= 2022 Odisha municipal elections =

Election of urban local bodies in Odisha in 2022

The 5th General Elections to Urban Local Bodies (ULBs) were held on 24 March 2022 and the date of counting was on 26 March 2022. Out of 115 ULBs in the State, elections were held for 111 ULBs (47 Municipalities, 61 Notified Area Councils (NACs) and 3 Municipal Corporations) in the State. Voter turnout was 61.26%. In this election, Mayors & Chairpersons were directly elected and None of the Above (NOTA) was introduced for the first time. They were held in concurrently with 2022 Odisha panchayat Elections. In this elections, Biju Janata Dal emerged victorious in all mayoral elections and 74 council chairpersons elections.

== Overview ==
Election were held for 3 Municipal Corporations, 47 Municipalities & 61 Notified Area Councils (NACs).

Due to pending court cases, Elections were not held in

1. 2 Municipal Corporations i.e. Rourkela Municipal Corporation & Sambalpur Municipal Corporation.
2. 1 Municipality i.e. Puri Municipality.
3. 1 NAC i.e. Odagaon NAC.

=== Delimitation & Reservation of seats ===
Reservation of Seats for 2022 Elections
| ULBs | | Unreserved | Reserved for Women | SC | SC Women | ST | ST Women | Total |
| Municipal Corporations | Mayor | 1 | 2 | - | - | - | - | 3 |
| Municipal Corporations | Corporators | 74 | 72 | 8 | 9 | 1 | 4 | 168 |
| Municipalities+NAC | Chairpersons | 42 | 39 | 8 | 9 | 3 | 5 | 106 |
| Municipalities+NAC | Councillors | 660 | 599 | 121 | 170 | 49 | 132 | 1731 |
| Total | | 777 | 712 | 137 | 188 | 53 | 141 | 2008 |

== Schedule ==
| Poll Event | Date |
|---|---|
| Notification Date | 28 February 2022 |
| Issue of nomination forms | 2 March 2022 |
| Last Date for filing nomination | 7 March 2022 |
| Scrutiny of nomination | 9 March 2022 |
| Last Date for Withdrawal of nomination | 14 March 2022 |
| Date of Poll | 24 March 2022 |
| Date of Counting of Votes | 26 March 2022 |
| Election of Vice Chairperson | 7 April 2022 |

== Municipal Corporation Election Result ==
=== Mayor result ===
| No. | Corporation Name | Winning candidate | Party | Losing Candidate | Party | Margin |
|---|---|---|---|---|---|---|
| 1 | Bhubaneswar Municipal Corporation | Sulochana Das | BJD | Suniti Mund | BJP | 61143 |
| 2 | Cuttack Municipal Corporation | Subash Chandra Singh | BJD | Giribala Behera | INC | 45206 |
| 3 | Berhampur Municipal Corporation | Sanghamitra Dalei | BJD | Sabita Suar | BJP | 20286 |

=== Corporators result ===
| No. | Corporation Name | No. of Wards | Corporators | | | |
| No. | Corporation Name | No. of Wards | BJD | BJP | INC | IND |
|---|---|---|---|---|---|---|
| 1 | BMC | 67 | 48 | 10 | 0 | 9 |
| 2 | CMC | 59 | 38 | 7 | 8 | 6 |
| 3 | BeMC | 42 | 30 | 7 | 1 | 4 |
| | Total | 168 | 116 | 24 | 9 | 19 |

== Municipalities Election Result ==
| No. | District | Municipality | Elected Chairperson | Party | No. of Wards | Councillors | | | |
| No. | District | Municipality | Elected Chairperson | Party | No. of Wards | BJD | BJP | INC | IND |
|---|---|---|---|---|---|---|---|---|---|
| 1 | Angul | Angul | Akshya Kumar Samanta | BJD | 23 | 10 | 13 | 0 | 0 |
| 2 | Angul | Talcher | Pabitra Bhutia | BJD | 21 | 18 | 3 | 0 | 0 |
| 3 | Balasore | Balasore | Sabita Sahoo | BJD | 31 | 17 | 9 | 0 | 5 |
| 4 | Balasore | Jaleswar | Pratip Kumar Pradhan | BJD | 17 | 12 | 4 | 1 | 0 |
| 5 | Balasore | Soro | Madhab Dhada | BJP | 19 | 4 | 12 | 3 | 0 |
| 6 | Bargarh | Bargarh | Kalpana Majhi | BJD | 19 | 18 | 1 | 0 | 0 |
| 7 | Bhadrak | Basudevpur | Nibedita Behera | BJD | 23 | 10 | 4 | 9 | 0 |
| 8 | Bhadrak | Bhadrak | Gulmaki Dalwazi | Independent | 30 | 17 | 1 | 6 | 5 |
| 9 | Balangir | Balangir | Lika Sahu | BJD | 21 | 16 | 1 | 4 | 0 |
| 10 | Balangir | Titlagarh | Mamata Debi Jain | BJP | 15 | 10 | 5 | 0 | 0 |
| 11 | Cuttack | Choudwar | Manasi Swarnaprava Samal | BJD | 19 | 13 | 1 | 1 | 4 |
| 12 | Deogarh | Deogarh | Santimanjari Dei | BJD | 11 | 4 | 6 | 0 | 1 |
| 13 | Dhenkanal | Dhenkanal | Jayanti Patra | BJP | 23 | 13 | 9 | 0 | 1 |
| 14 | Gajapati | Paralakhemundi | Nirmala Sethi | BJD | 16 | 14 | 2 | 0 | 0 |
| 15 | Ganjam | Hinjilicut | Subash Chandra Polai | BJD | 21 | 15 | 1 | 1 | 4 |
| 16 | Jagatsinghpur | Jagatsinghpur | Archana Singh | INC | 21 | 9 | 2 | 7 | 3 |
| 17 | Jagatsinghpur | Paradeep | Basanta Biswal | BJD | 19 | 7 | 3 | 1 | 8 |
| 18 | Jajpur | Jajpur | Ranjulata Hota | BJD | 18 | 18 | 0 | 0 | 0 |
| 19 | Jajpur | Vyasanagar | Sangita Pingua | BJD | 26 | 15 | 3 | 5 | 3 |
| 20 | Jharsuguda | Belpahar | Nimai Charan Panda | INC | 19 | 14 | 3 | 2 | 0 |
| 21 | Jharsuguda | Brajarajnagar | Jagayseni Oram | BJD | 23 | 20 | 2 | 0 | 1 |
| 22 | Jharsuguda | Jharsuguda | Rani Hati | BJD | 24 | 21 | 3 | 0 | 0 |
| 23 | Kalahandi | Bhawanipatna | Sanjukta Behera | BJD | 20 | 18 | 1 | 1 | 0 |
| 24 | Kandhamal | Phulbani | Smitarani Mohanty | BJP | 13 | 7 | 4 | 0 | 2 |
| 25 | Kendrapara | Kendrapara | Sarita Sahoo | BJD | 21 | 11 | 1 | 5 | 4 |
| 26 | Kendrapara | Pattamundai | Hemant Kumar Sahoo | BJD | 20 | 14 | 3 | 2 | 0 |
| 27 | Keonjhar | Anandapur | Rajanirani Khatua | BJD | 16 | 12 | 4 | 0 | 0 |
| 28 | Keonjhar | Barbil | Laxman Mahanta | BJD | 15 | 12 | 3 | 0 | 0 |
| 29 | Keonjhar | Joda | Jagadish Prasad Sahoo | BJD | 14 | 7 | 4 | 0 | 3 |
| 30 | Keonjhar | Keonjhar | Niku Sahoo | BJP | 21 | 13 | 8 | 0 | 0 |
| 31 | Khordha | Jatani | Ananta Behera | BJD | 23 | 12 | 1 | 5 | 5 |
| 32 | Khordha | Khordha | Kanaka Laxmi Mohanty | BJD | 22 | 13 | 4 | 0 | 5 |
| 33 | Koraput | Jeypur | Narendra Kumar Mohanty | INC | 28 | 15 | 0 | 12 | 1 |
| 34 | Koraput | Koraput | Lalat Ranjan Sethi | BJD | 21 | 15 | 0 | 3 | 3 |
| 35 | Koraput | Sunabeda | Rajendra Kumar Patra | Independent | 25 | 19 | 2 | 3 | 1 |
| 36 | Malkangiri | Malkangiri | Manoj Barik | BJD | 19 | 14 | 0 | 5 | 0 |
| 37 | Mayurbhanj | Baripada | Krushna Nanda Mohanty | BJD | 28 | 22 | 3 | 0 | 3 |
| 38 | Mayurbhanj | Rairangpur | Abhishek Pattnaik | BJD | 15 | 11 | 4 | 0 | 0 |
| 39 | Nabarangpur | Nawarangpur | Kunu Nayak | BJP | 17 | 9 | 6 | 0 | 0 |
| 40 | Nabarangpur | Umerkot | Radha Bhatra | BJD | 14 | 11 | 1 | 2 | 0 |
| 41 | Nayagarh | Nayagarh | Nirupama Khatei | BJD | 16 | 16 | 0 | 0 | 0 |
| 42 | Rayagada | Gunupur | Mamata Gouda | Independent | 19 | 8 | 0 | 0 | 11 |
| 43 | Rayagada | Rayagada | Patnaikuni Mahesh Patnaik | BJD | 24 | 21 | 2 | 1 | 0 |
| 44 | Subarnapur | Sonepur | Tamasi Tamasmita Nayak | BJD | 15 | 12 | 2 | 1 | 0 |
| 45 | Sundergarh | Biramitrapur | Sandeep Mishra | BJD | 11 | 9 | 1 | 1 | 0 |
| 46 | Sundergarh | Rajgangpur | Madhuri Lugun | BJD | 20 | 12 | 3 | 4 | 1 |
| 47 | Sundergarh | Sundergarh | Tanaya Mishra | BJP | 19 | 11 | 7 | 0 | 1 |
| Total | | | | | 619 | 152 | 85 | 75 | |

=== Chairpersons Result ===
| Municipalities | Total | BJD | BJP | INC | IND |
|---|---|---|---|---|---|
| Chairpersons | 47 | 34 | 7 | 3 | 3 |

== Notified Area Councils (NACs) Election Result ==
| No. | District | NAC | Elected Chairperson | Party | No. of Wards | Councillors | | | |
| No. | District | NAC | Elected Chairperson | Party | No. of Wards | BJD | BJP | INC | IND |
|---|---|---|---|---|---|---|---|---|---|
| 1 | Angul | Athmallik | Asha Kumari Sahoo | BJD | 11 | 9 | 1 | 0 | 1 |
| 2 | Balasore | Nilagiri | Ambika Das | BJD | 13 | 8 | 3 | 1 | 1 |
| 3 | Balasore | Remuna | Tanuja Giri | BJD | 13 | 10 | 3 | 0 | 0 |
| 4 | Bargarh | Attabira | Banamali Bariha | BJD | 12 | 11 | 0 | 1 | 0 |
| 5 | Bargarh | Barapali | Dinesh Gahir | Independent | 11 | 10 | 0 | 1 | 0 |
| 6 | Bargarh | Bijepur | Sita Barik | BJD | 11 | 7 | 3 | 0 | 1 |
| 7 | Bargarh | Padmapur | Sabitri Bag | BJD | 11 | 7 | 4 | 0 | 0 |
| 8 | Bhadrak | Chandabali | Santi Sethi | BJD | 15 | 11 | 3 | 1 | 0 |
| 9 | Bhadrak | Dhamanagar | Nibedita Jena | BJD | 11 | 9 | 2 | 0 | 0 |
| 10 | Balangir | Kantabanji | Bariyam Singh Saluja | INC | 16 | 5 | 1 | 10 | 0 |
| 11 | Balangir | Patnagarh | Manasi Biswal | BJD | 15 | 14 | 0 | 0 | 1 |
| 12 | Balangir | Tusura | Ajaya Kumar Jaiswal | BJD | 11 | 7 | 4 | 0 | 0 |
| 13 | Boudh | Boudhgarh | Mrutyunjaya Mishra | BJD | 17 | 15 | 2 | 0 | 0 |
| 14 | Cuttack | Athagarh | Sasmita Rout | BJD | 18 | 16 | 0 | 1 | 1 |
| 15 | Cuttack | Banki | Manika Sahoo | BJD | 17 | 11 | 0 | 6 | 0 |
| 16 | Dhenkanal | Bhuban | Suvendu Kumar Sahoo | BJD | 15 | 8 | 7 | 0 | 0 |
| 17 | Dhenkanal | Hindol | Kesab Pradhan | BJD | 16 | 11 | 5 | 0 | 0 |
| 18 | Dhenkanal | Kamakhyanagar | Dharmananda Parida | BJD | 14 | 14 | 0 | 0 | 0 |
| 19 | Gajapati | Kashinagar | Mediboina Sudha Rani | BJD | 13 | 10 | 2 | 1 | 0 |
| 20 | Ganjam | Aska | Bineta Swain | BJD | 18 | 11 | 2 | 3 | 2 |
| 21 | Ganjam | Bellaguntha | Phyroj Kumar Sethi | BJD | 13 | 13 | 0 | 0 | 0 |
| 22 | Ganjam | Bhanjanagar | Gopabandhu Mahapatra | BJD | 15 | 15 | 0 | 0 | 0 |
| 23 | Ganjam | Buguda | Chitrasen Pradhan | BJD | 13 | 11 | 2 | 0 | 0 |
| 24 | Ganjam | Chhatrapur | Sarmistha Pradhan | BJP | 14 | 10 | 3 | 1 | 0 |
| 25 | Ganjam | Chikiti | Dipa Kumari Sahu | BJD | 12 | 12 | 0 | 0 | 0 |
| 26 | Ganjam | Digapahandi | Prafulla Panda | INC | 11 | 5 | 0 | 6 | 0 |
| 27 | Ganjam | Ganjam | Prativa Padhy | Independent | 12 | 10 | 1 | 0 | 1 |
| 28 | Ganjam | Gopalpur | A Janaki Ram | BJD | 11 | 8 | 3 | 0 | 0 |
| 29 | Ganjam | Kabisuryanagar | CH Laxmi Sethi | BJD | 18 | 17 | 1 | 0 | 0 |
| 30 | Ganjam | Khallikote | Niranjan Behera | BJD | 12 | 11 | 1 | 0 | 0 |
| 31 | Ganjam | Kodala | Surjya Narayan Nayak | BJP | 13 | 3 | 8 | 1 | 1 |
| 32 | Ganjam | Polasara | Sangeeta Behera | BJD | 19 | 13 | 6 | 0 | 0 |
| 33 | Ganjam | Purusottampur | Priyanka Gouda | Independent | 14 | 11 | 0 | 0 | 3 |
| 34 | Ganjam | Rambha | Manasi Swain | BJP | 13 | 11 | 2 | 0 | 0 |
| 35 | Ganjam | Surada | Siba Sankar Panda | BJD | 11 | 9 | 1 | 1 | 0 |
| 36 | Kalahandi | Dharamgarh | Ashok Kumar Mohanty | BJP | 14 | 9 | 5 | 0 | 0 |
| 37 | Kalahandi | Junagarh | Mukesh Agrawal | BJP | 12 | 10 | 2 | 0 | 0 |
| 38 | Kalahandi | Kesinga | Nruparaj Yadav | BJD | 12 | 10 | 1 | 1 | 0 |
| 39 | Kandhamal | Baliguda | Gobinda Chandra Pradhan | BJD | 13 | 11 | 0 | 2 | 0 |
| 40 | Kandhamal | G. Udayagiri | Bhanuprava Mishra | BJD | 13 | 7 | 4 | 1 | 1 |
| 41 | Keonjhar | Champua | Girija Sankar Sahoo | BJD | 13 | 13 | 0 | 0 | 0 |
| 42 | Khordha | Balugaon | Sukanti Paikaray | BJD | 11 | 6 | 5 | 0 | 0 |
| 43 | Khordha | Banapur | Mitu Nayak | BJD | 15 | 9 | 6 | 0 | 0 |
| 44 | Koraput | Kotpad | M. Shankar Rao | INC | 13 | 3 | 3 | 6 | 1 |
| 45 | Malkangiri | Balimela | Pradeep Kumar Nayak | BJP | 12 | 8 | 4 | 0 | 0 |
| 46 | Mayurbhanj | Karanjia | Popi Prusty | BJD | 15 | 12 | 3 | 0 | 0 |
| 47 | Mayurbhanj | Udala | Pramila Panda | BJP | 12 | 6 | 5 | 0 | 1 |
| 48 | Nayagarh | Dashapalla | Punam Priyadarshinee | Independent | 16 | 7 | 1 | 0 | 8 |
| 49 | Nayagarh | Khandapada | Arati Pradhan | Independent | 13 | 8 | 1 | 0 | 4 |
| 50 | Nayagarh | Ranapur | Rangeen Mahanti | BJD | 15 | 11 | 2 | 0 | 2 |
| 51 | Nuapada | Khariar | Ujjwal Gupta | INC | 13 | 5 | 2 | 6 | 0 |
| 52 | Nuapada | Khariar Road | Sonia Jain | BJP | 19 | 10 | 8 | 0 | 1 |
| 53 | Nuapada | Nuapada | Mahammad Adam | Independent | 14 | 8 | 1 | 1 | 4 |
| 54 | Puri | Konark | Sanjukta Tripathy | BJD | 13 | 7 | 2 | 3 | 1 |
| 55 | Puri | Nimapada | Sasmita Sahoo | BJD | 11 | 7 | 3 | 0 | 1 |
| 56 | Puri | Pipili | SK. Babu | BJD | 16 | 13 | 2 | 0 | 1 |
| 57 | Rayagada | Gudari | Sarimita Sabar | BJD | 11 | 11 | 0 | 0 | 0 |
| 58 | Sambalpur | Kuchinda | Pradyut Kumar Mohanty | BJD | 11 | 9 | 2 | 0 | 0 |
| 59 | Sambalpur | Redhakhol | Sibaram Sahoo | BJP | 13 | 6 | 6 | 1 | 0 |
| 60 | Subarnapur | Binka | Subash Chandra Bhue | BJD | 12 | 11 | 1 | 0 | 0 |
| 61 | Subarnapur | Tarbha | Bandita Nayak | BJD | 12 | 11 | 0 | 0 | 1 |
| Total | | | | | 823 | 591 | 139 | 55 | 38 |

=== Chairpersons result ===
| NACs | Total | BJD | BJP | INC | IND |
|---|---|---|---|---|---|
| Chairpersons | 61 | 42 | 9 | 4 | 6 |
