= Dihapadhal, Ganjam =

Dihapadhala Padhala
- village
- Location in Odisha, India Dihapadhala (India)
- Coordinates: 19°56′19″N 84°36′12″E
- Country: India
- State: Odisha
- District: Ganjam

Government
  - Type: Panchayat
  - Lok Sabha constituency: Phulbani parliamentary constituency
  - Odisha Vidhan Sabha constituency: Bhanjanagar assembly constituency
- Elevation: 13 m (43 ft)

Languages
  - Official: Odia
- Time zone: UTC+5:30 (IST)
- PIN: 761140
- Telephone code: 06821
- Vehicle registration: OD
- Website: odisha.gov.in

Dihapadhal is a Village located near Bhanjanagar of Ganjam district in Orissa. It is located 104 km north off the District Headquarters Chhatrapur and 170 km from State capital Bhubaneswar. Bhanjanagar, Lalsingi, Jilundi, Baunsalundi, Inginathi and Sanakodanda are the nearby Villages to Dihapadhal. Odia is the commonly spoken local language here.

== Geography ==
Dihapadhal is surrounded by Bellaguntha Tehsil towards South, Jagannathprasad Tehsil towards East, Buguda Tehsil towards East, Surada Tehsil towards South. Dihapadhal is a large village located in Bhanjanagar of Ganjam district, Orissa with total 492 families residing. The village code of Dihapadhal is 3082300

== Demography ==
The Dihapadhal village has population of 2453 of which 1211 are males while 1242 are females as per Population Census 2011. In Dihapadhal village population of children with age 0-6 is 285 which makes up 11.62% of total population of village. Average Sex Ratio of Dihapadhal village is 1026 which is higher than Orissa state average of 979. Child Sex Ratio for the Dihapadhal as per census is 815, lower than Orissa average of 941. Dihapadhal village has higher literacy rate compared to Orissa. In 2011, literacy rate of Dihapadhal village was 77.68% compared to 72.87% of Orissa. In Dihapadhal Male literacy stands at 84.72% while female literacy rate was 71.01%.As per constitution of India and Panchyati Raaj Act, Dihapadhal village is administrated by Sarpanch (Head of Village) who is elected representative of village.

== Transportation ==
There is no railway station near to Dihapadhal in less than 10 km. It is 82 km far from Berhampur Railway Station and It is 170 km far from State Capital Bhubaneswar Biju Patnaik International Airport.

== Education institutions in Dihapadhala ==
=== Schools ===
- G.P High School
- Saraswati Shishu Vidya Mandir
- Dihapadhala Upper Primary School
- Tulasipall Upper Primary School

== Festivals in Dihapadhala ==
Danda Nata or Danda Jatra (Odia: ଦଣ୍ଡ ନାଟ, ଦଣ୍ଡ ଯାତ୍ରା)is one of the most important traditional dance festivals organized in different parts of South Odisha and particularly in the Ganjam District, the heartland of ancient Kalinga Empire. The Danda Nata festival is being held in the month of Chaitra of every year for the devotion to Goddesses Kali and Lord Shiva.
