= Bijayadhanurjayapur =

Bijayadhanurjayapur ବିଜୟଧନୁର୍ଜୟପୁର B.D.Pur
- Village
- Location in Orissa, India
- Coordinates: 19.95°N 84.60°E
- Country: India
- State: Odisha
- District: Ganjam

Languages
  - Official: Odia
- Time zone: UTC+5:30 (IST)
- PIN: 761120
- Telephone code: 06823
- Vehicle registration: OR-07/OD-07, OD-32
- Panchayat Samiti (Block): Jagannath Prasad
- Legislative Assembly Constituency: Bhanjanagar
- Lok Sabha Constituency: Kandhamal
- Avg. summer temperature: 41 °C (106 °F)
- Avg. winter temperature: 22 °C (72 °F)

Bijayadhanurjayapur (B.D.Pur) previously known as Tentulia Sasan is a village near Bellaguntha of Ganjam district in Odisha, India. It is named after King Dhananjay Bhanja of Bhanja dynasty.

== History ==
King Dhananjaya Bhanja (forefather of Kabi Samrat Upendra Bhanja) donated a small piece of land to a group of Brahmin so they could assist him in worshiping the deities of the kingdom, as well as to look after the medical needs of the community.

== Geography and institutions ==
Bijayadhanurjayapur is a semi-urban village located 7 kilometres (4.3 mi) from the nearest town Bellaguntha. It is located 108 km towards north from District Headquarters Chhatrapur & 149 km from State capital Bhubaneswar through State Highway 21. The people from roughly 15 to 20 nearby villages depend on this road for communication and market access. The nearest railway station is 80 kilometres (50 mi) away at Berhampur. The nearest airport is at Bhubaneswar, which is 160 kilometres (99 mi) away.

The village has a degree college (Tentulia Sasan Devasthan College) established in 1981. It has a girls high school, a co-educational high school, a M. E. school and a U.P. school.

The following temples are located in this village:

- Shri Shri Gopinath Swami Temple (where Lord Krishna and Lord Shiva (ChandraShekhar) dwell)
- Shri Shri Balunkeswar Temple
- Maa Gramadevati Temple
- Maa Ugratara Temple
- Maa Bata Mangala Temple (near Tentulia Sasana Devasthan College)

There is a Punjab National Bank, B.D.Pur Branch

An ancient folk drama group (Prahlada Nataka) is also based in the village.
