= Mujagada, Ganjam =

Mujagada
- village
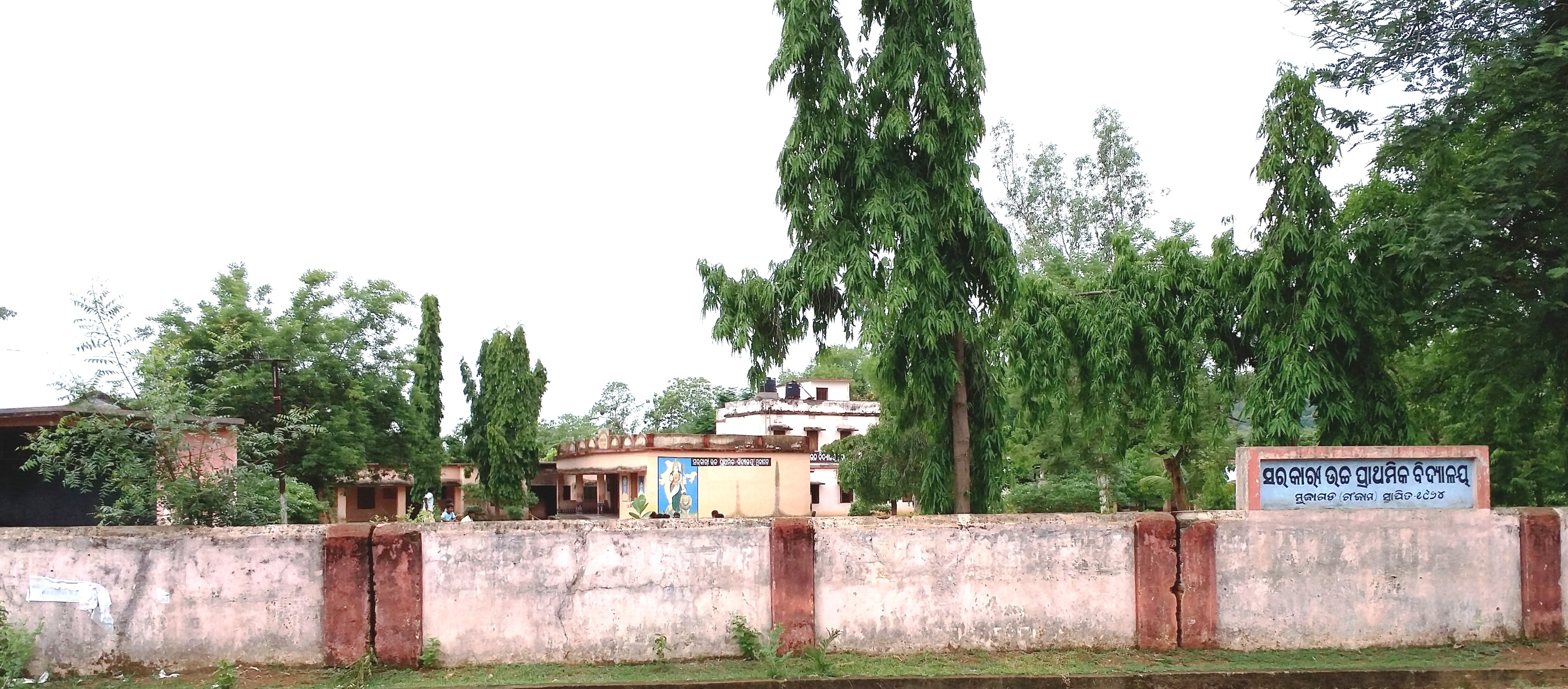
- Mujagada U.P. School

- Location in Odisha, India
- Coordinates: 19°03′36″N 84°34′48″E
- Country: India
- State: Odisha
- District: Ganjam

Government
  - Type: Democratic

Languages
  - Official: Oriya
- Time zone: UTC+5:30 (IST)
- PIN: 761132

Mujagada is a large village located near Bhanjanagar of Ganjam district in Orissa. It is located 89 kilometres (55 mi) north of the district headquarters, Chhatrapur, and 159 kilometres (99 mi) from the state capital Bhubaneswar. Asika, Hinjilicut, Phulabani, and Berhampur are nearby. Oriya is the local language here. The main occupation of this village is agriculture.

== Geography ==
Bhanjanagar, Asika, Badagada, Brahmapur are the towns nearest to Mujagada village. It is surrounded by Belaguntha Tehsil towards East and Surada Tehsil towards South.

== Demography ==
As per Census 2011, the village code of Mujagada is 410550. Out of the total population, 2057 were engaged in work activities. 29.07% of workers describe their work as main work (Employment or Earning more than 6 Months) while 70.93% were involved in Marginal activity providing livelihood for less than 6 months. Of 2057 workers engaged in Main Work, 120 were cultivators (owner or co-owner) while 33 were Agricultural labourer. In Mujagada village population of children with age group 0-6 is 510, which makes up 11.48% of total population of village. Average Sex Ratio of Mujagada is 978 which is lower than Orissa state average of 979. Child Sex Ratio for Mujagada as per census-2011 is 828, lower than Orissa average of 941. Mujagada village has lower literacy rate compared to Orissa. In 2011, literacy rate of Mujagada village was 70.96% compared to 72.87% of Orissa. In Mujagada Male literacy stands at 81.55% while female literacy rate was 60.38%. Schedule Caste (SC) constitutes 25.21% while Schedule Tribe (ST) were 14.13% of the total population in Mujagada village.

== Transportation ==
There is no railway station at Mujagada. Brahmapur is the nearest railway station located at 179 km from State Capital Bhubaneswar.But it is well connected to all the major cities of the state.it is the only to route to Phulbani which is the district headquarter of Kandhamal district.
