= Chadiapada =

- Village
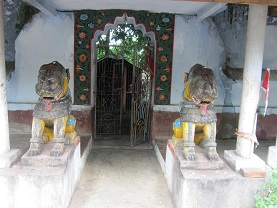
- ଠାକୁରାଣୀ ମନ୍ଦିର

- Location within Odisha
- Coordinates: 19.6816266°N 84.7952056°E
- Country: India
- State: Odisha
- District: Ganjam
- Block: Polasara
- Gram Panchayat: Khanduru

Population (2011)
  - Total: 1,001

Language
  - Official: Oriya
- Time zone: IST
- PIN: 761105

Chadiapada is a small village in Ganjam district of Odisha, India.

== Geography ==
Chadiapada is located at 19.6816266°N 84.7952056°E. It has an average elevation of 61 meters (200 feet). It is situated at 67 km from Brahmapur on North, 3 km from Polasara on the South-West. Polasara - Asika road passes through this village.

== Demographics ==
- As of 2011 India census, Chadiapada had 243 households with a population of 1,001. Males constitute 48.05% (481) of the population and females 51.95% (520). Chadiapada had an average literacy rate of 62%, lower than the national average of 64.8%: male literacy is 70.47%, and female literacy is 54.2%. In Chadiapada, 14% of the population is under 6 years of age.
- As of 2001 India census, Chadiapada had a population of 994 in 213 households with 49% (484) males and 51% (510) females.

== Temples ==
- Nilakantheshwara Mandira
- Kanaka Durga Mandira or Panchu Deula
- Gundicha Mandira
- Gramadevi Mandira
- Thakurani Mandira

== Education ==
Chadiapada has two Upper Primary Schools and one Middle English School.

- Chadiapada Krushnadaspur Sasan Upper Primary School
- Deulapalli Upper Primary School
- Kanaka Durga Middle English School

== Economy ==
Most people of this village are farmers and textile mill workers in Surat. A few are government and private sector employees. Most of the Brahmins of this village perform priestly services.

== Transport ==
The nearest town is Polasara (around 155 km from state capital Bhubaneswar). It is well connected by road with various cities and towns like Bhubaneswar, Asika, Berhampur and Buguda. Frequent bus services are available to all the above cities.
