= Kukudakhandi =

- Block
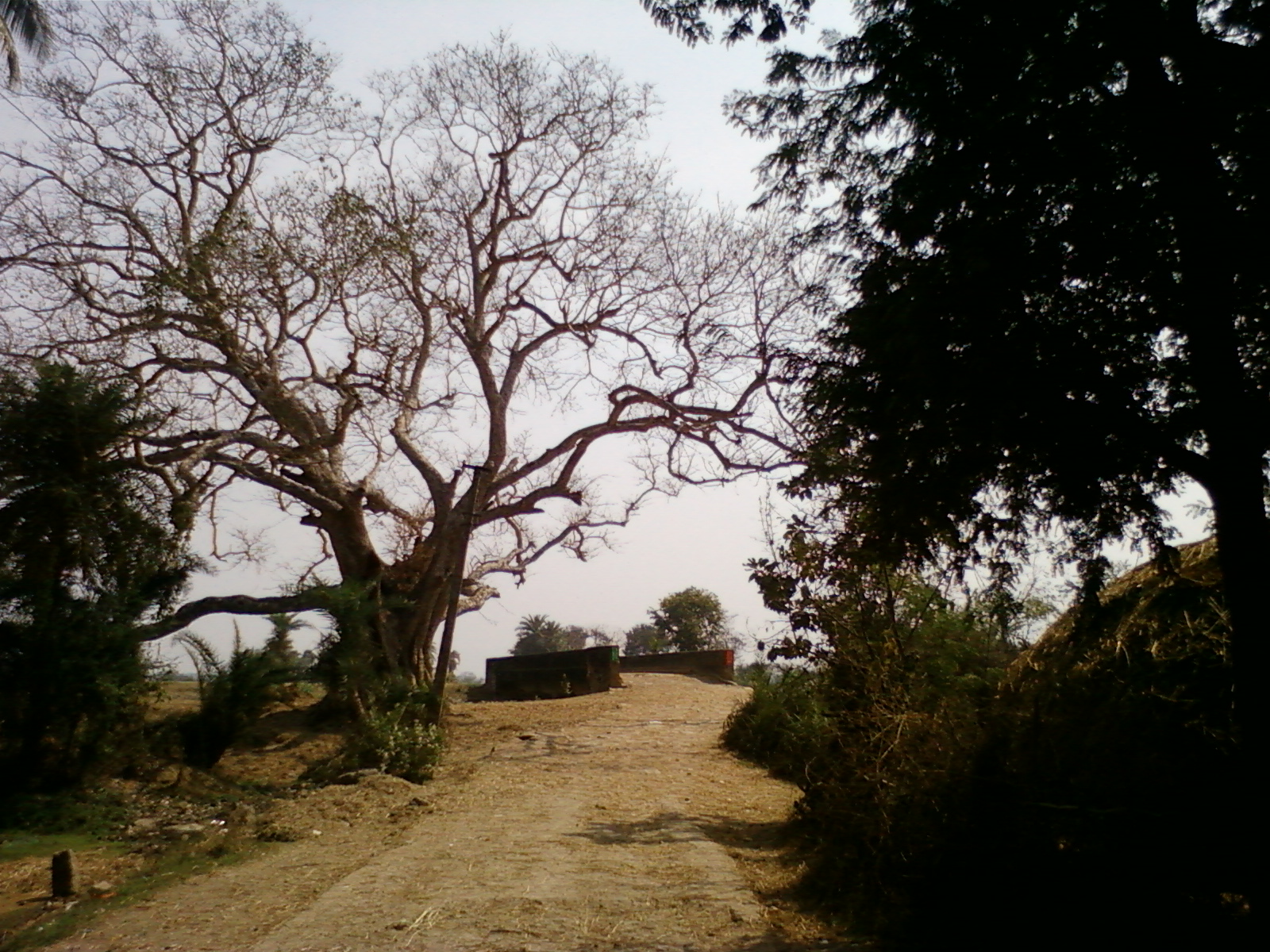

- Location within Odisha Location within India
- Coordinates: 19.3926°N 84.7521°E
- Country: India
- State: Odisha
- District: Ganjam

Population (2011)
  - Total: 7,361

Languages
  - Official: Odia
- Time zone: UTC+5:30 (IST)
- PIN: 761100
- Telephone code: 0680
- Vehicle registration: OR-07; OD-07

Kukudakhandi popularly known as KKD is one of the significant villages in the Kukudakhandi Tehsil of Ganjam district in the Indian State of Odisha. The village is 31.2 km from its district main sub-division Chatrapur and is 149 km from its State capital Bhubaneswar. KKD is more often considered a part of the city of Berhampur

Villages near KKD include Ramachandrapur (Baunsiapalli 1.2 km), Masiakhali (3.2 km), Dayapalli (3.7 km), Saradhapur (4 km), Badakhandi (4.3 km), and Dakhinapur (5.6 km). Nearest Towns are Kukudakhandi (0 km), Hinjilicut (10.2 km), Sanakhemundi (12.7 km), Rangeilunda (16.6 km).

== Economy ==
As Kukudakhandi is well connected to nearby Berhampur, many people rush to the city to make a living, as the city offers many opportunities. Most of the people in KKD are government employees, and some are involved in agricultural activities. Agriculture is the mainstay of the economy. The farmers no longer limit their agricultural activities but strive to make a profit from their labor.

=== Industry ===
The emergence of industrial kukudakhandi began in the late twentieth century, with granite industries arriving. Kukudakhandi's proximity to Berhampur, good climate, and availability of talent made it a destination for good firms.

== Culture ==
Kukudakhandi is a predominantly Hindu region. A great exchange of wishes on occasions like Ganesh Puja. Diwali, Dussehra, Makar Sankranti, & Christmas are very special to see in the village. About 99% people are Hindus. So regional festivals like Jhami yatra, Danda Yatra & Meru, Rath Yatra (Sri Jagannath Yatra) are very special to see.

=== Temples & Festivals ===
Kukudakhandi is a hub of temples. Several temples are present in the village of which Mukteswar Temple is very prominent. The brightening of those temples often occurs in the festivals like Ganesh Puja, Maha Shivratri, Diwali and the decorated stalls during Dussehra.

==== Thakurani Yatra ====
The 10-day-long festival of kukudakhandi Thakurani, popularly known as 'Thakurani Yatra' comes once every five year. Initially, the famous Thakurani yatra was started in Berhampur. According to some eminent historians, the cult of Buddhi Thakurani originated along with the emergence of Berhampur town in and around 1672 AD. The Telugu Lengayat Dera (weaver) community, who came to Mahuri on the invitation of Raja Saheb of Mahuri to take up their profession of weaving, started their ‘Ghata Yatra’ (Pot Festival) to highlight the divinity of Mahamayee Thakurani of his capital town Berhampur. The Chief of the Dera community, Kota Chandramani Kubera Senapati, led his community people to migrate to Mahuri and Berhampur who settled down into their hereditary profession of weaving tussar silken products or ‘patta matha’. The ‘Ghata Yatra’ was initiated for the purpose of highlighting the tradition of worshiping Thakurani. This is later considered as Thakurani Yatra. Now, this festival is not only celebrated in Berhampur but also in different parts across the district of Ganjam. Apart from Berhampur, people of Kukudakhandi, Boirani(Kabisurya Nagar), BhanjaNagar, Asika, and Chhatrapur also celebrate this festival as Thakurani Yatra.

== Visitor attractions ==
Some of the prominent places to visit near the village are;

1. Gopalpur-on-sea
2. Silk city Berhampur
3. Tara Tarini Temple
4. Mahuri Kalua
5. IRE Port
6. Sonapur beach
7. Siddha Vairabi Temple

== Education ==
Education is very prominent in Kukudakhandi. Increasing numbers of colleges, coaching centres & other educational institutions have extended the quality of education and this may possibly be the reason why more individuals are working with MNCs in big cities as well as in foreign countries.

=== Schools in Kukudakhandi ===
1. Odisha Adarsha Vidyalaya
2. Girls Upper Primary(U.P) School
3. Main Road U.P School
4. Rathachakada Sahi U.P school
5. Block School
6. Indira Awas U.P School.
7. M.E School
8. Residential School
9. Saraswati Sisu Mandir
10. Govt High School
11. Biju Patnaik Girls High School

Other prominent Schools nearby kukudakhandi

1. Maa Aravind School
2. Takshashila Residential School

=== Colleges in Kukudakhandi & nearby ===
1. Science College Kukudakhandi
2. Sanjay Memorial Institute of Technology (SMIT)
3. Govt. Ayurvedic College, Ankushpur

== Offices in Kukudakhandi ==
1. Tahsil Office
2. RI Office
3. Treasury
4. BSNL Telephone Exchange
5. Kukudakhandi Sub-Post office
6. Govt Medical, Kukudakhandi
7. Veterinary Dispensary
