= Jilundi, Ganjam =

Jilundi Jilundi
- village
- Location in Odisha, India Jilundi (India)
- Coordinates: 19°54′51″N 84°33′54″E
- Country: India
- State: Odisha
- District: Ganjam

Government
  - Type: Democratic

Languages
  - Official: Oriya
- Time zone: UTC+5:30 (IST)
- PIN: 761133
- Vehicle registration: OD
- Website: odisha.gov.in

Jilundi is a small village located near Bhanjanagar of Ganjam district in Orissa. It is located 88 km towards north from District Headquarters Chhatrapur and 161 km from the state capital Bhubaneswar. Bhanjanagar, Dihapadhal, Lalsingi, Inginathi, Sanakodanda are the nearby villages to Jilundi. Oriya is the local language here.
