= Pattapur =

- Village
- Location in Ganjam, Odisha, India Pattapur (India)
- Coordinates: 19.4474242°N 84.5923005°E
- Country: India
- State: Odisha
- District: Ganjam

Languages
  - Official: Odia
- Time zone: UTC+5:30 (IST)
- PIN: 761013
- Telephone code: 06814
- Vehicle registration: OR-07; OD-07

Pattapur is a village in the Ganjam district of Odisha state, India. Belongs Sanakhemundi Block.

Bhubaneswar, the state capital, is located around 190 km from Pattapur. The nearest railway station, Brahmapur, is around 32 km away.

Pattapur's nearest town/city/important place is Digapahandi located at the distance of 9.3 km. Surrounding town/city/TP/CT from Pattapur are as follows.

Digapahandi	9.3 km
Hinjilicut	23 km
Asika	27 km
Brahmapur	32 km
Chikiti	34 km

Pattapur has a Govt. Hospital, Block, Govt. High School, Govt. College.
