= Balakumari =

Maa Balakumari Balakumari
- Tourist Place
- Balakumari
- Location of Balakumari in Odisha Maa Balakumari (India)
- Coordinates: 19.200402°N 84.639364°E
- Country: India
- State: Odisha
- District: Ganjam
- Time zone: UTC+05:30 (IST)
- Official language: Odia
- Spoken languages: Odia

Balakumari or Maa Balakumari is a temple and tourist place destination in Odisha. The place is well known as a holy pilgrim destination for a temple where Maa Balakumari is worshiped on the top of the mountain near chikiti.

== History ==
Temple of Maa Balakumari was founded by the royal family of Chikiti. Maa Balakumari is the famous goddess of the locality. The temple is situated in the east of the town Chikiti.

The place is provided with all necessary features. Tourists have to climb 1240 steps to reach at the top of the temple. The temple reigned by Goddess Durga is frequented by people of many parts of Southern Odisha (Chikiti)and near areas of Andhra Pradesh. The place is at a distance of 52 km from the district headquarters and at a distance of 208 km from state capital. One of the important festivals celebrated at the temple is Sankranti day of each month and all Tuesdays.
