= Karatali =

- City
- Location in Odisha, India Karatali (India)
- Coordinates: 19.35°N 84.98°E
- Country: India
- State: Odisha
- District: Ganjam
- Elevation: 14 m (46 ft)

Population (2011)
  - Total: 664

Languages
  - Official: Oriya
- Time zone: UTC+5:30 (IST)
- PIN: 761111
- Telephone code: 06818
- Vehicle registration: OR-09; OD-09
- Website: odisha.gov.in

Karatali is a village of Chatrapur tahasil in Ganjam district in the Indian state of Odisha.

== Demographics ==
With a total of 127 families residing, Karatali village has a population of 664, of which 344 are males and 320 are females as per Population Census 2011. In 2011, the literacy rate of Karatali village was 81.93% compared to 72.87% of Odisha. The village's male literacy rate was 97.30% while the literacy rate for females was 65.96%. The average sex ratio of the village is 930.

== Education ==
The village has the following schools/educational institutions.

- Haladiapadar U.P.S School
