= National Highway 326 (India) =

National highway in India

National Highway 326
- Map of National Highway 326 in red

Route information
- Length: 529 km (329 mi)

Major junctions
- North end: Asika, Odisha
- South end: Chinturu road, Andhra Pradesh

Location
- Country: India
- States: Odisha, Andhra Pradesh
- Primary destinations: Asika, Digapahandi, Rayagada, Koraput, Jeypore Malkangiri and Chinturu

Highway system
- Roads in India; Expressways; National; State; Asian

National Highway 326 (NH 326) is a 529 km (329 mi) long National Highway in the Indian states of Andhra Pradesh and Odisha. It was formed as a new highway by up-gradation of former state highways of the states. It starts at Asika of Odisha and ends at Chinturu road of Andhra Pradesh.

== Route ==
It starts at NH59 at Asika and passes by the Historic Amagan Pokhari Lake, then connects Sheragada, Pattapur,Digapahandi, Punjikanyan square, Taptapani Ghats, Taptapani, Kandhapani, Ramaguda, Tentulipadar Ghats, Jaykaypur, Rayagada, Guma Ghats, Laxmipur (Odisha Vidhan Sabha constituency), Kakiriguma, Koraput, Jeypore Ghats, Jeypore, Malkangiri, Kalimela, Motu in Odisha and ends at Chinturu Road in Andhra Pradesh at NH30.

State-wise route length are:

- Odisha - 513.50 km (319.07 mi)
- Andhra Pradesh - 15.50 km (9.63 mi)

== See also ==
- List of national highways in Andhra Pradesh
- List of national highways in Odisha
