= Kandhei Jatra =

Traditional Indian festival

Kandhei Jatra or Toy Fair is a traditional festival celebrated every year in Berhampur in the Indian state of Odisha. The festival is three centuries old and related to the oldest Jagannath temple of the city. This festival takes place for three days and things for domestic use made of clay, wood or metal were also put up for sale.

== Plot ==
This festival is celebrated every year on the full moon day of Hindu calendar month of Ashadha. This festival is held at Berhampur known as the silk city after a week of Ratha Yatra. It is to be believed that the traditional festival is around three centuries older. The toy fair is ritualistically attached to the oldest Jagannath temple in the city (Berhampur) located in Khaspa Street. According to the tradition, on the night the pedestal of idol of lord Jagannath at this temple is decorated with earthen toys of different mythological characters. The good thing about the festival is that, it promotes the traditional toy makers of the area who make toys from clay, cow dung, wood, coir and papier-mâché.

== History ==
According to the local tales, centuries back, a priest of the Bada Jagannath Temple Sribachha Panda (ଶ୍ରୀବଛ ପଣ୍ଡା) requested the king of Mahuri Kingdom (now known as Mahuri Kalua by the locals) for the festival and he permitted it. Since then the festival has been celebrated every year at Khaspa Street of Berhampur.
