= Madhaba Nanda Behera =

Indian politician (1942–2016)

Member of Odisha Legislative Assembly
- In office 2004–2009
- Preceded by: Simanchala Behera
- Constituency: Jagannath Prasad

Personal details
- Born: Madhaba Nanda Behera; 1 July 1942
- Died: 27 June 2016 (aged 73) Bhubaneswar
- Party: Biju Janata Dal
- Other political affiliations: Janata Dal
- Spouse: Smt. Lakhmi Behera
- Children: 3 Daughters and 4 Sons
- Occupation: Agriculture

Madhaba Nanda Behera (1 July 1942 – 27 June 2016) was a defence personnel and socio-political leader from the state of Odisha in India. From Jagannath Prasad constituency, he was elected 3 times to the Odisha Legislative Assembly during the 10th (1990), 11th (1995), and 13th (2004) assembly elections. While in defence, he had participated in the wars with Pakistan in 1965 and with Bangladesh in 1971.
