= Makundapur =

- Town
- Location in Odisha, India Makundapur (India)
- Coordinates: 19.6346°N 84.7048°E
- Country: India
- State: Odisha
- District: Ganjam

Population (2001)
  - Total: 4,974

Languages
  - Official: Oriya
- Time zone: UTC+5:30 (IST)
- PIN: 761111
- Telephone code: 06822
- Vehicle registration: OR-07; OD-07
- Website: odisha.gov.in

Makundapur is a census town in Ganjam district in the Indian state of Odisha.

== Demographics ==
As of 2001 India census, Makundapur had a population of 4974. Males constitute 51% of the population and females 49%. Makundapur has an average literacy rate of 71%, higher than the national average of 59.5%: male literacy is 81%, and female literacy is 60%. In Makundapur, 12% of the population is under 6 years of age.
