= Palakasandha =

Coordinates: 19.781474°N 84.583570°E

Palakasandha is a village in Khetriyabarapur panchayat of Belaguntha Block in Ganjam district, Odisha, India.

The population is approximately 1,000, with most of them dependent on agriculture. Antaryami Behara is the Sarpanch of the village. Nilakanthaswar is a noted temple of this village.

Community Halls:

There are two community halls in the village: "Mali Sahi Akeda Ghar" and "Bada Sahi Akheda Ghar."

The Raja Nata (The King's Opera)

Palakadandha is famous for its Raja Nata performed by village residents. Sometimes, they perform it at other villages.
