= Govindapally =

Govindapally Govindapali ଗୋବିନ୍ଦପାଲ୍ଲୀ
- Located in Odisha
- Coordinates: 18.581°N 82.289°E
- Country: India
- State: Odisha
- District: Malkangiri district

Population (2011)
  - Total: 3,659

Languages
  - Official: Odia
- Time zone: UTC+5:30 (Indian Standard Time)

Govindapally, alternatively spelled "Govindapali", is a small town and panchayat in Malkangiri district of Odisha state in India. It comes under the Khairput block. It is at the entrance of Malkangiri district.

== Demographics ==
According to the 2011 Census of India the total population of the village was around 3,659, including approximately 1,953 males and 1,706 females, with a sex ratio of 873 females per 1,000 males.

== Infrastructure ==
Govindapally has the Biju Pattnaik College of Education and a Government Higher Secondary School which offers courses in Science and Commerce. Apart from these educational institutions there are also two primary schools. A primary health centre and a police outpost are some other establishments present in this town.

== Transportation ==
National Highway 326 passes through this town and connects it to other places in the country by road.
