= W. V. V. B. Ramalingam =

Indian independence activist

Wunnava Venkata Varaha Buchi Ramalingam
- Born: 1 November 1884; Berhampur, Madras Presidency, India
- Died: 7 April 1962 (aged 78)
- Occupation(s): Mathematics teacher and freedom fighter
- Spouse: W. Mahalakshmi (Pillamma)
- Children: 3

Wunnava Venkata Varaha Buchi Ramalingam was an Indian independence activist from Berhampur in the Ganjam district of the erstwhile Madras Presidency of British India. He was a mathematics teacher and vice-principal at Khallikote College, president of the Bengal and Nagpur Railway Associations and also a road contractor.
