= Ballipadar =

- Village
- Location in Odisha, India Ballipadar (India)
- Coordinates: 19.7333°N 84.7167°E
- Country: India
- State: Odisha
- District: Ganjam
- Elevation: 84 m (276 ft)

Population (2020)
  - Total: 15,000

Languages
  - Official: Oriya
- Time zone: UTC+5:30 (IST)
- PIN: 761117
- Telephone code: 06818
- Vehicle registration: OR-07; OD-07
- Website: odisha.gov.in

Ballipadar is a village in Odisha, India, under the Buguda block of Ganjam district. It is also a "Grama Panchayat," consisting of 3 villages: Balipadar, Sadasiba Pur Sasan and Sana Balipadar. According to the 2011 census, it has a population of 5417 in 1166 households.

It should not be confused with Balipadar in the Badagada subdistrict or Balipadar in the Brahmapur Sadar subdistrict.

Jogigumpha, situated in the southwest of Balipdar, is famous for the Bhanj dynasty workshop of Silpi Jogi Maharana. Jogi Maharana belongs to the Soma Vansa Bhardwaj Gotra. He made a wooden doll named Kalabati that looked like a beautiful living girl.
