= Patrapur =

- Town
- Location in Orissa, India
- Coordinates: 19°07′55″N 84°34′13″E
- Country: India
- State: Odisha
- District: Ganjam

Government
  - Type: Notified Area Council
  - Body: Patrapur NAC

Population (2011)
  - Total: 6,059

Languages
  - Official: Odia
- Time zone: UTC+5:30 (IST)
- PIN: 761004
- Telephone code: 0680
- Vehicle registration: OD-07
- Nearest Town: Chikiti; Ichapuram (Andhra Pradesh)
- Sex ratio: 50%-50% ♂/♀
- Climate: normal (Köppen)

Patrapur is a town and Notified Area Council (NAC) in Ganjam district situated south of Odisha bordering Andhra Pradesh. It is located southwest of Brahmapur and southeast of Chikiti.

Patrapur is a business center catering to surrounding villages. The major occupations are agriculture, trading and self-employment. People are dependent on rain for crops. There are 3 Primary Schools, one Middle English School, one Girls' High School and one Co-educational High School. Banks like State Bank of India, Canara Bank, Co-operative Bank and important offices like JMFC Court, Block Office, Tahasil Office, Sub-Registrar Office, a Community Health Centre (C.H.C.), Fire Station and other establishments encourage people from nearby villages to come to the town. People speak Odia as mother tongue, however Telugu is an additional language because Patrapur borders with Andhra Pradesh.
