= Budheisuni =

- Village
- Location in Odisha, India Budheisuni (India)
- Coordinates: 19.7°N 84.82°E
- Country: India
- State: Odisha
- District: Ganjam
- Elevation: 66 m (217 ft)

Population (2014)
  - Total: 1,800

Languages
  - Official: Odia
- Time zone: UTC+5:30 (IST)
- PIN: 761105
- Telephone code: 06810
- Vehicle registration: OD-07
- Website: odisha.gov.in

Budheisuni is a village, gram panchayat (for 3 village known as Budheisuni, Gothali and laxanapali) and notified area committee in Ganjam district in the Indian state of Odisha. People of the village mainly depend upon cultivation, business, and very few people are working in government services and rest all are working in the textile industry at Surat and Ahmedabad. The village is surrounded with hills (dhimira), river (baghua) and ponds (kanchadei and godara). The neighbouring villages includes Chanchania Palli and Gothali Sodaka.

Budheisuni is located at . It has an average elevation of 66 metres (216 feet).

== Demographics ==
As of 2001 India census, Budheisuni had a population of 900. Males constitute 50% of the population and females 50%. Budheisuni has an average literacy rate of 53%, lower than the national average of 59.5%: male literacy is 63%, and female literacy is 43%. In Budheisuni, 13% of the population is under 6 years of age.
