= Gangapur, Odisha =

Gangapur
- Gram Panchayat
- Nickname: Ghumusar Gangapur
- Location in Odisha, India Gangapur (India)
- Coordinates: 19.7817°N 84.6091°E
- Country: India
- State: Odisha
- District: Ganjam

Government
  - Type: Democratic
  - Member of Legislative Assembly: Nilamani Bisoyi
  - Sarapanch: Nityananda Bisoyi
  - Village President: Nityananda Bisoyi
- Elevation: 81 m (266 ft)

Population (2011)
  - Total: 3,144

Languages
  - Official: Odia
- Time zone: UTC+5:30 (IST)
- PIN: 761123
- Telephone code: 06821
- Vehicle registration: OD-32
- Sub-division: Bhanjanagar
- Block: Bellaguntha
- Legislative Assembly Constituency: Surada
- Parliament Constituency: Aska

Gangapur is a village and a Gram panchayat in Bellaguntha block in Ganjam district in the state of Odisha, India.
