= Digapahandi Assembly constituency =

Constituency of the Odisha legislative assembly in India

Coordinates: 19.38°N 84.57°E

Digapahandi
- Constituency No. 134 for the Odisha Legislative Assembly
- Digapahandi assembly constituency in Ganjam district

Constituency details
- Country: India
- Region: East India
- State: Odisha
- Division: Southern Division
- District: Ganjam
- Lok Sabha constituency: Berhampur
- Established: 1957
- Total electors: 2,25,979 (Note: as on 2024) (Note: as data published by election commission)
- Reservation: None

Member of Legislative Assembly
- 17th Odisha Legislative Assembly
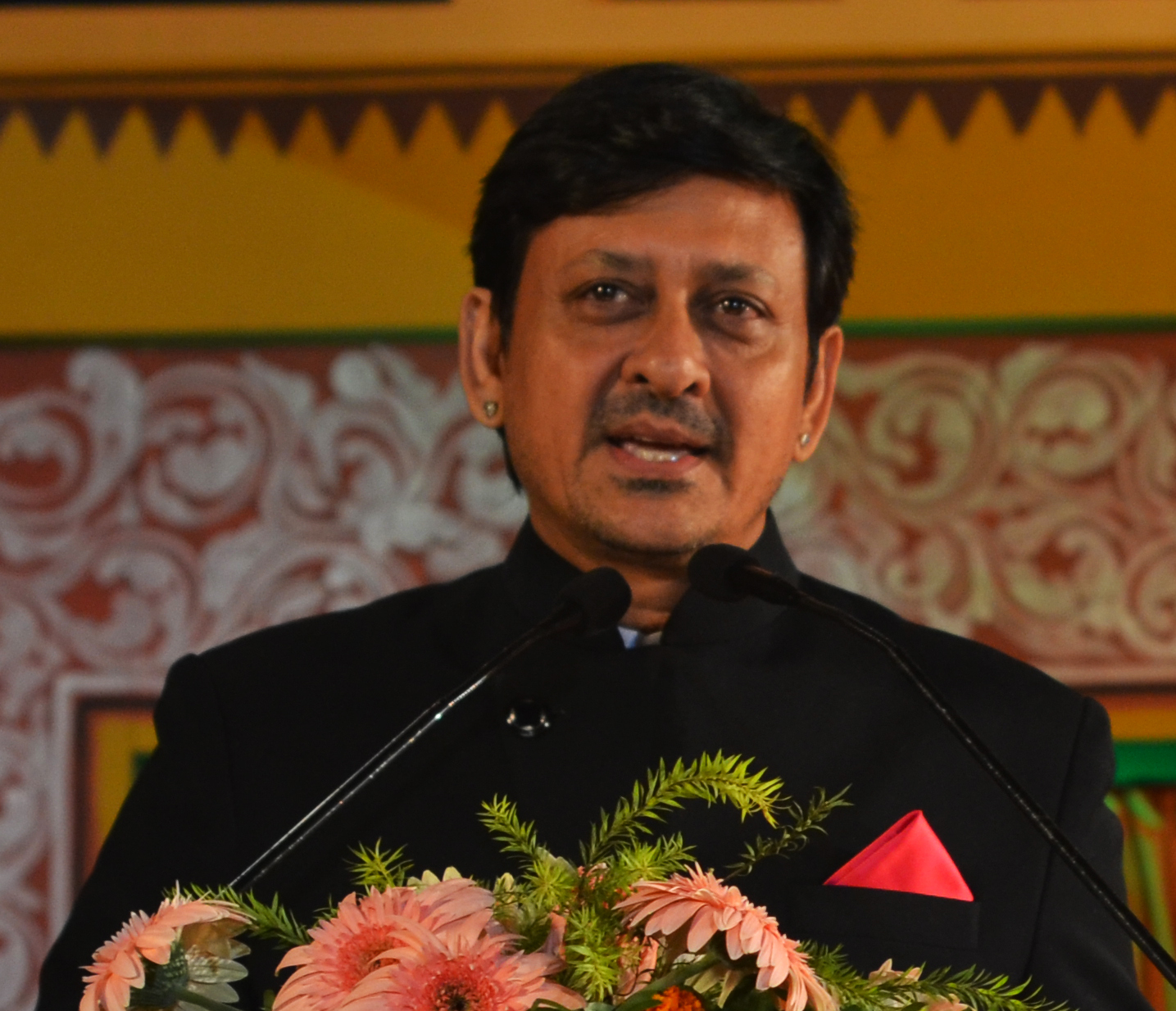
- Incumbent Sidhant Mohapatra
- Party: Bharatiya Janata Party
- Elected year: 2024

Digapahandi is a Vidhan Sabha constituency of Ganjam district, Odisha.

This constituency includes Digapahandi, Digapahandi block and 17 Gram panchayats (Rohigam, Baulajholi, Kukudakhandi, Masiakhali, Jagadalpur, Ankushpur, Dakshinapur, Ballipada, Lanjia, Dengapadar, Bontapalli, Anantayi, Lathi, Mohuda, Kankia, Sahala and Baghalati) of Kukudakhandi block.

Constituency didn't exist in between 1967 & 2008. It was revived in 2008 Delimitation and went for polls in 2009 election.

== Elected members ==
Vote share of winning candidates
2024	49.21%
2019	54.66%
2014	61.46%
2009	61.75%

Since its formation in 1957, 6 elections were held till date. It was a 2 member constituency in 1957.

List of members elected from Digapahandi constituency are

Year	Member	Party
2024	Sidhant Mohapatra	Bharatiya Janata Party
2019	Surjya Narayan Patro	Biju Janata Dal
2014	Surjya Narayan Patro	Biju Janata Dal
2009	Surjya Narayan Patro	Biju Janata Dal
1967-2009 : Constituency did not exist
1961	Raghunath Mahapatra	Indian National Congress
1957 (Note: It was a 2 member constituency)	Mohan Naik	Indian National Congress
1957	Ananga Manjari Devi	Indian National Congress

== Election results ==
=== 2024 ===
Voting were held on 13 May 2024 in 1st phase of Odisha Assembly Election & 4th phase of Indian General Election. Counting of votes was on 4 June 2024. In 2024 election, Bharatiya Janata Party candidate Sidhant Mohapatra defeated Biju Janata Dal candidate Biplab Patro by a margin of 16,847 votes.

2024 Vidhan Sabha Election, Digapahandi
Party	Candidate	Votes	%	±%
BJP	Sidhant Mohapatra	72,908	49.21	▲24.02
BJD	Biplab Patro	56,061	37.84	▼16.82
INC	Saka Sujit Kumar	10,090	6.81	▼6.17
NOTA	None of the above	1,338	0.90	▼0.69
Majority		16,847	11.37	▼18.10
Turnout		1,48,167	65.57	▲1.58
BJP gain from BJD				

=== 2019 ===
In 2019 election, Biju Janata Dal candidate Surjya Narayan Patro defeated Bharatiya Janata Party candidate Pinky Pradhan by a margin of 40,452 votes.

2019 Odisha Legislative Assembly election: Digapahandi
Party	Candidate	Votes	%	±%
BJD	Surjya Narayan Patro	75,016	54.66	
BJP	Pinky Pradhan	34,564	25.19	
INC	Prafulla Panda	17,815	12.98	
NOTA	None of the above	2,185	1.59	
Majority		40,452	29.47	
Turnout		1,37,232	63.99	
BJD hold				

=== 2014 ===
In 2014 election, Biju Janata Dal candidate Surjya Narayan Patro defeated Indian National Congress candidate Saka Sujit Kumar by a margin of 45,897 votes.

2014 Vidhan Sabha Election, Digapahandi
Party	Candidate	Votes	%	±%
BJD	Surjya Narayan Patro	78,949	61.46	▼0.29
INC	Saka Sujit Kumar	33,052	25.73	▼5.0
BJP	Bijaya Kumar Swain	7,771	6.05	▲2.15
NOTA	None of the above	2,397	1.87	−
Majority		45,897	35.73	▲4.71
Turnout		1,28,466	68.65	▲5.83
Registered electors		1,87,134		
BJD hold				

=== 2009 ===
In 2009 election, Biju Janata Dal candidate Surjya Narayan Patro defeated Indian National Congress candidate V. Rabi Narayan Raju by a margin of 32,763 votes.

2009 Vidhan Sabha Election, Digapahandi
Party	Candidate	Votes	%	±%
BJD	Surjya Narayan Patro	65,219	61.75	−
INC	V. Rabi Narayan Raju	32,456	30.73	−
BJP	Shreedhar Dev	4,119	3.90	−
Majority		32,763	31.02 (Note: %of total valid votes)	−
Turnout		1,05,630	62.82	−
BJD win (new seat)				
