= Golanthara =

- City
- Location in Odisha, India Golanthara (India) Golanthara (Asia)
- Coordinates: 19°13′1″N 84°44′41″E
- Country: India
- State: Odisha
- District: Ganjam
- Elevation: 64 m (210 ft)

Population (2001)
  - Total: 6,023

Languages
  - Official: Odia
- Time zone: UTC+5:30 (IST)
- PIN: 761008
- Telephone code: 0680

Golanthara is a village located in the southern part of Ganjam District of Odisha, India.
