= Kanisi, Berhampur =

Kanisi
- Village
- Location in Orissa, India
- Coordinates: 19.246116°N 84.768641°E
- Country: India
- State: Odisha
- District: Ganjam
- Elevation: 29 m (95 ft)

Languages
  - Official: Odia
- Time zone: UTC+5:30 (IST)
- PIN: 761008
- Telephone code: 0680

Kanisi is one of the 23 Tahasils in Ganjam district in the Indian state of Odisha.
