= Buguda =

- Town
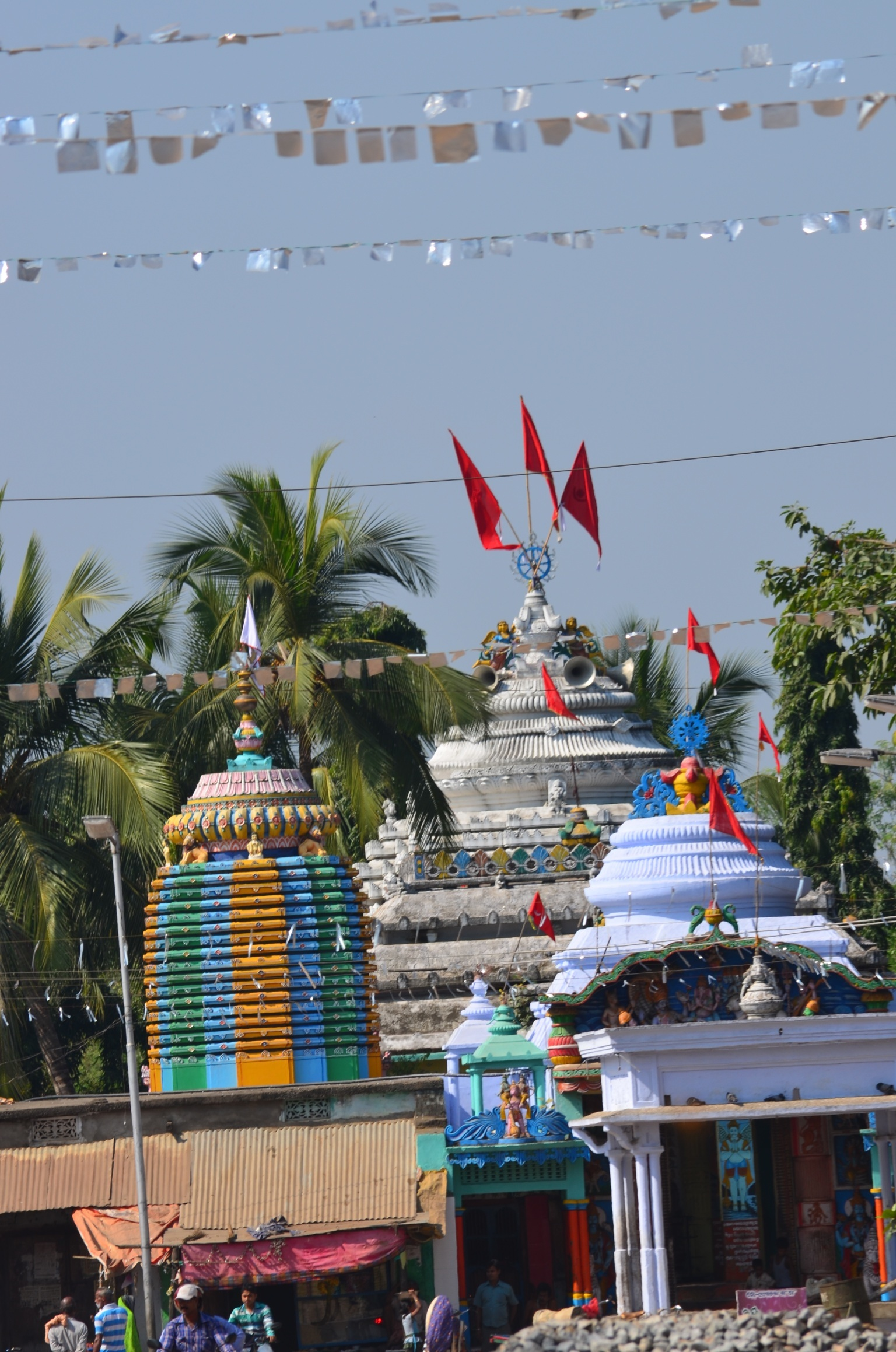
- The Jagannath temple at Buguda

- Location in Odisha, India Buguda (India)
- Coordinates: 19.82°N 84.8°E
- Country: India
- State: Odisha
- District: Ganjam
- Established: 31/7/2020
- Elevation: 84 m (276 ft)

Population (2011)
  - Total: 15,176

Languages
  - Official: Oriya
- Time zone: UTC+5:30 (IST)
- PIN: 761118
- Telephone code: 06818
- Vehicle registration: OR-07; OD-07; OD-32 ( Only for Bhanjanagar RTO )
- Website: odisha.gov.in

Buguda is a town in the Ghumusara area of Ganjam district in the state of Odisha, India. Buguda is approximately 70 kilometres from Berhampur.

== Geography ==
Buguda is located at 19.82°N 84.8°E. It has an average elevation of 84 meteres (275 feet).

== Demographics ==
As of 2011's India census, Buguda had a population of 13,253. Males constituted 51% of the population and females 49%. Buguda has an average literacy rate of 67%, higher than the national average of 59.5%; with a male literacy rate of 76% and a female literacy rate of 58%. 14% of the population is under 6 years of age.

Religion in Buguda
Hinduism	99.74%
Islam	0.04%
Christianity	0.03%
Sikh	0.01%
Buddhist	0.00%
Jain	0.00%
Not Stated	0.18%
Other	0.00%

== Climate and regional setting ==
Maximum summer temperature is 37 °C; minimum winter temperature is 14 °C. The mean daily temperature varies from 33 °C to 38 °C. May is the hottest month; December is the coldest. The average annual rainfall is 1250 mm and the region receives monsoon and torrential rainfall from July to October.

Climate data for Buguda, Odisha
Month	Jan	Feb	Mar	Apr	May	Jun	Jul	Aug	Sep	Oct	Nov	Dec	Year
Mean daily maximum °C (°F)	26 (79)	29 (84)	34 (93)	36 (97)	37 (99)	34 (93)	31 (88)	30 (86)	31 (88)	31 (88)	29 (84)	27 (81)	31 (88)
Mean daily minimum °C (°F)	14 (57)	18 (64)	22 (72)	26 (79)	28 (82)	28 (82)	26 (79)	26 (79)	25 (77)	22 (72)	18 (64)	14 (57)	22 (72)
Average rainfall mm (inches)	15.50 (0.61)	17.40 (0.69)	21.70 (0.85)	21.00 (0.83)	40.30 (1.59)	156.00 (6.14)	310.00 (12.20)	294.50 (11.59)	204.00 (8.03)	96.10 (3.78)	30.00 (1.18)	18.60 (0.73)	1,225.1 (48.22)
Source: MSM Weather
