= Kodala =

- Town
- Location in Odisha, India Kodala (India)
- Coordinates: 19.63°N 84.95°E
- Country: India
- State: Odisha
- District: Ganjam
- Elevation: 16 m (52 ft)

Population (2011)
  - Total: 13,965

Languages
  - Official: Oriya
- Time zone: UTC+5:30 (IST)
- PIN: 761032
- Telephone code: 06810
- Vehicle registration: OR-07; OD-07
- Website: odisha.gov.in

Kodala is a town and a Notified Area Council in Ganjam District in the Indian State of Odisha.

== Geography ==
Kodala is located at 19.63°N 84.95°E. It has an average elevation of 16 metres (52 feet).

== Demographics ==
As of 2001 India census, Kodala had a population of 12,341. Males constitute 50% of the population and females 50%. Kodala has an average literacy rate of 54%, lower than the national average of 59.5%: male literacy is 66%, and female literacy is 42%. In Kodala, 15% of the population is under 6 years of age.

Religion in Kodala
Hinduism	98.80%
Islam	0.91%
Christianity	0.07%
Sikh	0.00%
Buddhist	0.00%
Jain	0.00%
Not Stated	0.22%
Other	0.00%

== Politics ==
Current MLA V Sugyanikumar Deo 2014-2019 MLA from Kabisuryanagar Assembly constituency is Niranjan Pradhan of BJD, who won the seat in State elections in 2004. Rama Krushna Pattanaik won this seat as BJD candidate in 2000, as JD in 1995 and 1990, and as JND candidate in 1985 and 1977. Kanhu Charan Naik of INC(I) had won this seat in 1980.

Kodala is part of Aska (Lok Sabha constituency).

== Climate and regional setting ==
Maximum summer temperature is 37 °C; minimum winter temperature is 17 °C. The mean daily temperature varies from 33 °C to 38 °C. May is the hottest month; December is the coldest. The average annual rainfall is 1250 mm and the region receives monsoon and torrential rainfall from July to October.

Climate data for Kodala, Odisha
Month	Jan	Feb	Mar	Apr	May	Jun	Jul	Aug	Sep	Oct	Nov	Dec	Year
Mean daily maximum °C (°F)	27 (81)	30 (86)	34 (93)	36 (97)	37 (99)	34 (93)	32 (90)	31 (88)	32 (90)	32 (90)	30 (86)	28 (82)	32 (90)
Mean daily minimum °C (°F)	16 (61)	19 (66)	23 (73)	27 (81)	29 (84)	28 (82)	27 (81)	27 (81)	26 (79)	23 (73)	20 (68)	16 (61)	23 (74)
Average rainfall mm (inches)	12.40 (0.49)	17.40 (0.69)	18.60 (0.73)	15.00 (0.59)	40.30 (1.59)	150.00 (5.91)	282.10 (11.11)	272.80 (10.74)	180.00 (7.09)	93.00 (3.66)	33.00 (1.30)	18.60 (0.73)	1,133.2 (44.63)
Source: MSM Weather
