= Jagannathprasad =

- Town
- Nickname: JNP
- Location in Odisha, India Jagannathprasad (India)
- Coordinates: 19.97°N 84.77°E
- Country: India
- State: Odisha
- District: Ganjam
- Named for: The Blessings of Lord Jagannath

Government
  - Type: Notified Area Council
  - Body: Jagannath Prasad NAC
  - Member of Legislative Assembly: Pradyumna Kumar Nayak (BJP)
  - Member of Parliament: Sukanta Kumar Panigrahi (BJP)
- Elevation: 11 m (36 ft)

Population (2011)
  - Total: 79,901 (JNP Block) 4,527 (JNP Only)

Languages
  - Official: Odia
- Time zone: UTC+5:30 (IST)
- PIN: 761121
- Telephone code: 06818
- Vehicle registration: OR-07; OD-07 (Chhatrapur RTO); OD-32 (Bhanjanagar RTO)
- District: Ganjam
- Panchayat Samiti (Block): Jagannathprasad
- Legislative Assembly Constituency: Bhanjanagar
- Parliament Constituency: Kandhamal

Jagannathprasad is a town and Notified Area Council (NAC) in Ganjam district of Indian state Odisha.

== Demographics ==
As of 2011 India census, Jagannathprasad had a population of 4,527. Males constitute 50.98% of the population (i.e. 2308) and females 49.02% (i.e. 2219). 10.13% of the population (i.e. 459) is under 6 years of age.

== Jagannath Prasad Block ==
List of all towns and Villages in JAGANNATH PRASAD Block of Ganjam district, Odisha with population details according to 2011 census data.

| # | Villages | Population |
|---|---|---|
| 1 | Akulakumpa | 101 |
| 2 | Alasuguma | 2,986 |
| 3 | Alladi | 1,301 |
| 4 | Angyaprasad | 1,107 |
| 5 | Banikhola | 40 |
| 6 | Barabara | 55 |
| 7 | Beguniadiha | 380 |
| 8 | Bhabasara | 811 |
| 9 | Bhuktabhumi | 747 |
| 10 | Bhusandapala | 855 |
| 11 | Bijayadhanurjayapur | 1,379 |
| 12 | Budurungu | 1,070 |
| 13 | Chadheiapalli | 2,215 |
| 14 | Chancharapalli | 190 |
| 15 | Charikonia | 1,029 |
| 16 | Chelakhai | 57 |
| 17 | Chhamunda | 3,686 |
| 18 | Chikili | 1,234 |
| 19 | Chopara | 1,682 |
| 20 | Deullapalli | 70 |
| 21 | Dhimiripalli | 126 |
| 22 | Dhodapalli | 634 |
| 23 | Dungapalli | 559 |
| 24 | Ekagharia | 131 |
| 25 | Ekaghariapalli | 186 |
| 26 | Gadisapalli | 727 |
| 27 | Gandadhara | 1,053 |
| 28 | Ganiapalli | 194 |
| 29 | Gochabadi | 1,803 |
| 30 | Gundurisahi | 671 |
| 31 | Haripur | 1,229 |
| 32 | Jagannathprasad | 4,527 |
| 33 | Jagannathpur | 361 |
| 34 | Jamagarada | 802 |
| 35 | Jhadabhumi | 1,879 |
| 36 | Jhadasahi | 612 |
| 37 | Jirabadi | 2,366 |
| 38 | Jodabandha | 644 |
| 39 | Kadapada | 1,434 |
| 40 | Kaduamangarajpur | 1,966 |
| 41 | Kamasaragada | 2,408 |
| 42 | Kandarasingi | 1,356 |
| 43 | Kandhanuapalli | 1,128 |
| 44 | Karadapalli | 357 |
| 45 | Khairanati | 763 |
| 46 | Khamarapalli | 1,353 |
| 47 | Kriadhara | 139 |
| 48 | Kumpapada | 2,945 |
| 49 | Kumunda | 1,170 |
| 50 | Kumundi | 622 |
| 51 | Kusapali | 752 |
| 52 | Lepa | 332 |
| 53 | Mahuliagada | 484 |
| 54 | Malingi | 603 |
| 55 | Mentapur | 864 |
| 56 | Nada | 959 |
| 57 | Paikarapalli | 798 |
| 58 | Panchabhuti | 4,649 |
| 59 | Pandiripada | 180 |
| 60 | Pankalasahi | 670 |
| 61 | Pantiama | 21 |
| 62 | Pattadhara | 2,441 |
| 63 | Pelapada | 383 |
| 64 | Ranibhumi | 617 |
| 65 | Rauti | 1,891 |
| 66 | Sarakumpa | 564 |
| 67 | Singipur | 1,654 |
| 68 | Sisunda | 1,240 |
| 69 | Sorisamuli | 666 |
| 70 | Sugumu | 195 |
| 71 | Talaponka | 113 |
| 72 | Tamanada | 1,329 |
| 73 | Taraffa | 778 |
| 74 | Tentulia | 832 |
| 75 | Tholanda | 1,446 |
| 76 | Tikarapalli | 300 |

== Geography ==
Latitude 19.9406685 Longitude 84.9125509 It is in the 11 m elevation(altitude) above sea level.

=== Weather and Climate ===
Jagannathprasad is hot in summer, the highest day temperature ranges between 30 °C to 37 °C. The average temperature of January is 23 °C, February is 24 °C, March is 28 °C, April is 30 °C, May is 31 °C.

== Famous places ==
The following are popular recreational spots of Jagannathprasad:

- Lankagada Dam (Picnic Spot)
- Rani Gonda Water Reservoir
- Raghunath Jiu Temple
- Sri Dadhibaman Jiu & Jagannath Temple

== Transport ==
- By road : Jagannath Prasad is located on State Highway 21, connecting Bhanjanagar to Nayagarh.
- By rail : Brahmapur railway station is the nearest railway station which is about 110 km from Jagannath Prasad.
- By air : Biju Patnaik International Airport is about 140 km far from the town.

== Banks ==
- Indian Bank, Jagannath Prasad (IFSC Code : IDIB000J001, MICR Code: 761019009)
- State Bank Of India, Jagannath Prasad (IFSC Code : SBIN0012113, MICR Code: 760002508)
- Utkal Grameen Bank, Jagannath Prasad (IFSC Code : SBIN0RRUKGB)
- The Aska Coop Central Bank Limited (IFSC Code : UTIB0SASKAC)
- Union Bank of India, Jagannath Prasad (IFSC Code : UBIN0591203)

== Education institutions in Jagannath Prasad ==
=== Elementary and Higher Secondary Schools ===
- Nodal U.P. School, Jagannath Prasad
- Judhisthir Bidyapitha (Boys' High School)
- N.P. Girls' High School
- Odisha Adarsha Vidyalaya, Jagannath Prasad (located at Jamagarada, 5 km from JNP)
- Apart from the above schools, there are 3 more Govt. U.P. schools and 4 private schools

=== Colleges ===
- Anchalika Higher Secondary School (+2 Arts, Science, Commerce)
- Government Vocational Higher Secondary School (+2EDA & OM)
- Anchalika Degree Mahavidyalaya (+3 Arts)
