= Polasara =

- Town
- Location in Odisha, India Polasara (India)
- Coordinates: 19.7°N 84.82°E
- Country: India
- State: Odisha
- District: Ganjam
- Elevation: 66 m (217 ft)

Population (2020)
  - Total: 43,000+

Languages
  - Official: Odia
- Time zone: UTC+5:30 (IST)
- PIN: 761105
- Telephone code: 06810
- Vehicle registration: OR-07; OD-07
- Website: odisha.gov.in

Polasara is a town and a Municipality in Ganjam district in the Indian state of Odisha.

== Geography ==
Polasara is located at 19.7°N 84.82°E. It has an average elevation of 66 metres (216 feet).

== Demographics ==
As of 2011 India census, Polasara had a population of 23,119 of which 11,876 are males while 11,243 are females. the female sex ratio is 947 against state average of 979. Moreover, the child sex ratio in Polasara is around 872 compared to Orissa state average of 941. As of 2025, Polasara Municipality has an estimated population of around 43,000. The literacy rate of Polasara city is 78.63% higher than the state average of 72.87%. In Polasara, male literacy is around 87.05% while the female literacy rate is 69.84%.

Religion in Polasara
| Hinduism | 99.69% |
| Islam | 0.20% |
| Christianity | 0.02% |
| Sikh | 0.00% |
| Buddhist | 0.01% |
| Jain | 0.00% |
| Not Stated | 0.07% |
| Other | 0.00% |

== Climate and regional setting ==
Maximum summer temperature is 37 °C; minimum winter temperature is 16 °C. The mean daily temperature varies from 33 °C to 38 °C. May is the hottest month; December is the coldest. The average annual rainfall is 1250 mm and the region receives monsoon and torrential rainfall from July to October.

Climate data for Polasara, Odisha
| Month | Jan | Feb | Mar | Apr | May | Jun | Jul | Aug | Sep | Oct | Nov | Dec | Year |
|---|---|---|---|---|---|---|---|---|---|---|---|---|---|
| Mean daily maximum °C (°F) | 27 (81) | 30 (86) | 34 (93) | 36 (97) | 37 (99) | 34 (93) | 32 (90) | 31 (88) | 32 (90) | 32 (90) | 30 (86) | 28 (82) | 32 (90) |
| Mean daily minimum °C (°F) | 16 (61) | 19 (66) | 23 (73) | 27 (81) | 29 (84) | 28 (82) | 27 (81) | 27 (81) | 26 (79) | 23 (73) | 20 (68) | 16 (61) | 23 (74) |
| Average rainfall cm (inches) | 1.20 (0.47) | 1.70 (0.67) | 1.90 (0.75) | 1.50 (0.59) | 4.00 (1.57) | 15.00 (5.91) | 28.20 (11.10) | 27.30 (10.75) | 18.00 (7.09) | 9.30 (3.66) | 3.30 (1.30) | 1.90 (0.75) | 113.3 (44.61) |
Source: MSM Weather
