= Digapahandi =

Digapahandi Bada Khemundi
- Town
- Location in Odisha, India Digapahandi (India)
- Coordinates: 19.37°N 84.58°E
- Country: India
- State: Odisha
- District: Ganjam

Government
  - Type: NAC
  - Body: Digapahandi Notified Area Council
- Elevation: 53 m (174 ft)

Population (2011)
  - Total: 13,190

Languages
  - Official: Odia
- Time zone: UTC+5:30 (IST)
- PIN: 761012
- Telephone code: 06814
- Vehicle registration: OD-07
- Website: odisha.gov.in

Digapahandi (formerly known as Bada Khemundi) is a town and a Notified Area Council (N.A.C.) in Ganjam district in the state of Odisha, India. There are 171 small villages which come under Digapahandi tahasil and largely dependent on this town for their business and livelihood. Digapahandi town is divided into 11 wards, comprising Bazar street, Sunari street, New street, Phulasundari Street, Balaji Nagar Bada Brahmin street, Sana Brahmin street, Sasan street, Chikitia street, Rani street, Annapurna street, Anchala street, Uparabasa, Chikiti road.

== Geography ==
Digapahandi is located at 19.37°N 84.58°E. It has an average elevation of 53 metres (173 feet).

== Demographics ==
As of 2011 India census, The Digapahandi Notified Area Committee has the population of 13,190 of which 6,679 are males while 6,511 are females. The population of Children with age of 0-6 is 1454 which is 11.02% of total population of Digapahandi (NAC). The literacy rate of Digapahandi city is 78.36% higher than the state average of 72.87%. In Digapahandi, Male literacy is around 85.61% while female literacy rate is 70.98%.

Religion in Digapahandi
Hinduism	99.04%
Islam	0.70%
Christianity	0.07%
Sikh	0.03%
Buddhist	0.00%
Jain	0.00%
Not Stated	0.17%
Other	0.00%

== Economy ==
Most families of this town depend on their business. Some people are cultivators/farmer & teachers. There are no big industries in this area, 20-30 Granite industries are there. This is a junction (Punjikayaan) for the state highways (29 & 17) SH17 and NH326 runs on same road.

== Education ==
The town has two government high schools namely Bada Khemundi High School for boys and Govt. Girls High School. The two colleges here are Khemundi college and Biju Patnaik Women's College. Besides, there is a Central Government School which is Kendriya Vidyalaya at Digapahandi(Since 2010). There are about 20 numbers of primary / M.E schools. There are 3 Sishu Mandirs, from which one of the Sishu Mandir is under Sikshya Bikash Samiti that consist of classes from 1st to 10th class. Bina Pani nursery school is the oldest (1986) English/Odia primary school consist lkg to STD 5th. Advance Computer Training Institute [ACTI] is a leading computer training institute accredited by NIELIT, Govt. of India for 'O' Level, 'A' Level, NSQF courses & Digital Literacy courses. It is also an Authorised Learning Center of OKCL for OS-CIT & OCOC courses.

== Climate and regional setting ==
Maximum summer temperature is 37 °C; minimum winter temperature is 16 °C. The mean daily temperature varies from 33 °C to 38 °C. May is the hottest month; December is the coldest. The average annual rainfall is 1250 mm and the region receives monsoon and torrential rainfall from July to October.

Climate data for Digapahandi, Odisha
Month	Jan	Feb	Mar	Apr	May	Jun	Jul	Aug	Sep	Oct	Nov	Dec	Year
Mean daily maximum °C (°F)	27 (81)	30 (86)	34 (93)	36 (97)	37 (99)	34 (93)	32 (90)	31 (88)	32 (90)	32 (90)	30 (86)	28 (82)	32 (90)
Mean daily minimum °C (°F)	16 (61)	19 (66)	23 (73)	27 (81)	29 (84)	28 (82)	27 (81)	27 (81)	26 (79)	20 (68)	—	16 (61)	—
Average rainfall mm (inches)	12.40 (0.49)	17.40 (0.69)	18.60 (0.73)	15.00 (0.59)	40.30 (1.59)	150.00 (5.91)	282.10 (11.11)	272.80 (10.74)	180.00 (7.09)	93.00 (3.66)	33.00 (1.30)	18.60 (0.73)	1,133.2 (44.63)
Source: MSM Weather

== Politics ==
BJP, BJD & INC are the major political parties in this area. See Digapahandi (Odisha Vidhan Sabha constituency).

== Facilities ==
The town has one tehsil office, one Block office, one JMFC court, two post offices, one government hospital, one police station, one fire station, one irrigation office, one fishery office, one veterinary, one govt guest house, one sub jail, one excise office & banks namely SBI, Canara, Andhra, BOI, Axis, Baroda etc.

== Places of interest ==
The Ujjaleswar Temple situated nearly 19 km from Digapahandi. The shrine of Ujjaleswar has been developed from a cave temple, on a hillock which is approachable by steps. A huge stone shadowing the deity forms the back side of the temple, which has been also chiseled to steps for facilitating a circumambulating around the shrine.

There is a devi temple known as Chamundeswari temple at the peak of changudei hills, which is 1-2 km away from the Punjikayan square, the main square of the town.

Ghodahada dam with spectacular scenic view is present near the Ujjaleswara temple, nearly 18-20 km from the main town.

The city hosts a variety range of temples related to Sri Vishnu, Radha Krishna, Sri patitapabana which date back to 15-17th century AD typically built in Kalinga architecture.

The two lion statues with a height of 20-30 ft situated in front of the old ruined palace is the major landmark of the city.
