= Bhanjanagar =

Bhanjanagar Russellkonda
- City
- Location in Odisha, India Bhanjanagar (India)
- Coordinates: 19°55′29″N 84°34′54″E
- Country: India
- State: Odisha
- District: Ganjam
- Named for: Kabi Samrat Upendra Bhanja

Government
  - Type: Municipality
  - Body: Bhanjanagar Municipal Council
  - Member of Parliament: Sukanta Kumar Panigrahi (BJP)
  - Member of Legislative Assembly: Pradyumna Kumar Nayak (BJP)

Area
  - Total: 635.80 km^{2} (245.48 sq mi)
- Elevation: 69 m (226 ft)

Population (2011)
  - Total: 20,482
  - Density: 32.215/km^{2} (83.435/sq mi)

Languages
  - Official: Odia
- Time zone: UTC+5:30 (IST)
- PIN: 761126
- Telephone code: 06821
- Vehicle registration: OD-32
- Website: odisha.gov.in

Bhanjanagar is a city and Municipality in Ganjam district in the state of Odisha, India.

== Geography ==
Bhanjanagar is located at 19.93°N 84.58°E with an average elevation of 69 metres (226 feet).

Bhanjanagar hosts the headquarters for the Bhanjanagar Sub-division, Ghumusar DFO, Bhanjanagar SDPO, Ghumusar Tahasil, Bhanjanagar Block, and Education Block. Bhanjanagar Block shares its borders with Surada, Bellaguntha, Jagannath Prasad Blocks of Ganjam district and G. Udayagiri, Raikia, Chakapada Blocks of Kandhamal district. There are 139 villages in Bhanjanagar Block while Bhanjanagar city is administered as a Municipality. The city is located beside Bhanjanagar Dam.

== History ==
Bhanjanagar is a planned community situated in the confluence of rivers Loharakhandi and Badanadi. Earlier, this patch of land used to be a part of Ghumusar Zamindari of Bhanja dynasty whose headquarter was in Kulada. During British Raj this place became their administrative ground. The town, earlier named as Russellkonda a.k.a. Russell's Hill after George Russell (President of then Board of Revenue) was renamed later as Bhanjanagar in the memory of Kabi Samrat Upendra Bhanja, a poet in Odia literary history.

On 31 August 2025, the Government of Odisha upgraded Bhanjanagar NAC to be a Municipality.

== Nearby villages ==
- Benakunda
- Agajhola
- Kaindi
- Jilundi
- Baruda
- Golapada
- Kullada
- Turumu
- Gallery
- Sardula
- Daha
- Chhedabhumi
- Lalsingi
- Badakodanda
- Baradanda

== Demographics ==
Religion in Bhanjanagar
Hinduism	96.26%
Islam	2.36%
Christianity	1.10%
Sikh	0.01%
Buddhist	0.01%
Jain	0.00%
Not Stated	0.25%
Other	0.00%

According to the 2011 India census, Bhanjanagar had a population of 20,482.

== Climate and regional setting ==
Maximum summer temperature is 46 °C; minimum winter temperature is 14 °C. The mean daily temperature varies from 33 °C to 38 °C. May is the hottest month; December is the coldest. The average annual rainfall is 1250 mm and the region receives monsoon and torrential rainfall from July to October.

Climate data for Bhanjanagar, Odisha
Month	Jan	Feb	Mar	Apr	May	Jun	Jul	Aug	Sep	Oct	Nov	Dec	Year
Mean daily maximum °C (°F)	26 (79)	29 (84)	34 (93)	36 (97)	37 (99)	34 (93)	31 (88)	30 (86)	31 (88)	31 (88)	29 (84)	27 (81)	31 (88)
Mean daily minimum °C (°F)	14 (57)	18 (64)	22 (72)	26 (79)	28 (82)	28 (82)	26 (79)	26 (79)	25 (77)	22 (72)	18 (64)	14 (57)	22 (72)
Average rainfall mm (inches)	15.50 (0.61)	17.40 (0.69)	21.70 (0.85)	21.00 (0.83)	40.30 (1.59)	156.00 (6.14)	310.00 (12.20)	294.50 (11.59)	204.00 (8.03)	96.10 (3.78)	30.00 (1.18)	18.60 (0.73)	1,225.1 (48.22)
Source: MSM Weather

== Educational Institutions ==
=== Colleges ===
- Kabi Samrat Upendra Bhanja College
- Savitri Women's College
- Bhanja College of Computer & Management (B.C.C.M)
- Bhanja College of Nursing
- Academy of Rational Philosophy for Unanimously Agreeable and Constitutional Governance

=== Schools ===
- Kendriya Vidyalaya
- PT.SR DAV Public School
- Ghumusar Residential Higher Secondary School
- Upendra Bhanja High School
- Dina Bandhu Government Girls' High School
- Sribatsa High School
- P.S.B. School, RC Road
- Saraswati Sishu Vidya Mandira (Dihapadhala)
- Swami Vivekananda Public School
- Government Middle English Medium School (Bari School)
- St. Xavier's English Medium High School
- St. Anne's English Medium School
- Sri Satya Sai Vidya Vihar
- Kanhu Rauta High School (Lalsing)
- Dibya Shakti English Medium School (Niladri Bihar)
- Govt. Somanath Practicing High School

=== Training Institutes ===
- Kabi Samrat Upendra Bhanja College of Teacher Education (KSUB CTE)
- Govt. Elementary Teacher Education Institution (GETEI)
- Govt. Industrial Training Institute (ITI)
- Kalam Institute of Computer Studies (Autonomous body)
- BDPS Software Training (Estd. 1997), High School Square
- ITCT Computer Institute (Khalasi Sahi)
- Bhanjanagar Computer Academy
- MCC Academy
- OEIT Computer Institute, Landei sahi
- Adyaa Classes, Landei Sahi

== Industries ==
Bhanjanagar has fertile lands, and a number of rice paddy processing units, or rice mills.

== Culture ==
The Thakurani Yatra, Ratha Yatra and Danda Jatra festivals draw crowds to Bhanjanagar.

Apart from this, Dola Purnima, Durga Puja(Dussehra), Kumar Purnima, Pana Sankranti, Nurshingha Chaturthi, Ram Navami, Janmashtami, Danda Yatra, Ganesh Puja and Saraswati Puja are also celebrated. People with brotherhood celebrating all the festivals.

== Attractions and sites ==
A reservoir is located north of Bhanjanagar with a catchment area of 25 square miles (65 km^{2}). The water of this reservoir irrigates land in Ghumusar (Bhanjanagar), Berhampur and Chhatrapur sub-divisions, and also supplies drinking water to Bhanjanagar and Berhampur city. Construction was completed in the year 1894. The panoramic view of the reservoir is a popular tourist attraction. To increase further tourism, a huge park, named "Biju Patnaik Children's Park", in a natural surrounding with many Playing Instruments, a toy train, Science Park, Model Zoo, Road Train and swings for kids, boating facility, Family Train, 3D-Hall, Video Games, Aquarium, "Bhanja Doli", "Kalinga Boita" and last but not the least, an extraordinary and unique musical fountain were constructed for amusement. In April 2013, the tallest Shiva statue of Odisha (7th/8th-tallest Shiva statue in the world) was built at Beleswar Hill Top, located close to the water reservoir.

- Maa Soradevi Temple, College Road
- Shirdi Sai Temple, Bypass Road
- Kulada Vagdevi Temple, Kulada
- Jagannath Swami Temple, Kulada
- Vancheshwar Temple, Dhudhua
- The Divine Life Society, Bhanjangar Branch, Main Road, Bhanjanagar
- Gandhi Kailash Hill
- Vana Vihara
- Daha
- Deer Park
- Bhanja Sahitya Parishada

== Transport ==
- By Road: Bhanjanagar is connected with NH-157, SH-37 and SH-21 which connect Bhanjanagar to other cities and towns of Odisha. It is 80 kilometres (50 mi) from Brahmapur and 85 km from Phulbani and 40 kilometres from Asika.
- By Rail: Brahmapur railway station and Nayagarh railway station are the nearest railway halts.
- By Air: Biju Patnaik International Airport is about 170 km from the town.
