= Chikiti =

City in Odisha, India

- Town
- Location in Odisha, India Chikiti (India)
- Coordinates: 19.20°N 84.62°E
- Country: India
- State: Odisha
- District: Ganjam

Government
  - Type: NAC
  - Body: NAC
- Elevation: 40 m (130 ft)

Population (2011)
  - Total: 11,645

Languages
  - Official: Odia
- Time zone: UTC+5:30 (IST)
- PIN: 761010
- Telephone code: 06815
- Vehicle registration: OR 07/OD 07
- Website: www.ganjam.nic.in

Chikiti is a town and a notified area council located in Ganjam district in the state of Odisha, India.

== Geography ==
Chikiti is located at 19.20°N 84.62°E. It has an average elevation of 40 m (130 ft).

== Demographics ==
As of 2001 India census, Chikiti had a population of 10,801. Males constitute 50% of the population and females 50%. Chikiti has an average literacy rate of 63%, higher than the national average of 59.5% of that time; with male literacy of 74% and female literacy of 51%. 11% of the population is under 6 years of age.

Religion in Chikiti
Hinduism	99.03%
Islam	0.48%
Christianity	0.45%
Sikh	0.01%
Buddhist	0.00%
Jain	0.00%
Not Stated	0.03%
Other	0.00%

== Politics ==
Current MLA from Chikiti Assembly Constituency is Shmt. Usha Devi of BJD, who won the seat in State elections of 2019, 2014, 2009, 2004 and in 2000 and as a JD candidate in 1990. Previous MLAs from this seat include Chintamani Dyan Samantara who won as independent candidate in 1995 and 1980 and as an INC candidate in 1985, and Jagannath Pati of JNP in 1977.

Chikiti is part of Berhampur (Lok Sabha constituency).

== Climate and regional setting ==
Maximum summer temperature is 37 °C; minimum winter temperature is 16 °C. The mean daily temperature varies from 33 °C to 38 °C. May is the hottest month; December is the coldest. The average annual rainfall is 1250 mm and the region receives monsoon and torrential rainfall from July to October.

Climate data for Chikiti, Odisha
Month	Jan	Feb	Mar	Apr	May	Jun	Jul	Aug	Sep	Oct	Nov	Dec	Year
Mean daily maximum °C (°F)	27 (81)	30 (86)	34 (93)	36 (97)	37 (99)	34 (93)	32 (90)	31 (88)	32 (90)	32 (90)	30 (86)	28 (82)	32 (90)
Mean daily minimum °C (°F)	16 (61)	19 (66)	23 (73)	27 (81)	29 (84)	28 (82)	27 (81)	27 (81)	26 (79)	23 (73)	20 (68)	16 (61)	23 (74)
Average rainfall mm (inches)	12.40 (0.49)	17.40 (0.69)	18.60 (0.73)	15.00 (0.59)	40.30 (1.59)	150.00 (5.91)	282.10 (11.11)	272.80 (10.74)	180.00 (7.09)	93.00 (3.66)	33.00 (1.30)	18.60 (0.73)	1,133.2 (44.63)
Source: MSM Weather

== List of rulers ==
The genealogy of the rulers of Chikiti is given below.

1. Kesaba Rautara or Bira Karddama Singha Rautara (881-940)
2. Balabhadra Rautara (941-997)
3. Madhaba Rautara (998-1059)
4. Languli Rautara (1060-1094)
5. Mohana Rautara (1095-1143)
6. Balarama Rautara (1144-1197)
7. Biswanatha Rautara (1198-1249)
8. Harisarana Rautara (1250-1272)
9. Raghunatha Rautara (1273-1313)
10. Dinabandhu Rautara (1314-1364)
11. Gopinatha Rautara (1365-1417)
12. Ramachandra Rautara (1418-1464)
13. Narayana Rautara (1465-1530)
14. Narasingha Rautara (1531-1583)
15. Lokanatha Rautara (1584-1633)
16. Jadumani Rautara (1634-1691)
17. Madhusudana Rajendra Deba (1692-1736)
18. Kulamani Rajendra Deba (1737-1769)
19. Krusnachandra Rajendra Deba (1770-1790)
20. Pitambara Rajendra Deba (1791-1819)
21. Gobindachandra Rajendra Deba (1820-1831)
22. Kulamani Rajendra Deba (1832-1835)
23. Brundabanachandra Rajendra Deba (1835-1846)
24. Jagannatha Rajendra Deba (1847-1855)
25. Biswambhara Rajendra Deba (1856-1885)
26. Kisorachandra Rajendra Deba (1885-1903)
27. Radhamohana Rajendra Deba (1903–1923) and (1934–1937)
28. Gaurachandra Rajendra Deba ((1923–1934)
29. Court of Wards (1937–1945)
30. Sachhidananda Rajendra Deba (1945–1947)
