= Hinjilikatu =

Hinjilikatu Hinjilicut
- Town
- Location in Odisha, India Hinjilikatu (India)
- Coordinates: 19.48°N 84.75°E
- Country: India
- State: Odisha
- District: Ganjam

Government
  - Type: Municipality
  - Body: Hinjilicut Municipal Council
- Elevation: 30 m (98 ft)

Population (2011)
  - Total: 25,092

Languages
  - Official: Odia
- Time zone: UTC+5:30 (IST)
- PIN: 761102
- Telephone code: 06811
- Vehicle registration: OD 07
- Website: hinjilicutmunicipality.in

Hinjilikatu formerly Hinjilicut is a town and municipality of Ganjam district in the Indian state of Odisha.

== Geography ==
Hinjilikatu is located at 19.48°N 84.75°E. It has an average elevation of 30 m (98 ft).

== Demographics ==
As of 2011 India census, Hinjilicut had a total population of 1,62,779. Males constitute 51% of the population and females 49%. Hinjilicut has an average literacy 1,02,973, male literacy is 58,758, and female literacy is 44,215. In Hinjilicut, 13% of the population is under 6 years of age.

Greater Hinjilikatu population is 56,239.

== Politics ==
Current MLA from Hinjili Assembly Constituency is Naveen Patnaik of BJD, the Chief Minister of Odisha who won the seat in State elections of 2014 and also in 2009, 2004 and 2000. Previous MLAs from this seat were Udayanath Nayak of INC in 1995 and in 1985, Harihar Sahu of JD in 1990, and Brundaban Nayak who won in 1980 as JNP(SC) candidate and as an INC candidate in 1977.

Hinjili is part of Aska (Lok Sabha constituency).

== Notable people ==
- Naveen Patnaik – Chief Minister of Odisha
