= Belaguntha =

Belaguntha Bellaguntha
- Town
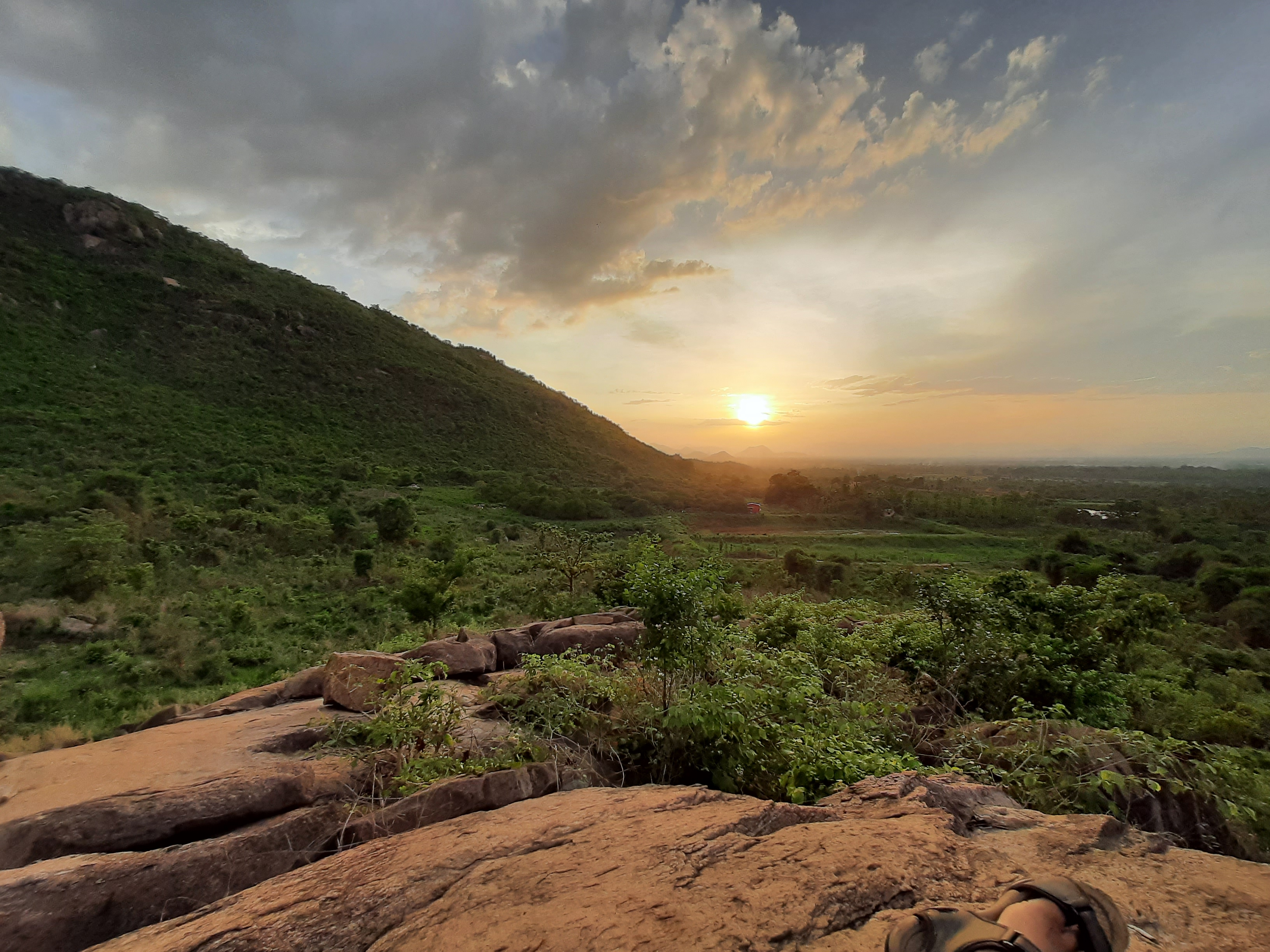
- Sunset at Kumarsuni Hill
- Nickname: The Brass Fish Town
- Location in Odisha, India Belaguntha (India)
- Coordinates: 19.88°N 84.65°E
- Country: India
- State: Odisha
- District: Ganjam

Government
  - Type: Notified Area Council (N.A.C.)
  - Body: Belaguntha N.A.C.
  - Executive Officer: Samanta Biswambhar Mohapatra
  - Member of Legislative Assezmbly: Nilamani Bisoyi (BJP)
  - Member of Parliament: Anita Subhadarshini (BJP)
- Elevation: 59 m (194 ft)

Population (2011)
  - Total: 11,297

Languages
  - Official: Odia
- Time zone: UTC+5:30 (IST)
- PIN: 761119
- Telephone code: 06821
- Vehicle registration: OD-32/OD-07
- District: Ganjam
- Block: Belaguntha
- Legislative Assembly Constituency: Surada
- Parliament Constituency: Aska
- Website: www.nacbellaguntha.in

Belaguntha or Bellaguntha is a town and a Notified Area Council (N.A.C.) in Odisha, India. It's famously known as The Brass Fish Town.

== Demographics ==
As of the 2011 Census of India, Bellaguntha had a population of 11297. Males constitute 49% of the population and females 51%. Bellaguntha has an average literacy rate of 67%, higher than the national average of 59.5%; with 55% of the males and 45% of females literate. 13% of the population is under 6 years of age.

Religion in Belaguntha
Hinduism	99.58%
Islam	0.27%
Christianity	0.09%
Sikh	0.02%
Buddhist	0.00%
Jain	0.00%
Not Stated	0.04%
Other	0.00%

== History ==
Nrusinghanatha temple attracts thousands of pilgrims to get a darshan of Lakshmi Nrusingh. The temple was established in the 18th century under the Bhanja Dynasty.

Bellaguntha was a local market town for Boudh and Phulbani. Local crafts include brass, silver, copper, and woodwork. There are more than twenty temples in the town.

== Geography ==
Bellaguntha is located at 19.88°N 84.65°E. It has an average elevation of 59 m (194 ft).

== Culture ==
Major local festivals include Thakurani Yatra, Ratha Yatra and Danda Jatra.

Other festivals include Dol Purnima, Durga Puja (Dussehra), Kumar Purnima, Pana Sankranti, Nurshingha Chaturthi, Ram Navami, Janmashtami, Makara Sankranti, Ganesh Puja and Saraswati Puja.

== Food ==
Some sweets are prepared for special festivals, such as Halua and Drakhya for Ratha Yatra and Satapuri for Satapuri Amabasya.

== Transport ==
- By Road: Bellaguntha is connected with State Highway 21 (Odisha) and State Highway 30 (Odisha) which connect to other cities and towns of Odisha.
- By Rail: Brahmapur railway station is the nearest railway station which is about 80 km from Bellaguntha.
- By Air: Biju Patnaik International Airport is about 160 km from the town.

== Local sites ==
- Sri LaxmiNrusingh Temple - an old temple
- Sri Jagannath Temple - Dadhibaman temple
- Sri Balunkeswara Temple - a temple made of red rock on the bank of a large pond
- Maa Bramhanadevi Temple - temple in a bamboo forest
- Sri Baidyanath Temple - a temple at Nayakpada a few kilometres away from the town
- Anikata is near Jirol Village. There is a dam at the confluence of the Loharakhandi and Bada rivers. Its main purpose was irrigation and flood protection.
- Sagar - ten fishery ponds excavated by Bhanja kings
- Kumarsuni Hills
- Sri Chandra Kalpeswar temple at Sasan Street.
- Lachhaman Balaji temple - an old math of monks
- Sri Bhagabat Temple Chasa Sahi
- Biju Pattnaik children's park

== Climate and regional setting ==
Maximum summer temperature is 37 °C; minimum winter temperature is 14 °C. The mean daily temperature varies from 33 °C to 38 °C. May is the hottest month; December is the coldest. The average annual rainfall is 1250 mm and the region receives monsoon and torrential rainfall from July to October.

Climate data for Belaguntha, Odisha
Month	Jan	Feb	Mar	Apr	May	Jun	Jul	Aug	Sep	Oct	Nov	Dec	Year
Mean daily maximum °C (°F)	26 (79)	29 (84)	34 (93)	36 (97)	37 (99)	34 (93)	31 (88)	30 (86)	31 (88)	31 (88)	29 (84)	27 (81)	31 (88)
Mean daily minimum °C (°F)	14 (57)	18 (64)	22 (72)	26 (79)	28 (82)	28 (82)	26 (79)	26 (79)	25 (77)	22 (72)	18 (64)	14 (57)	22 (72)
Average rainfall mm (inches)	15.50 (0.61)	17.40 (0.69)	21.70 (0.85)	21.00 (0.83)	40.30 (1.59)	156.00 (6.14)	310.00 (12.20)	294.50 (11.59)	204.00 (8.03)	96.10 (3.78)	30.00 (1.18)	18.60 (0.73)	1,225.1 (48.22)
Source: MSM Weather

== Education ==
Educational institutions include:

- Bellaguntha Junior Science College
- Bellaguntha Women's College
- Sai Industrial Training Institute (ITI)
- G.T. High School, Estd: 1948
- Girls' High School
- Saraswati Sishu Bidya Bhawan
- Swami Vivekananda Sisu Bidya Mandir
- Swami Vivekananda Play School
- Smile Play School
- Saraswati Sisu Bidya Manadir
- Sri Arabinda Purnanga Sikhya Kendra
- Balidi U.P School
- Mala sahi Prathamika Bidyalaya
- Patel Road U.P School
- Bhagabata Patana UP School
- Rangani Patana Prathamika Bidyalaya
- M.E School
- Takshila English Medium School
- Odisha Public School
- Kautilya Smart Learning School (English Medium Smart School)
