= Chhatrapur =

- Town
- Location in Odisha, India Chhatrapur (India)
- Coordinates: 19.35°N 84.98°E
- Country: India
- State: Odisha
- District: Ganjam
- Established: 1794

Government
  - Type: Municipality
  - Body: Chhatrapur Municipal Council

Area
  - Total: 4.44 km^{2} (1.71 sq mi)
  - Rank: 2nd
- Elevation: 17 m (56 ft)

Population (2011)
  - Total: 22,027
  - Rank: 100
  - Density: 4,960/km^{2} (12,800/sq mi)

Languages
  - Official: Odia
- Time zone: UTC+5:30 (IST)
- PIN: 761020
- Telephone code: 06811
- Vehicle registration: OD-07
- Website: www.chatrapurnac.in

Chhatrapur is a town and a Municipality in Ganjam district in the state of Odisha, India.

== About ==
Chhatrapur houses the district headquarter of Ganjam district, Ganjam Police and RTO. Headquarters of Chhatrapur Sub-divion, Ganjam Police District, Tehsil, Block (CD), Education block is also situated here.

== History ==
The Ganjam area was a part of the ancient Kalinga empire which was occupied by King Ashoka in 261 B.C During this period it was the main route of South and East for shipping. Its huge number of black elephants attracted king Ashok to invading Kalinga.

The district was named after the old township and European fort of Ganjam situated on the northern bank of river Rushikulya, which was the headquarter of the district. In 1757 it was French Commander Bussy, who marched into Ganjam and realized areas of tribute from feudal chiefs. It was the English who ultimately defeated the French in the Deccan and annexed Ganjam in 1759.

The modern Ganjam carved out of the Vizag district of Madras Presidency and came into existence on 31 March 1936. Ganjam district separated from Madras Presidency and formed a part of the newly created Orissa Province with effect from 1 April 1936. The re-organized district comprises the whole of Ghumusar, Chhatrapur and Baliguda divisions, Aska division, Athaghara division, part of old Berhampur taluk, part of old Ichhapur taluk, part of Parlakhemundi plains and the whole of Parlakhemundi agency area in the old Chicacola division.

In the year 1992, after the reorganization of districts by the Government of Odisha, the former Ganjam district bifurcated into 2 districts. The 7 blocks of the Paralakhemundi subdivision were separated to form a new district called Gajapati. While Ganjam district left with remaining 3 subdivisions, 22 blocks, and 18 urban areas. Chhatrapur remained the district headquarter for Ganjam district.

== Demographics ==
As of 2011 India census, Chhatrapur town had a population of 22,027 (Second biggest city in the district of Ganjam after Brahmapur). Males constitute 51% of the population and females 49%. Chhatrapur has an average literacy rate of 89%, higher than the national average of 59.5%; with male literacy of 85% and female literacy of 73%. 10% of the population is under 6 years of age.

Religion in Chhatrapur
Hinduism	97.31%
Islam	1.78%
Christianity	0.72%
Sikh	0.04%
Buddhist	0.00%
Jain	0.05%
Not Stated	0.10%
Other	0.00%

According to 2011 Census information the sub-district code of Chhatrapur block is 03085. Total area of Chhatrapur block is 124 km^{2} (48 sq mi) including 119.92 km^{2} (46.30 sq mi) rural area and 4.40 km^{2} (1.70 sq mi) urban area. Chhatrapur as a block has a population of 94,683 people with 20,415 houses in its 46 villages.

== Transport ==
Chhatrapur is the administrative capital of Ganjam and gateway to south Odisha, and has a well-developed transportation network. All express trains of Indian railway have a halt here. It is well connected with the Howrah madras highway so all luxury busses also passing through.

=== Road ===
Chhatrapur city is connected with National Highways NH-16 (Chennai – Kolkata)and State Highway 36 (Odisha) (Surada to Chhatrapur via Hinjilicut) with other cities and towns of Odisha. The three-wheeler auto taxis are the most important mode of transportation in this city. Taxis also ply on the city's roads. The Ganjam Urban Transport Services Limited (GUTSL) with joint partnership with Odisha State Road Transport Corporation (OSRTC) have come up with an agreement, valid for one year, to run a city-bus service for Berhampur to Chhatrapur and urban centres on its periphery (Gopalpur, and Hinjli) on 27 February 2014.

=== Rail ===
Chatrapur railway station is situated on the East coast railway line with code CAP. Which is a major route connecting the two metros Kolkata and Chennai of India. It is directly connected to New Delhi, Ahmadabad, Bangalore, Bhubaneswar, Berhampur, Chennai, Cuttack, Mumbai, Nagpur, Pune, Puri, Surat, Tirupati, Vishakhapatnam, Hyderabad, Kolkata, Raipur, Rourkela, Sambalpur and many more cities of India.

There are two railway stations in Chhatrapur; they are Chhatrapur Station CAP and Chhatrapur Court Station which is a Passenger Halt.

== Climate and regional setting ==
The maximum summer temperature is 37 °C; the minimum winter temperature is 16 °C. The mean daily temperature varies from 33 °C to 38 °C. May is the hottest month; December is the coldest. The average annual rainfall is 1250 mm and the region receives monsoon and torrential rainfall from July to October.

Climate data for Chhatrapur, Odisha
Month	Jan	Feb	Mar	Apr	May	Jun	Jul	Aug	Sep	Oct	Nov	Dec	Year
Mean daily maximum °C (°F)	27 (81)	30 (86)	34 (93)	36 (97)	37 (99)	34 (93)	32 (90)	31 (88)	32 (90)	32 (90)	30 (86)	28 (82)	32 (90)
Mean daily minimum °C (°F)	16 (61)	19 (66)	23 (73)	27 (81)	29 (84)	28 (82)	27 (81)	27 (81)	26 (79)	23 (73)	20 (68)	16 (61)	23 (74)
Average rainfall cm (inches)	1.2 (0.5)	1.70 (0.67)	1.90 (0.75)	1.50 (0.59)	4.00 (1.57)	15.00 (5.91)	28.20 (11.10)	27.30 (10.75)	18.00 (7.09)	9.30 (3.66)	3.30 (1.30)	1.90 (0.75)	113.3 (44.64)
Source: MSM Weather

== Politics ==
In 2024 Member of the Legislative Assembly (MLA) from Chhatrapur Assembly Constituency is Krushna Chandra Nayak of Bhartiya Janata Party(BJP) who won the seat in State elections of 2024. Previous MLA s from this seat include Subash Chandra Behera of Biju Janata Dal (BJD), who won the seat in State elections of 2019. Dr Priyanshu Pradhan of BJD who won this seat in 2014, Narayan Reddy of CPI who won this seat in 2004 Rama Chandra Panda of Bharatiya Janata Party (BJP)who won this seat in 2000, Daitari Behera of Indian National Congress (INC) in 1995, Parsuram Panda of CPI in 1990, Ashok Kumar Choudhury of INC in 1985, and Biswanath Sahu of CPI in 1980 and in 1977.

Chhatrapur is part of Berhampur (Lok Sabha constituency).
