= Ganjam district =

- District of Odisha
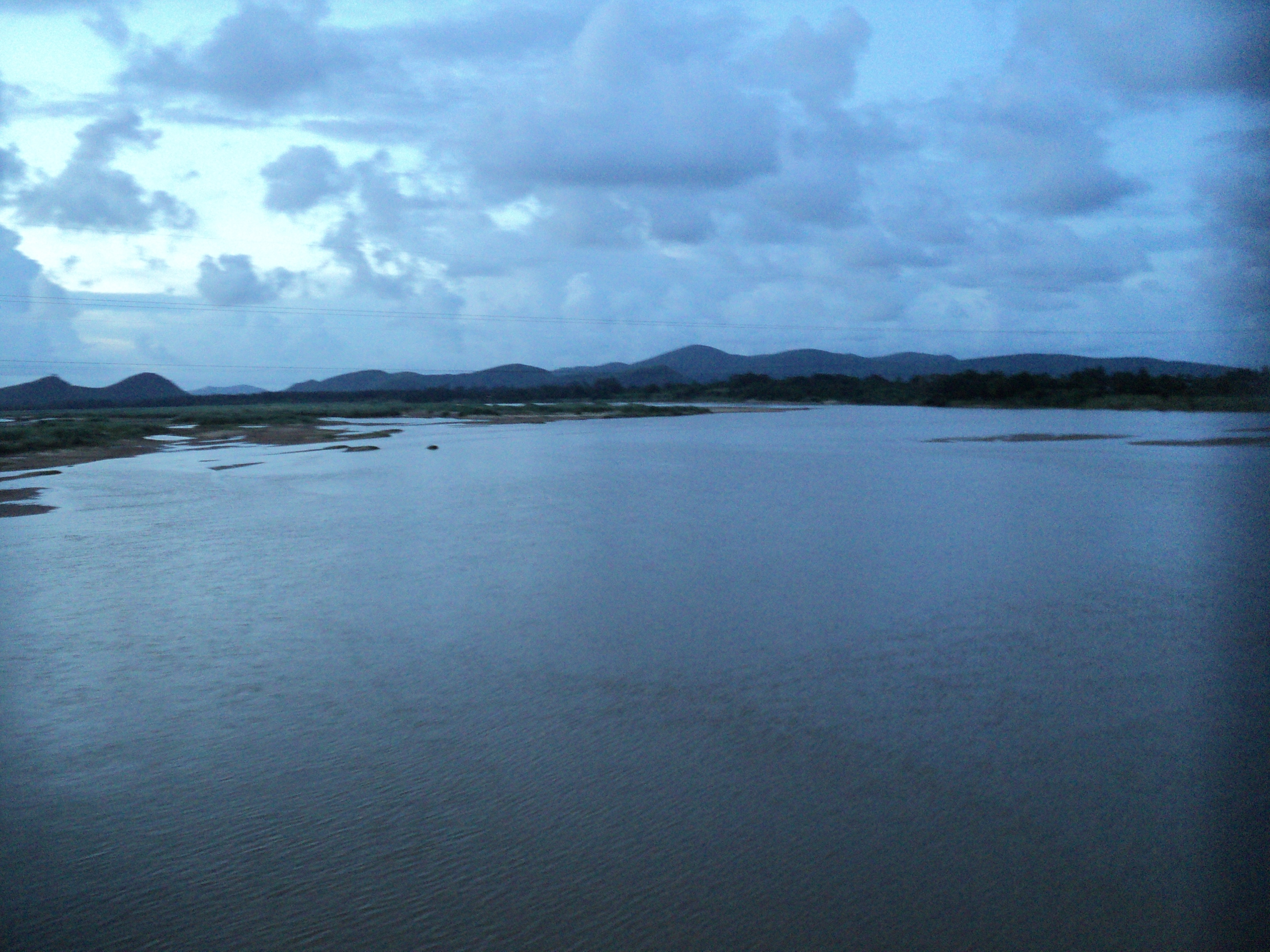
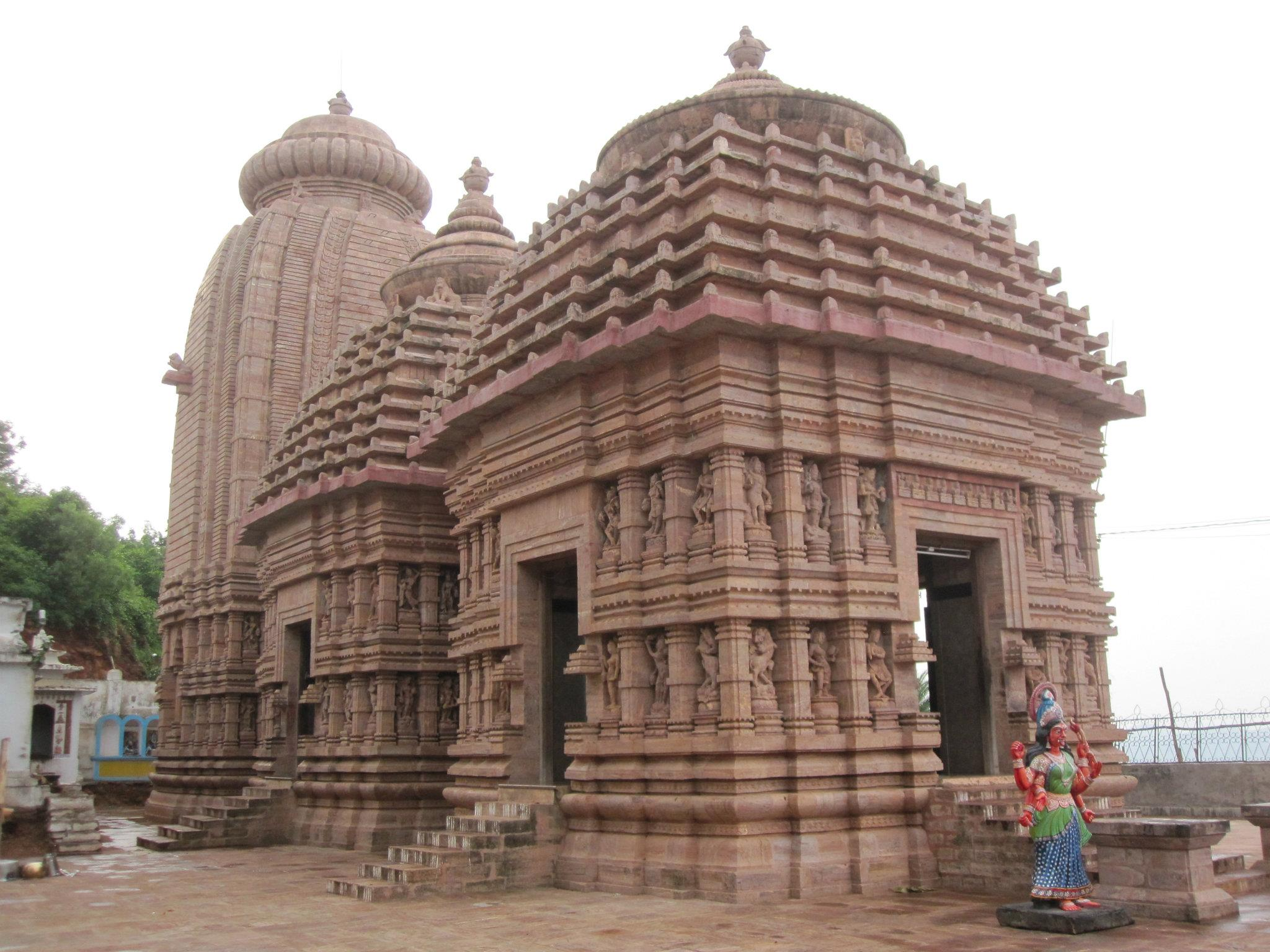
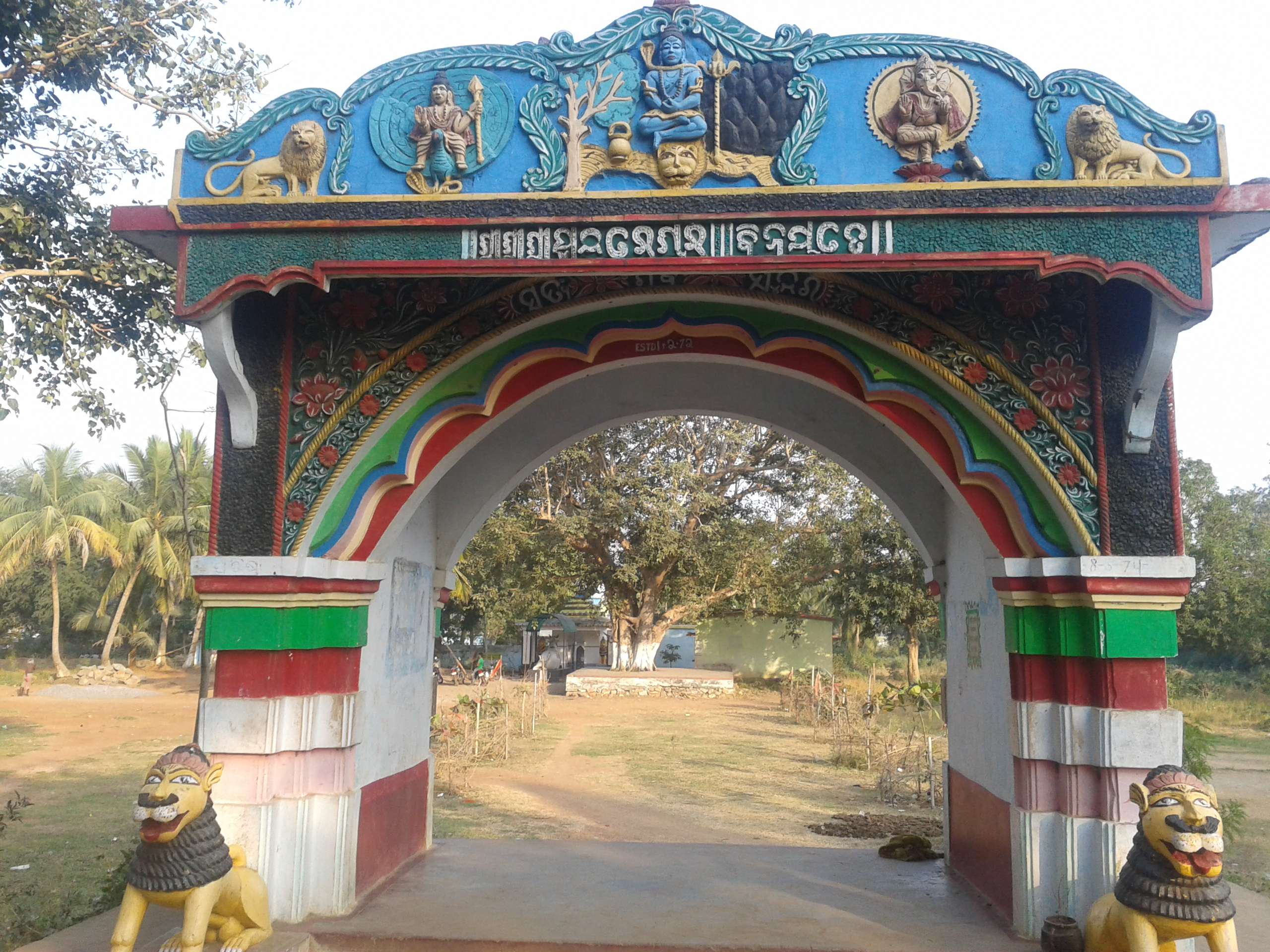
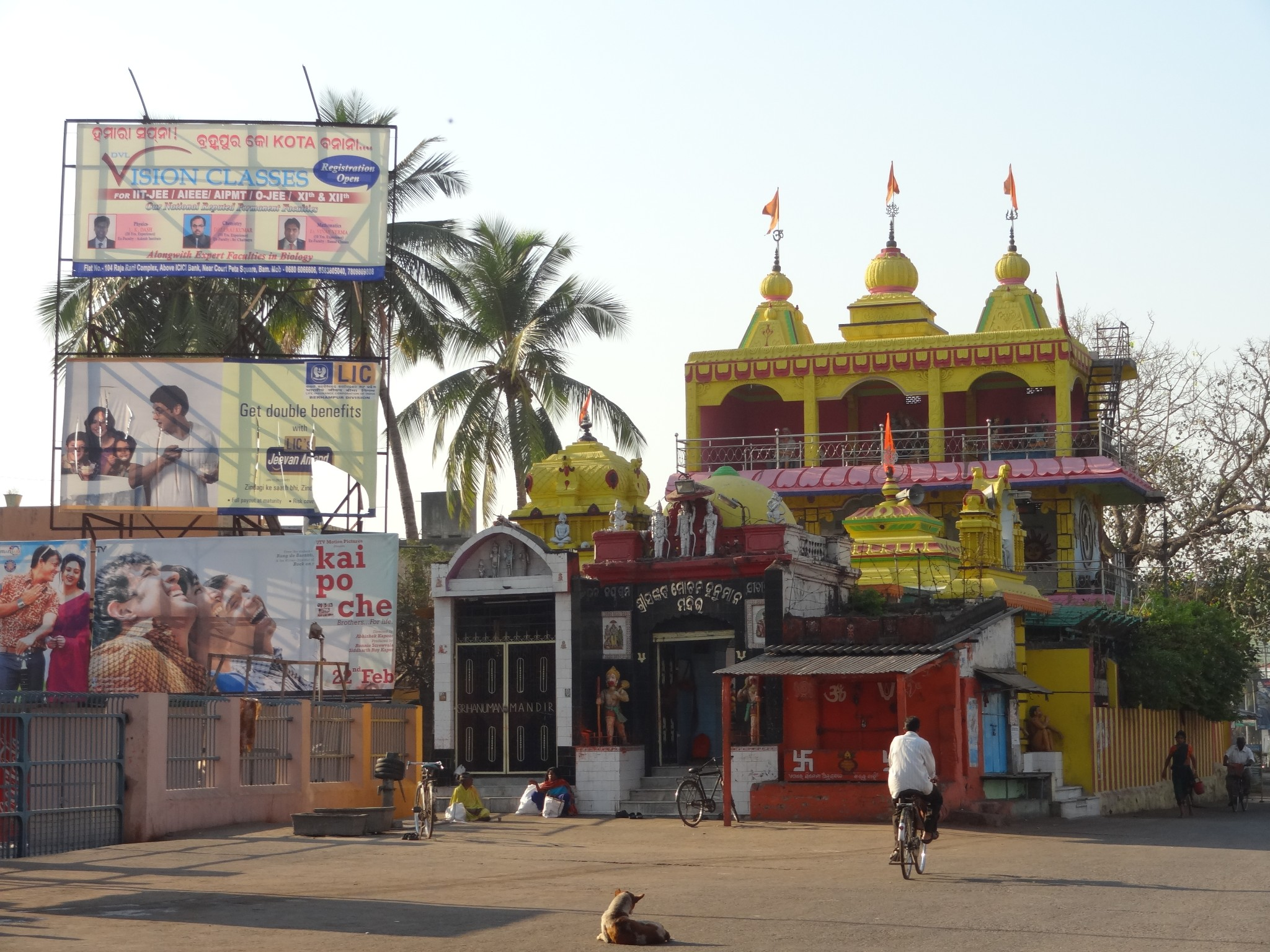
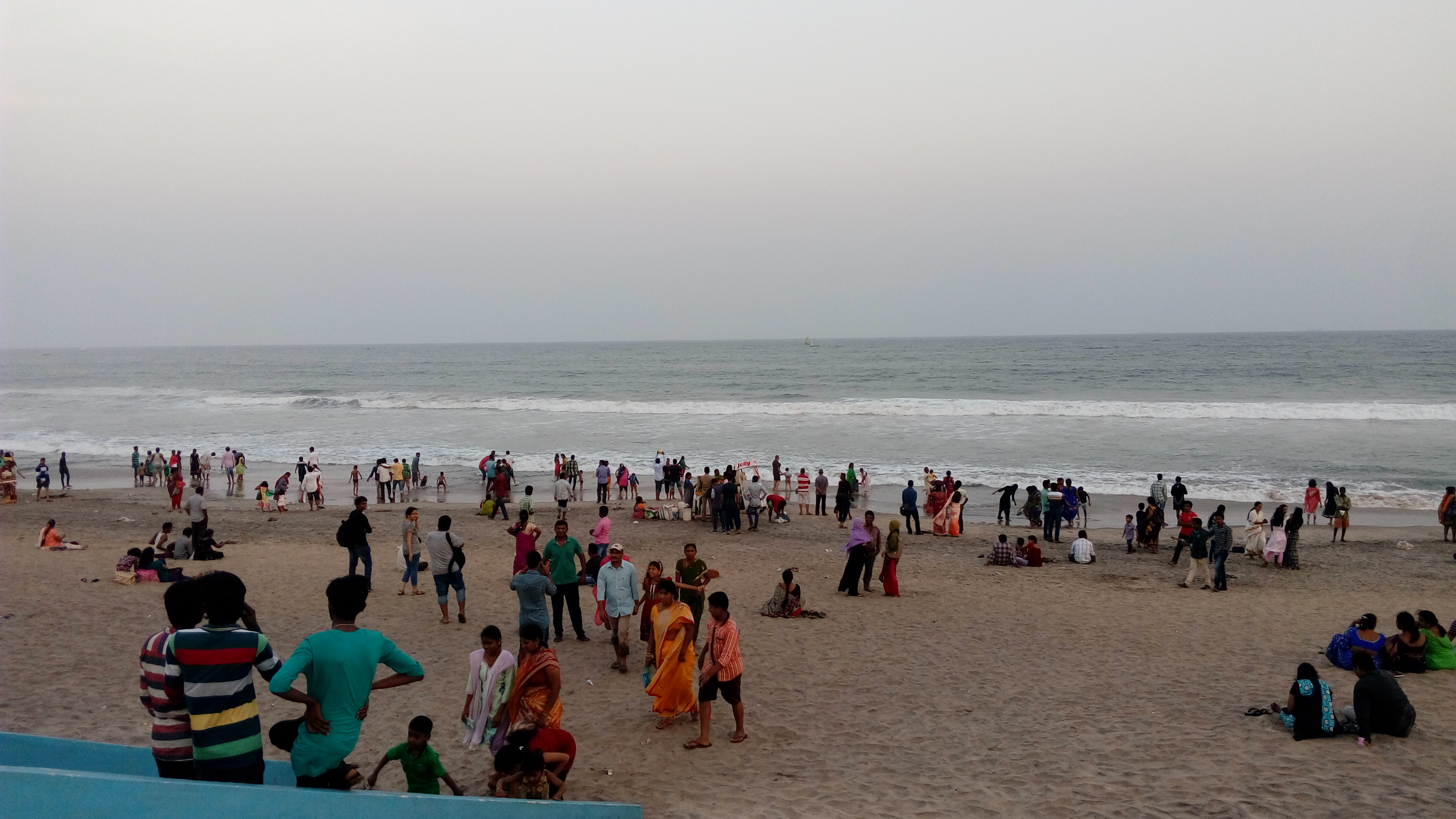
- Clockwise from top-left: Rushikulya River, Taratarini Temple, Street in Brahmapur, Beach at Gopalpur, Sundareshwar Temple in Sunathar
- Interactive map of Ganjam district
- Coordinates: 19.383°N 85.05°E
- Country: India
- State: Odisha
- Established: March 31, 1936; 90 years ago
- Headquarters: Chhatrapur

Government
  - Collector & District Magistrate: Keerthi Vasan V

Area
  - Total: 8,206 km^{2} (3,168 sq mi)

Population (2011)
  - Total: 3,529,031
  - Density: 430.1/km^{2} (1,114/sq mi)
- Demonym: Ganjami

Languages
  - Official: Odia
- Time zone: UTC+5:30 (IST)
- PIN: 761 xxx / 760 xxx
- Vehicle registration: OD-07(for Ganjam); OD-32 (for Bhanjanagar)
- Nearest city: Brahmapur
- Sex ratio: 0.981 ♂/♀
- Literacy: 83.86%
- Precipitation: 1,295.6 millimetres (51.01 in)
- Lok Sabha constituency: Berhampur; Aska; Kandhamal (part)
- Vidhan Sabha constituency: 13: 123-Bhanjanagar 124-Polasara 125-Kabisuryanagar 126-Khallikote(SC) 127-Chhatrapur(SC) 128-Aska 129-Surada 130-Sanakhemundi 131-Hinjili 132-Gopalpur 133-Berhampur 134-Digapahandi 135-Chikiti
- Website: ganjam.odisha.gov.in

Ganjam district is a district in the Indian state of Odisha. Ganjam's total area is 8,206 km² (3,168 mi²). The district headquarters is Chhatrapur. Ganjam is divided into three sub-divisions: Chhatrapur, Brahmapur, and Bhanjanagar. As of 2011, it is the most populous district of Odisha (out of 30) and is 2nd most largest district by area in Odisha.

== History ==
Ganjam was a part of ancient Dakshina Kalinga. The Mauryan emperor Ashoka inscribed his message at Jaugada near the banks of the Rushikulya, in the present-day Ganjam district. Scholars thus conclude that a significant part of Ganjam was under the rule of Ashoka. There are multiple theories regarding the name 'Ganjam'. During the 7th century, the region was known as Kangoda or Kongoda. Some scholars believe the word evolved from this ancient name while others suggest the name of the region likely derives from the Persian word "Ganj", meaning 'granary' or 'market' thus signifying the importance of historical ports and being the respective center of trade and commerce.

Ganjam district is one of the oldest administrative units of Odisha. It was part of Madras presidency during British rule.

== Administrative setup ==
The 23 Tahasils in Ganjam district under three sub-divisions are listed in the following table.

23 Tahasils
#	Chhatrapur Sub-Division	Brahmapur Sub-Division	Bhanjanagar Sub-Division
1	Chhatrapur	Brahmapur	Bhanjanagar
2	Ganjam	Konisi	Asika
3	Khallikote	Kukudakhandi	Sheragada
4	Purushottampur	Patrapur	Dharakot
5	Hinjilikatu	Chikiti	Sorada
6	Kabisuryanagar	Digapahandi	Belaguntha
7	Polasara	Sanakhemundi	Jagannath Prasad
8	Kodala		Buguda

The 22 Blocks in Ganjam district under three sub-divisions are listed in the following table.

22 Blocks
#	Chhatrapur Sub-Division	Brahmapur Sub-Division	Bhanjanagar Sub-Division
1	Chhatrapur	Rangeilunda	Bhanjanagar
2	Ganjam	Kukudakhandi	Asika
3	Khallikote	Patrapur	Sheragada
4	Purushottampur	Chikiti	Dharakot
5	Hinjilikatu	Digapahandi	Sorada
6	Kabisuryanagar	Sanakhemundi	Belaguntha
7	Polasara		Jagannath Prasad
8	Beguniapada		Buguda

There are 39 police stations under the two Police Districts in Ganjam Administrative district. They are listed in the following table.

39 Police Stations
	Ganjam Police District	Berhampur Police District
1	Chhatrapur P.S.	Berhampur Town P.S., Berhampur
2	Chamakhandi P.S.	Baidyanathpur P.S., Berhampur
3	Ganjam P.S.	Bada Bazar P.S., Berhampur
4	Rambha P.S.	Gosaninuagaon P.S., Berhampur
5	Khallikote P.S.	Mahila P.S., Berhampur
6	Marine P.S., Arjyapalli	Sadar P.S., Berhampur
7	Energy P.S., Chhatrapur	Gopalpur P.S.
8	Purushottampur P.S.	Golanthara P.S.
9	Kabisuryanagar P.S.	K. Nuagaon P.S.
10	Kodala P.S.	Jarada P.S.
11	Polasara P.S.	Digapahandi P.S.
12	Asika P.S.	Energy P.S., Berhampur
13	Hinjili P.S.	Cyber P.S., Berhampur
14	Pattapur P.S.	Traffic P.S., Berhampur
15	Sorada P.S.	Beguniapada P.S
16	Badagada P.S.	
17	Sheragada P.S.	
18	Dharakot P.S.	
19	Bhanjanagar P.S.	
20	Gangapur P.S.	
21	Buguda P.S.	
22	Jagannath Prasad P.S.	
23	Tarasingi P.S.	
24	Bellaguntha P.S.	
25	Energy P.S., Bhanjanagar	
26	Kotinada Police Station, Kotinada(Asika)	

The Urban Local Bodies are

• Municipal Corporation: Brahmapur

• Municipality : Hinjilikatu, Asika, Chhatrapur, Bhanjanagar, Polasara, Kabisuryanagar

• Notified Area Council's : Sorada, Belaguntha, Buguda, Gopalpur, Ganjam, Rambha, Khallikot, Purusottampur, Kodala, Digapahandi, Chikiti, Sheragada, Kukudakhandi, Jagannath Prasad, Patrapur etc.

•Small Urban Area's: Dharakot, Patapur Sanakhemundi, B.D.Pur, Badagada, Sheragada, Balipadar, Babanpur, Mundamarai, Humma.

== Economy ==
An important contributor to the local economy is production of extracts from Ganjam Kewda Rooh, which are used in perfumery.

Since Ganjam is a coastal district, it is well equipped with Port facilities. Port at Gopalpur and nearby industries cater economic activities of the district and Odisha state.

== Demographics ==
Historical population
Year	Pop.	±%
1901	957,123	—
1911	1,064,172	+11.2%
1921	1,029,623	−3.2%
1931	1,165,908	+13.2%
1941	1,308,056	+12.2%
1951	1,361,831	+4.1%
1961	1,587,461	+16.6%
1971	1,944,844	+22.5%
1981	2,267,628	+16.6%
1991	2,704,056	+19.2%
2001	3,160,635	+16.9%
2011	3,529,031	+11.7%
Source: Census of India

Religions in Ganjam district (2011)
Religion	Percent
Hinduism	98.78%
Christianity	0.68%
Other or not stated	0.54%

According to the 2011 census Ganjam district has a population of 3,529,031, roughly equal to the nation of Lithuania or the US state of Connecticut. This gives it a ranking of 83rd in India (out of a total of 640). The district has a population density of 430 inhabitants per square kilometre (1,100/sq mi). Its population growth rate over the decade 2001–2011 was 11.37%. Ganjam has a sex ratio of 983 females for every 1000 males, and a literacy rate of 71.88%. 21.76% of the population lives in urban areas. The Imperial Gazetteer of India 1908 lists Ganjam, along with the Thanjavur and South Canara districts, as the three districts of the Madras Presidency where Brahmins were most numerous. As per the 2011 Census, Scheduled Castes and Scheduled Tribes make up 19.50% and 3.37% of the population respectively.

Languages of Ganjam district (2011)
1. Odia (91.3%)
2. Telugu (7.17%)
3. Others (1.54%)

At the time of the 2011 Census of India, 91.29% of the population in the district spoke Odia, 7.17% Telugu, 0.44% Kui and 0.42% Sora as their first language.

== Politics ==
=== Vidhan Sabha constituencies ===
The following are the Vidhan Sabha constituencies of Ganjam, with their elected members.

No.	Constituency	Reservation	Extent of the Assembly Constituency (Blocks)	Member of 16th Assembly	Party
123	Bhanjanagar	None	Bhanjanagar (NAC), Bhanjanagar, Jagannathprasad	Pradyumna Nayak	BJP
124	Polasara	None	Buguda (NAC), Polasara (NAC), Buguda, Polasara	Gokula Nanda Mallik	BJP
125	Kabisuryanagar	None	Kabisuryanagar (NAC), Kodala (NAC), Beguniapada, Kabisuryanagar (part), Purusottampur (part)	Pratap Chandra Nayak	BJP
126	Khalikote	SC	Khalikote (NAC), Purusottampur (NAC), Khalikote, Purusottampur (part)	Purna Chandra Sethi	BJP
127	Chhatrapur	SC	Chhatrapur (NAC), Ganjam (NAC), Rambha (NAC), Ganjam, Chhatrapur	Krushna Chandra Nayak	BJP
128	Aska	None	Aska (NAC), Aska, Kabisuryanagar (part)	Saroj Padhi	BJP
129	Surada	None	Surada (NAC), Bellaguntha (NAC), Surada, Bellaguntha,	Nilamani Bisoyi	BJP
130	Sanakhemundi	None	Sanakhemundi, Dharakote	Ramesh Chandra Jena	INC
131	Hinjili	None	Hinjilicut (Municipality), Hinjilicut, Hinjili Sheragada	Naveen Patnaik	BJD
132	Gopalpur	None	Gopalpur (NAC), Rangailunda, Kukudakhandi (part), Berhampur (M) (part)	Bibhuti Bhusan Jena	BJP
133	Berhampur	None	Berhampur (Municipal Corporation) (Part),	K. Anil Kumar	BJP
134	Digapahandi	None	Digapahandi (NAC), Digapahandi, Kukudakhandi (Part)	Sidhant Mohapatra	BJP
135	Chikiti	None	Chikiti (NAC), Chikiti Block, Patrapur Block	Manoranjan Dyan Samantara	BJP

=== Lok Sabha constituencies ===
Since 2008, Ganjam district is represented in Berhampur (Lok Sabha constituency) and Aska (Lok Sabha constituency).

Berhampur seat earlier Ganjam (Lok Sabha constituency) exist in 1952 and 1957 general elections as two seat constituency and Chatarpur (Lok Sabha constituency) exist in 1962, 1967 and 1971 general elections and later Berhanpur seat exist since 1977 general elections.

The Aska seat existed since the 1977 general elections and earlier as Bhanjanagar (Lok Sabha constituency) seat in 1962, 1967 and 1971 general elections.

== People from Ganjam district ==
- Kabi Samrat Upendra Bhanja, Great Poet
- Kabisurjya Baladeb Rath, Poet
- Bharat Ratna V.V. Giri, former President of India (4th)
- P. V. Narasimha Rao, former Prime Minister of India, elected as a member of parliament from Bramhapur constituency
- Kalinga Vira Biju Patnaik, former Chief Minister of Odisha and former Union Cabinet minister of India
- Naveen Patnaik: The longest & 14th Chief Minister of Odisha, is also MLA(Member of Legislative Assembly) from Hinjilicut, Ganjam District, Odisha
- Maharaja Krushna Chandra Gajapati, 1st Prime Minister of Odisha, regarded as architect of an Independent united Odisha State. He was a king of Eastern Ganga Dynasty (Paralakhemundi Branch of Gajapati district but previously it was a part of Ganjam District)
- Bishwanath Das, 2nd Prime Minister of Odisha former Governor of Uttar Pradesh and former Chief Minister of Odisha.
- Binayak Acharya, former Chief Minister of Odisha
- Rao Bahadur Sir Annepu Parasuramdas Patro, KCIE, zamindar, former education minister of Madras Presidency and participant in First Round Table Conference
- Padma Shri Kota Harinarayana, scientist, former Programme Director and Chief Designer of India's Light Combat Aircraft Tejas programme and former Vice chancellor of University of Hyderabad
- Padma Shri Sanjukta Panigrahi, Most famous Odissi dancer
- Padma Bhushan Waheeda Rehman, regarded as all time greatest actress of Indian cinema and dancer started her career at Ganjam Kala Parishad, Berhampur
- Siddhanta Mahapatra, most famous & successful actor and two times member of parliament from Bramhapur constituency
- Celina Jaitly, actress and model, studied at Khallikote Autonomous College (Now Khallikote University)
- Padma Shri Sisir Mishra, Hindi/Odia film director
- Pandit Tarini Charan Patra, Prominent Odissi musician, Guru, singer, scholar, poet, composer & Binākara (exponent of Odissi Bina)
- Pandit Ramarao patro, great Odissi musician, compose, Bina player, vocalist
- Lisa Mishra, singer
- Sulagna Panigrahi, actress
- K Ravi Kumar, won gold in weightlifting at 2010 Commonwealth Games and also participated in 2012 London Olympics
- Padma Shri P. V. S. Rao, Computer scientist
- Justice B. Jagannadha Das, former Chief Justice of Orissa High Court
- Justice Lingaraj Panigrahi, former Chief Justice of Orissa High Court and former Speaker of Odisha Legislative Assembly
- Somanath Rath, former Speaker of Odisha Legislative Assembly
- Biswanath Pattnaik was a legendary veteran Gandhian, Sarvodaya and Bhoodan leader
- Arun K. Pati, quantum physicist
- W. V. V. B. Ramalingam, mathematics teacher and freedom fighter
- Thapi Dharma Rao, journalist, writer
- Chandra Sekhar Sahu, member of parliament of Bramhapur constituency and former union Rural Development minister
- Ram Krushna Patnaik, Former cabinet Finance minister of Odisha and former Member of legislative of Odisha. He was one of the founding member of Biju Janata Dal (BJD)
- Smt. A. Laxmibai, first Woman Deputy Speaker of Odisha Legislative Assembly
- Sashi Bhusan Rath, Social reformer & Politician
- Raja Harihar Mardaraj, Former king of Khallikote and freedom fighter
- Nikhilanand panigrahy, writer
- Gopalakrusna Pattanayaka, poet & composer of Odissi music
- Padma Shri Krishna Mohan Pathi, orthopedic surgeon
- Harihar Panda, freedom fighter
- G. S. Melkote, freedom fighter and parliamentarian
- Goparaju Ramachandra Rao, Atheist, Freedom Fighter, Social Activist, Social Reformer
- Raja Bahadur Ramachandra Mardaraj Deo, king and freedom fighter
- Sanskaraka Shribastha panda, freedom fighter
- Laxmi Narayan Pattnaik, freedom fighter
- Chakara Bisoyi, freedom fighter
- Padma shri Bhagaban Sahu, folk dancer and choreographer
- Soubhagya Kumar Misra, Sahitya Akademi Award winner for his writing
- Gouri Kumar Brahma, Academician, literary critic, orator and writer
- Dr. Dinanath Pathy, Indian painter, author and art historian
