= Brahmapur =

Brahmapur may refer to the following places:

- Brahmaloka, heavenly abode of the Hindu god Brahma
- Brahmpur, Bihar, village in Bihar, India
- Brahampur, Nepal, municipality ward in Dakneshwori, Nepal
- Brahmapur, Odisha, city in Odisha, India
  - Brahmapur railway station
- Brahampur, Phagwara, village in Punjab, India

== See also ==
- Brahmapuri (disambiguation)
