= Nala dynasty =

Indian dynasty

Nalas of Pushkari
- 6th century–6th century
- Location of the Nalas and neighbouring South Asian polities circa 500 CE.
- Status: Kingdom
- Capital: Pushkari (modern day Garhdhanora in Bastar district)
- Religion: Hinduism
- Government: Monarchy
- History
  - Established: 6th century
  - Disestablished: 6th century
Preceded by
| Gupta Empire |
Succeeded by
| Panduvamshis of Dakshina Kosala |
| Sharabhapuriya dynasty |
| Chalukya dynasty |
- Today part of: India

The Nalas were an Indian dynasty that ruled parts of present-day Chhattisgarh and Odisha during the 6th century CE. Their core territory included the areas around Bastar and Koraput districts. Their capital was probably Pushkari (IAST: Puṣkarī), identified with the modern Garhdhanora in Bastar district. At one point, they seem to have conquered the Vakataka capital Nandivardhana in the Vidarbha region, but suffered reverses against the Vakatakas as well as the Chalukyas. Sharabhapuriyas, their northern neighbours, also seem to have played a part in their downfall. They were probably supplanted by the Panduvamshi dynasty, although one branch of the dynasty seems to have ruled a small territory until the 7th or 8th century CE.

== History ==
Inscriptions of three kings mention them as members of the Nala family: Arthapati, Bhavadatta and Skandavarman. Some gold coins suggest the existence of three other Nala rulers – Varaharaja, Nandanaraja, and Stambha. Although these coins do not mention the name of their dynasty, they bear the bull-and-crescent dynastic emblem of the Nala kings, and weigh same as the known Nala coins. Also, the name of the issuer is written in "box-headed" script of 6th century on all the coins, and they have all been discovered in the former Nala territory. The coins of Varaharaja have been discovered along with those of Arthapati and Bhavadatta. All these evidences indicate that Varaharaja, Nandanaraja and Stambha were all Nala kings too.

=== Varaharaja ===
Palaeographic evidence suggests that Varaharaja was the earliest of these kings, although it is not certain if he was the dynasty's founder. His issuance of gold coins suggests that he enjoyed a sovereign status.

=== Arthapati ===
Arthapati is known from a copper-plate inscription and coins. His only known inscription was issued from Pushkari, which may have been the capital of the Nala kings. The inscription suggests that the king was a devotee of Maheshvara (Shiva) and Mahasena (Kartikeya). The inscription mentions that he was from the family of Nala. According to one theory, this is a reference to the legendary king Nala of Nishadha Kingdom. However, there is no concrete proof for this interpretation.

=== Bhavadatta ===
Find spots of the Nala inscriptions

The next known king of the dynasty is Bhavadatta, whose copper-plate inscription was found at Rithpur (also Rithapur or Ridhapur) in Amravati district, Maharashtra. The inscription was engraved by one Boppadeva. It mentions the king's name as "Bhavattavarman", which is probably a mistake or a Prakrit form of the Sanskrit name "Bhavadattavarman". It names Arthapati as the king's aryaka, which is variously interpreted to mean "father" or "grandfather"; according to another interpretation, aryaka is an epithet of Bhavadatta. The inscription names the place of issue as Nandivardhana, and states that the king and the queen were staying at Prayaga as pilgrims. Like Arthapati's inscription, it mentions Maheshvara, Mahasena and the Nala family.

The find spot of Bhavadatta's inscription suggests that he extended the Nala territory to the present-day Vidarbha region, possibly at the expense of the Vakatakas (whose capital was at Nandivardhana).

During his last years, Bhavadatta seems to have suffered reverses against the Vakatakas and the Chalukyas. An inscription of Bhavadatta's successor Skandavarman indicates that Bhavadatta lost the control of Pushkari, possibly to the Vakatakas or the Chalukyas. The Vakataka king Prithivisena II is said to have restored the glory of his family, apparently by defeating the Nalas. An Aihole inscription credits the Chalukya king Kirtivarman I with the destruction of the Nalas.

=== Skandavarman ===
The last known king of the dynasty is Skandavarman, whose Podagada inscription mentions him as a son of Bhavadattavarman. The inscription states that Skandavarman retrieved the lost glory of the Nala family, and re-populated the deserted city of Pushkari. It also records the construction of a Vishnu shrine by the king.

V. V. Mirashi identifies the Rajarsitulyakula king Bhimasena II as an enemy of Skandavarman. Skandavarman perhaps occupied Bhimasena's territory circa 500 A.D.

== Possible successors ==
Nothing is known about the immediate successors of Skandavarman. But the Nalas were probably supplanted by the Panduvamshi dynasty. The Sharabhapuriya dynasty may have also contributed to the decline of the Nalas. The coins of the Sharabhapuriyas are similar to that of the Nalas, which suggests that the two dynasties were contemporaries. Epigraphic and numismatic evidence indicates that the Sharabhapuriyas were the northern neighbours of the Nalas.

A dynasty claiming descent from the legendary Nala is known to have ruled a small area in present-day Chhattisgarh sometime later. The undated Rajim inscription of this dynasty can be assigned to either 7th or 8th century CE. This dynasty was probably a branch of the Nalas of Bastar. Its known members include Prithviraja, Viruparaja and Vilasatunga.

== Capital ==
The dynasty's capital was probably Pushkari, which is mentioned as the place of issue in an inscription of Arthapati. Earlier, Pushkari was believed to be the present-day Podagada in Koraput district, where an inscription of Skandavarman has been found. Later research has led to the identification of Garhdhanora in Bastar district as Pushkari. The excavations carried out by Madhya Pradesh's Directorate of Archaeology and Museums has resulted in discovery of several ruined temples and sculptures at Garhdhanora.

== Religion ==
The Brahmanical system thrived during the rule of the Nala kings, who patronized Shaivism, Vaishnavism, and Shaktism.

== Inscriptions ==
The following inscriptions of the Nala kings have been discovered:

| Find spot | Issued by | Issued from | Regnal year | Purpose | Source |
|---|---|---|---|---|---|
| Kesarabera | Arthapati | Pushkari | 7 | Grant of Keselaka (or Kesalaka) village to the Brahmanas of Kautsa gotra. The village was earlier identified with Kesarabera (or Kesaribeda), but is now identified with Keskal | |
| Ridhapur (or Rithpur), Amravati district | Bhavadattavarman | Nandivardhana | 11 | Grant of Kadambagiri village to a Brahmana of Parashara gotra and his 8 sons. | |
| Podagada (Podagadh) | Skandavarman | | 12 | Construction of a Vishnu temple | |
| Rajim | Vilasatunga | | Undated (c. 7th century CE) | Construction of a Vishnu temple (Rajivalocahana temple) | |

== List of rulers ==
The following rulers of the dynasty are known from their coins and inscriptions:

- Varaha-raja (coins)
- Arthapati-Bhattaraka (coins and inscriptions)
- Bhavadatta-varman (coins and inscriptions)
- Skanda-varman (inscriptions)

Two other rulers are known from coins, but they cannot be placed in chronology based on the available information.

- Stambha
- Nandana-raja

== Descendants ==
The descendants of the Nala dynasty later established the Khidisingi mandala in modern Ganjam region around 9th-10th century CE which eventually became the ancestors of the Soroda dynasty. The Khidisingi estate further split into 4 separate zamindaris consisting of Badagada, Dharakote, Soroda and Sheragada.
