= Sanakhemundi Assembly constituency =

Constituency of the Odisha legislative assembly in India

Coordinates: 19.44°N 84.58°E

Sanakhemundi
- Constituency No. 130 for the Odisha Legislative Assembly
- Sanakhemundi Assembly constituency in Ganjam district

Constituency details
- Country: India
- Region: East India
- State: Odisha
- Division: Southern Division
- District: Ganjam
- Lok Sabha constituency: Aska
- Established: 2009
- Total electors: 2,31,373 (Note: as on 2024) (Note: as data published by election commission)
- Reservation: None

Member of Legislative Assembly
- 17th Odisha Legislative Assembly
- Incumbent Ramesh Chandra Jena
- Party: Independent
- Elected year: 2024

Sanakhemundi is a constituency for the Legislative Assembly of Odisha (Vidhan Sabha) in Ganjam district, Odisha, India.

This constituency includes Sanakhemundi and Dharakote blocks.

The constituency was formed in 2008 Delimitation and went for polls in 2009 election.

== Elected members ==
Vote share of winning candidates
2024	44.65%
2019	50.74%
2014	47.10%
2009	50.35%

Since its formation in 2009, 4 elections were held till date.

Elected members from the Sanakhemundi constituency are:

Year	Member	Party
2024	Ramesh Chandra Jena	Indian National Congress
2019	Ramesh Chandra Jena	Indian National Congress
2014	Nandini Devi	Biju Janata Dal
2009	Ramesh Chandra Jena	Indian National Congress

== Election results ==
=== 2024 ===
Voting were held on 20 May 2024 in 2nd phase of Odisha Assembly Election & 5th phase of Indian General Election. Counting of votes was on 4 June 2024. In 2024 election, Independent candidate Ramesh Chandra Jena defeated Biju Janata Dal candidate Sulakhyana Geetanjali Debi by a margin of 10,622 votes.

2024 Odisha Vidhan Sabha Election, Sanakhemundi
Party	Candidate	Votes	%	±%
INC	Ramesh Chandra Jena	65,867	44.65	▼6.09
BJD	Sulakshana Gitanjali Devi	55,205	37.42	▲2.73
BJP	Uttam Kumar Panigrahi	22,396	15.18	▲4.81
NOTA	None of the above	2,724	1.85	
Majority		10,662		
Turnout		147,529		
INC hold				

=== 2019 ===
In 2019 election, Indian National Congress candidate Ramesh Chandra Jena defeated Biju Janata Dal candidate Nandini Devi by a margin of 23,727 votes.

2019 Odisha Legislative Assembly election: Sanakhemundi
Party	Candidate	Votes	%	±%
INC	Ramesh Chandra Jena	75,021	50.74	
BJD	Nandini Devi	51,294	34.69	
BJP	Bijaya Kumar Swain	15,335	10.37	
NOTA	None of the above	2765	1.87	
Majority		23,727	16.05	
Turnout		147845	68.35	
INC gain from BJD				

=== 2014 ===
In 2014 election, Biju Janata Dal candidate Nandini Devi defeated Indian National Congress candidate Ramesh Chandra Jena by a margin of 8,222 votes.

2014 Odisha Legislative Assembly election: Sanakhemundi
Party	Candidate	Votes	%	±%
BJD	Nandini Devi	61,773	47.1	−
INC	Ramesh Chandra Jena	53,551	40.83	▼9.52
BJP	Birkishore Dev	6,053	4.61	▼22.21
NOTA	None of the above	2,275	1.73	−
Majority		8,222	6.27	−
Turnout		1,31,164	66.84	10.96
Registered electors		1,96,248		
BJD gain from INC				

=== 2009 ===
In 2009 election, Indian National Congress candidate Ramesh Chandra Jena defeated Bharatiya Janata Party candidate Kishore Chandra Singh Deo by a margin of 23,593 votes.

2009 Odisha Legislative Assembly election: Sanakhemundi
Party	Candidate	Votes	%	±%
INC	Ramesh Chandra Jena	50,487	50.35	−
BJP	Kishore Chandra Singh Deo	26,894	26.82	−
CPI	N. Narayan Reddy	15,023	14.98	−
Majority		23,593	23.53	−
Turnout		1,00,278	55.88	−
INC win (new seat)				
