= Rushikulya River =

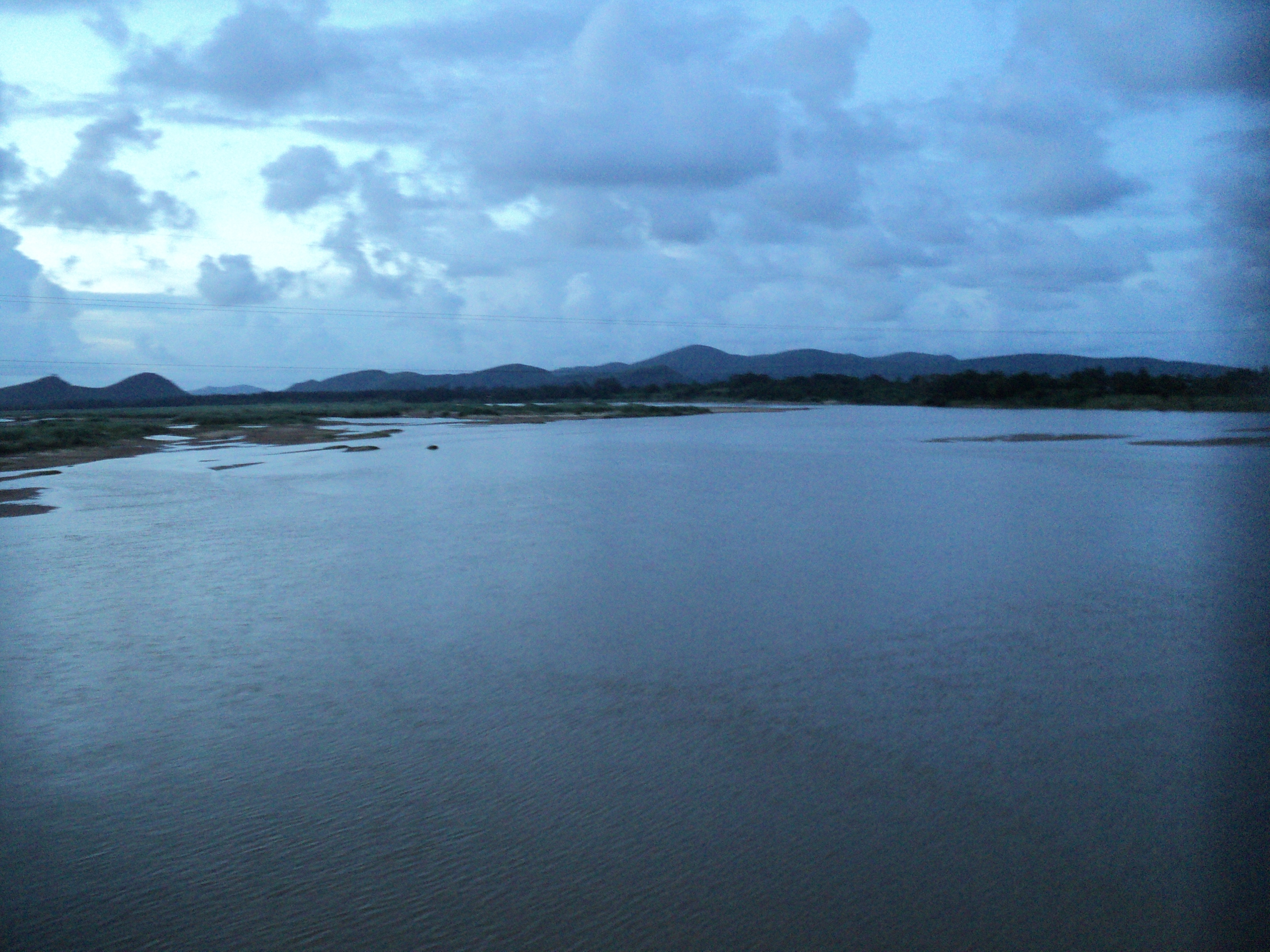
- The Rushikulya River
- Etymology: From Odia
- Native name: ଋଷିକୁଲ୍ୟା ନଦୀ (Odia)

Location
- Country: India
- Parts: Odisha
- Administrative areas: Kandhamal, Ganjam

Physical characteristics
- Source
  - location: Daringbadi, Kandhamal, Odisha, India
  - coordinates: 19.07°N 84.01°E
- Mouth: Puruna Bandha, bay of Bengal
  - location: Chhatrapur, Ganjam, Odisha, India
  - elevation: 0 m (0 ft)
- Length: 165 km (103 mi)

Basin features
- Tributaries
  - left: Baghua, Dhanei, Badanadi
  - right: Ghodahada

The Rushikulya River is one of the major rivers in Odisha and covers the entire catchment area in the districts of Kandhamal and Ganjam of Odisha. The Rushikulya originates about 1000 metres from the Rushimala Hills part of the Daringbadi hills of the Eastern Ghats range. Daringbadi, where the river originates, is called the ' Kashmir of Odisha '. The river lies within the geographical coordinates of 19.07 to 20.19 north latitude and 84.01 to 85.06 east longitude. It meets the Bay of Bengal at Puruna Bandha in Ganjam. Its tributaries are the Baghua, the Dhanei, the Badanadi, etc. It has no delta as such at its mouth.

== River course ==
The river flows from the Daringbadi hill station in the Kandhamal district. In the Ganjam district, it flows through Surada, Dharakote, Asika, Pitala, Purusottampur, Taratarini, Pratappur, Alladigam, Brahmapur, Ganjam, and the Chhatrapur block. The river is 165 km long and has a total catchment area of 7700 km^{2}. The mean monthly flow rate is estimated to be 89.64 cumecs during the 1992-93 period under the Daily rainfall-runoff modelling of Rushikulya river, Orissa.

== Survey for olive ridley turtles ==
In 1993, biologists from the Odisha Forest Department and the Wildlife Institute of India learned that large-scale nesting of olive ridley sea turtles took place near the mouth of the Rushikulya River. This area is the location of one of the largest mass nesting (arribada) sites of olive ridley sea turtles in India. The villages near the mouth are Pali Bandha, Puruna Bandha, Gokhara Kuda, and Kantia Pada, where one can find the nesting sites of the olive ridley turtles. These are fishermen's villages.

== Urban centres ==
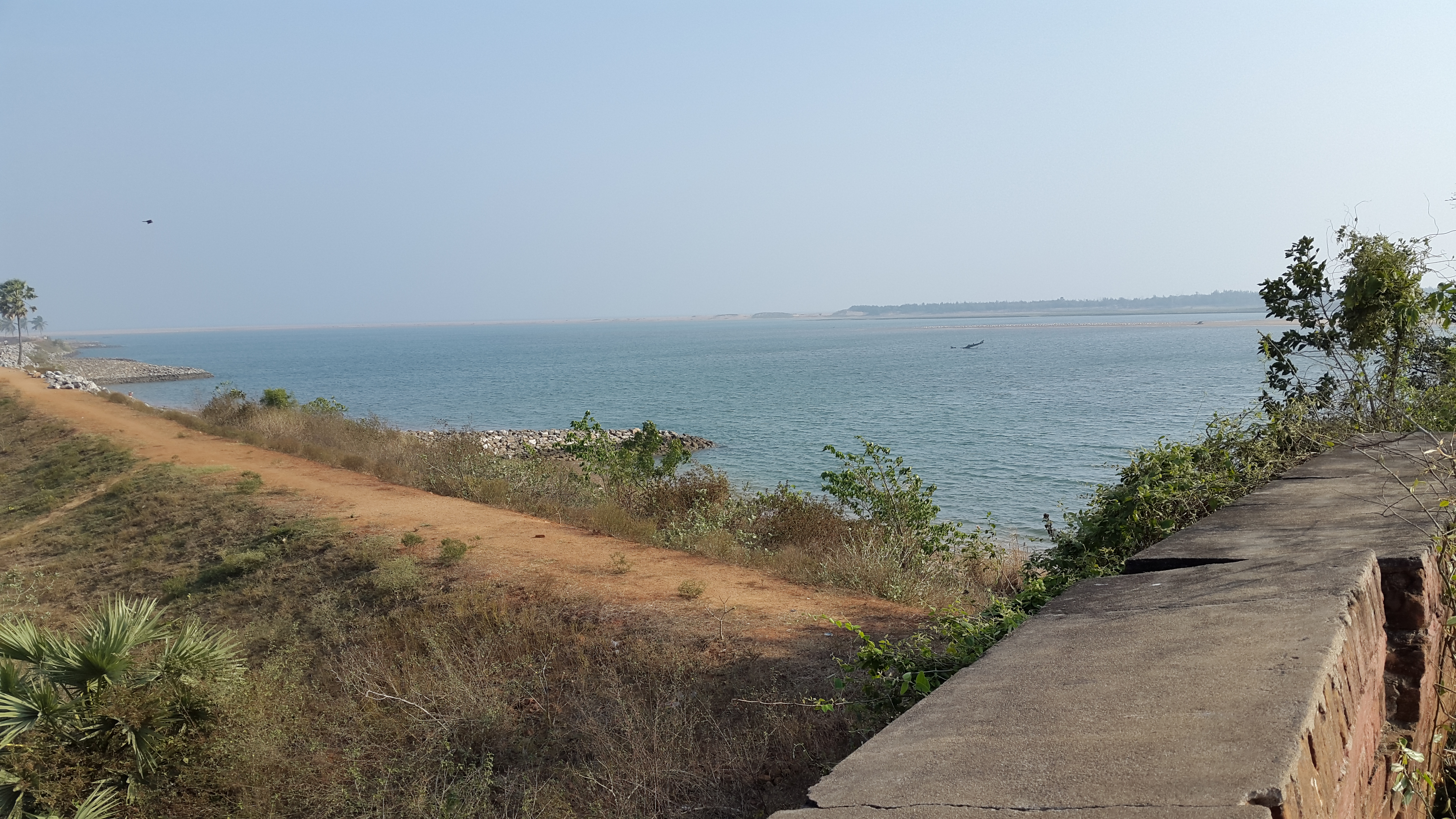
View of the Rushikulya River from the Ganjam fort

Brahmapur is situated in the basin; other important towns are Chhatrapur, Ganjam, Aska, Bhanjanagar, Bellaguntha, and Surada.

== Industries ==
Several large-scale industries have been set up in the basin. Among them are Grasim Industries Ltd-Ganjam Chemical Division (formerly Jayashree Chemical Ltd). Aska Co-operative Sugar Industries Ltd. Nuagam, Aska Spinning Mills, Monorama Chemical Works Ltd., Orissa Tubes Pvt. Ltd., etc. There are about 3360 small-scale industries of different categories, mainly food and allied, forest & wood-based, rubber and plastic products, and glass and ceramics. There is enough scope for setting up forest-based industries. The basin is rich in mineral wealth. The major economic minerals are clay, limestone, manganese, sand talc, black sand, and grinding materials.
