= Shanti Devi (Odisha politician) =

Indian politician

Member of Odisha Legislative Assembly
- In office February 1990 – March 1995
- Preceded by: Sarat Chandra Panda
- Succeeded by: Ananta Narayan Singh Deo
- Constituency: Surada Assembly constituency

Personal details
- Died: 4 June 2009
- Spouse: Ananta Narayan Singh Deo
- Relations: Nandini Devi (daughter in law)
- Children: Kishore Chandra Singh Deo

Shanti Devi was an Indian politician from the state of Odisha who served as Member of Odisha Legislative Assembly, Queen of Dharakote and Deputy Chairperson of Ganjam Zilla Parishad. In 1990 Odisha Legislative Assembly election, she got 45,201 votes.

== Personal life ==
She died on 4 June 2009. She married Ananta Narayan Singh Deo in April 1960. She was the mother of Kishore Chandra Singh Deo and mother-in-law of Nandini Devi.
