= State Highway 36 (Odisha) =

Road in Odisha, India

State Highway 36

Major junctions
- West end: Sorada
- Sheragada, Hinjilicut
- East end: Purushottampur

Location
- Country: India
- States: Odisha
- Primary destinations: Sorada, Badagada, Dharakot, Sheragada, Hinjilicut, Pandia, Purushottampur

Highway system
- Roads in India; Expressways; National; State; Asian

State Highway 36 (Odisha) is a state highway in Ganjam district of the Indian state of Odisha.

It connects Sorada to Purushottampur via Hinjilicut. It begins from National Highway 59 (India) and ends at State Highway 32 (Odisha).
