= Bandhaguda =

- Village
- Location in Orissa, India
- Coordinates: 19.5676°N 84.5842°E
- Country: India
- State: Odisha
- District: Ganjam

Population
  - Total: 1,000

Languages
  - Official: Oriya
- Time zone: UTC+5:30 (IST)
- PIN: 761106
- Telephone code: 06822
- Vehicle registration: OR-07/OD-07
- Nearest city: Sheragada, Aska, Berhampur
- Legislative Assembly Constituency: Hinjilicut
- Avg. Summer Temperature: 42 °C (108 °F)
- Avg. Winter Temperature: 24 °C (75 °F)
- Website: odisha.gov.in

Bandhaguda is a village under "Sheragada" block in Ganjam district, Odisha, India. It is also a "Grama Panchayat" consisting of six villages: B.Chikili, Bandhaguda, Chasamahuli, Gopapalli, Laxminursinghapur and Sadangipalli. It is 55 km from the Brahmapur city. Historically, this village has provided rural education to around 15 villages around the area. People get their primary education from Janata Uchha Prathamika Bidyalaya and secondary education is being provided by Sri Jagannath Vidyapeeth, Kansa.

== Economy ==
Around 55% of the work force get their living from agriculture. Agriculture is mainly dependent on monsoon rain. People of Bandhaguda believe in hard work. Banking Service is provided one Regional Rural Bank named Utkal Grameen Bank, Bandhaguda Branch, sponsored by state bank of India.

== Education ==
There are two schools which provides basic education to the student of Bandhaguda and to the students from nearby villages. Janata Upper Primary School provides education up to class VII and Sri Jagannath Bidyapeeth Kansa provides education to tenth class.

== Culture ==
People strongly believe in God and celebrate all the festivals jointly representing the true culture of Orissa. There are three ancient temples in the Village. They are Sri Krishna Temple, Sri Shiva Temple and Maa Kalika Temple.

The Big Hanuman statue situated in Bandhaguda is known as a symbol of protection for all the villagers.

Danda Nacha (In Oriya ଦଣ୍ଡ ନାଚ) of Bandhaguda of famous in while Ganjam District. In Danda nata, Maa Kalika goes out for 13 days from temple and comes back in Mesa Sankranti of Chaitra. The famous festival is popularly known as "Meru Yatra".

== Transport ==
Bandhaguda is connected to almost all small villages by Road. The local political leaders are very much active in building and maintaining public infrastructure of the village.

== Administration ==
Bandhaguda is a panchayat which consists of some near by villages. The leadership of some people in Bandhaguda helps to drive people towards employment in nearby villages too.
