= Asurabandha =

- Village/Grama Panchayat
- Location in Orissa, India
- Coordinates: 19.75°N 84.41°E
- Country: India
- State: Odisha
- District: Ganjam
- Asurabandha: 1914

Government
  - Type: Democratic
  - Body: Grama Panchayat

Languages
  - Official: Oriya
- Time zone: UTC+5:30 (IST)
- PIN: 761151
- Telephone code: 06819
- Vehicle registration: OR-07/OD-07
- Grama Panchayat: Asurabandha
- Block: Surada
- Sub-division: Bhanjanagar
- Legislative Assembly Constituency: Surada
- Website: odisha.gov.in

Asurabandha is a village/Grama Panchayat under Surada Block of Ganjam district in the state Odisha, India. It consists of 29 villages.

== Villages under Asurabandha Grama Panchayat ==
The 29 villages are:

1. Asurabandha, 2. Balasi, 3. Bhagabanpur, 4. Dantalingi, 5. Dhepapalli, 6. Dullada, 7. Ganjana, 8. Gobindapur, 9. Gunduribadi, 10. Kaithapalli, 11. Kathagada, 12. Kharikuti, 13. Liundi, 14. Maniakati, 15. Mayangi, 16. Mentiamba, 17. Murgapalli, 18. Nahaganda, 19. Padareisuni, 20. Paniamba, 21. Parasuramnagar, 22. Patapalli, 23. Rumapalli, 24. Sahanaganda, 25. Sanakharikotti, 26. Sandhabali, 27. T.D.Gochha, 28. Tala Dantilingi, 29. Upara Dantilingi

== Educational Institutions ==
- Ashramika High School, Asurabandha, Estd: 1985
- Upper Primary School, Asurabandha, Estd: 1965
- Nodal Upper Primary School, Dantalingi, Estd: 1918
- Nodal Upper Primary School, Bhagabanpur, Estd: 1925
- Nodal Upper Primary School, Dhepapalli, Estd: 1967
- Primary School, Asurabandha, Estd: 1914
- Primary School, Maniakathi, Estd: 1945
- Primary School, Mayangi, Estd: 1954
- Primary School, Gobindapur, Estd: 1956
- Primary School, Padareisuni, Estd: 1958
- Primary School, Gundiribadi, Estd: 1959
- Primary School, T.D.Gochha, Estd: 1961
- Primary School, Dullada, Estd: 1989
- Project Primary School, Kathagada, Estd: 2008
- Project Primary School, Rumapalli, Estd: 2008

== Worship Places ==
=== Hindu ===
- Maa Kandhuni Devi Temple, Padareisuni
  - It has very beautiful atmospheric surrounding at the temple side. Maa Kandhuni Devi was the tutelary deity of "Surada Royal Family". So, Raja Sandhadhanu Singh was also established Maa Kandhuni Devi's temple at Surada for daily worship purpose.

=== Christian ===
- Dantilingi Church, Dantilingi
  - This is a big church in the Dantilingi village. Every year a special worship is done in accordance to "Mother Lurdu Marry". She was very helpful for the local people and gave blessings for prosperity.
