= Ananta Narayan Singh Deo =

Indian politician (1929–2003)

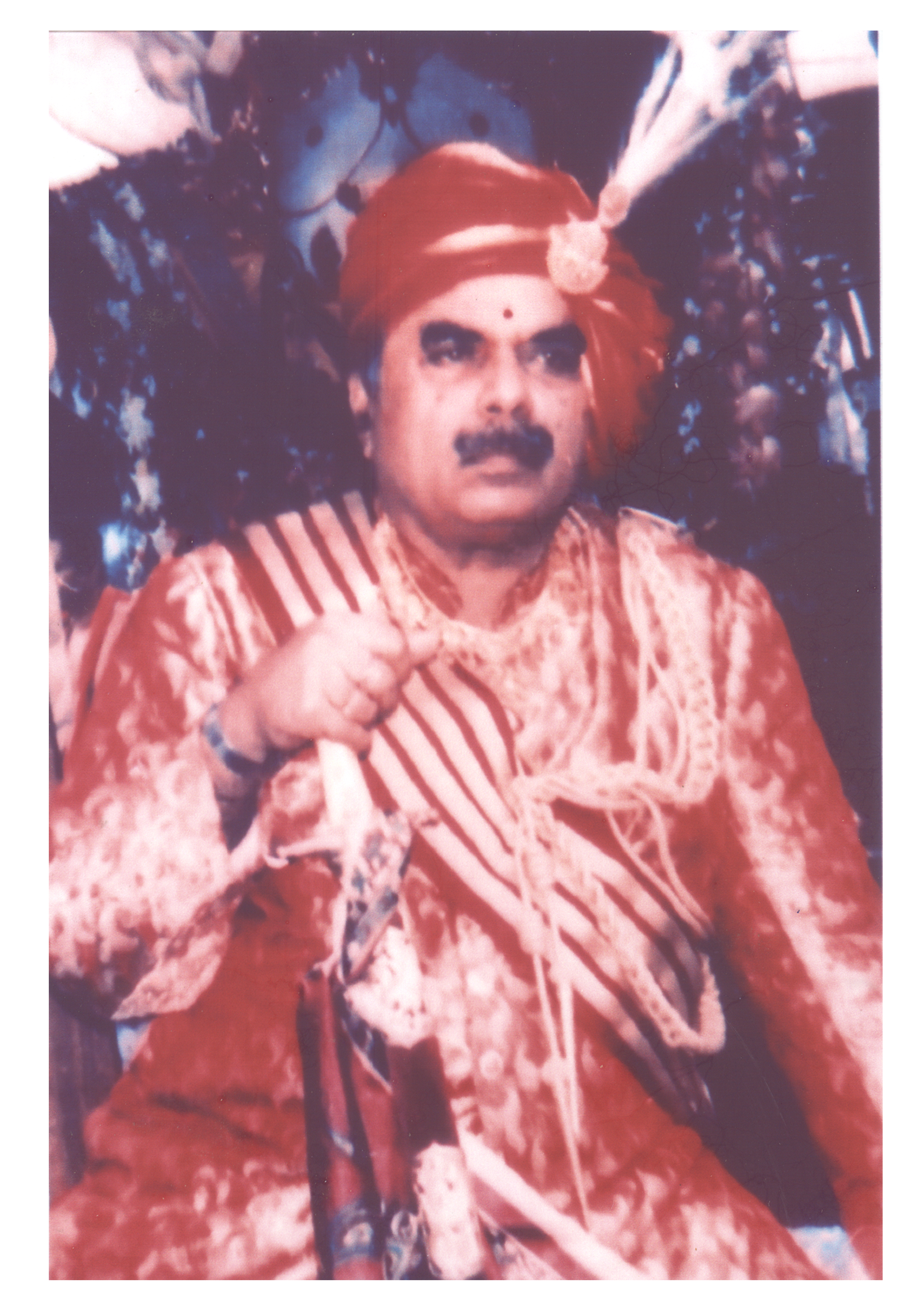

Member of 9th Lok Sabha
- In office 2 December 1989 – 13 March 1991
- Preceded by: Somanath Rath
- Succeeded by: Somanath Rath
- Constituency: Aska Lok Sabha constituency

Leader of Opposition in Odisha Legislative Assembly
- In office 13 February 1980 – 17 February 1980
- Preceded by: Prahalad Mallick
- Succeeded by: Sarat Kumar Dev

Personal details
- Born: 5 September 1929
- Died: 1 December 2003 (aged 74)
- Spouse: Shanti Devi
- Relations: Nandini Devi (daughter in law)
- Children: Kishore Chandra Singh Deo
- Education: Stewart School, Cuttack and The Doon School
- Alma mater: St. Stephen's College, Delhi

Ananta Narayan Singh Deo (5 September 1929 – 1 December 2003) was an Indian ruler and politician who served as Member of 9th Lok Sabha from Aska Lok Sabha constituency, 13th Leader of Opposition in Odisha Legislative Assembly from Surada Assembly constituency, Deputy Minister for Industries, Commerce, Community Development and Panchayat Raj in Cabinet of Odisha and Raja of Dharakote Estate.

== Personal life ==
Ananta Narayan Singh Deo was born on 5 September 1929. He was educated in Stewart School, Cuttack and passed Senior Cambridge from The Doon School and was graduated from St. Stephen's College, Delhi in 1951. He married Shanti Devi in April 1960. His son is Kishore Chandra Singh Deo and daughter in law is Nandini Devi. Deo died on 1 December 2003, at the age of 74.

== Career ==
On 13 February 1980, he replaced Prahallad Mallick as Leader of the Opposition. He was the runner up for 2000 Odisha Legislative Assembly election and 1980 Odisha Legislative Assembly election from Patnagarh Assembly constituency.
