= Ramesh Chandra Jena (politician) =

Politician from Odisha, India

Member of the Odisha Legislative Assembly
- Incumbent
- Assumed office 23 May 2019
- Preceded by: Nandini Devi
- Constituency: Sanakhemundi
- In office 2009–2014
- Preceded by: position established
- Succeeded by: Nandini Devi
- Constituency: Sanakhemundi

Personal details
- Born: 7 May 1975 (age 50) Sanakhemundi, Odisha, India
- Party: Independent (March 2026-Present)
- Other political affiliations: Indian National Congress (till 2026)
- Spouse: Jochhna Jena
- Parent: Arakhita Jena (mother)

Ramesh Chandra Jena is an Indian politician from Odisha. He is currently serving as an MLA in Odisha Legislative Assembly from Sanakhemundi as a Member of Indian National Congress.
