= Badagada =

- Census Town
- Location in Odisha, India Badagada (India)
- Coordinates: 19.65°N 84.40°E
- Country: India
- State: Odisha
- District: Ganjam
- Tehsil: Surada
- Elevation: 27 m (89 ft)

Population (2011)
  - Total: 6,982

Languages
  - Official: Odia
- Time zone: UTC+5:30 (IST)
- PIN: 761109
- STD telephone code: 06819
- Vehicle registration: OD-32; OD-07 (old OR-07)

Badagada (also Bada-Gada) is a census town and former zamindari (feudal) estate in the Sorada Block of Ganjam district, Odisha, India.

== Geography ==
Badagada is located on the banks of the River Jarau at 19.6450°N 84.4079°E. It has an average elevation of 27 m (89 ft).

== History ==
This place was earlier under Khindirisrunga (ଖିଣ୍ଡିରିଶୃଙ୍ଗ) or Khidisingi (ଖିଡ଼ିସିଙ୍ଗି) Mandala which comprised present day Sorada, Dharakot, Sheragada blocks of Ganjam district (also includes some parts of Mohana block of Gajapati district). In 1476, Raja Baliar Singh divided the Khidisingi kingdom into four different estates due to early demise of his elder son. Badagada went to his grandson, Raja Daman Singh. Since Daman Singh was the successor of Baliar Singh's eldest son the naming of this place became Badagada which means The Big One's Fort.

- Badagada – Raja Daman Singh (Baliar Singh's grandson from his eldest son)
- Dharakot – Raja Hadu Singh
- Sorada – Raja Sandhadhanu Singh (also known as Abhaya Pratap)
- Sheragada – Raja Parsuram Singh (Minor) (Represented by Raja Baliar himself).

== Notable people ==
- Uma Charan Patnaik - Lawyer, Freedom fighter, Public representative.

== Politics ==
Badagada is a part of Surada Assembly Constituency. The MLA from Surada Assembly Constituency is Nilamani Bisoyi of BJP, who won the seat in the state general assembly election in 2024.

Badagada is a part of Aska (Lok Sabha constituency).

== Sources ==
- "Odisha govt site".
- http://www.worksodisha.gov.in/shdp.html
