= Amrutulu =

- Village/Grama Panchayat
- Location in Orissa, India
- Coordinates: 19.72°N 84.42°E
- Country: India
- State: Odisha
- District: Ganjam

Government
  - Type: Democratic
  - Body: Grama Panchayat

Languages
  - Official: Odia
- Time zone: UTC+5:30 (IST)
- PIN: 761108
- Telephone code: 06819
- Vehicle registration: OR-07/OD-07
- Grama Panchayat: Amrutulu
- Sub-division: Bhanjanagar
- Lok Sabha Constituency: Aska
- Block: Surada
- Legislative Assembly Constituency: Surada

Amrutulu is a village and also a gram panchayat in the Surada block of Ganjam district in Odisha, India. Amrutulu Panchayat consists of four villages, Amrutulu, Balighai, Buguda and Pankalabadi.

== Geography ==
It is situated in the south-western part of Surada, 9 km. from Surada.

== Notable residents ==
- Purna Chandra Swain, Member of the Legislative Assembly for Surada from 2014.
