= Suramani =

Villiage in Odisha, India

Coordinates: 19.719783°N 84.503957°E

Suramani is a village located in Surada Tehsil of Ganjam district in Odisha, India. It is situated 45 km away from sub-district headquarter Surada and 100 km from district headquarter Chatrapur. Surada is the nearest town to Suramani which is approximately 11 km away.

It is known for the weaver community residing in it. It is a religious villages with festivals & fairs celebrated around the year.

As per 2011 census, its population is 2,364 with 1,156 males and 1,208 females. The postal code of Suramani is 761107. The total geographical area of village is 335 hectares, with 513 houses.
