= Baunsalundi =

Baunsalundi Baunsalundi
- village
- Location in Odisha, India
- Coordinates: 19°55′59″N 84°34′6″E
- Country: India
- State: Odisha
- District: Ganjam

Government
  - Type: Democratic

Languages
  - Official: Odia
- Time zone: UTC+5:30 (IST)
- PIN: 761133

Baunsalundi is a small Indian village in Gram Panchayat Baunsalundi located near Bhanjanagar of Ganjam district in Odisha. It is located 91 km towards North from District Headquarters Chhatrapur. 162 km from State capital Bhubaneswar. . Odia is the Language here.

== Geography ==
The village is located at 19° 55′ 59″ N & 84° 34′ 06″ E.Belaguntha, Asika, Hinjilicut, Phulabani, Berhampur are the nearby Cities to Baunsalundi

== Demography ==
Baunsalundi is in the Ghumusar tehsil, which is surrounded by Bellaguntha tehsil towards east, Surada tehsil towards South, Jagannathprasad tehsil towards east, Buguda tehsil towards east. The Baunsalundi village has population of 3790 of which 1972 are males while 1818 are females in the census of 2011. In Baunsalundi village population of children with age 0-6 is 412 which makes up 10.87% of total population of village. Average Sex Ratio of Baunsalundi village is 922 which is lower than Orissa state average of 979. Child Sex Ratio for the Baunsalundi as per census is 839, lower than Orissa average of 941. Baunsalundi village has higher literacy rate compared to Orissa. In 2011, literacy rate of Baunsalundi village was 90.02% compared to 72.87% of Orissa. Male literacy stands at 93.54% while female literacy rate was 86.26%. As per constitution of India and Panchyati Raaj Act, Baunsalundi village is administrated by sarpanch (head of village) who is elected representative of village.

== Transportation ==
There is no railway station at Baunsalundi. Berhampur is the nearest railway station located 162 km from State Capital Bhubaneswar.
