= Stewart School, Cuttack =

Stewart School

Location
- Mission Road, Buxi Bazar Rd, Cuttack, Odisha; India
- Coordinates: 20.475941°N 85.869674°E

Information
- Former name: Protestant European School
- Type: Private
- Motto: Domini Timor Prima Sapientia ("Fear of the Lord is the beginning of Wisdom") (Fear of the Lord is the beginning of Wisdom)
- Religious affiliation: Christian
- Established: 1882
- Founder: Dr. William Day Stewart
- School district: Cuttack
- Management: Diocese of Cuttack, Church of North India
- Principal: D. Martina
- Faculty: 80
- Affiliation: Council for the Indian School Certificate Examinations
- Website: stewartschoolctc.in

Stewart School, Cuttack is an Indian Christian school, located on Mission Road, Buxi Bazar in Cuttack, Odisha. Stewart School, Cuttack was founded in 1882 by Dr. William Day Stewart, a Civil Surgeon based at Cuttack. The school is affiliated to the Council for the Indian School Certificate Examinations, New Delhi.

== History and administration ==
Stewart School, Cuttack was founded in 1882 by Chennai born (1 May 1840) Briton Dr. William Day Stewart, a Civil Surgeon based at Cuttack. He was also instrumental in converting the Pilgrim's Hospital to a Medical Schools in 1875 at Cuttack. The school, that started in 1882 was re-christened Stewart School in 1919 after its founder William Day Stewart, a civil surgeon. Stewart School began as the European Orphanage School in November 1882. Soon, it came to be known as the Protestant European School (in 1891) and in the same year its doors opened to Indian students. In 1910, the school was recognized as a Higher Elementary School by the Inspector of European Schools, Bihar and Orissa. The name of the school was altered to Stewart School, Cuttack, to perpetuate the name of its Founder, Dr. Stewart. In 1924 the school was confirmed in the status of Junior Secondary School and the Cambridge Syndicate sanctioned the opening of a centre for Cambridge Examinations in the school. In the year 1974, the school was affiliated to CISCE, New Delhi. Stewart School, Cuttack is an Anglo-Indian School and its Principal is the State's only non-official representative on the Inter-State Board for Anglo-Indian Education. Dr William Day Stewart the founder of Stewart and the Medical school died on 23 November 1890 in Cuttack and is buried at the local 'European Gora Kabar' cemetery.

The school is under the management of the Diocese of Cuttack, Church of North India. The principal is Mrs. D. Martina.

There are five Stewart Schools in Odisha under the management of the Diocese of Cuttack. Stewart School, Cuttack, is the oldest among the five. It consistently has students figuring in the top ten of Eastern Indian Indian Certificate of Secondary Education schools.

Apart from the school, there is a college named Stewart Science College. It is affiliated with the Council of Higher Secondary Education, Odisha.

The Stewart School, Cuttack is a Christian Minority Educational Institution, which is managed by the Managing Committee of the School. It is a Charitable Un-Aided Minority Educational. It does not receive any kind of financial assistance from the state either for development, maintenance of infrastructure or towards the salary of the staff. The sole income of the school is from the fees collected from the parents. It runs on no profit. The Stewart School, Cuttack is affiliated to the ICSE council, New Delhi and has received the Minority Status Certificate on 26 February 2009 from the National Commission for Minority Educational Institution (NCMEI), Government of India, New Delhi vide F. No. 1568 of 2008-3415.

== Notable alumni ==
- Netaji Subhash Chandra Bose – founder of the Indian National Army; born in Cuttack; studied in the school till class seven.
- Ananta Narayan Singh Deo - Politician, Former royal scion of Dharakote
- Ajit Jain - Vice Chairman of Insurance Operations for Berkshire Hathaway
- Ranjib Biswal - former Indian cricketer and the former Chairman of Indian Premier League
- Jayanta Mahapatra - Eminent Indian poet

== See also ==
- Christianity in Odisha
- Education in Odisha
- List of schools in Odisha
