= Kishore Chandra Singh Deo =

Indian politician

Member of Odisha Legislative Assembly
- Preceded by: Usha Rani Panda
- Succeeded by: Purna Chandra Swain
- Constituency: Surada Assembly constituency

Personal details
- Born: 2 July 1961
- Died: 28 May 2010 (aged 48)
- Spouse: Nandini Devi
- Parent(s): Ananta Narayan Singh Deo and Shanti Devi

Kishore Chandra Singh Deo was an Indian politician who served as Member of Odisha Legislative Assembly from Surada Assembly constituency.

== Personal life ==
He was born on 2 July 1961 and died on 28 May 2010. He died from heart attack. His spouse was Nandini Devi who served as MLA in Odisha Legislative Assembly. He was the son of Ananta Narayan Singh Deo who served as Ruler of Dharakote and Shanti Devi who served as MLA in Odisha Legislative Assembly.
