= Parvatadvaraka dynasty =

Indian dynasty

Parvatadvarakas of Asurgarh
- 5th century–6th century
- Capital: Parvatadvaraka
- Religion: Hinduism
- Government: Monarchy
- History
  - Established: 5th century
  - Disestablished: 6th century
Preceded by	Succeeded by
Rajarsitulyakula dynasty	Sharabhapuriya dynasty
- Today part of: India

The Parvatadvaraka dynasty was a royal house that controlled the Tel river valley (Kalahandi) in the Indian state of Orrisa. The Parvatadvarakas were devotees of the goddess Stambhesvari.

== List of rulers ==
The known rulers of Parvatadvaraka include:

- Sobhanaraja
- Tustikara

== See also ==
- Asurgarh
- History of Odisha
