= Sharabhapuriya dynasty =

Indian dynasty

Sharabhapuriyas of Dakshina Kosala
- 5th century–6th century
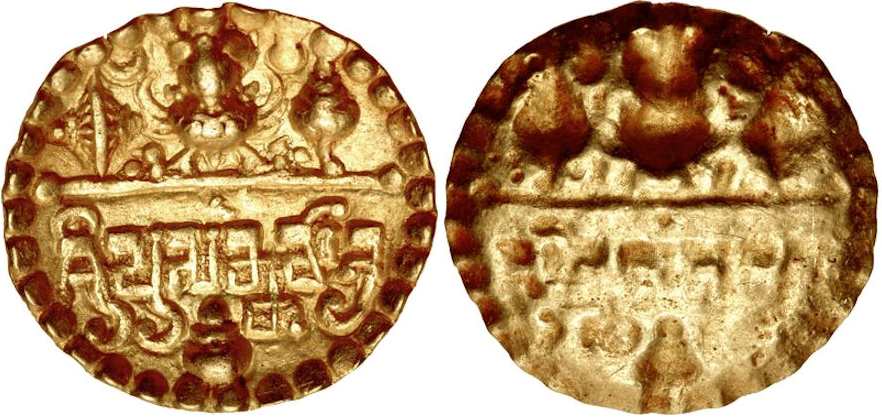
- Coinage of king "Sri Prasannamatra" of the Sarabhapuriyas in Kosala. Circa 525-550.

- Location of the Sharabhapuriyas and neighbouring South Asian polities circa 500 CE.
- Status: Kingdom
- Capital: Sharabhapura, Shripura
- Religion: Vaishnavism
- Government: Monarchy
- History
  - Established: 5th century
  - Disestablished: 6th century
Preceded by
Gupta dynasty
Nala dynasty
Parvatadvaraka dynasty
Succeeded by
Panduvamshis of Dakshina Kosala
- Today part of: India

The Sharabhapuriya (IAST: Śarabhapurīya) dynasty ruled parts of present-day Chhattisgarh and Odisha in India, during 5th and 6th centuries. The dynasty probably served as Gupta vassals in their early days, but became practically independent as the Gupta empire declined. The Sharabhapuriyas were succeeded by the Panduvamshis. The dynasty is known mainly from its copper-plate inscriptions, and a few coins.

== Name ==
The self-designation of the dynasty is not known: the historians call the family Sharabhapuriyas, because the majority of the dynasty's inscription were issued from the Sharabhapura (IAST: Śarabhapura) town.

D. C. Sircar theorised that the dynasty was known as Amararyakula, based on the Malhar inscription of a ruler called Vyaghraraja. However, A. M. Shastri has opposed this theory, arguing that Vyaghraraja was not associated with the Sharabhapuriya dynasty.

== Period ==
A. M. Shastri estimates the reigns of the Sharabhapuriya rulers as follows: based on Sharabha's identification with the Sharabharaja mentioned in the 510 CE Eran inscription, he assigns Sharabha's reign to 475–500 CE (assuming a 25-year reign). Similarly, he assigns 25 years to the next two kings. Since Jayaraja's latest inscription is dated to 9th regnal year, Shastri assumes a 10-year reign for Jayaraja, and some subsequent kings.

- Sharabha (Śarabha), c. 475–500 CE
- Narendra, c. 500–525 CE
- Prasanna, c. 525–550 CE
- Jayarāja, c. 550–560 CE
- Sudevarāja, c 560–570 CE
- Manamatra alias Durgarāja, c. 570–580 CE
- Sudevarāja, c. 570–580 CE
- Pravarāja, c. 580–590 CE

Alternative dates have been proposed by other historians. For example, D. C. Sircar estimated Sharabha's reign as 465–480 CE, while V. V. Mirashi estimated it as 460–480 CE.

== Territory ==
Find spots of the Sharabhapuriya inscriptions

Most of the dynasty's grants have been found in and around Malhar and Raipur, in the historical Dakshin Kosala region. These inscriptions were issued from Shrabhapura and Shripura. The identification of Sharabhapura is not certain, while Shripura (IAST: Śripura) has been identified with modern Sirpur. Some scholars have identified Sharabhapura with places in present-day Andhra Pradesh and Odisha, but these places are located far away from the find spots of the inscriptions; it is more likely that Sharabhapura was located in or around the present-day Raipur district. KD Bajpai and SK Pandey identified Sharabhapura with Malhar, but A. M. Shastri points out that the excavations at Malhar reveal that the establishment of the town can be dated to c. 1000 BCE or earlier. Therefore, it cannot be identified as a city established by Sharabha who ruled nearly 1500 years later. Moreover, there is no evidence that Malhar was called Sharabhapura: its earliest known name is Mallala or Mallala-pattana. Hira Lal once theorised that the Sharabhapura was another name for Shripura, but this theory is now discredited.

Sharabhapura appears to have been the original capital of the dynasty. A. M. Shastri theorises that Sudevaraja established Shripura and made the town his second capital; his successor Pravararaja moved the kingdom's capital to Shripura.

== History ==
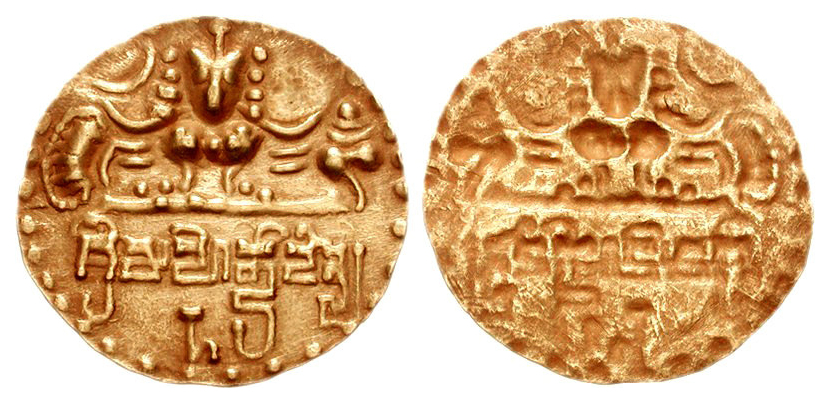
Coinage of “Sri Mahendraditya”, possibly of the Sarabhapuriya Dynasty. Garuda bird flanked by discus and conch; Brahmi legend below.

The dynasty is known only from a few inscriptions and coins. The inscriptions record grants, and do not provide much information about the dynasty's history, although some of the seals on the inscriptions provide a brief genealogy. Because of this, the reconstruction of the Sharabhapuriya chronology is difficult. The Allahabad pillar inscription of the Gupta king Samudragupta states that he defeated one Mahendra, ruler of Kosala. One theory identifies this Mahendra as a Sharabhapuriya ruler. However, there is no concrete evidence in support of this theory.

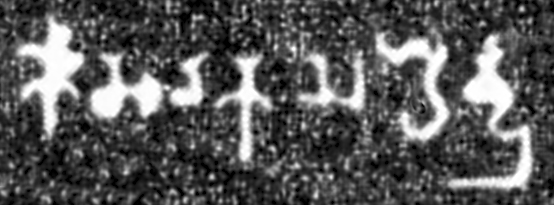
"Mahendra of Kosala" (Brahmi script: Kausalaka Mahendra) in Line 19 of the Allahabad Pillar inscription of Samudragupta (r.350-375 CE)

=== Sharabha ===
Sharabha is the earliest known king, who can be regarded as a member of the dynasty with certainty. He is known from two inscriptions of his son Narendra. The name suggests that he established the city of Sharabhapura (and probably the dynasty). His territory most probably included the area around the Raipur district.

A 510 CE Eran inscription mentions one Sharabharaja as the maternal grandfather of one Goparaja, who died in a battle. Based on the identification of this Sharabharaja with the Sharabhapuriya king Sharabha, A. M. Shastri dates his rule to c. 475–500 CE. This estimate is also supported by paleographic evidence: the 'box-headed' characters of the Sharabhapuriya inscriptions appear to be an advanced version of the similar characters used in the inscriptions of the Vakatakas, whose rule ended around 500 CE.

The Kurud inscription of Sharabha's son Narendra records the renewal of a grant that was originally made by a Parama-bhattaraka ("Supreme Overlord") to a Brahmin, after the original donor took a bath in the Ganga river. The original grant was recorded on palm leaves, which were destroyed in a house fire. A. M. Shastri identifies the Parama-bhattaraka with a Gupta emperor (the Gupta capital Pataliputra was located on the banks of the Ganga river). He theorises that Narendra's Sharabha began his career as a Gupta vassal.

=== Narendra ===
Maharaja Narendra, the son of Sharabha, issued the earliest extant grant of the dynasty. His Kurud inscription states that he renewed a grant issued by the Parama-bhattaraka for the latter's merit. This suggests that he continued to acknowledge the Gupta suzerainty at least until the 24th year of his reign. The fact that the inscription omits the overlord's name suggests that he had become practically independent, and acknowledged the Gupta suzerainty only nominally.

The Kurud grant was issued from the "camp of victory" at Tilakeshvara. It describes Narendra as a devotee of Bhagavat (Vishnu).

=== Prasanna ===
Prasanna is known from the seals of his son Jayaraja and grandson Sudevaraja. He is also known from some gold coins that mention his name as Prasannamatra. The issuance of gold coins suggests that he was a powerful ruler, although he may have continued to acknowledge nominal Gupta suzerainty. The coins feature a standing garuda, flanked by a crescent moon, a wheel and a conch-shell. Besides Chhattisgarh, these coins have been discovered in the Kalahandi district of Odisha and the Chanda district of Maharashtra. This suggests that he ruled an extensive territory, although this cannot be said with certainty.

His relationship with Narendra is not certain: he may have been Narendra's son or his descendant. Prasanna had two sons: Jayaraja and Manamatra (the successor of Jayaraja).

=== Other kings ===
Jayaraja
Jayaraja was a son of Prasanna. He was the first ruler of the dynasty to add the prefix Mahat to his name, a practice followed not only by his descendants but also by the kings of the later dynasties such as the Panduvamshis and the Somavanshis.

Manamatra alias Durgaraja
Manamatra was another son of Prasanna. He had two sons: Sudevaraja and Pravararaja (successor of Sudevaraja).

Sudevaraja
Sudevaraja was a son of Manamatra. He seems to have established Shripura, where the earliest inscriptions were issued during his reign.

Pravararaja
Pravararaja was another son of Manamatra. He appears to have moved the kingdom's capital from Sharabhapura to Shripura.

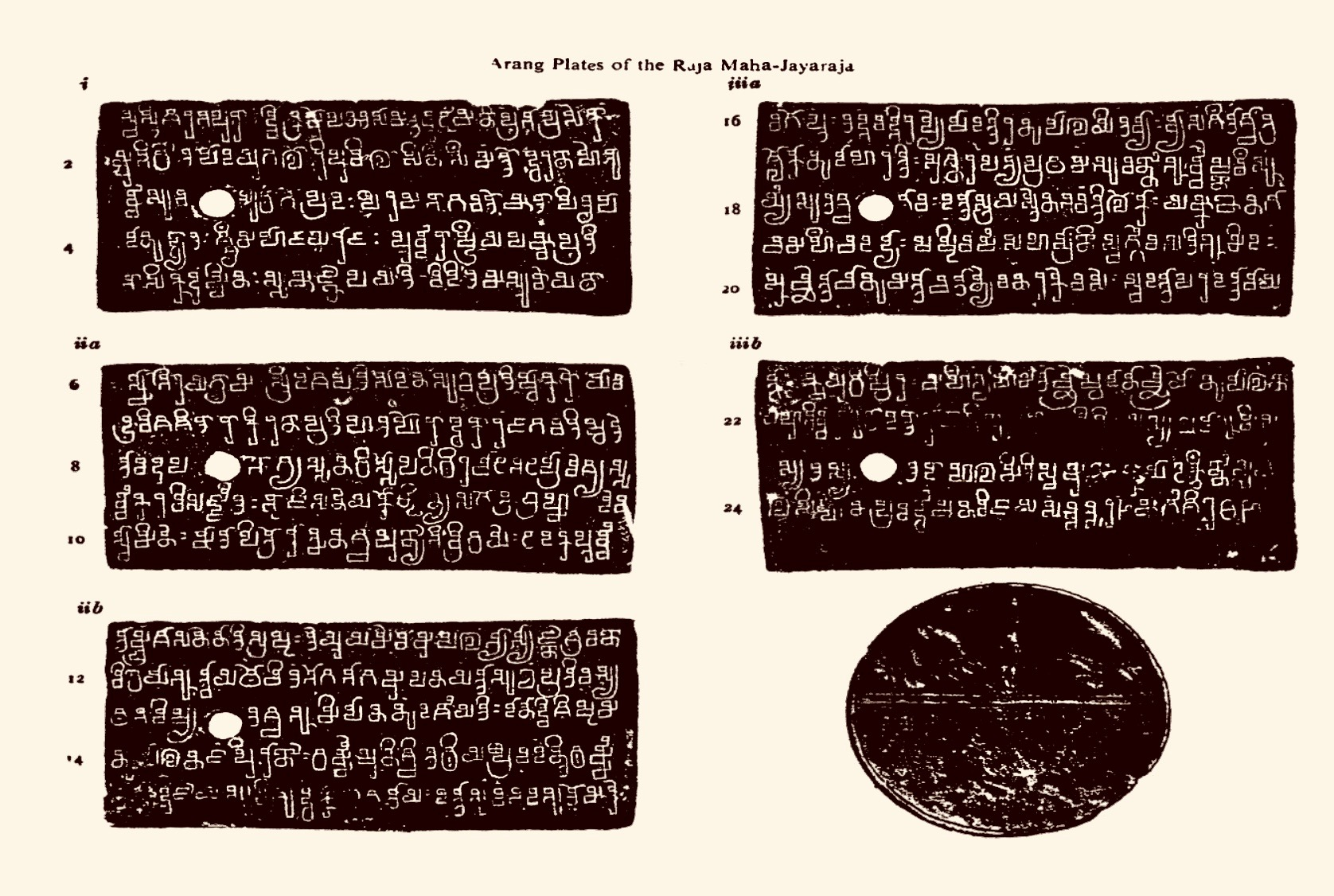
Arang inscription of Jayaraja

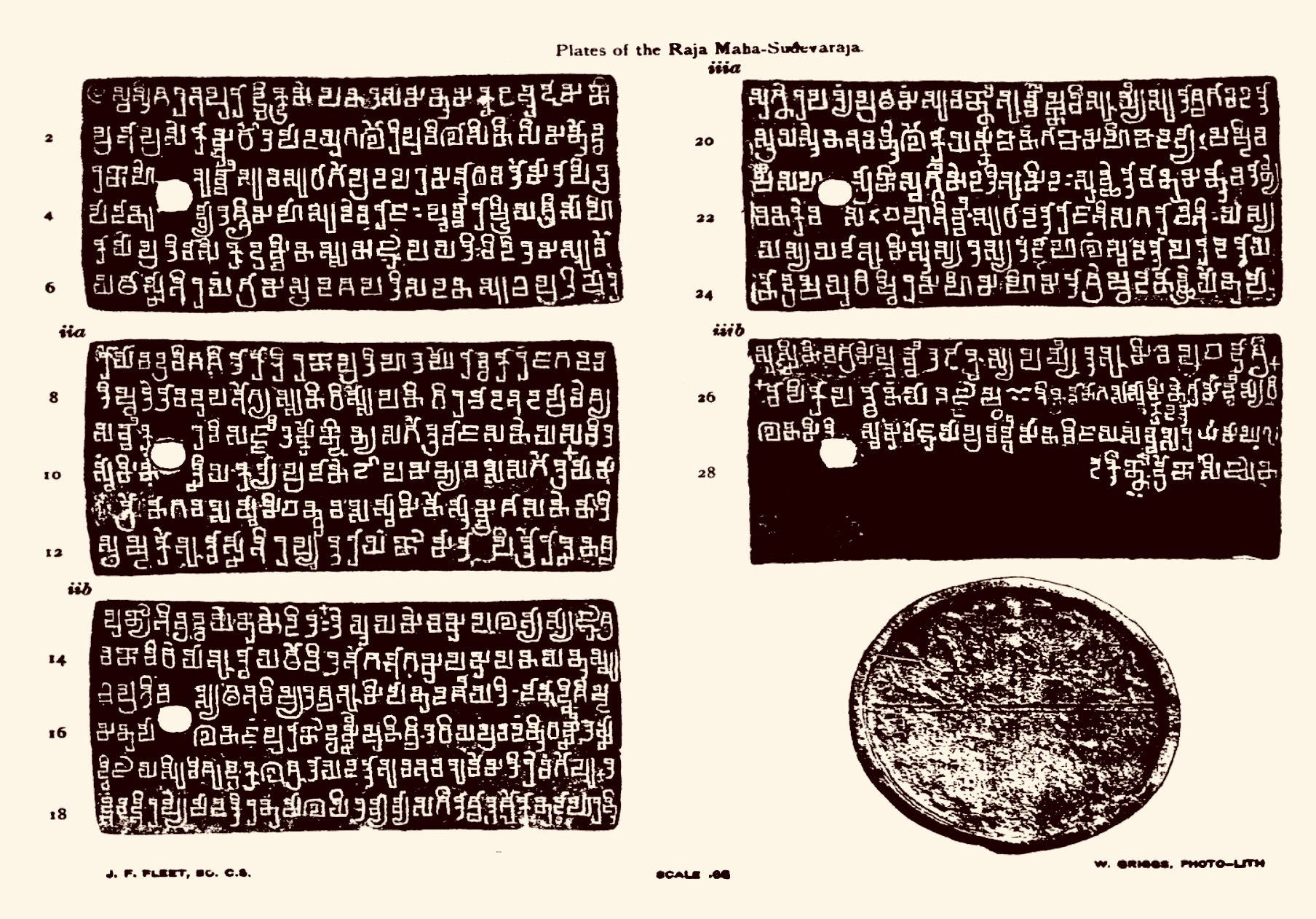
Raipur inscription of Sudevaraja

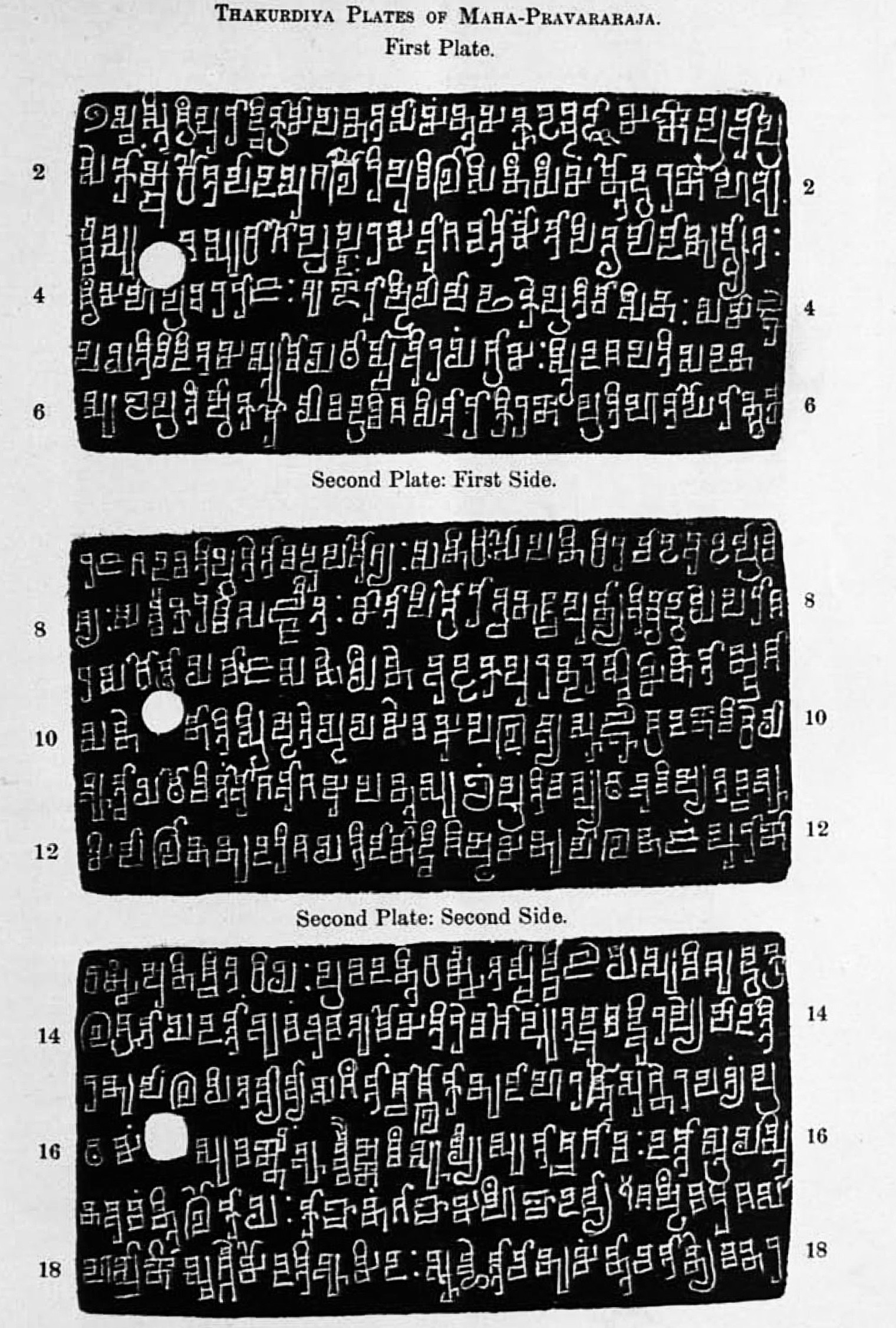
Thakurdiya inscription Pravararaja

=== Decline ===
No successors of Pravararaja are known with certainty. An inscription of one Vyaghraraja has been discovered at Malhar. This inscription was issued from a town called Prasanna-pura, and describes Vyaghraraja as the son of Pravara-bhattaraka. D. C. Sircar and some others theorised that Vyaghraraja was a Sharabhapuriya king: Prasannapura may have been named after his ancestor Prasanna. The inscription also mentions one Jaya-bhattaraka, who has been identified with Jayaraja. Ajaya Miatra Shastri has contested this theory on several grounds. Vyaghraraja's inscription features 'nail-headed' characters unlike the box-headed characters of the Sharabhapuriya inscriptions. Its seal, its textual style and its grant order are also different from those of the Sharabhapuriya inscriptions.

The Sharabhapuriyas were succeeded by the Panduvamshi dynasty. The Panduvamshi inscriptions follow the three-copper-plates style of the Sharabhapuriyas.

== Religion ==
All the Sharabhapuriya kings were devotees of Vishnu, and worshipped Krishna Vasudeva as the supreme deity. Like the imperial Guptas, they adopted the Vaishnavite epithet Parama-Bhagavata in their inscriptions. Their rule is considered as a landmark in the spread of Vaishnavaism in present-day Odisha.

== Inscriptions ==
17 copper-plate grant inscriptions issued by the Sharabhapuriya have been discovered. 11 of these inscriptions were issued from Sharabhapura, whose location is uncertain. The vast majority of the records have been found in present-day Chhattisgarh. The inscriptions record land grants made to Brahmins for the merit of the donor and his parents.

All the inscriptions record grants, and comprise three rectangular copper-plates. The inscriptions are tied together by a ring, whose ends are joined by a circular seal (although some of the discovered inscriptions are missing the seal). The outer sides of the first and third copper plates are blank in the early inscriptions, presumably as a safeguard against weathering from exposure. However, in several of the later records, the outer side of the third copper plate is inscribed, presumably to accommodate the large amount of text.

All the inscriptions written in the so-called "box-headed" script. The tops of the characters appear to be small square-shaped boxes, resulting in this nomenclature. These characters are similar to the ones occurring in the Vakataka records. However, the Vakataka characters are less stylised, and therefore, can be assigned to an earlier period. It is not certain if the Sharabhapuriya characters are a result of the Vakataka influence.

The language used in the inscriptions is Sanskrit, which appears to have been the dynasty's official language. Prakrit influence can be noticed in some stray cases. The inscriptions begin with a symbol representing the word siddham (translated as "success" or "hail!"), followed by the word svasti. Next, the records mention the place of issue, the ruling monarch and the land grant order. Finally, the inscription exhorts the future kings to uphold the grant, followed by imprecatory verses (to curse those who dishonour the grant) and benedictory verses (to bless those who honour the grant). The inscriptions end with the date and the name of the scribe.

The grants are dated in the regnal years of the ruling king. The date is mentioned in form of the regal year, followed by the month and then the day. The days are numbered 1–30, and there is no mention of a fortnight. It is not clear if the month starts from the full moon day (purnimanta) or from the new moon day (amanta). The Panduvamshis, who succeeded the Sharabhapuriyas and adopted their style of inscriptions, followed the purnimanta system. Therefore, it is very likely that the months mentioned in the Sharabhapuriya inscriptions also followed the purnimanta system.

Sharabhapuriya-era inscriptions
Find spot	Reigning king	Regnal year	Issued at	Note
Pipardula	Narendra	3	Sharabhapura	Village grant made by Rahudeva and endorsed by Narendra. The grant gives the donee the right to collect revenue from the village residents.
Kurud	Narendra	24	Tilakeshvara military camp	Records the renewal of a grant originally recorded on palm-leaves and destroyed in a fire. The grant gives the donee a share in the village's agricultural produce and cash.
Rawan / Malhar	Narendra	Unknown	Sharabhapura	Grant; only one plate has survived. The inscription was found in possession of a resident of the Rawan village, who had found it at Malhar.
Amguda (or Amgura)	Jayaraja	3	Sharabhapura	Village grant
Malhar	Jayaraja	5	Sharabhapura	Grant made by Hadappagraha Vatsa and approved by Jayaraja
Arang	Jayaraja	5	Sharabhapura	The seal depicts a representation of Lakshmi
Malhar	Jayaraja	9	Sharabhapura	Grant
Khariar	Sudevaraja	2	Sharabhapura	Grant. Also called the Nahna or Naina inscription after a place in the Kalahandi District. However, the original find spot of the inscription was Khariar in Raipur district.
Dhamatari	Sudevaraja	3	Shripura	
Arang	Sudevaraja	7	Sharabhapura	Grant made by Pratihara Bhogilla and endorsed by Sudevaraja
Kauwatal	Sudevaraja	7	Shripura	Grant
Sirpur	Sudevaraja	7	Sharabhapura	Grant made by Nanna, and endorsed by Sudevaraja
Raipur	Sudevaraja	10	Sharabhapura	Grant made by Savitrsvamin to his sons-in-law Naga-vatsa-svamin and Bandhu-vatsa-svamin, and approved by Sudevaraja
Sarangarh	Sudevaraja	Unknown	Sharabhapura	Grant made by the chief queen and other members of the royal family, and approved by the king
Malhar	Pravararaja	3	Shripura	Grant
Thakurdiya	Pravararaja	3	Shripura	Grant
Pokhara	Unknown	Unknown	Unknown	Only the second plate has been found; Grant made by one Dandachakra, and approved by the issuer.

== Coinage ==
Prasanna or Prasannamatra is the only king of the dynasty known from a coin. His coins have been discovered from Sirpur (ancient Shripura).
