= Soroda Estate =

- Zamindari of British India
- 1476–1833
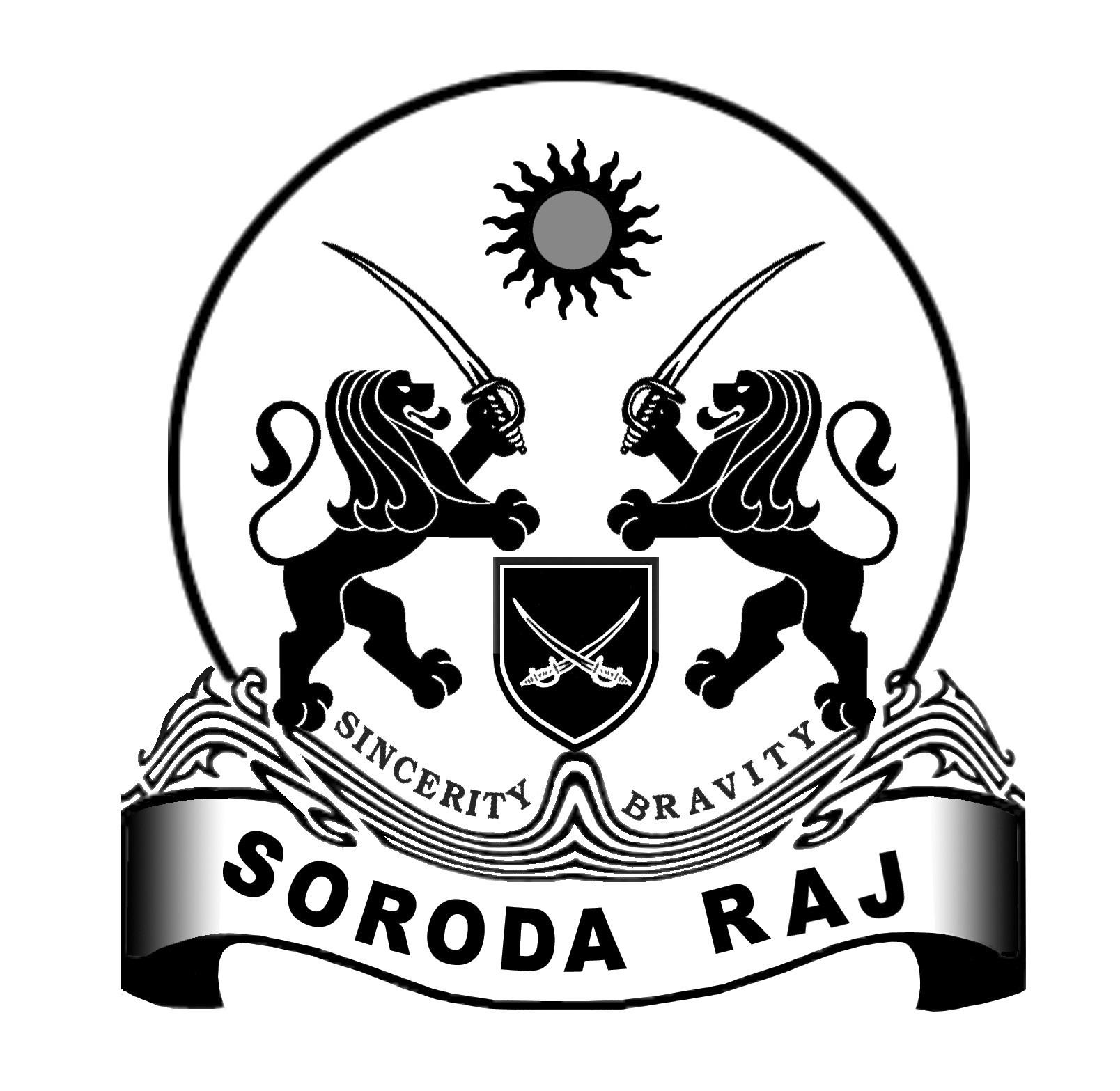
- Emblem of Soroda Estate
- Capital: Sorada
- Area
  - 1877: 46 km^{2} (18 sq mi)
- Population
  - 1877: 15,324
- History
  - Established: 1476
  - Revolt against British rule: 1833
Preceded by	Succeeded by
Gajapati Empire	British Raj
- Today part of: Odisha, India

Soroda Estate, present day Sorada, was a zamindari (feudal fief) in the north-western part of Ganjam district of Odisha, India.

The Soroda dynasty originates from the Khidisingi clan who were the descendants of the Nala dynasty of the Kalinga region. According to the Census Report of T.J. Maltby of 1880, Raja Sobha Chandra Singh of Sabeijaipur established Khidisingi estate in 1168 which comprised present day Sorada, Dharakot, Sheragada blocks of Ganjam district (also includes some parts of Mohana block of Gajapati district). In 1476, Raja Baliar Singh divided Khidisingi into four different estates after the untimely demise of his eldest son. Surada estate went to his third son, Raja Sandhadhanu Singh.
