= Sashibhusan Rath =

Social reformer, Public representative, Industrialist and Freedom fighter from Odisha

- Born: Sashibhusan Mohapatra; 1 January 1885; Sorada, Ganjam district, Madras Presidency, British Raj
- Died: 20 March 1943 (aged 58); Berhampur, Orissa Province, British Raj
- Education: Matric
- Alma mater: Russelkonda Board School, Bhanjanagar; Higher Secondary School, Paralakhemundi
- Occupations: Social reformer, public representative, industrialist
- Spouse: Arnapurna Rath
- Children: Ashalata Mishra
- Parent(s): Lambodara Mohapatra (father by birth), Digambara Rath (father by adoption)
- Awards: O.B.E. (Order of British Empire)

Sashibhusan Rath (1885-1943) was a social reformer, industrialist, politician and founder-cum-editor of the Dainik ASHA newspaper (The first Odia daily), published from Brahmapur. He is famously known as Ganjam Byaghra which means The Tiger of Ganjam.

== Early life ==
Sashibhusan was born in Sorada, Ganjam district of Odisha. Sashi was the second son of Lambodara Mohapatra by birth. He was adopted by his paternal uncle Digambar Rath on the advice of Nilakantha Mohapatra (his grandfather). So, from his early days, he used Rath as his surname.

He completed his upper primary education from Russelkonda Board School of Bhanjanagar. He was homesick while spending his days over there. Once, he even ran away from there and arrived in Sorada by walking 30 km from Bhanjanagar. In his early years he went against the social malpractices of untouchability and animal sacrifice. He completed his matriculation from Higher Secondary School of Paralakhemundi.

== Career ==
After completing his matriculation in 1902, he went to Bombay and started a shoe company named Rath & Co. He became fluent in Gujarati while staying there. He made a friendship with a foreigner who introduced him to journalism while he was an assistant editor at Bombay Chronicles. Thereafter he moved to Pune and worked in a leather industry where he learnt skinning. But he could not stay there long due to his health ailments and had to come back Odisha. For sometime he worked in Utkal Tannery of Madhusudan Das as a manager, but then left for Kolkata where he joined a medicine company named Young & Co. as manager. There he made an Odia association and organized the Odias for a separate province.

On the advice of Nilamani Vidyaratna, he started publishing Asha weekly from 1913. In 1928, he started publishing it daily as Dainik Asha from Brahmapur, Odisha on the Odia New Year's Day (Mesha Sankranti). It was the first Odia daily newspaper at that time. It had helped the people of Odisha to launch their struggle to secure the unification of the outlying Odia areas under one administration and spread the message of freedom movement of the country in the rural areas of the State. The Asha press also gave the opportunity to receive the practical training in daily newspaper work and journalism. After the publication of Dainik Asha, Sashibhusan also published an English weekly called The East Coast and entrusted its editorship to Pandit Godabarish Misra.

He was elected as vice-chairman of the former Berhampur Municipality and later elected as Public Representative from the Ganjam district to Madras Legislative Council during the British Raj. He also worked extensively to eliminate animal sacrifice practices in Ganjam.

On 5 May 1933 the first English daily of Odisha, The New Orissa started publishing from the Asha press under the Editorship of Sashibhusan assisted by Mr. Sharma and Mr. K.N. Acharya who came from Madras. Mr. Acharya who was the colleague of Mr. Rath later became the Editor of New Orissa. The management of the paper was looked after by Mr. Hadu Raiguru who was a trusted Assistant and colleague of Mr. Rath. Sharat Mohapatra, a brother of Sashibhusan was an Asst. Editor in Dainik Asha who later became the Editor of weekly Asha and continued it for a long time even after the death of Mr. Rath.

As Sashibhusan was covering the news about civil disobedience and Salt Satyagraha regularly and abetted the salt satyagraha in Ganjam district he was arrested in 1930 but was released in 1931. In 1936, a book Kali Bhagabat written by Abhiram Paramhansha was printed in his Asha Press which has a nationalistic tone to it. The book was therefore proscribed and its author was arrested. In this case Sashibhusan also became a co-accused for which he had to spend a lot of money for legal expenses.

For the proper growth and development of Odia language and literature, necessity for the invention of Odia typewriter was greatly felt and a brother of Sashibhusan named Ranganath Mohapatra of Sorada, Ganjam district invented the Odia typewriter in early forties. The typewriters were manufactured in Germany and were put to use in some of the offices soon after the formation of the separate Orissa Province. The Zamindars of Ganjam and the Rajas of some of Garjats were encouraged to use the Odia typewriter.

Though his newspaper regularly covered the matters pertaining to freedom struggle he however fell ill after 1936 for which he could not keep himself in active politics. He died on 20 March 1943 at the age of 58 only.

== Legacy ==
Government Sashi Bhusan High School of Sorada and Sashi Bhusan Rath Govt. Autonomous Women's College in Brahmapur are named after him.
