= Alladigam =

Alladigam (also spelled Aladigam, Alladigaon and Aladigan) is a village in Ganjam District in the Indian state of Odisha.

== Geography ==
Alladigam is located at 19.52°N 84.88°E. It has an average elevation of 19 metres (62 ft). Total geographical area of Aladigan village is 5.8 km2 (577 hectares) and it is the 6th biggest village by area in the sub-district Purusottampur.

== Demographics ==
According to the 2011 India census, Alladigam had a population of 2500. There are 900 houses in this village. The village is situated on the bay of Rushikulya River. There are two schools, on established in 1921 and the other in 2008. There is a (Amba Tota) Mango tree here, which is called Chaitanya Matha. Odia (formerly known as oriya) is the local language here.

== Temples ==
It has some very old temples. Maa Thakurani Temple in middle of the village, Two Radha Krishna Temple, One Panchatatwa Which is situated in Amba tota at Balisahi.

== Post Office ==
The village has a post office; the pin code of Aladigam village is 761019. Barapalli & Bhuanbhuin villages also have this Post office and postal head office is Pratapur (Ganjam).

== Nearest Town & Villages ==
Purusottampur is nearest town to Aladigan which is approximately 10 km away. Purusottampur is the Block, Tahasil, Thana & Court of this village. The village comes under Kamanali - panchayat. Nearest Villages of the village are Barapalli, Bhuanbhuin, Balia, Rampali, K. N. Pur, Badamadhapur, Umburi, Khatia, Goba, Rangamatia, Raipur, Kanthiapalli, Chhotabasa, Pratapur etc.

== Map ==
- Google maps.in: Map of Alladigam
