= Nilamani Bisoyi =

Indian politician

Member of the Odisha Legislative Assembly
- Incumbent
- Assumed office 4 June 2024
- Preceded by: Purna Chandra Swain
- Constituency: Surada

Personal details
- Party: Bharatiya Janata Party
- Profession: Politician

Nilamani Bisoyi is an Indian politician. He was elected to the Odisha Legislative Assembly from 2024, representing Surada as a member of the Bharatiya Janata Party.
