= Nandini Devi =

Indian politician

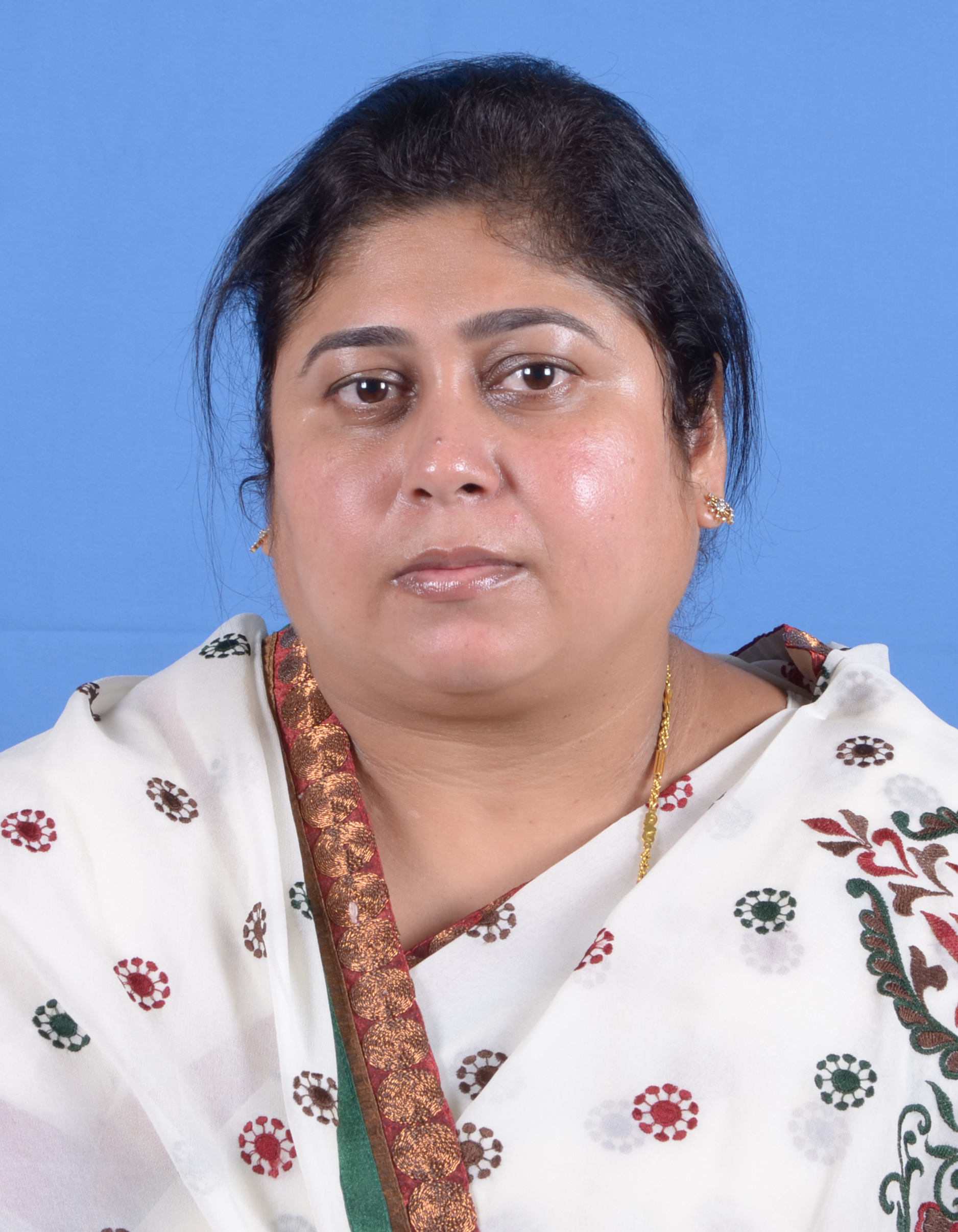

Member of Odisha Legislative Assembly
- Preceded by: Ramesh Chandra Jena
- Succeeded by: Ramesh Chandra Jena
- Constituency: Sanakhemundi Assembly constituency

Personal details
- Spouse: Kishore Chandra Singh Deo
- Relations: Ananta Narayan Singh Deo (father-in-law) and Shanti Devi (mother-in-law)
- Children: Gitanjali Devi

Nandini Devi is an Indian politician who served as Member of Odisha Legislative Assembly from Sanakhemundi Assembly constituency. In 2014 Odisha Legislative Assembly election, she beat Ramesh Chandra Jena with 47.90% or 61,773 votes. She was the runner up for 2019 Odisha Legislative Assembly election.

== Personal life ==
She is from royal family of Dharakote. Her daughter, Gitanjali Devi is the youngest block chairman in Ganjam district. Her husband Kishore Chandra Singh Deo, her father-in-law Ananta Narayan Singh Deo and her mother-in-law Shanti Devi have been elected to state assembly several times from 1967.
