= Rajarsitulyakula =

Indian dynasty

Rajarsitulyakula of Arang
- 4th century-5th century (Vassal of the Gupta Empire); 5th century-6th century (Independent kingdom)
- Capital: Arang
- Religion: Hinduism
- Government: Monarchy
- History
  - Established: 4th century
  - Disestablished: 6th century
| Preceded by | Succeeded by |
| Gupta Empire; Vakataka dynasty | Parvatadvaraka dynasty; Nala dynasty |
- Today part of: India

Rajarsitulyakula was a royal house that controlled Dakshina Kosala in India. They were also known as the Sura dynasty and were succeeded by the Parvatadvarkas.

== History ==
South Kosala had been in control of the Vakatakas for almost 60 years. After the death of Harishena, the last Vakataka king, South Kosala went into the hands of the regional Rajarsitulyakula. Their capital was located at Arang. The founder of the Rajarsitulyakula dynasty was Sura. This dynasty flourished in the 6th or 5th century.

The rulers used the Gupta Samvat or calendar, which shows that the rulers of this dynasty accepted the Gupta authority. 2 coins of the Gupta rulers have been found here, of Samudragupta and Kumaragupta I. Maharaja Bhimasena II issued the Arang copper plate inscription through which we get to know about the rulers of the dynasty. V. V. Mirashi identifies Bhimasena as the enemy of Skandavarman Nala. Skandavarman perhaps occupied their territory about 500 A.D.

The Rajarsitulyak was succeeded by the Parvatadvarkas.

== List of rulers ==
The known Rajarsitulyakula rulers are-

- Maharaja Sura
- Maharaja Dayita I alias Dayitavarman I
- Maharaja Bhimasena I
- Maharaja Dayitavarman II
- Maharaja Bhimasena II (c. 501 or 601–?)

== Bibliography ==
- "Detail History of Orissa". Government of Odisha. Archived from the original on 12 November 2006.
- Misra, Om Prakash (2003). Archaeological Excavations in Central India: Madhya Pradesh and Chhattisgarh. Mittal Publications. ISBN 978-81-7099-874-7.
- "छत्तीसगढ़ के स्थानीय राजवंश भाग 1 ( राजर्षि तुल्य कुल वंश)". Apex Study.
- Patnaik, Jeeban Kumar. "Temples of South Kosala 6th century A D 11th century A D a case study of stellate temples-Chapter II: Historical background of South Kosala" (PDF). Shodaganga Inflibnet.
