= Danda Nata =

Dance festival in Odisha, India

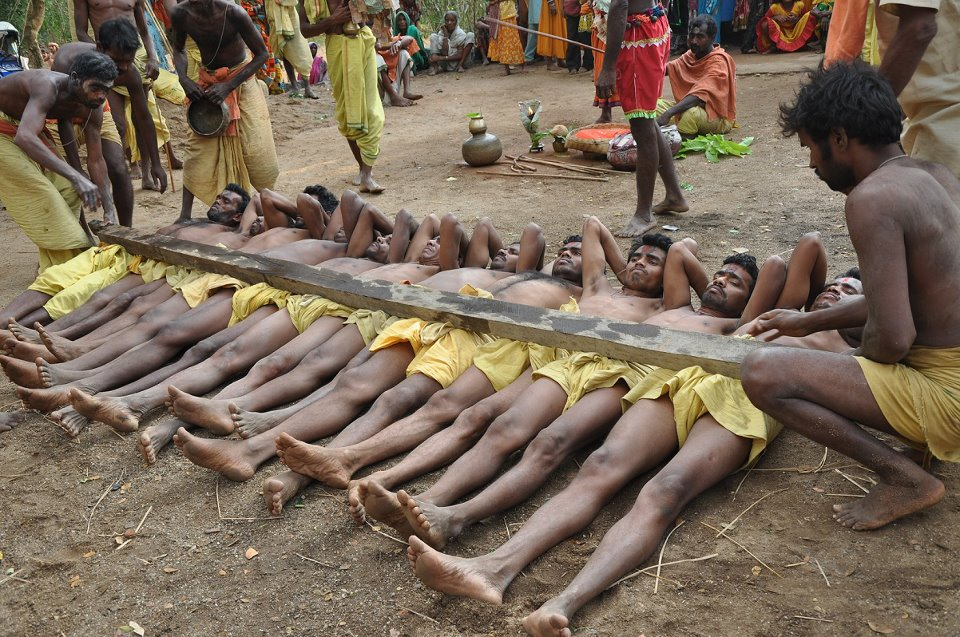
Danda Nacha

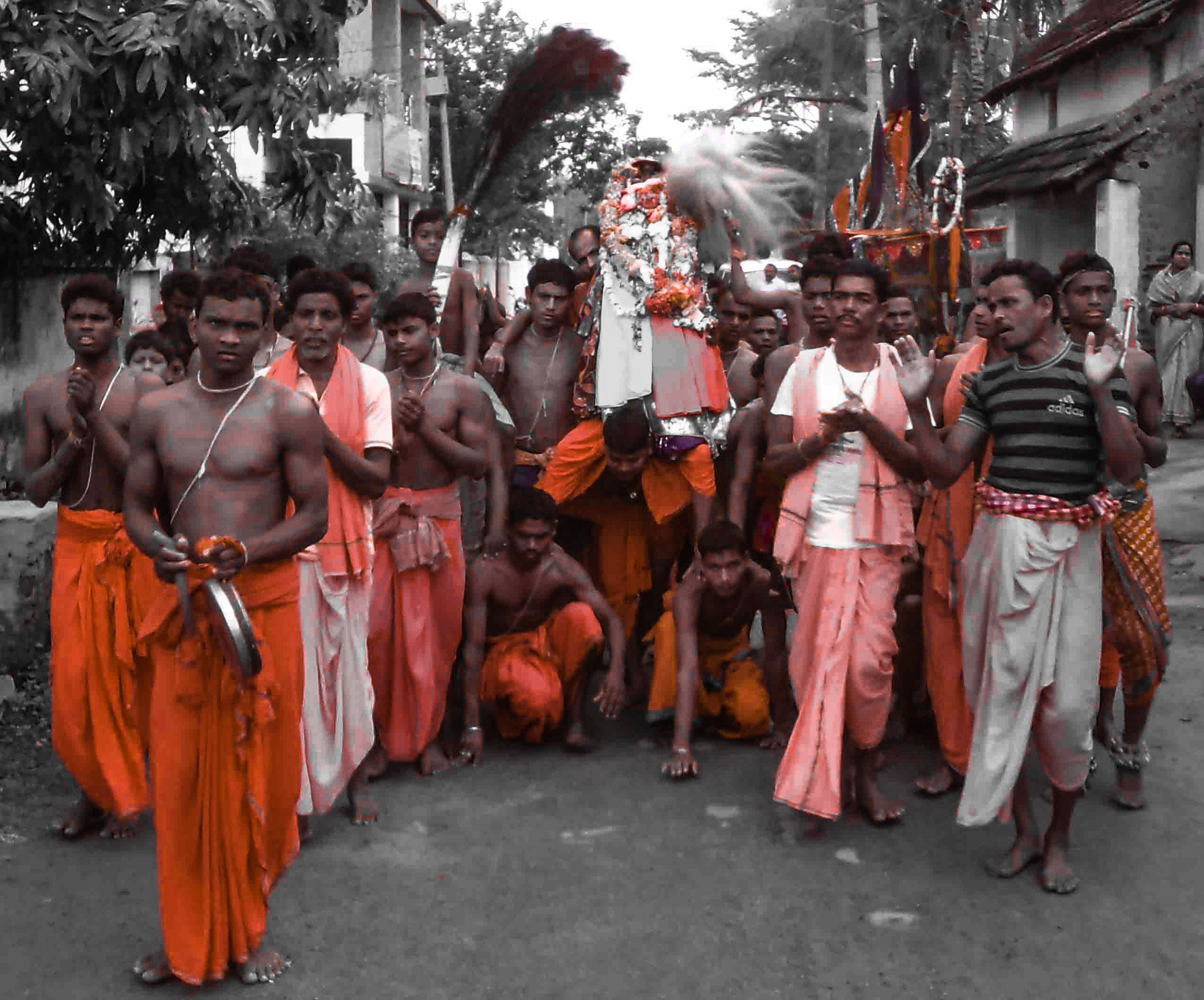
Another picture of Danda nritya

Danda Naata, also written as Danda Jatra and Danda Yatra (Odia: ଦଣ୍ଡ ନାଟ, ଦଣ୍ଡ ଯାତ୍ରା) is one of the most important traditional dance festivals organized in different parts of South Odisha and particularly in the Ganjam District, Kandhamal District,Dhenkanal District & Angul District the heartland of ancient Kalinga Empire. The Danda Naata festival is being held in the month of Chaitra of every year. As per Ram Prasad Tripathy's article, it is an ancient festival of the Kalinga kingdom and still alive in and around the ancient Kalinga capital Sampa or Samapa i.e modern day Jaugada of Ganjam district. The Participants of Danda are called Danduas (also known as Bhoktas) and they pray Goddesses Kali and Shiva during this 13-, 18- or 21-day Danda period.

Danda begins on an auspicious day before the Chaitra Sankranti or Meru Parba with traditional worship and fasting. The total number of days for the festival is 13, 18 or 21 days. Only male persons take part in this festival. The participants are known as the 'Bhoktas'. All the `Bhoktas` or 'Danduas' lead a very pious life for all these days during the festival and they avoid eating meat, fish or cohabiting during this period.

It is believed that the present day Danda Naata is a part of the ancient Chaitra Yatra festivals being celebrated every year at Tara Tarini Shakti Peetha. The Kalinga Emperors organised this Chaitra festival for their Ista devi, Tara Tarini. As per folk lore, during ancient period after 20 days of Danda practice the Danduas must assemble near Tara Tarini Shakti/Tantra Peetha (which is Ista devi of the Great Kalinga rulers) and with some hard rituals culminate their Danda on the last day.

This practice continued for many years and Chaitra Yatra which is still celebrated at Tara Tarini Shakti Peetha in the month of Chaitra, is also another part of that old tradition. But later this Danda Naata spread to different parts of Utkala and Koshala. Now the old tradition was changed. Danda Naata groups increased abnormally and the Danduas culminating their Danda in their own villages or locality instead of Tara Tarini Shakti/Tantra Peetha.

== Etymology ==
Danda has various meanings, but there are two main meanings of the word

1. Club, Rod, Pole, Stick, Staff, Sceptre
2. Punishment, Chastisement

The term Naata comes from the word Natya, which gives many different denotations of music, dance and drama. The term Jatra means theatre.

=== Folktale of the origin of the word danda ===
Lord Ganesh was being taught a dance by his father, Lord Shiva. It was a religious dance called Tandava Nritya. In the process of learning the dance, Lord Shiva kicked the stage he was on, and made a sound that sounded like the word "Dan". Then a piece of brass material broke off the chain which Lord Shiva was wearing around his ankle and fell on a percussion instrument known as Mardala. The brass material hitting the Mardala made a very loud "Da" noise. Those two sounds were put together to form the word Danda. Danda came to be associated with dance because of that episode.

== Danda Naata Ceremony ==
Danda Naata is an Indian dance festival that originated in the Ganjam district of Odisha. Danda Naata is a form of a religious festival that has theatrical and dance components. The dance is done mainly to worship Lord Shiva, the God of destruction of the Hindu mythology. There are other Gods and Goddesses that are worshiped by the spiritual dance also, such as Krishna, Ganesh, Kali, and Durga amongst others. The low caste Hindus and the high caste, such as the Brahmins, all participated in the Danda Naata. The dance along with the accompanying events is performed over the course of three months March, April, and May. Some events are performed in March – April, the month of Chaitra, and other events are performed in April – May, the month of Vaishakha.

People commit self- inflicted wounds to worship Lord Shiva because the philosophy of ancient Hindu says that for a person to be great, one has to have self-control over one's body (Kaya), mind (Mana), and speech (Vakya).

So in order to achieve greatness, a lot of punishments, Danda, to the individual must be undergone, so this event is known as Danda Naata.

=== Dance component of the religious festival ===
Danda Naata consists of multiple dances. People start Danda by fasting, having a single meal a day made up of rice and dal, and worshipping their Lord before the actual dances occur. This dance consists of a series of dances which are performed one after another by the male members belonging to the Scheduled Castes and other backward castes. In this dance the Ghasis provide the music with the help of Dhol and Mahuri. The dance has a rich repertory. Parva dance is the first item of the repertory. The Prabhakar and the Prabhakariani, dressed in multi coloured dress, dance in the beginning. The dancer places a piece of cloth on his shoulders and holds the ends of the same in front with both the hands. He moves his hands forward and backward, right and left, to the rhythm of the dance. A semi-circular plate, made of bamboo sticks and covered with coloured and decorated cloth with ornamental border, is tied to the back of the Prabhkar. The Prabhakar wears multi coloured skirt and jacket. The Prabhakariani, a male in female role, dresses himself in sari and kanchala (blouse). The Prabhakariani holds a piece of coloured handkerchief in his hand. After the Parava dance is over the Hara –Parvati dance begins. Then a group dance of Fakir and Fakiriani is performed. The dances of Savara and Savarani, Chadeya and Chadouni, are performed one after another. Then the party performs a leela based on a story from the Ramayana or the Mahabharata or from any other Puran through songs and dances . Patarasaura and Patarasaurani perform their dance at the end of the leela. The last, but not the least, is the Binakar who closes the performance with his most significant songs and dances. Then males that belong to backward and scheduled castes perform the Parava dance. In the Parava dance, the Prabhakar, male acting as a male, and the Prabhakariani, a male acting as a female, begin the dance in multi – colored clothing. A piece of cloth is placed on the shoulders of dancers. The cloth is held with both hands and the dancers move the cloth backwards and forwards and side to side according to the rhythm of the dance. Then immediately following that dance the Hara – Parvati is performed.

After those dances are performed, a host of other dances are performed. The Fakir and Fakiriani, a group dance, is performed first. Then the Savara and Savarani are performed with the Chadeya and Chadouni dances being performed directly after. Then everyone gets involved in the festivities by performing a leela through songs and dances, which is based on a story from various Purans. After the leela, the Patarasaura and Patarasaurani perform their traditional dance. Lastly, the Binakar ends the events through dances and songs.

==== The roles of the dancers ====
The various dances of the Danda Naata have various themes behind them. Each of the roles in the dances sing a different tune. Some songs are based on historical stories, while others have a more comical approach. Some groups use a question/answer approach. The groups that use that approach have one role, male or female role, ask questions, while the other role give answers to those replies. Although the songs can be performed through multiple approaches, all the songs have the same style, folk and Odissi.

=== Music ===
The music of the Danda Naata is different for different dances . The songs are of different tunes for different characters. The songs are mainly devotional and mostly based on stories from the epics. Humorous songs are sometimes sung by the dancers . sometimes they put questions in songs and their counterpart give the reply in songs. The songs are of folk and Odissi style. The dance originated from tribal dances, but has been much influenced by the Yatra and Pala performance of the state. Danda Naata is being gradually modernized in respect of music, dance, costume, style and make up. It is thereby losing its original simplicity and traditional characteristics.
