= Purna Chandra Swain =

Indian politician

Member of Odisha Legislative Assembly
- In office 2009–2024
- Preceded by: Kishore Chandra Singh Deo
- Constituency: Surada

Personal details
- Political party: Biju Janata Dal
- Profession: Politician

Purna Chandra Swain is an Indian politician from Odisha. He was a three time elected Member of the Odisha Legislative Assembly from 2009, 2014, and 2019, representing Surada Assembly constituency as a Member of the Biju Janata Dal.

== See also ==
- 2009 Odisha Legislative Assembly election
- Odisha Legislative Assembly
