= Daringbadi =

Daringbadi Daringabaadi
- Hill station
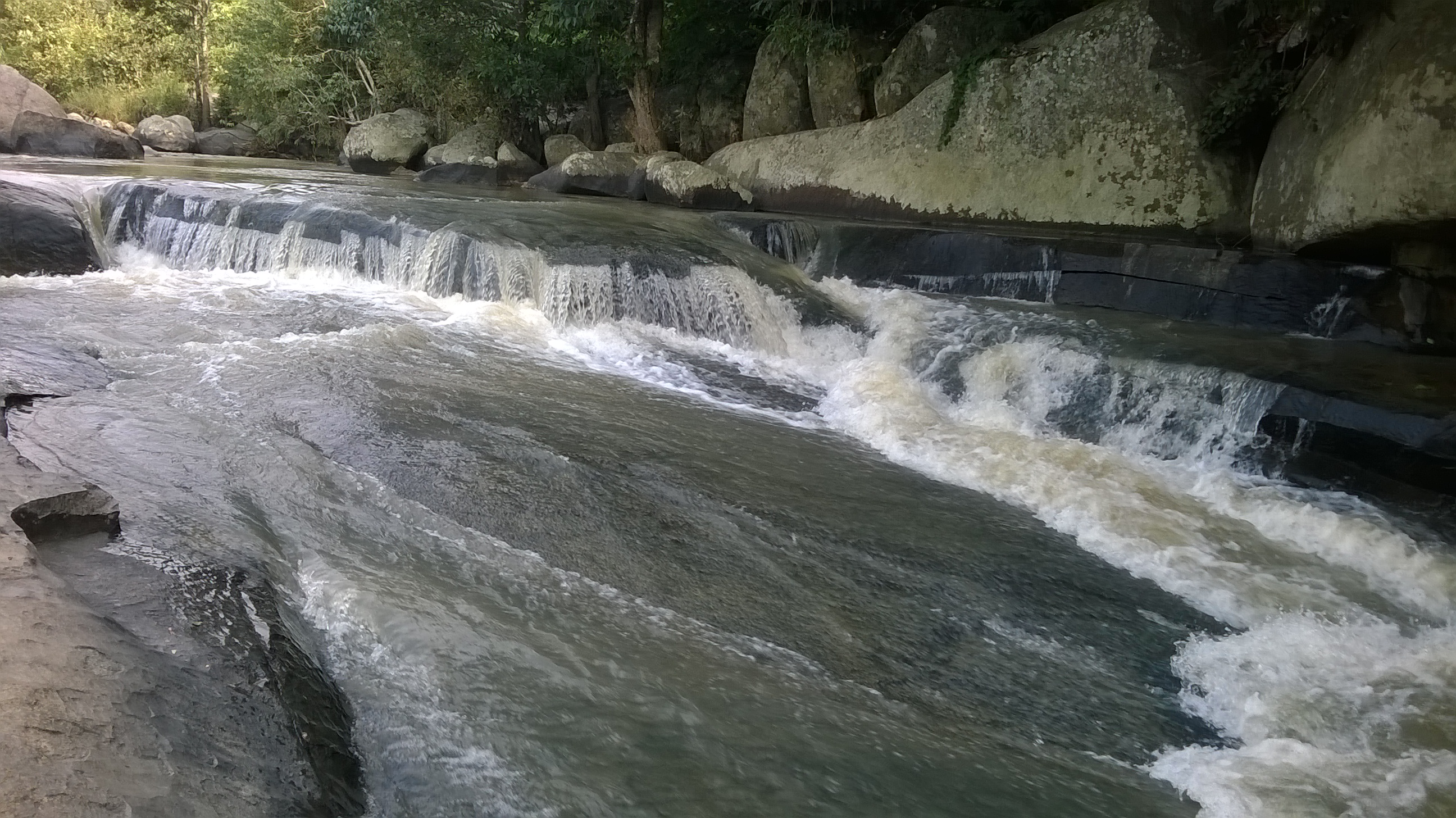
- Lovers point near Daringbadi

- Location in Odisha, India Daringbadi (India)
- Coordinates: 19°54′26″N 84°07′22″E
- Country: India
- State: Odisha
- District: Kandhmal
- Founder: Dering Saheb
- Elevation: 915 m (3,002 ft)

Population
  - Total: 6,996

Languages
  - Official: Odia
- Time zone: UTC+5:30 (IST)
- Postal code: 762104
- Telephone code: +91-6849
- Vehicle registration: OD-12
- Nearest city: Phulbani(105 km), Baliguda(49km), Berhampur (119 km), Surada (47km), Aska (84), Muniguda (142), Mohana (82km)

Daringbadi is a hill station in Kandhmal district of Odisha state in eastern India. It is situated at an elevation of 915 metres and is a popular tourist destination.

Back in the days of the British rule, there was a British officer named Daring Saheb who was in charge of this place. Over the years, this place was named after him, which spelled Daringbadi with Badi meaning village. More than 50% of the population here constitutes Scheduled Tribes, community of aboriginal tribal races.

The temperature level of Daringbadi has often been recorded below 0 °C. It is famous for its production of superior quality, G.I. certified organic turmeric. It is also famous for ginger harvesting.

== Travel ==
Daringbadi can be reached from Bhubaneswar (246 km), the state capital by regular bus services. The nearest railway station is at Brahmapur (119 km).

Daringbadi can be reached from Brahmapur either via Sorada (NH-59) which is near about 120 kilometres (75 mi), or via Bhanjanagar - G.Udayagiri (NH-117) which is around 180 kilometres (110 mi) or via Mohana-Bramhanigan route which is around 145 kilometres (90 mi).

It is about 105 kilometres (65 mi) from district headquarter Phulbani, 49 kilometres (30 mi) from Balliguda and 30.5 kilometres (19.0 mi) from Raikia.
