= Ramesh Jena =

Indian politician (born 1940)

Sri Ramesh Chandra Jena

MLA: 11th Odisha Vidhan Sabha
- In office 1995–2000
- Preceded by: Adwita Prasad Singh
- Succeeded by: Adwita Prasad Singh
- Constituency: Angul

Personal details
- Born: 2 November 1940 (age 86) Kulad, Angul
- Died: 23 December 2023
- Citizenship: Indian
- Party: Indian National Congress
- Parent: Sudhakar Jena (Father) Sukumari Jena (Mother)
- Relatives: Ashmit Jena (Grandson)
- Occupation: Politician

Ramesh Chandra Jena (1940-2023) was a senior leader of Indian National Congress and a former member of the Odisha Legislative Assembly. He was the Mla of Angul Legislative Assembly from 1995 to 2000 and also served as the General Secretary of District Congress Committee. He was the Working President of INTUC Angul between 1980's to 1995. He also laid the foundation of the Rajiv Gandhi Smruti Pitha in Angul in memory of Sri Rajiv Gandhi after his assassination.

== Early Life ==
Sri Jena was born on 02 November 1940 in the serene village of Kulad and was the eldest son of Sudhakar Jena and Sukumari Jena. From early age he exhibited exceptional leadership and strong sense of community welfare. His education journey began from local school of Kulad and Balram Prasad school

Sri Jena graduated in law with distinction and began his career with Coal India before joining Odisha Police as Sub-Inspector. His dedication and integrity earned his the position in Central Bureau of Investigation. But the hardship faced by many farmers in Kulad forced him to resign and start his political career.

He with the help of the then Chief Minister of Odisha Smt.Nandini Satpathy mobilised local farmer needs and supply and successfully created an irrigational canal. Under his leadership initiatives like access to education, water supply and electricity supply to all which changed their lives forever. His instrumental role in implementing tribal reservation policies in Nalco ensured that marginalized communities had a share in the region's industrial growth.

== Political Career ==
Sri Jena's political career begin as he served as the Secretary of Nandini Sapathy during her tenure as Chief Minister. His charisma, organisational skill and deep understanding of people's issues gained him the trust of senior Congress leaders like the then Chief Minister Sri Janaki Ballabh Patnaik and Honorary Brigadier Sri Kamakhya Prasad Singh Deo. Elected as the Member of Legislative Assembly of Angul, he championed industrialization, employment and tribal welfare. Sri Jena played a key role in establishment of Nalco in Angul. In 1982 he laid the foundation to the "Nalco Shramik Congress Union" and Nalco Karmachari Sangha. He also served as the Working President of INTUC between 1980's to 1995. He extended his leadership to cooperative sectors and holding key positions in institutions like the Odisha State Cooperative Bank(OSCB). Sri Jena represented India in cooperative conferences across Europe, Asia and North America bringing global insights to Odisha's cooperative sector.

ସୋନିଆ ଗାନ୍ଧୀ ଓ କଂଗ୍ରେସ

ଲେଖକ ପରିଚୟ

Author of ସୋନିଆ ଗାନ୍ଧୀ ଓ କଂଗ୍ରେସ.
