= Sheragada =

Census town in Odisha, India

- Census town
- Location in Odisha, India Sheragada (India)
- Coordinates: 19.5130°N 84.6038°E
- Country: India
- State: Odisha
- District: Ganjam
- Named for: The Lion Fort

Government
  - Type: Gram Panchayat
  - Body: Sheragada Grampanchayat
  - Member of Legislative Assembly: Naveen Patnaik (BJD)
  - Member of Parliament: Anita Subhadarshini (BJP)
- Elevation: 27 m (89 ft)

Languages
  - Official: Odia, English
- Time zone: UTC+5:30 (IST)
- PIN: 761106
- STD Telephone code: 06822
- Vehicle registration: OD-07 (Old OR-07)
- Block: Sheragada
- Odisha Legislative Assembly Constituency: Hinjili
- Lok Sabha Constituency: Aska

Sheragada is a census town in Ganjam district in the Indian state of Odisha.

== Geography ==
Sheragada is located at 19.5130°N 84.6038°E. It has an average elevation of 27 m (89 ft).

== History ==
The name Sheragada is a combination of two words Sher (lion) & Gada (fort) which literally means The Fort of Lion. This place was earlier under Khindirisrunga (ଖିଣ୍ଡିରିଶୃଙ୍ଗ) or Khidisingi (ଖିଡ଼ିସିଙ୍ଗି) Mandala which comprised present day Sorada, Dharakot, Sheragada blocks of Ganjam district (also includes some parts of Mohana block of Gajapati district). In 1476, Raja Baliar Singh divided the Khidisingi kingdom into four different estates due to the early demise of his elder son. Sheragada went to his youngest son, Raja Parsuram Singh.

- Badagada – Raja Daman Singh (Baliar Singh's grandson from his eldest son)
- Dharakot – Raja Hadu Singh
- Sorada – Raja Sandhadhanu Singh (also known as Abhaya Pratap)
- Sheragada – Raja Parsuram Singh (Minor) (Represented by Raja Baliar himself).

After the British annexation of Ganjam, Sheragada Zamindari started being administered by Madras Presidency which is mentioned in List of zamindari estates in the Madras Presidency. In 1936, Sheragada merged with Orissa Province along with other Odia spoken areas of Ganjam. After the independence of India, it was administered by Odisha state.

== Educational Institutions ==
- Udaya Pratap Science College
- Govt. ITI
- Odisha Adarsha Vidyalaya, Bhusunda
- Mahatma Gandhi High School
- Sripada Manjari Nodal (Govt.) Girl's High School
- Sanskrit Bidyalaya
- Boy's (Ex-Board) Primary School
- Ramachandi Primary School
- Bali Sahi Primary School
- Sitala Primary School
- Totasahi Primary School
- Ambedkar Primary School
- Vivekananda Sishu Vidya Mandir
- Saraswati Sishu Vidya Niketan
- Millenium Public School
- Mother's Public School

== Religious Places ==
- Sri Jagannath Mandir
- Nrushingha Mandir
- Mahadev Mandir
- Gopinath Mandir
- Maa Ranabahuti Mandir
- Maa Sitala Mandir
- Dakhinakali Mandir
- Maa Santoshi Mandir
- Ramachandi Mandir
- Lakshmi Narayan Mandir
- Hanuman Mandir
- Hareswar Mandir
- Gundicha Mandir
- Maa Jaya Chandi Mandir
- Maa Manikeswari Mandir

== Healthcare ==
- Community Health Center (CHC), Sheragada
- Government Veterinary Hospital, Sheragada

== Financial Institutions/Banks ==
- State Bank of India
- Punjab National Bank
- Union Bank of India
- Odisha State Co-operative Bank
- Aska Co-operative Central Bank Ltd.

== Transport ==
=== Road ===
Sheragada is situated in the intersection of NH-326 (Asika – Chinturu) and SH-36 which connect Sheragada to other cities and towns of Odisha. The three-wheeler auto taxies and buses are the most important mode of transportation in this town.

The commercial capital of Southern Odisha, Brahmapur is about 40 kms from Sheragada while Asika & Digapahandi is about 17 kms.

=== Rail ===
- Brahmapur railway station

=== Air ===
- Biju Patnaik Airport
- Brahmapur Airport

=== Port ===
- Gopalpur port

== Politics ==
Sheragada comes under the Hinjili Assembly Constituency. Current MLA from Hinjili Assembly Constituency is Naveen Patnaik of BJD, the Chief Minister of Odisha who won the seat in State elections of 2014 and also in 2000, 2004 and 2009. Previous MLAs from this seat were Udayanath Nayak of INC in 1995 and in 1985, Harihar Sahu of JD in 1990, and Brundaban Nayak who won in 1980 as JNP(SC) candidate and as an INC candidate in 1977.

Hinjili is part of Aska (Lok Sabha constituency).
