= Surada Assembly constituency =

Assembly constituency in Odisha

Coordinates: 19.76°N 84.43°E

Surada
- Constituency No. 129 for the Odisha Legislative Assembly
- Surada Assembly constituency in Ganjam district

Constituency details
- Country: India
- Region: East India
- State: Odisha
- Division: Southern Division
- District: Ganjam
- Lok Sabha constituency: Aska
- Established: 1952
- Total electors: 2,35,622 (Note: as on 2024) (Note: as data published by election commission)
- Reservation: None

Member of Legislative Assembly
- 17th Odisha Legislative Assembly
- Incumbent Nilamani Bisoyi
- Party: Bharatiya Janata Party
- Elected year: 2024

Surada is a Vidhan Sabha constituency of Ganjam district, Odisha.

Area of this constituency includes Sorada NAC, Belaguntha NAC, Sorada Block and Belaguntha Block.

== Elected members ==
Vote share of winning candidates
2024	54.71%
2019	50.29%
2014	49.25%
2009	40.41%
2004	56.94%
2000	50.17%
1995	31.77%
1990	57.41%
1985	55.15%
1980	46.41%
1977	56.52%

Since its formation in 1952, 17 elections were held till date.

List of members elected from Surada constituency are:

Year	Member	Party
Part of Russelkonda Constituency
1952	Dinabandhu Behera	Indian National Congress
As Suruda constituency
1957	Biju Patnaik	Indian National Congress
1961	Arjun Naik	Indian National Congress
1967	Ananta Narayan Singh Deo	Swatantra Party
1971	Ananta Narayan Singh Deo	Swatantra Party
1974	Sarat Chandra Panda	Indian National Congress
1977	Ananta Narayan Singh Deo	Janata Party
1980	Gantayat Swain	Indian National Congress (I)
1985	Sarat Chandra Panda	Indian National Congress
1990	Shanti Devi	Janata Dal
1995	Ananta Narayan Singh Deo	Bharatiya Janata Party
2000	Usha Rani Panda	Indian National Congress
2004	Kishore Chandra Singh Deo	Bharatiya Janata Party
As Surada constituency
2009	Purna Chandra Swain	Biju Janata Dal
2014	Purna Chandra Swain	Biju Janata Dal
2019	Purna Chandra Swain	Biju Janata Dal
2024	Nilamani Bisoyi	Bharatiya Janata Party

== Election results ==
=== 2024 ===
Voting were held on 20 May 2024 in 2nd phase of Odisha Assembly Election & 5th phase of Indian General Election. Counting of votes was on 4 June 2024. In 2024 election, Bharatiya Janata Party candidate Nilamani Bisoyi defeated Biju Janata Dal candidate Sanghamitra Swain by a margin of 28,224 votes.

2024 Odisha Vidhan Sabha Election, Surada
Party	Candidate	Votes	%	±%
BJP	Nilamani Bisoyi	83,625	54.71	▲13.62
BJD	Sanghamitra Swain	55,401	36.25	▼14.04
INC	Hari Krishna Rath	7,478	4.89	▲0.10
NOTA	None of the above	2,488	1.63	
Majority		28,224	18.46	
Turnout		1,52,847	64.87	
BJP gain from BJD				

=== 2019 ===
In 2019 election, Biju Janata Dal candidate Purna Chandra Swain defeated Bharatiya Janata Party candidate Nilamani Bisoyi by a margin of 13,996 votes.

2019 Odisha Legislative Assembly election: Surada
Party	Candidate	Votes	%	±%
BJD	Purna Chandra Swain	76,501	50.29	
BJP	Nilamani Bisoyi	62,505	41.09	
INC	Sangram Keshari Mohanty	7,293	4.79	
NOTA	None of the above	2,885	1.9	
Majority		13,996	9.2	
Turnout		1,52,132	67.9	
BJD hold				

=== 2014 ===
In 2014 election, Biju Janata Dal candidate Purna Chandra Swain defeated Indian National Congress candidate Basanta Kumar Bisoyi by a margin of 16,000 votes.

2014 Vidhan Sabha Election, Surada
Party	Candidate	Votes	%	±%
BJD	Purna Chandra Swain	67,546	49.25	▲8.84
INC	Basanta Kumar Bisoyi	51,546	37.58	▲27.77
BJP	Bhagabana Panda	9,270	6.76	▼0.53
NOTA	None of the above	2,745	2.0	−
Majority		16,000	11.67	▲7.93
Turnout		1,37,148	66.66	▲8.95
Registered electors		2,05,743		
BJD hold				

=== 2009 ===
In 2009 election, Biju Janata Dal candidate Purna Chandra Swain defeated Independent candidate Nilamani Bisoyi by a margin of 4,011 votes.

2009 Vidhan Sabha Election, Surada
Party	Candidate	Votes	%	±%
BJD	Purna Chandra Swain	43,299	40.41	−
Independent	Nilamani Bisoyi	39,288	36.66	−
INC	Syed Mubarak	10,517	9.81	−
BJP	Barat Dandpani Patro	7,811	7.29	−
Majority		4,011	3.74 (Note: % of total valid votes)	−
Turnout		1,07,182	57.71	−
BJD gain from BJP				
