= Sorada =

Town in Odisha, India

Sorada Surada
- Town
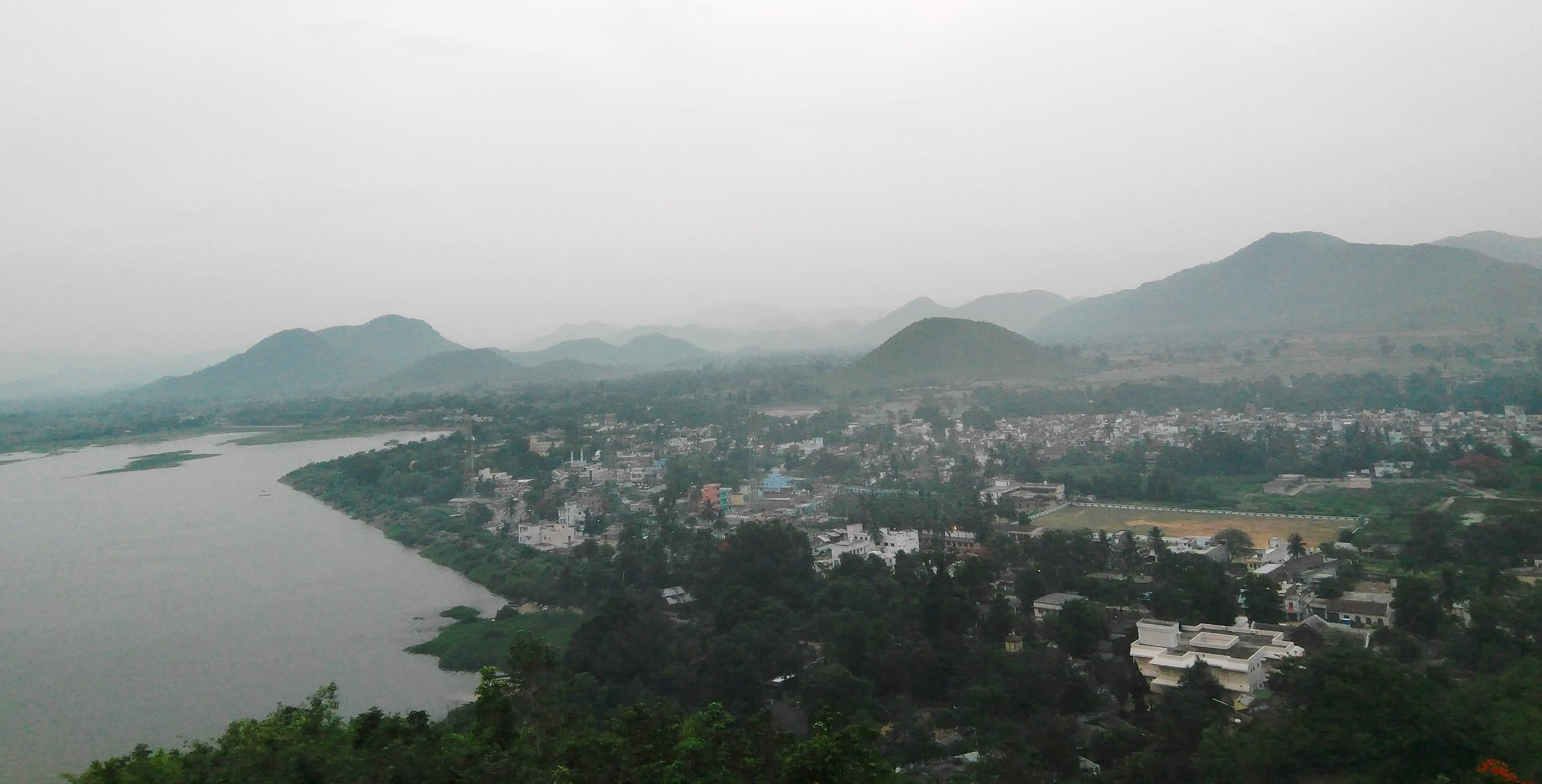
- Skyline of Sorada
- Nickname: SRD
- Location in Odisha, India Sorada (India)
- Coordinates: 19.761959°N 84.438332°E
- Country: India
- State: Odisha
- District: Ganjam
- First settled: 1476
- Founder: King Sandhadhanu Singh (Abhaya Pratap)

Government
  - Type: Notified Area Council (N.A.C.)
  - Body: Sorada N.A.C.
  - N.A.C. Chairman: Sibasankar Panda (BJD)
  - Executive Officer: Umesh Chandra Sahu
  - Member of Legislative Assembly: Nilamani Bisoyi (BJP)
  - Member of Parliament: Anita Subhadarshini (BJP)

Area
  - Total: 15.15 km^{2} (5.85 sq mi)
- Elevation: 84 m (276 ft)

Population (2011)
  - Total: 14,867
  - Density: 981.3/km^{2} (2,542/sq mi)

Languages
  - Official: Odia, English
- Time zone: UTC+5:30 (IST)
- PIN: 761108
- STD Telephone code: 06819
- Vehicle registration: OD-32 (Old OR-07/OD-07)
- Sub-division: Bhanjanagar
- Block: Sorada
- Odisha Legislative Assembly Constituency: Surada
- Lok Sabha Constituency: Aska
- Website: sujogportal.odisha.gov.in/surada/

Sorada (formerly Surada) is a town and a Notified Area Council in Ganjam district in the Indian state of Odisha.

== Geography ==
Sorada is located at 19.76°N 84.43°E. It has an average elevation of 84 m (276 ft).

It is situated at the North-Western border of Ganjam district on the confluence of rivers Rushikulya and Jarau, bounded by Dharakot, Belaguntha, Bhanjanagar of Ganjam district and Daringibadi, Raikia of Kandhamal district.

== Etymology ==
In Sanskrit roots, the word Surada is a combination of two Sanskrit words i.e Sura (devas) & Adda (place) which means Place of the Devas or The Bestower of Ambrosia/Nectar. Later by time Surada became Sorada.

== History ==
According to the Census Report of T.J. Maltby of 1880, the Khindirisrunga (ଖିଣ୍ଡିରିଶୃଙ୍ଗ) or Khidisingi (ଖିଡ଼ିସିଙ୍ଗି) estate was established by Raja Sobha Chandra Singh of Sabeijaipur in 1168 which comprised present day Sorada, Dharakot, Sheragada blocks of Ganjam district (also includes some parts of Mohana block of Gajapati district). In 1476, Raja Baliar Singh divided Khidisingi into four different estates after the untimely demise of his eldest son. Sorada estate went to his third son, Raja Sandhadhanu Singh.

- Badagada – Raja Daman Singh (Baliar Singh's grandson from his eldest son)
- Dharakot – Raja Hadu Singh
- Sorada – Raja Sandhadhanu Singh (also known as Abhaya Pratap)
- Sheragada – Raja Parsuram Singh (Minor) (Represented by Raja Baliar himself).

When Britishers annexed over Ganjam, they put this zamindari under the administration of Madras Presidency which is mentioned in List of zamindari estates in Madras Presidency. Subsequently in 1836, Britishers auctioned and abolished the zamindari rights of Sorada along with Ghumusar over multiple mutiny and dues in tax payment. In 1936, Sorada became part of newly created Orissa Province and since the independence of India, it has been administered by the Odisha state.

== Demographics ==
As of 2011 India census, Sorada had a population of 14,867. Males constitute 51% of the population and females 49%. Sorada has an average literacy rate of 68.7%, lower than the national average of 74.04%: male literacy is 55.6%, and female literacy is 44.3%.

Religion in Sorada
| Hinduism | 93.04% |
| Islam | 1.68% |
| Christianity | 5.21% |
| Sikh | 0.00% |
| Buddhist | 0.01% |
| Jain | 0.01% |
| Not Stated | 0.05% |
| Other | 0.00% |

== Places of interest ==
Sorada is surrounded by lush green mountains and the confluence of rivers Rushikulya and Jarau. The town, which houses eight ancient Shiva temples, is known as Asta Sambhu Khetra, a title bestowed upon it for its auspiciousness. The oldest among them, Panchanan temple located on the riverbank, attracts visitors for both spiritual and recreational outings.

- Sorada Dam - The water reservoir was built in 1896. The water of Padma river locally known as Patma is reserved in it. The Odisha government has enhanced its appeal by developing Parks, jetty and a picnic spot in its surroundings. Nearby up in the Khunteswari hill provides panoramic views of the dam along with Sorada Town.
- Kantapidha Jatra - A famous annual celebration of Goddess Kandhuni Devi of Sorada spanning over the hindu months of Bhadrab & Ashwin.

== Notable people ==
- Sashibhusan Rath - Founder of DAINIK ASHA Newspaper, Social reformer, Public representative, Industrialist and Freedom fighter.

== Climate and regional setting ==
Maximum summer temperature is 37 °C; minimum winter temperature is 17 °C. The mean daily temperature varies from 33 °C to 38 °C. May is the hottest month; December is the coldest. The average annual rainfall is 1250 mm and the region receives monsoon and torrential rainfall from July to October.

Climate data for Surada, Odisha
| Month | Jan | Feb | Mar | Apr | May | Jun | Jul | Aug | Sep | Oct | Nov | Dec | Year |
|---|---|---|---|---|---|---|---|---|---|---|---|---|---|
| Mean daily maximum °C (°F) | 26 (79) | 29 (84) | 34 (93) | 36 (97) | 37 (99) | 34 (93) | 31 (88) | 30 (86) | 31 (88) | 31 (88) | 29 (84) | 27 (81) | 31 (88) |
| Mean daily minimum °C (°F) | 14 (57) | 18 (64) | 22 (72) | 26 (79) | 28 (82) | 28 (82) | 26 (79) | 26 (79) | 25 (77) | 22 (72) | 18 (64) | 14 (57) | 22 (72) |
| Average rainfall mm (inches) | 15.50 (0.61) | 17.40 (0.69) | 21.70 (0.85) | 21.00 (0.83) | 40.30 (1.59) | 156.00 (6.14) | 310.00 (12.20) | 294.50 (11.59) | 204.00 (8.03) | 96.10 (3.78) | 30.00 (1.18) | 18.60 (0.73) | 1,225.1 (48.22) |
Source: MSM Weather

== Education ==
- Rushikulya Degree College
- Keshab Panda Degree Women's College
- Odisha Adarsha Vidyalaya
- Rushikulya Higher Secondary School
- PCM Women's Higher Secondary School
- Binayak Public Higher Secondary School
- Rushikulya ITC
- Sashibhusan Govt. High School
- Govt. Girl's High School
- Technical High School
- Saraswati Sishu Vidya Mandir
- Vivekananda Sishu Vidya Mandir
- Modern Depaul Public School
- Pragati Public School

== Financial Institutions ==
- State Bank of India
- Punjab National Bank
- Union Bank of India
- Odisha Grameen Bank
- Axis Bank
- Aska Central Co-operative Bank Ltd

== Transportation ==
=== Road ===
Sorada is connected with National Highway 59 and State Highway 36 which connect all major places and towns of Odisha. Three-wheeler auto taxis are the most important mode of transportation in town.

== Politics ==
Sorada is a part of Surada Assembly Constituency. Current MLA from Surada Assembly Constituency is Nilamani Bisoyi of BJP, who won the seat in State general assembly election in 2024.

Biju Patnaik had elected from Suruda constituency in 1957 state elections.

Sorada is a part of Aska (Lok Sabha constituency).
