= Dharakot =

Dharakot Dharakotta
- Village
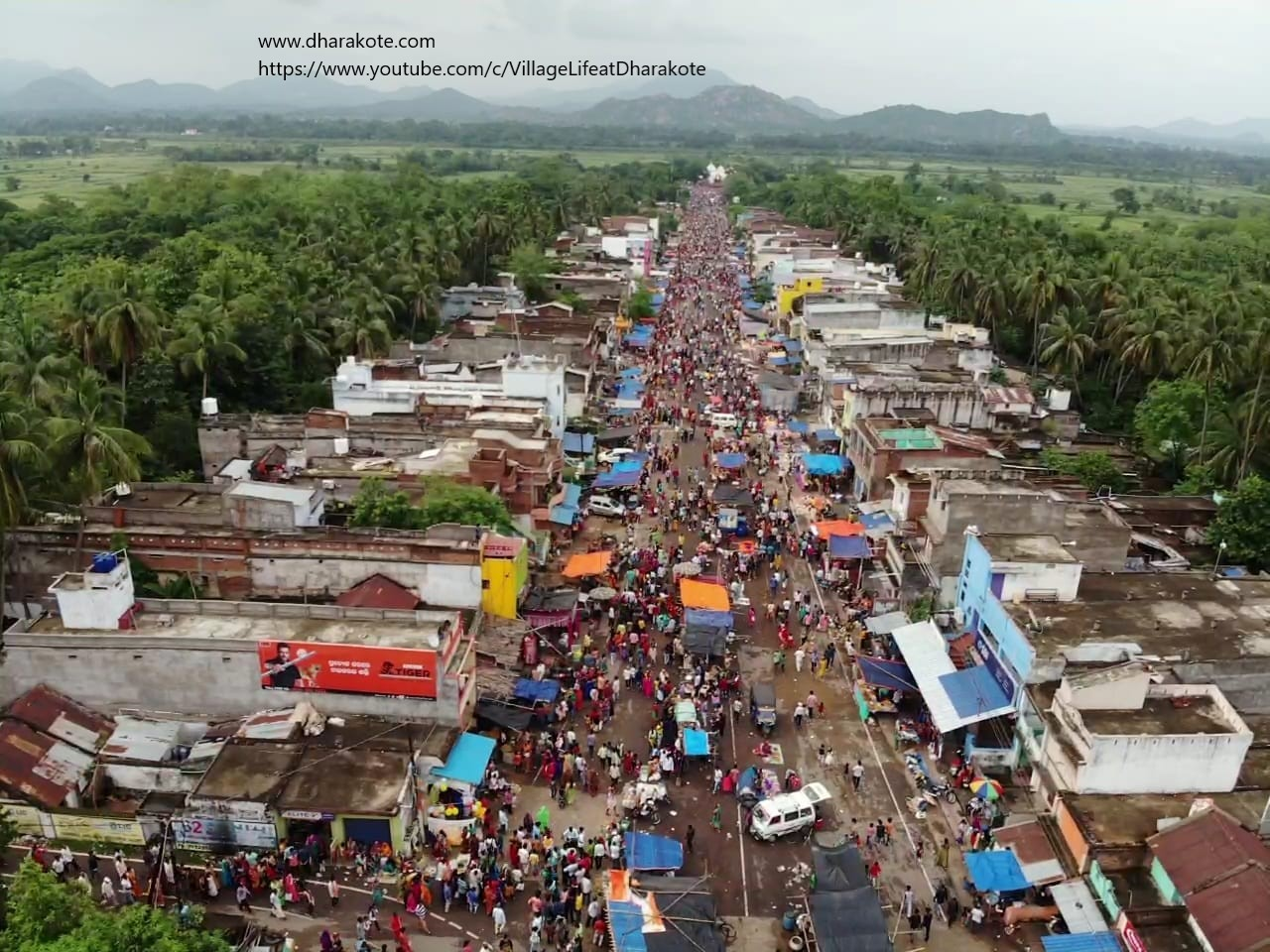

- Location in Odisha, India Dharakot (India)
- Coordinates: 19.642°N 84.579°E
- Country: India
- State: Odisha
- District: Ganjam
- Established: 1574
- Founder: Raja Hadu Singh

Government
  - Type: Gram Panchayat
  - Body: Dharakot GP
- Elevation: 30 m (98 ft)

Languages
  - Official: Odia
- Time zone: UTC+5:30 (IST)
- PIN: 761107
- Telephone code: 06822
- Vehicle registration: OR-07; OD-07

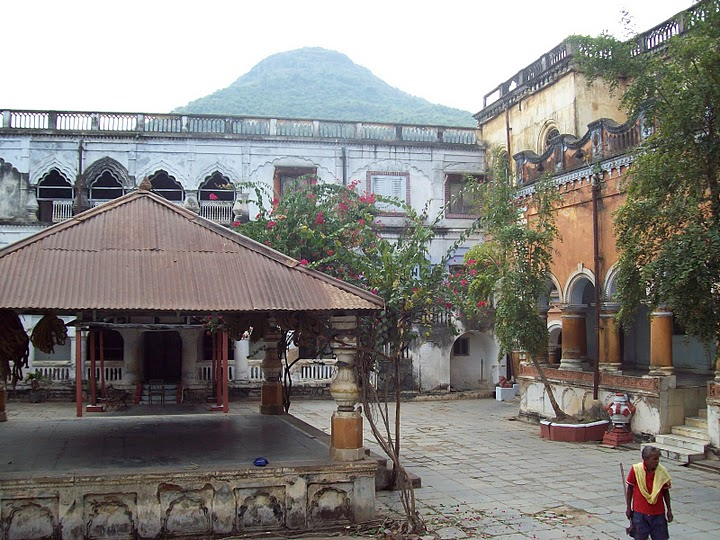
Dharakote Maharaja Palace

Dharakot is a semi-urban village and former zamindari estate in Dharakot Community Development Block of Ganjam district in the Indian state of Odisha.

== Geography ==
Dharakot is located at 19.38°N 84.34°E, about 12 km north-west from Asika and 55 km from Silk City Brahmapur. NH 59 (Gopalpur-Khariar) passes through Dharakot.

Administratively it consists of three subdivisions: Jahada with 85 villages, Kunanogada with 37 villages, and Sahasrango with 66 villages.

=== Villages of Dharakot ===
- Kanagiridi
- Panibandha
- Baharpur (12 km)
- Balarampur
- Baradabili (12 km)
- Arjuna palli
- Kahira palli
- Dharakot
- Dhaugam
- Golla Damodarpalli
- Jaga Mohan (2.4 km)
- Dasamaili
- Haripur
- Bethuar
- Dakabaja
- Jahada (4.4 km)
- Jhadabandha
- Jharapari
- Machhakot
- Manikapur (27 km)
- Mundamarai (3 km)
- Rugumu (8 km)
- Saradhapur (5.5 km)
- Singipur
- Pratapur (7 km)

== History ==
This place was earlier under Khindirisrunga (ଖିଣ୍ଡିରିଶୃଙ୍ଗ) or Khidisingi (ଖିଡ଼ିସିଙ୍ଗି) Mandala which comprised present day Sorada, Dharakot, Sheragada blocks of Ganjam district (also includes some parts of Mohana block of Gajapati district).

== Politics ==
Dharakot is a part of Sanakhemundi Assembly Constituency. The MLA from Sanakhemundi Assembly Constituency is Ramesh Chandra Jena of INC, who won the seat in state elections in 2019 and previously in 2009 after delimitation of seats. Therevious MLA from this seat was Nandini Devi (2014) of BJD.

Dharakot is a part of Aska (Lok Sabha constituency).
