= Asika =

Asika Aska
- Town
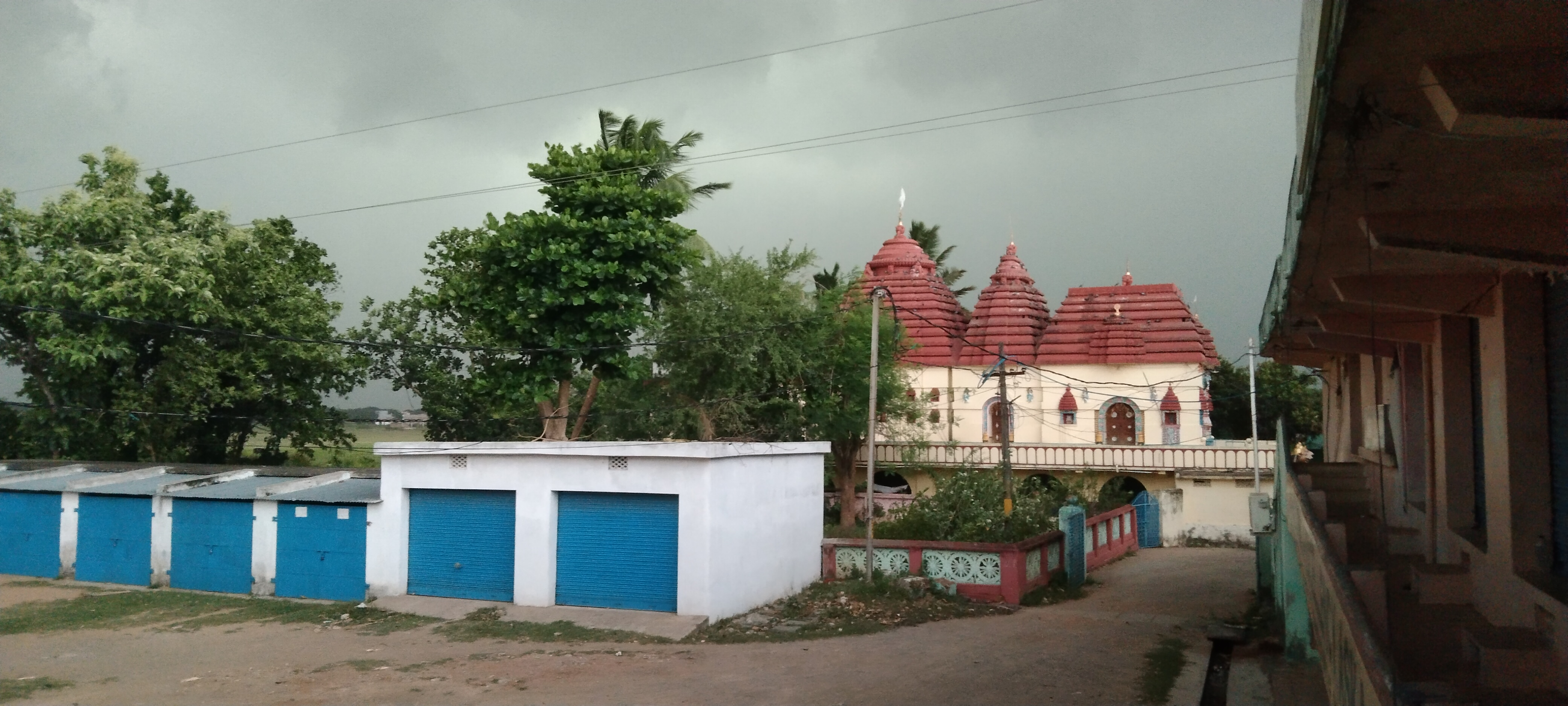
- View of Satya Narayan Temple before Rain
- Nickname: The Sugar City
- Location in Odisha, India, Asia, World Asika (India) Asika (Asia) Asika (Earth)
- Coordinates: 19.6°N 84.65°E
- Country: India
- State: Odisha
- District: Ganjam
- Sub-division: Bhanjanagar

Government
  - Type: Municipality
  - Body: Asika Municipality
  - Chairperson: Bineta Swain (BJD)
  - Member of Legislative Assembly: Saroj Kumar Padhi(BJP)
  - Member of Parliament: Anita Subhadarshini (BJP)

Area
  - Town: 8 km^{2} (3.1 sq mi)
  - Rank: 2nd in Ganjam District by Population
- Elevation: 30 m (98 ft)

Population (2022)
  - Town: 30,545
  - Density: 3,800/km^{2} (9,900/sq mi)
  - Rural: 143,770

Languages
  - Official: Odia
- Time zone: UTC+5:30 (IST)
- PIN: 761110
- Telephone code: 06822
- Vehicle registration: OD-07 (Ganjam); OD-32 (Bhanjanagar)

Asika, also known as Aska, is a town and municipality in the Ganjam district of the Indian state of Odisha. Known locally as the Sugar city. Asika lies near the confluence of the Rushikulya and Badanadi rivers and is a minor regional centre for trade and agro-processing. The shrine of Maa Khambeswari is an important local landmark.

== Geography ==
Aska is located at 19.6°N 84.65°E. Aska is located at approximately 19.6°N, 84.65°E, with an average elevation of about 30 m. It sits around 40 km north of Brahmapur, 35 km south of Bhanjanagar, and 37 km west of Surada. The nearby river confluence hosts the annual Baruni Yatra.

== Etymology ==
The name is linked by local accounts to the archaic Sanskrit-Prakrit (असिक) (aśik/Asik) ("whinyard", "obelisk" or “dagger”), in reference to the dagger-like landform created by the meeting of the Rushikulya and Badanadi rivers. During the colonial period Aska’s central location within Ganjam made it into a local administrative and military hub.

== Demographics ==
As of the 2011 Census of India, Aska has a population of more than 30,000 as of 2011 hence make it the one of largest city in terms of population Ganjam district, Including Mukundapur CT more than 10,000 people are living in the satellite area of this town namely Kalasandhapur, Babanpur, Nuagam Baragam, and College Square. Males constitute 52% of the population and females 48%. Aska has an average literacy rate of 85.76%, higher than the national average of 72.87%; with 56% of the males and 44% of females literate. 12% of the population is under 6 years of age.

Religion in Asika
| Hinduism | 98.54% |
| Islam | 1.25% |
| Christianity | 0.14% |
| Sikh | 0.01% |
| Buddhist | 0.01% |
| Jain | 0.00% |
| Not Stated | 0.05% |
| Other | 0.00% |

On 30 Aug 2025, the Government of Odisha upgraded Aska NAC to be a Municipality.

Aska is governed by a municipality and is divided into 18 wards. It also serves a wider rural hinterland through markets and services.

- Ward no. 1- Raghunath Nagar
- Ward no. 2- Bani Bihar
- Ward no. 3- Khambeswari Patna
- Ward no. 4- Khambeswari Patna
- Ward no. 5- M.G. Road
- Ward no. 6- Gopabandhu Nagar
- Ward no. 7, 8 & 9- Sunamba Street
- Ward no. 10- Taluka Road
- Ward no. 11- Harihar Nagar
- Ward no. 12- Kalinga Road
- Ward no. 13- Binayak Bazar, Laxmi Bazar, Hatapada and Kalimukhi Street
- Ward no. 14- Niranjan Nagar
- Ward no. 15- UB Road
- Ward no. 16- Lacchman Palli and Gandhi Nagar
- Ward no. 17- Lala Sasan and Shastri Nagar
- Ward no. 18- Pakalla Palli

== Industries ==
=== Aska Sugar Factory ===
Industrial sugar-making at Aska can be traced to the mid-nineteenth century, when a factory attributed to Binny & Co. operated in the then Madras Presidency alongside other early mills at Nellikuppam and Bimlipatam. Local narratives further credit F. J. V. Minchin (“Minchin Sahib”) with purchasing a loss-making unit in the 1850s, importing continental machinery, and substantially redesigning the works; contemporary technical notes from the late 1850s indicate significant activity at Aska at that time. The chronology and precedence of these ventures are, however, contested. One strand of local and corporate lore asserts that Aska hosted “Asia’s first sugar factory”, often dated to 1824 and sometimes described as a French initiative later taken over by Binny; by contrast, industry histories and EID Parry’s own corporate records consistently identify Nellikuppam (South Arcot) as India’s first modern sugar plant, started in the 1840s. A cautious characterisation used by several scholars is that Aska was among the earliest industrial sugar works in the Presidency, even if its primacy over Nellikuppam is not demonstrated to the standards of modern historiography. There is also disagreement over early proprietorship: some accounts emphasise Parry’s presence at Aska, while others link the nineteenth-century unit primarily to Binny: and over exact dates in the sequence (with 1848 frequently given for a jaggery or sugar works and 1856 for Minchin’s rebuild, though some late retellings introduce a likely erroneous “1948” start).

Following changes in ownership, local histories hold that the privately run factory later passed to the Sahu family and ceased operations by 1936, reflecting broader headwinds for cane sugar in the late colonial period. The modern phase began with the registration of Aska Cooperative Sugar Industries Limited (ACSIL) in 1956 and the commencement of crushing in 1963–64 with a roughly 1,000 TCD plant, subsequently balanced to about 1,200 TCD and expanded during the 1990s to around 2,500 TCD. The cooperative also operates a molasses-based distillery producing rectified spirit and allied products. Estimates of the economic footprint vary by source: ACSIL commonly cites engagement with roughly 20,000 cane growers in its command area and, when counting dependants and allied livelihoods, a figure of “about 35,000 families”.

Relations between the mill and growers have periodically been strained by payment delays and cane-price disputes. Farmer organisations and press reports have, at times, alleged arrears running into crores of rupees (for example, coverage of dues in 2013), while cooperative announcements have also highlighted upward revisions to the cane price (such as a rise to ₹3,500 per tonne in early 2025). Such revisions do not automatically change the centrally notified Fair and Remunerative Price (FRP) or any state-specific additional price (SAP), and year-to-year realisations depend on a mix of policy, recovery rates, and market conditions.

Environmental compliance has been another recurring theme. In 2011–12, the Central Pollution Control Board issued closure directions/notices concerning the distillery linked to ACSIL, citing deficiencies in effluent treatment and zero-liquid-discharge arrangements; subsequent correspondence and reporting refer to upgrades undertaken to meet tightening national norms for distillery effluents. In recent years, the Government of Odisha has framed Aska’s modernisation as part of a wider effort to stabilise crushing seasons, support cane cultivation, and strengthen cooperative governance, including the constitution of task forces in 2024–25 to examine revival models used in other states.

Beyond factory gates, the sugar story has also entered regional memory and language. Nostalgic writing from the Madras/Chennai region sometimes claims that refined sugar from Aska was colloquially called “aska” in parts of Tamil Nadu in the early twentieth century; while striking, this linguistic note remains anecdotal and is best presented as such.

== Tourist Attraction ==
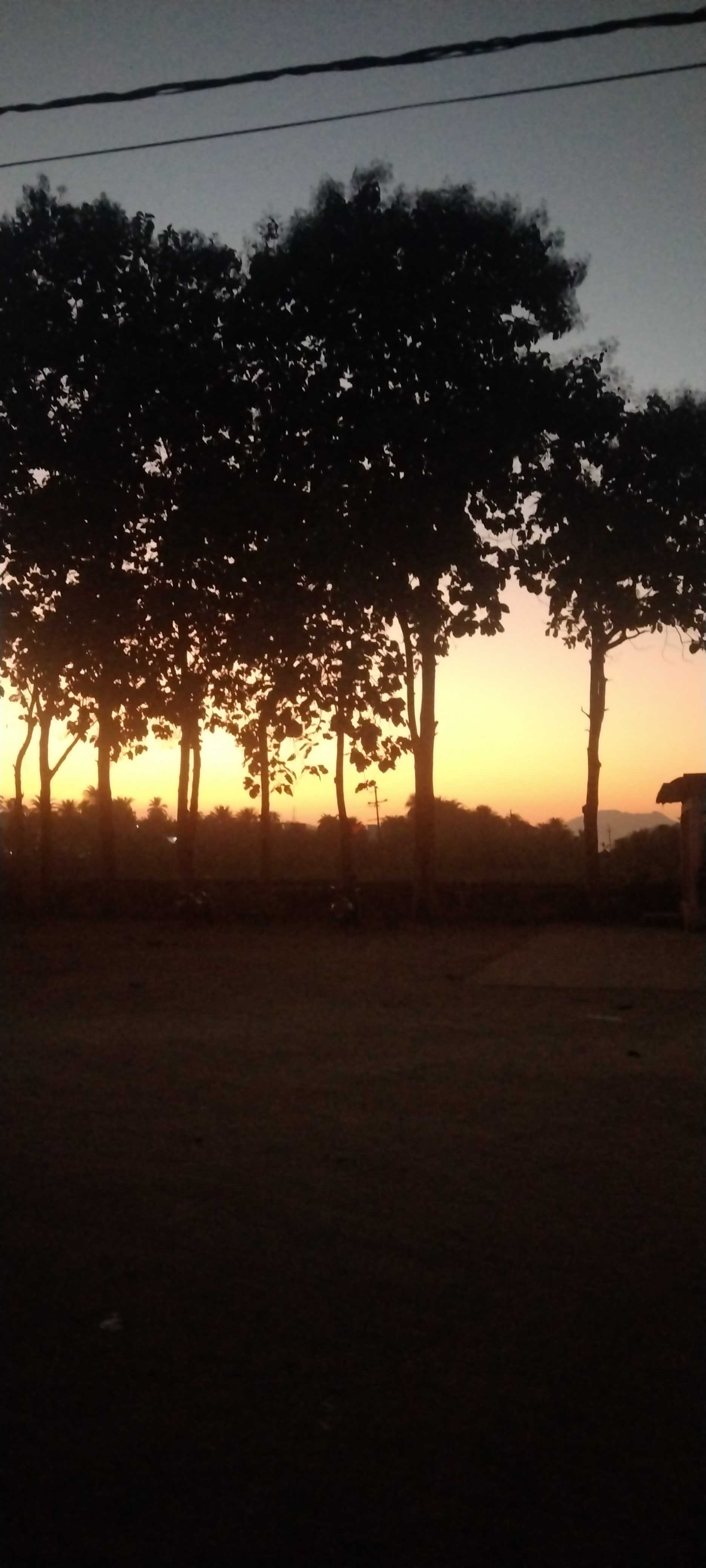
Aska-Bhanjanagar Highway at Jhadadei Square

There are many peacock reserves found near Aska at Cheramaria, Nalabanta, Pakidi Hill, Karnoli and Khandadeuli area. Blackbucks too are frequently found in the western region of Aska. There are many mandirs situated at the top of small hills in the periphery making it an ideal spot for picnic. Maa Kankan Devi Mandir is one of them.

== Religious Places ==
- Maa Khambeswari Mandir

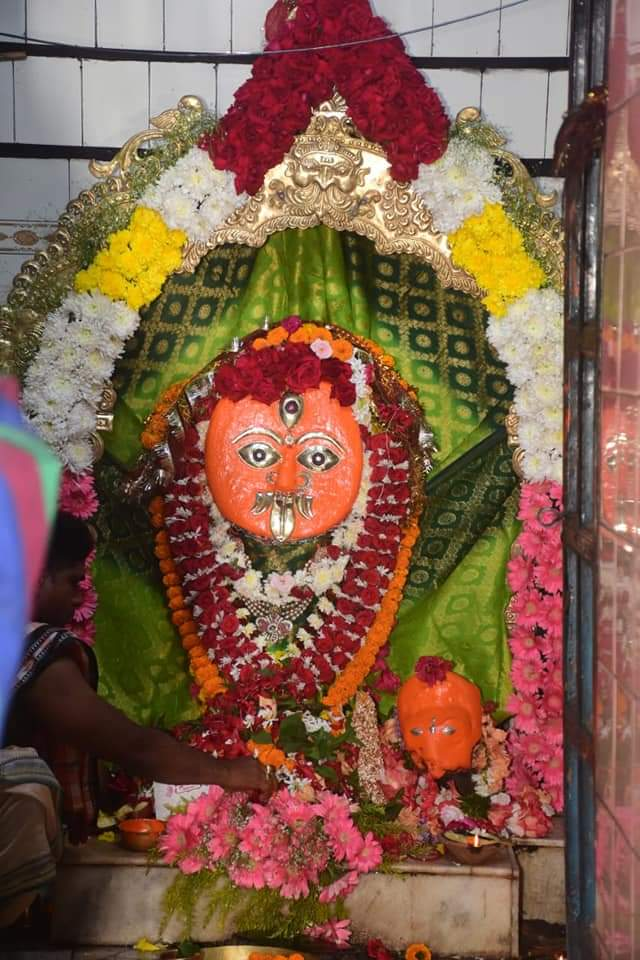
Maa Khambeswari of Aska

Baisakhi Jatra of Maa Khambeswari in Aska is held in Hindu month of Chaitra every year. Lots of devotees come for their children's well being by donating their hairs. Many folk dances and dramas are presented in roadside during the festival.

- Satyanarayan Mandir, Binayak Bazar
- Maa Fulakasuni Mandir, Odia Sahi
- Rameshwar Mandir, KS Patna
- Jagannath Mandir, Sunambo Sahi
- Panchamuki Hanuman Mandir
- Jagannath Mandir, Nuagam
- Kali Mandir, Nuagam
- Bhagabat Mandir, Nuagam
- Radha Krushna Mandir, Nuagam
- Ram Mandir, Nuagam
- Pudageswar Mandir
- Subarneswar Mandir
- Nilakantheswar Mandir
- Maa Karanjei Mandir
- Balunkeswar Mandir
- Tirupati Balaji Mandir
- Ram Mandir
- Hanuman Mandir
- Maa Kali Mandir
- Maa Kalimukhi Mandir
- Narasingha Mandir
- Maa Thakurani Mandir, Gondopuli
- Jaganath Mandir, Kalasandhapur
- Hunuman Mandir, Kalasandhapur
- Radha Krishna Mandir, Banibihar
- Sai Mandir
- Maa Kankana Devi Mandir, Bhetanai
- Ellama Potturaj Mandir, Damodarpalli
- Maa Rajjamma Kanekamma Mandir, Dhobapalli
- Hanuman Mandir, Kotibadi
- Gopinath Mandir, Raipalli
- Radhakrishna Mandir, Chadhiapalli

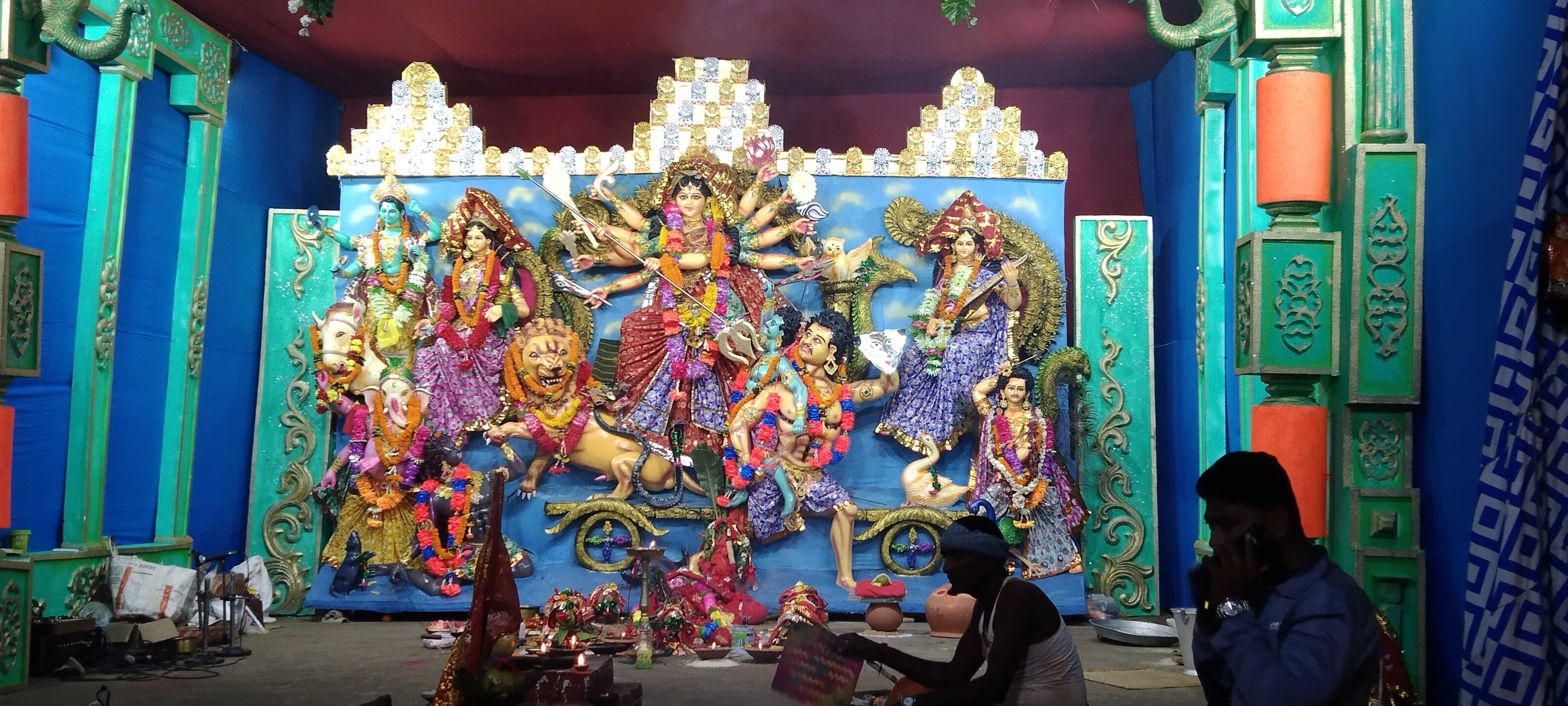
Durga Puja At Aska Busstand occurred By Aska Private Bus Association.

== Notable people ==
- Sitadevi Khadanga - An Odia dramatist, novelist and poet.

== Climate and regional setting ==
Aska has a tropical savanna climate (Köppen Aw). Maximum summer temperature is 37 °C or 98.6 °F; minimum winter temperature is 16 °C or 60.8 °F, and mean daily temperature varies from 22 to 33 °C (71.6 to 91.4 °F). May is the hottest month; December the mildest. The average annual rainfall is 1,150 millimetres or 45 inches and the region receives the monsoon and the majority of annual rainfall from June to October.

Climate data for Asika, Odisha
| Month | Jan | Feb | Mar | Apr | May | Jun | Jul | Aug | Sep | Oct | Nov | Dec | Year |
|---|---|---|---|---|---|---|---|---|---|---|---|---|---|
| Mean daily maximum °C (°F) | 27 (81) | 30 (86) | 34 (93) | 36 (97) | 37 (99) | 34 (93) | 32 (90) | 31 (88) | 32 (90) | 32 (90) | 30 (86) | 28 (82) | 32 (90) |
| Mean daily minimum °C (°F) | 16 (61) | 19 (66) | 23 (73) | 27 (81) | 29 (84) | 28 (82) | 27 (81) | 27 (81) | 26 (79) | 23 (73) | 20 (68) | 16 (61) | 23 (74) |
| Average rainfall mm (inches) | 12.4 (0.49) | 17.4 (0.69) | 18.6 (0.73) | 15.0 (0.59) | 40.3 (1.59) | 150.0 (5.91) | 282.1 (11.11) | 272.8 (10.74) | 180.0 (7.09) | 93.0 (3.66) | 33.0 (1.30) | 18.6 (0.73) | 1,133.2 (44.63) |
Source: MSM Weather

== Education ==
=== Colleges ===
- Aska Science College, Kotinada
- Niranjan Govt. Women's College, Khambeswari Patna
- Mac Mickle Sanskrit College, Niranjan Nagar
- Nimina Brundaban Chandra College, Kendupadar

=== Schools ===
- Harihar High School
- A.S.I High School Nuagam
- Kendriya Vidyalaya
- Odisha Aadarsh Vidyalaya, Nimina
- Saraswati Vidya Mandir Higher Secondary School
- Saraswati Sishu Vidya Mandir
- NAC High School
- Mac Mickle Sanskrit Vidyalaya
- Harihar Nagar UP School
- Bediri Sahi UP School
- Govt. Technical High School
- Govt. Girl's High School
- Aryan Public School
- DePaul School
- Mom School of Excellency
- Sri Aurobindo Integral Education Center, R.Damodarpalli
- Utkal Public School, Kishore Chandrapalli
- Ramakrushna Adarsha Vidya Mandir, Gayatri Nagar

== Financial Institutions/Banks ==
- State Bank of India
- Aska Central Co-operative Bank Ltd
- SBI Agriculture Development Bank
- Union Bank of India
- Axis Bank
- ICICI Bank
- Bank of India
- Utkal Grameen Bank
- Indian Overseas Bank
- Karur Vysya Bank
- Punjab National Bank
- HDFC Bank
- SBI Sme Branch

== Transport ==
=== Road ===
Aska is connected with National Highway 59 (India) (Khariar – Brahmapur), National Highway 326 (India) and National Highway 157 (India) (Purunakatak – Aska) which connect Aska to other cities and towns of Odisha.

=== Rail ===
- Brahmapur railway station

=== Air ===
- Biju Patnaik International Airport
- Berhampur Airport

=== Port ===
- Gopalpur port

== Politics ==
Aska (Vidhan Sabha constituency) includes Aska NAC Aska block and 12 GPs (Subalaya, Kaniari, Barida, Paikajamuna, Sunapalli, Sialia, Nandiagada, Borasingi, Ambapua, Baliasara, Bolasara and Sunarijhola) of Kabisuryanagar block. The current MLA from Aska Assembly Constituency is Saroj Kumar Padhi from BJP. Previous MLAs from this seat was Smt. Manjula Swain from 2019 to 2024 of BJD, Debaraj Mohanty from BJD in 1914, Duti Krushna Panda of CPI in 1990, Raghaba Parida who won representing the Indian National Congress in 1985 and 1980, and Harihar Swain of JNP in 1977.

Aska is part of Aska (Lok Sabha constituency).
