= Kanaka Durga, Raulapalli =

Religious building

Coordinates: 19.496667°N 84.813333°E

The Kanaka Durga temple is dedicated to Goddess Mahishamardini and located in Raulapalli village on a small hillock. On the basis of architecture and local inscriptions the temple was renovated on the early 19th century after the old one was damaged. The temple is a pancharatha temple having all qualities of a Kalingan temple. It consists of a Rekha deula (vimana), Pidha deula (jagamohana), Pidha deula (natamandapa). The presiding deity is an image of Durga having six hands slaying Mahishasura. Durga Puja is celebrated with pomp and joy here. Another major festival is Chaitra utsava which ends on Vishuva Sankranti.

== Location ==
The temple is 6 km (3.7 mi) from Jaugada. One can come from Berhampur via Purushottampur to Pandia and then come to Raulapalli. Nearest railhead is Berhampur.

== Bibliography ==
- reports on Kanaka Durga
- kanaka durga temple photos
