= Randha =

- Village
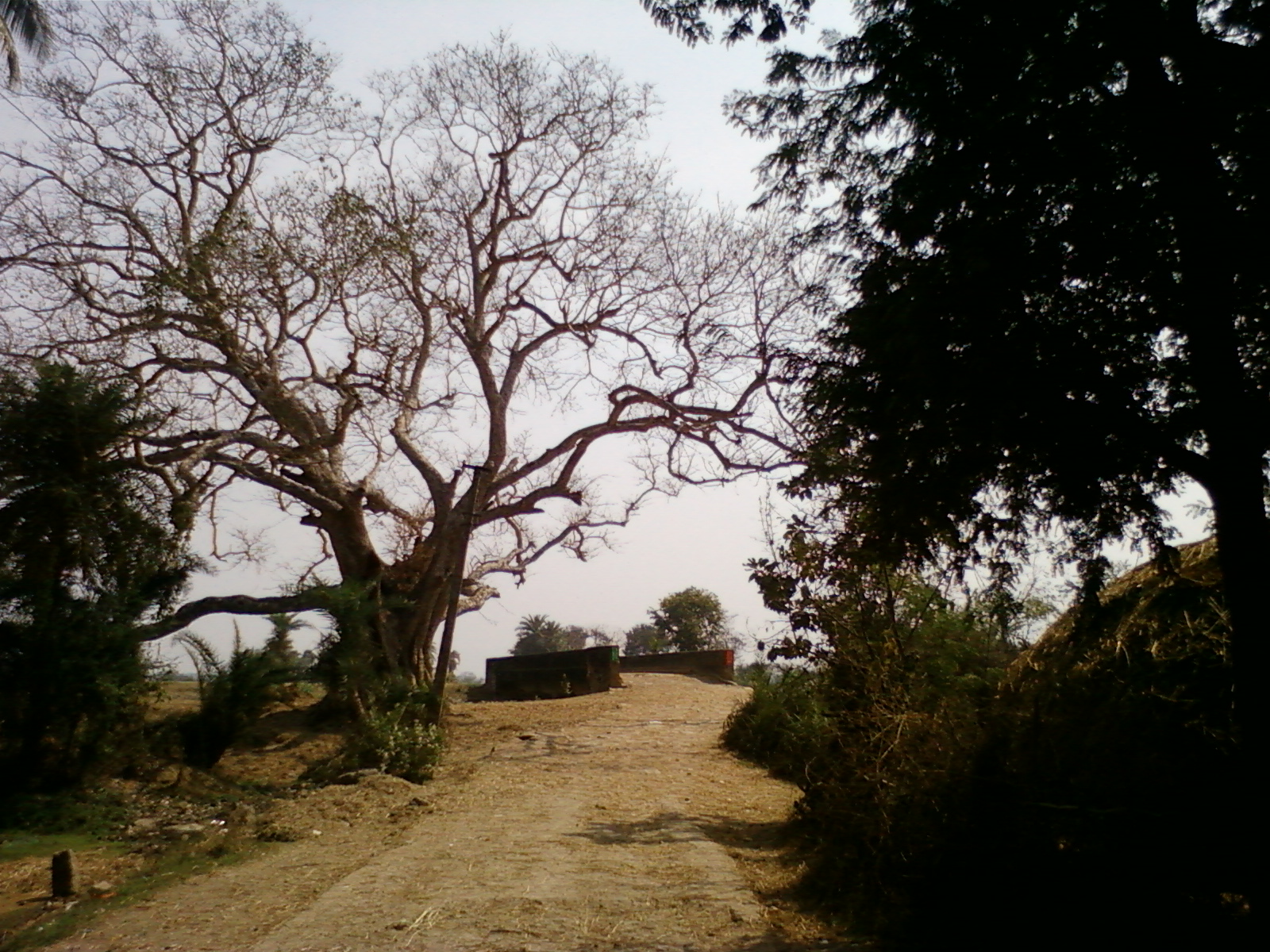
- Interactive map of Randha
- Coordinates: 20°05′N 81°32′E
- Country: India
- State: Odisha
- District: Ganjam
- Time zone: UTC+5:30 (IST)
- PIN: 761008
- Telephone code: 0680

Randha is one of the significant village in the Kanisi Tehsil of Ganjam district in the Indian State of Odisha. The Pincode of Randha is 761008. The village is 31.2 km from its district main sub-division Chatrapur and 180 km from the state capital Bhubaneswar . Randha is a suburb of Berhampur, which is 6 km away.

== Geography ==
Some of the villages close to Randha are Chikarada (3.2 km away), Panchama (2 km), Kanisi (2 km), Golanthara(2.2 km), and Jugudi (5.2 km).

== Occupations ==
Many residents commute to nearby Berhampur for work. There are many businessman and farmers in Randha. Agriculture is the mainstay of the economy in the village. Randha is a market hub for nearby villages, especially for fresh vegetables and grosory.

== Temples & Festivals ==
Most people in the village are Hindus. Randha is a hub of temples. A number of temples are established in the village out of which Mukteswar Temple is very prominent. The brightening of those temples often occurs in the festivals like Maha Shivratri, Diwali and the decorated stalls during Dushera. Ganesh Puja is celebrated. Regional festivals are Jhami yatra, Makar Sankranti, Danda Yatra & meru, Rath yatra (Sri Jagannath Yatra).

=== Thakurani Yatra ===
Maa budhi Thakurani, popularly known as 'Thakurani Yatra' is an annual festival in the village. Maa budhi Thakurani goddess is brought in the form of flower to a temporarily constructed temple. The flower comes automatically from the head of maa budhi thakurani, and to observe this event people gather at the temple.

During the Yatra, many theatre acts, musical melodies are organised in Randha, and family gatherings are common. On the last day of Yatra, Maa budhi Thakurani is again sent back to a permanent temple which is located in village itself. According to old beliefs the flower again travels back to the temple, and to avoid being cursed the villagers should not see this. Randha yatra committee decides the date of the yatra.

== Visiting places ==
Some places to visit near the village are:

- Gopalpur-on-sea
- Silk city Berhampur
- Tara Tarini temple
- Siddha_Vairabi_Temple
- Ishaneswar temple
- Panchama Ganesh temple
- IRE Port
- Sonapur beach
- Ghatakeswar temple

== Education ==
In Randha are a number of colleges, sanklp daybording school, kit coaching centres and other educational institutions, including the Primary high school (Randha) and Saraswati sisu vidya mandir. Nearby are Kanisi high school and Takshila.

Near Randha the Indian institute of science education and research (IISER Berhampur), National institute of science & Technology (NIST), Khallikote University, Gandhi Institute of Industrial Technology, and the Roland Institute of Technology are there.

== Banks ==
The state bank of india, uco bank, bank of india(RGB) is in konisi .
