= Raulibandha =

Coordinates: 19.443280°N 84.988057°E

Raulibandha is a village in Malada Gram Panchayat, Ganjam district in the state of Odisha, India.

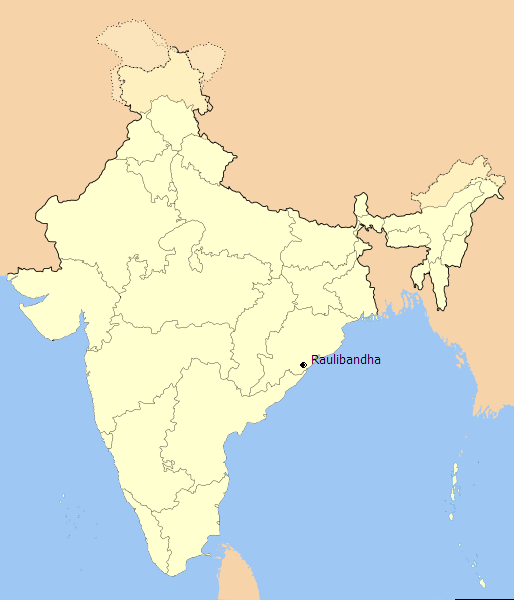
Raulibandha Village in Ganjam district, Orissa.

== Geography ==
Raulibandha is located 3 km from the State Highway connecting Humma-Purushottampur at the nearest village Santoshpur. The total area of the village is 324.545 acres (131.339 ha).

== Demography ==
As of 2011 census, Raulibandha has a total population of 687 (male:47%, female:53%). Raulibandha has a literacy rate of 69% (male:89%, female:53%)lower than the state average literacy rate of 73%. 16% of the population is under 6 years of age. Average sex ratio of the village is 1127 which is higher than the Odisha state's average of 979, whereas child sex ratio is only 909, lower than the Odisha average of 941. Since Ganjam district has border with Andhra Pradesh, like many other places- majority of population in Raulibandha is Telugu by mother tongue.

== Life of Raulibandha ==
Raulibandha has one primary school to study up to 5th class, then students have to go to Santoshpur, located at 3 km for high school. People of Raulibandha are mostly engaged in agricultural activities. Rice, ground nut, cashew nut, different pulses, mustard, etc.

Few families have migrated to Chirmiri, Chhattisgarh in search of work mostly in coal mines.

According to Risk Assessment, Vulnerability Analysis and Capacity Analysis by the state government, Raulibandha is vulnerable to flood by the nearby river Rishukulya situated on the other side of the village to Municipentha.

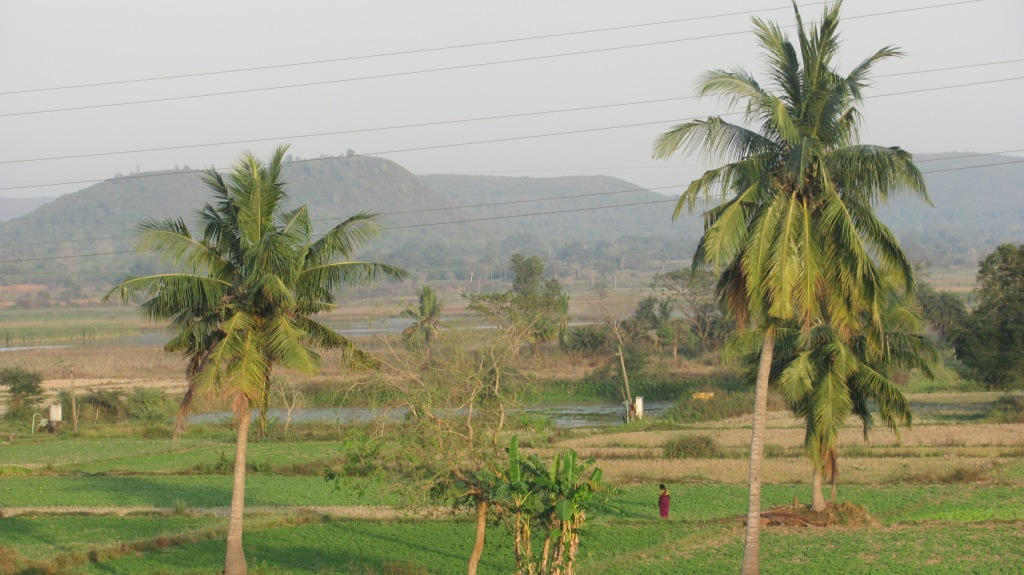
People busy with their agricultural works

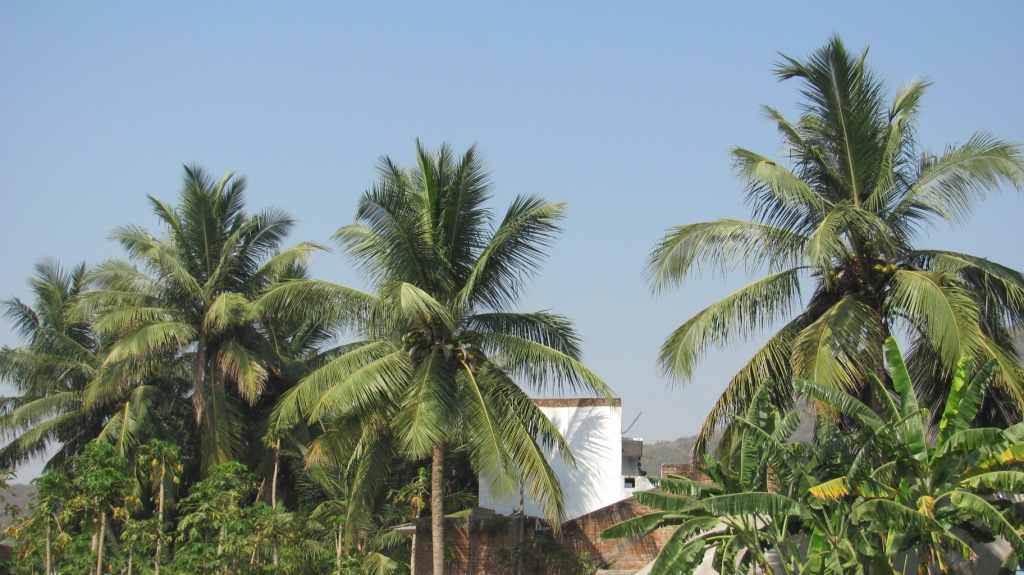
Raulibandha at the lap of nature

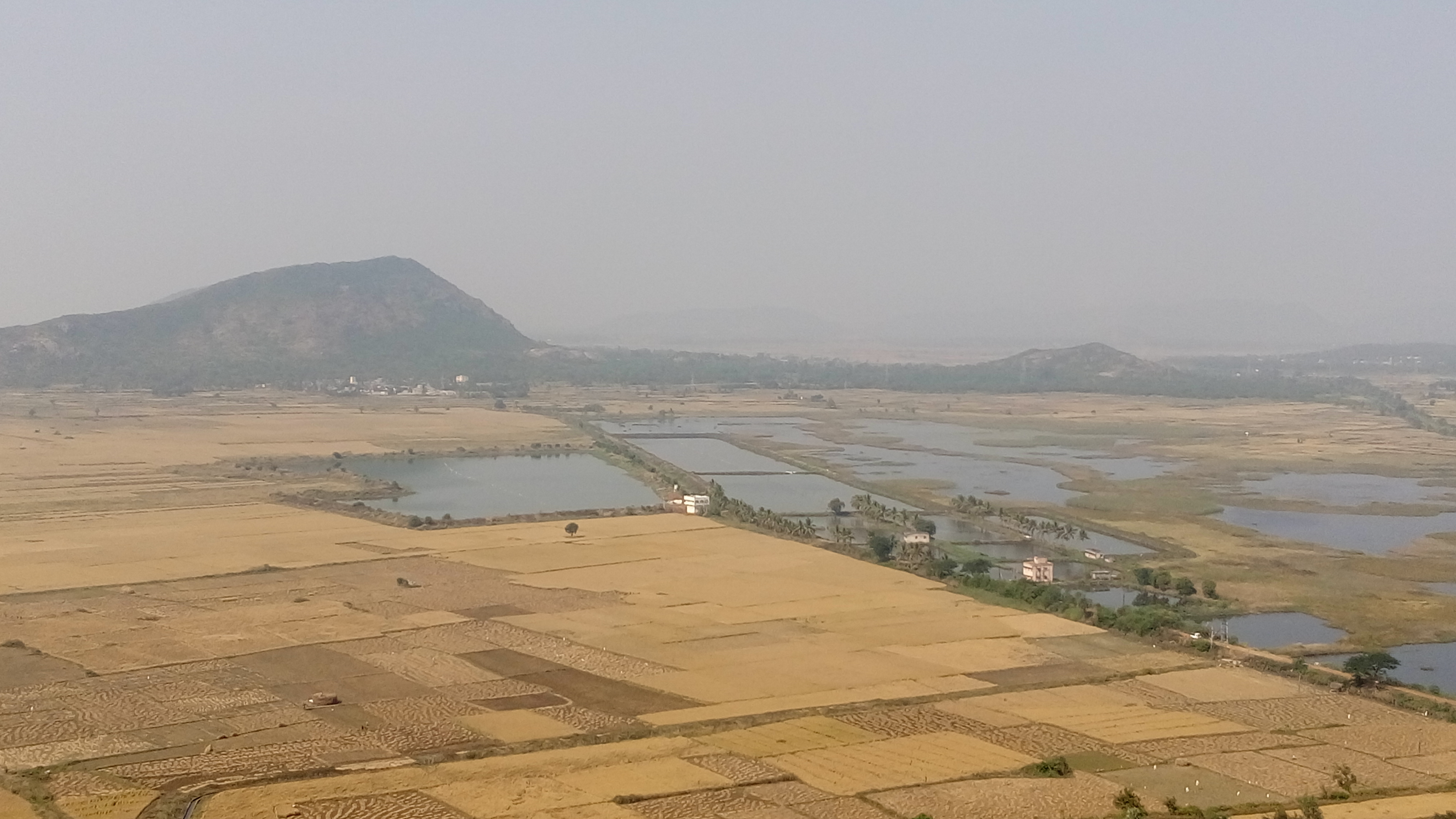
Raulibandha's wetland areas. View from nearby hill top
