= Achuli =

Village in Odisha, India

- Village
- Location in Orissa, India
- Coordinates: 19.50217°N 84.900118°E
- Country: India
- State: Odisha

Population (2011)
  - Total: 1,357

Languages
  - Official: Oriya, Hindi, English
- Time zone: UTC+5:30 (IST)
- PIN: 761018
- Vehicle registration: OR-07
- Nearest city: Bhubaneswar
- Sex ratio: 981 ♂/♀
- Literacy: 71.88%
- Website: www.ganjam.nic.in

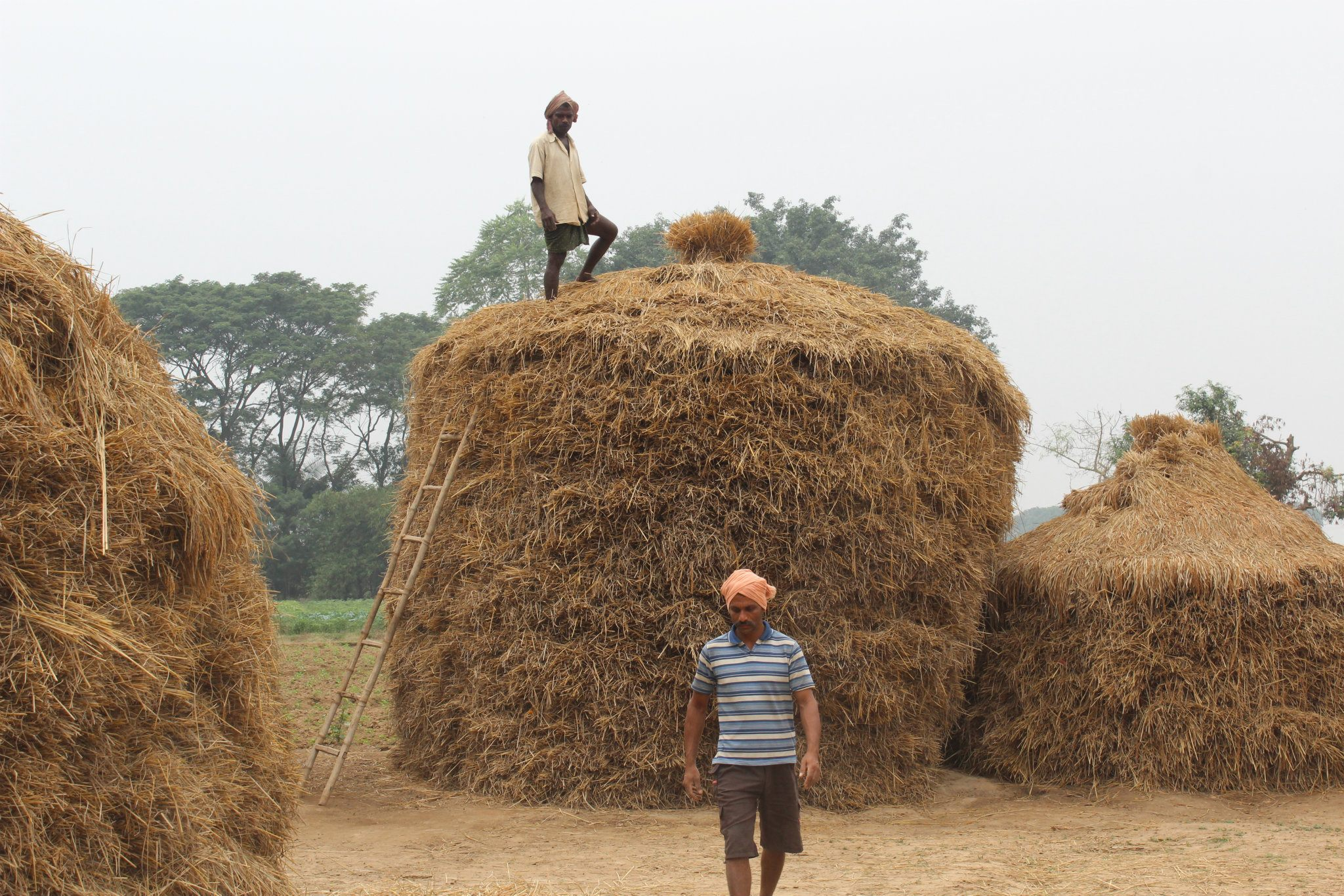
Two Indian men gather hay for feeding cattle.

Achuli is a village in Purushottampur block, Ganjam District, Odisha, India. Its village code is 118336. It is one of the 25 villages that fall under the Purushottampur block. Achuli is located 3.4 km from Purushottampur, 20.9 km from Chatrapur, and 129 km from the state capital Bhubaneswar.

According to the 2011 census, the village of 1357 persons, includes 683 males and 674 females. The local elections are held in Khalikote (SC) Assembly Constituency (Aska Loksabha, Orissa).

== Demographics ==
The population of Achuli is predominantly Hindu. The village counts 601 scheduled castes, 7 from scheduled tribe while 749 are from the general category.

== Central government schemes ==
Under the Mahatma Gandhi National Rural Employment Guarantee Act ₹ 10 lakhs have been sanctioned to the village Gram Panchayat for construction projects in and around the village.
