= Suryamani Baidya =

Indian politician

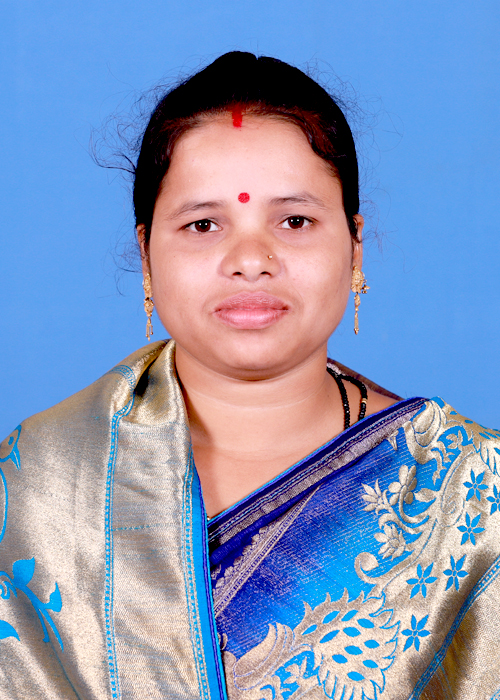

Member of Odisha Legislative Assembly
- In office 2019–2024
- Preceded by: Purna Chandra Sethy
- Constituency: Khalikote

Personal details
- Political party: Biju Janata Dal
- Profession: Politician

Suryamani Baidya is an Indian politician from Odisha. She was a Member of the Odisha Legislative Assembly from 2019, representing Khalikote Assembly constituency as a Member of the Biju Janata Dal.

== See also ==
- 2019 Odisha Legislative Assembly election
- Odisha Legislative Assembly
