= Ranjhalli =

Ranjhalli Khari Gaan
- Village
- Location in Odisha, India Ranjhalli (India)
- Coordinates: 19.49°N 84.86°E
- Country: India
- State: Odisha
- District: Ganjam
- Elevation: 19 m (62 ft)

Population (2014)
  - Total: 2,450

Languages
  - Official: Odia
- Time zone: UTC+5:30 (IST)
- PIN: 761018
- Vehicle registration: OD-07
- Sex ratio: 800 ♂/♀
- Website: The Ganjam District Official Website

Ranjhalli is a village panchayat near the river bank of Rushikulya and located at heart of the Ganjam district. It has population of nearly about 2,400 with 700 families (as per the 2011 census). Most residents are farmers and labourers.

== History ==
The village started with only 2 streets, named Kama Sahi & Bada Danda Sahi and has continued to expand. The main cause of expanding and establishment was its much fertile land and availability of water for farming. Due to communication connections with nearby cities, this village came to front view of Purushottampur Block. And now it has been a major Grama Panchayat in this Block.

== Geography ==
Located 35 km from Berhampur Railway Station through Roadways. There's no alternative other than roadways. adjacent to SH32 and Rushikulya. Near by airport is Biju Patnaik International Airport at Bhubaneswar at distance of 140 km away. Surrounded by few small Mountains as like Keshpur Mountain and The Famous Maa Tara Tarini Mountain at distance of 200meter & 2 km respectively. Number of men made water bodies were also present for daily use, Irrigation and for Fishing.

Major streets

Sl. No.	Street Name	Number of Families
01	Bhandari Street	
02	Tala Street	
03	Neli Bandha Street	
04	Maa Mangala Street	
05	Majhi Street	
06	Kamaa Street	
07	Bada Danda Street	
08	Keuta Street	
09	Bauri Street	
10	Bandha Street	

== Demographics ==
Most of the population were aged between 20 and 35 years. And 68% will be Female out of total. 60% will come under Scheduled Castes and Scheduled Tribes. Another 40% will be Brahmin General with some Other Backward Class

== Recognized commercial firms ==
Peoples of this village have established some commercial firms. Such as many poultry, vegetable, and mushroom firms. There are three Petrol Pumps also, invested and managed by few residents. Coincidentally there was a Private Ayurveda Drug Manufacturing Unit also named Kalinga Ayurvedic Pharmacy. Link label

== Schools ==
There is One Upper Primary School Under Sarva Shiksha Abhiyan established in 1953 providing education from standard 1 to 7 in Odia medium. The number of student will be about to 300.

There is also a high school named Beer Bajarang High Schoolunder Board of Secondary Education, Odisha from standard 8 to 10. The high school was opened in the year 1995 with only 35 students and 3 teachers. The class was commenced with in a single room of Panchayat office premises at preliminary stage. But nowadays this school is growing under State Government With a huge Capacity of 250 students out of which 143 students only in Class 10. This number of students is due to incoming children from near by villages.

But nowadays many children prefer to study at private nursing schools located in Purushottampur.

There is no college for higher studies since at a distance of 3 km only ene college is available.

== The Grama Panchayat Ranjhalli ==
This panchayat consists of five villages

1. Mukundpur
2. Keshpur
3. Pichuli
4. Hatapur
5. Khosalpalli

== Notable people ==
Notable people from this village include Mr. Shyam Sundar Padhi (former Director General of Odisha Police) and his wife Mrs. Amiya Padhi (the first lady judge of Honourable Odisha High Court); one of the historical persons who was a soldier in Burma from the British era named Shree Mohana Parida was also from this soil (he holds the record of living more than 100 years but documentary evidence of this is lacking).
