= Makarajhola =

- Village
- Location in Odisha, India Makarajhola (India)
- Coordinates: 19.44°N 84.73°E
- Country: India
- State: Odisha
- District: Ganjam

Population (2017)
  - Total: 6,121

Languages
  - Official: Odia
- Time zone: UTC+5:30 (IST)
- PIN: 761101
- Telephone code: 06811
- Vehicle registration: OD07
- Website: odisha.gov.in

Makarajhola is a village and a gram panchayat in Ganjam district in the Indian state of Odisha. As of the 2011 census in India Makarajhola had a population of 5,436 . Males constitute 51% of the population and females 49%. It is part of Aska (Lok Sabha constituency).
