= Duti Krushna Panda =

Indian politician (1923–2019)

Duti Krushna Panda (July 1, 1923 – May 5, 2019) was an Indian politician and leader of Communist Party of India. He was a former member of Lok Sabha from Bhanjanagar (Presently Aska) Lok Sabha constituency in 1971. He was also elected as Member of Legislative Assembly in 1990 from Aska Constituency. He was the secretary of CPI Odisha state council and president of AITUC. He was actively associated with several trade unions and was the founder president of Odisha Anganwardi Workers' Association. He was also the president of Ganjam district sugar growers' association.
