= Aska Assembly constituency =

Constituency of the Odisha legislative assembly in India

Coordinates: 19.61°N 84.66°E

Aska
- Constituency No. 128 for the Odisha Legislative Assembly
- Aska Assembly constituency in Ganjam district

Constituency details
- Country: India
- Region: East India
- State: Odisha
- Division: Southern Division
- District: Ganjam
- Lok Sabha constituency: Aska
- Established: 1951
- Total electors: 2,03,348 (Note: as on 2024) (Note: as data published by election commission)
- Reservation: None

Member of Legislative Assembly
- 17th Odisha Legislative Assembly
- Incumbent Saroj Kumar Padhi
- Party: Bharatiya Janata Party
- Elected year: 2024

Aska (Sl. No.: 128) is a Vidhan Sabha constituency of Ganjam district, Odisha.

This constituency includes Aska, Aska block and 12 GPs (Subalaya, Kaniari, Barida, Paikajamuna, Sunapalli, Sialia, Nandiagada, Borasingi, Ambapua, Baliasara, Bolasara and Sunarijhola) of Kabisuryanagar block.

== Elected members ==
Vote share of winning candidates
| 2024 | 49.21% |
| 2019 | 55.50% |
| 2014 | 54.84% |
| 2009 | 52.25% |
| 2004 | 30.49% |
| 2000 | 44.09% |
| 1995 | 36.50% |
| 1990 | 63.06% |
| 1985 | 44.78% |
| 1980 | 45.88% |
| 1977 | 59.17% |

Since its formation in 1951, Seventeen elections were held. It was a two seat constituency in 1951.

List of members elected from Aska constituency are:

| Year | Member | Party |
|---|---|---|
| 2024 | Saroj Kumar Padhi | Bharatiya Janata Party |
| 2019 | Manjula Swain | Biju Janata Dal |
| 2014 | Debaraj Mohanty | Biju Janata Dal |
| 2009 | Debaraj Mohanty | Biju Janata Dal |
| 2004 | Saroj Kumar Padhi | Independent politician |
| 2000 | Debaraj Mohanty | Biju Janata Dal |
| 1995 | Usha Rani Panda | Indian National Congress |
| 1990 | Dwitikrushna Panda | Communist Party of India |
| 1985 | Raghab Parida | Indian National Congress |
| 1980 | Raghab Parida | Indian National Congress (I) |
| 1977 | Harihar Swain | Janata Party |
| 1974 | Harihara Das | Communist Party of India |
| 1971 | Krushna Chandra Tripathy | Utkal Congress |
| 1967 | Harihara Das | Communist Party of India |
| 1961 | Lokanath Mishra | Indian National Congress |
| 1957 | Harihara Das | Communist Party of India |
| 1951 (Note: It was a 2 member constituency) | Harihara Das | Communist Party of India |
| 1951 | Mohana Naik | Communist Party of India |

== Election results ==
=== 2024 ===
Voting were held on 20 May 2024 in 2nd phase of Odisha Assembly Election & 5th phase of Indian General Election. Counting of votes was on 4 June 2024. In 2024 election, Bharatiya Janata Party candidate Saroj Kumar Padhi defeated Biju Janata Dal candidate Manjula Swain by a margin of 8,059 votes.

2024 Odisha Vidhan Sabha Election, Aska
| Party | Candidate | Votes | % | ±% |
|---|---|---|---|---|
| BJP | Saroj Kumar Padhi | 59,083 | 49.21 | |
| BJD | Manjula Swain | 51,024 | 42.50 | |
| INC | Surabhi Bisoyi | 5,316 | 4.43 | |
| NOTA | None of the above | 1,922 | 1.6 | |
| Majority | | 8,059 | 6.71 | |
| Turnout | | 1,20,067 | 59.05 | |
| BJP gain from BJD | | | | |

=== 2019 ===
In 2019 election, Biju Janata Dal candidate Manjula Swain defeated Bharatiya Janata Party candidate Debaraj Mohanty by a margin of 27,233 votes.

2019 Vidhan Sabha Election, Aska
| Party | Candidate | Votes | % | ±% |
|---|---|---|---|---|
| BJD | Manjula Swain | 66,872 | 55.5 | |
| BJP | Debaraj Mohanty | 39,639 | 32.9 | |
| INC | Manoj Kumar Jena | 9,285 | 7.71 | |
| NOTA | None of the above | 1,854 | 1.54 | |
| Majority | | 27,233 | 22.6 | |
| Turnout | | 1,20,495 | 61.04 | |
| BJD hold | | | | |

=== 2014 ===
In 2014 election, Biju Janata Dal candidate Debaraj Mohanty defeated Indian National Congress candidate Saroj Kumar Padhi by a margin of 23,499 votes.

2014 Odisha Vidhan Sabha Election, Aska
| Party | Candidate | Votes | % | ±% |
|---|---|---|---|---|
| BJD | Debaraj Mohanty | 59,412 | 54.84 | ▲2.59 |
| INC | Saroj Kumar Padhi | 35,913 | 33.15 | ▲15.57 |
| BJP | Narayan Behera | 6,436 | 5.94 | ▲0.12 |
| NOTA | None of the above | 1,713 | 1.58 | − |
| Majority | | 23,499 | 21.69 | ▼12.33 |
| Turnout | | 1,08,334 | 60.27 | ▲7.64 |
| BJD hold | | | | |

=== 2009 ===
In 2009 election, Biju Janata Dal candidate Debaraj Mohanty defeated Independent candidate Saroj Kumar Padhi by a margin of 29,986 votes.

2009 Vidhan Sabha Election, Aska
| Party | Candidate | Votes | % | ±% |
|---|---|---|---|---|
| BJD | Debaraj Mohanty | 46,059 | 52.25 | − |
| Independent | Saroj Kumar Padhi | 16,073 | 18.23 | − |
| INC | Alekha Chaudhury | 15,497 | 17.58 | − |
| BJP | Surya Narayan Das | 5,128 | 5.82 | − |
| Majority | | 29,986 | 34.02 (Note: %of total valid votes) | − |
| Turnout | | 88,168 | 52.63 | − |
| BJD hold | | | | |
