= Pramila Bisoyi =

Politician from Odisha, India

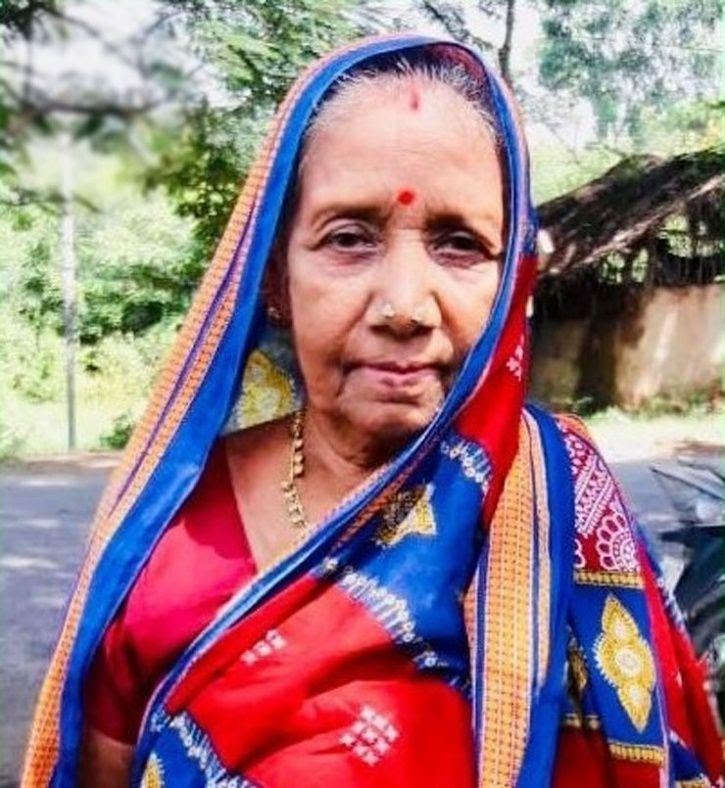

Member of Parliament, Lok Sabha
- In office 23 May 2019 – 4 June 2024
- Preceded by: Ladu Kishore Swain
- Succeeded by: Anita Subhadarshini
- Constituency: Aska

Personal details
- Born: 15 September 1948 (age 77) Kornoli
- Party: Biju Janata Dal
- Spouse: Banchanidhi Bisoyi

Pramila Bisoyi (née Swaini; born 15 September 1948 ) is an Indian politician who was the Member of Parliament in the Lok Sabha from Aska and hails from Chermaria village of Aska block in Ganjam district, Odisha. She has studied up to class 3. Bisoi has been a representative for Mission Shakti, the women's SHG movement of Odisha. She advocates for women's participation in civil society, and has been involved in ensuring their employment. She has been a part of SHG movement for over 18 years. She got married at the age of five in a child marriage.
