= Anita Subhadarshini =

Member of the Lok Sabha

Member of Parliament, Lok Sabha
- Incumbent
- Assumed office 4 June 2024
- Preceded by: Pramila Bisoyi(BJD)
- Constituency: Aska

Personal details
- Party: Bharatiya Janata Party Biju Janata Dal Indian National Congress
- Occupation: Politician

Anita Subhadarsini Pattnaik is an Indian politician from Polasara, Orissa. She was elected as a Member of Parliament from Aska Lok Sabha constituency in 2024. She is the daughter of Mrs. Kumudini Patnaik, who was also MP from Aska during 2000-2004. Anita's father Ramkrushna Patnaik was minister in Naveen Patnaik and Biju Patnaik's cabinets. Anita, Kumudini, Ramkrushna were in Biju Janata Dal earlier, later they jumped to Congress then to BJP.
