= Pandia, Odisha =

Coordinates: 19°31′N 84°49′E

Pandia is a village in Purushottampur block, Ganjam district, Odisha, India.
