= Kabisuryanagar Assembly constituency =

Constituency of the Odisha legislative assembly in India

Coordinates: 19.58°N 84.76°E

Kabisuryanagar
- Constituency No. 125 for the Odisha Legislative Assembly
- Kabisuryanagar Assembly constituency in Ganjam district

Constituency details
- Country: India
- Region: East India
- State: Odisha
- Division: Southern Division
- District: Ganjam
- Lok Sabha constituency: Aska
- Established: 1967
- Total electors: 2,38,297 (Note: as on 2024) (Note: as data published by election commission)
- Reservation: None

Member of Legislative Assembly
- 17th Odisha Legislative Assembly
- Incumbent Pratap Chandra Nayak
- Party: Bharatiya Janata Party
- Elected year: 2024

Kabisuryanagar is a Vidhan Sabha constituency of Ganjam district. Following 2008 Delimitation, Kodala Assembly constituency was subsumed into this constituency.

Area of this constituency includes Kabisuryanagar, Kodala, part of Kabisuryanagar block and part of Purusottampur block.

== Elected members ==
Vote share of winning candidates
2024	55.79%
2019	62.87%
2014	50.68%
2009	56.01%
2004	51.22%
2000	42.66%
1995	42.68%
1990	55.02%
1985	40.63%
1980	41.86%
1977	38.50%

Since its formation in 1967, 14 elections were held till date.

List of members elected from Kabisuryanagar constituency are:

Year	Member	Party
2024	Pratap Chandra Nayak	Bharatiya Janata Party
2019	Latika Pradhan	Biju Janata Dal
2014	V. Sugnana Kumari Deo	Biju Janata Dal
2009	V. Sugnana Kumari Deo	Biju Janata Dal
2004	Ladu Kishore Swain	Biju Janata Dal
2000	Nityananda Pradhan	Communist Party of India
1995	Harihar Swain	Indian National Congress
1990	Nityananda Pradhan	Communist Party of India
1985	Radha Govinda Sahu	Indian National Congress
1980	Radha Govinda Sahu	Indian National Congress (I)
1977	Tarini Charan Pattnaik	Janata Party
1974	Sadananda Mohanty	Communist Party of India
1971	Sadananda Mohanty	Communist Party of India
1967	Dandapani Swain	Communist Party of India

== Election results ==
=== 2024 ===
Voting were held on 20 May 2024 in 2nd phase of Odisha Assembly Election & 5th phase of Indian General Election. Counting of votes was on 4 June 2024. In 2024 election, Bharatiya Janata Party candidate Pratap Chandra Nayak defeated Biju Janata Dal candidate Latika Pradhan by a margin of 30,173 votes.

2024 Odisha Vidhan Sabha Election, Kabisuryanagar
Party	Candidate	Votes	%	±%
BJP	Pratap Chandra Nayak	80,995	55.79	
BJD	Latika Pradhan	50,822	35.00	
INC	Sanjaya Kumar Mandal	2,969	2.04	
CPI	Prabin Kumar Das	2,188	1.51	
NOTA	None of the above	2,038	1.4	
Majority		30,173	20.79	
Turnout		1,45,188	60.93	
BJP gain from BJD				

=== 2019 ===
In 2019 election, Biju Janata Dal candidate Latika Pradhan defeated Bharatiya Janata Party candidate Ranjan Polai by a margin of 49,028 votes.

2019 Vidhan Sabha Election, Kabisuryanagar
Party	Candidate	Votes	%	±%
BJD	Latika Pradhan	92,347	62.87	
BJP	Ranjan Polai	43,319	29.49	
INC	Bijaya Kumar Sahu	5,727	3.9	
NOTA	None of the above	2,656	1.81	
Majority		49,028	33.38	
Turnout		1,46,877	64.88	
BJD hold				

=== 2014 ===
In 2014 election, Biju Janata Dal candidate V. Sugnana Kumari Deo defeated Independent candidate Hara Prasad Sahu by a margin of 21,500 votes.

2014 Vidhan Sabha Election, Kabisuryanagar
Party	Candidate	Votes	%	±%
BJD	V. Sugnana Kumari Deo	67,161	50.68	
Independent	Hara Prasad Sahu	45,661	34.45	
INC	Sitaram Panigrahi	9,843	7.43	
BJP	Bishnu Prasad Jena	4,315	3.26	
NOTA	None of the above	2,466	1.86	
Majority		21,500	16.22	
Turnout		1,32,525	64.72	
Registered electors		2,04,764		
BJD hold				

=== 2009 ===
In 2009 election, Biju Janata Dal candidate V. Sugnana Kumari Deo defeated Indian National Congress candidate Kishore Palei by 23,068 votes.

2009 Vidhan Sabha Election, Kabisuryanagar
Party	Candidate	Votes	%	±%
BJD	V. Sugnana Kumari Deo	56,960	56.01	−
INC	Kishor Pallei	33,892	33.33	−
BJP	Prabodh Chandra Panda	5,792	5.70	−
Majority		23,068	22.68 (Note: % of total valid votes)	−
Turnout		1,01,701	54.55	−
BJD hold				
