= Ramchandra Rath =

Indian politician (born 1945)

Member of Parliament, Lok Sabha
- In office 1991–1996
- Preceded by: Ananta Narayan Singh Deo
- Succeeded by: Biju Patnaik
- In office 1977–1984
- Preceded by: Duti Krushna Panda
- Succeeded by: Somanath Rath
- Constituency: Aska, Odisha

Personal details
- Born: 6 April 1945 (age 81) Aska, Odisha, British India
- Party: Indian National Congress
- Spouse: Subhadra Rath

Ramchandra Rath (born 6 April 1945) is an Indian politician. He was elected to the Lok Sabha, the lower house of the Parliament of India as a member of the Indian National Congress.
