= Nityananda Pradhan =

Indian politician

Member: 15th Lok Sabha
- In office 2009–2014
- Preceded by: Harihar Swain
- Succeeded by: Ladu Kishore Swain
- Constituency: Aska

Member: Legislative Assembly of Odisha
- In office 2000–2004
- Preceded by: Harihar Swain
- Succeeded by: Ladu Kishore Swain
- Constituency: Kabisuryanagar
- In office 1990–1995
- Preceded by: Radhagobinda Sahu
- Succeeded by: Harihar Swain

Personal details
- Born: 18 November 1944 (age 81)
- Party: Biju Janata Dal
- Other political affiliations: Communist Party of India
- Spouse: Kamalini Pradhan
- Education: Khallikote Autonomous College
- Profession: Politician

Nityananda Pradhan (born 18 November 1944) is an Indian politician. He was a member of the 15th Lok Sabha, representing Aska (Lok Sabha constituency). He left Communist Party of India and joined Biju Janata Dal (BJD) in 2008. He is a former member of Legislative Assembly of Odisha.

Nityananda Pradhan was denied ticket in 2019 Lok Sabha Elections.

== See also ==
- Indian general election, 2009 (Odisha)
