= Khalikote Assembly constituency =

Constituency of the Odisha legislative assembly in India

Coordinates: 19.61°N 85.08°E

Khallikote
- Constituency No. 126 for the Odisha Legislative Assembly
- Khalikote Assembly constituency in Ganjam district

Constituency details
- Country: India
- Region: East India
- State: Odisha
- Division: Southern Division
- District: Ganjam
- Lok Sabha constituency: Aska
- Established: 1951
- Total electors: 2,33,062 (Note: as on 2024) (Note: as data published by election commission)
- Reservation: SC

Member of Legislative Assembly
- 17th Odisha Legislative Assembly
- Incumbent Purna Chandra Sethy
- Party: Bharatiya Janata Party
- Elected year: 2024

Khallikote is a state legislative constituency of Ganjam district, Odisha, India.

This constituency includes Khallikote, Purusottampur, Khallikote block and ten Gram panchayats (Achuli, Handighar, K.N Pur, Pratappur, Ranajhali, Raipur, Solaghara, Jagannathpur, Baghala, Bhatakumarada, Sunathara, Badabaragam, Bhimpur, Gangadehuni and Jamuni) of Purusottampur block.

== Elected members ==
Vote share of winning candidates
2024	53.82%
2019	59.95%
2014	62.70%
2009	68.07%
2004	57.58%
2000	63.67%
1995	57.68%
1990	59.68%
1985	53.96%
1980	53.37%
1977	64.61%

Since its formation in 1951, 18 elections were held till date including in one bypoll in 1963.

List of members elected from Khallikote constituency are:

Year	Member	Party
2024	Purna Chandra Sethy	Bharatiya Janata Party
2019	Suryamani Baidya	Biju Janata Dal
2014	Purna Chandra Sethy	Biju Janata Dal
2009	Purna Chandra Sethy	Biju Janata Dal
2004	V. Sugnana Kumari Deo	Biju Janata Dal
2000	V. Sugnana Kumari Deo	Biju Janata Dal
1995	V. Sugnana Kumari Deo	Janata Dal
1990	V. Sugnana Kumari Deo	Janata Dal
1985	V. Sugnana Kumari Deo	Janata Party
1980	Trinath Samantray	Indian National Congress (I)
1977	V. Sugnana Kumari Deo	Janata Party
1974	V. Sugnana Kumari Deo	Utkal Congress
1971	Trinath Samantray	Utkal Congress
1967	Narayan Sahu	Samyukta Socialist Party
1963 (bypoll) (Note: Death of Ramchandra Mardaraj Dev)	V. Sugnana Kumari Deo	Indian National Congress
1961	Ramchandra Mardaraj Dev	Indian National Congress
1957	Narayan Sahu	Independent politician
1951	Ramchandra Mardaraj Dev	Independent politician

== Election results ==
=== 2024 ===
Voting were held on 20 May 2024 in 2nd phase of Odisha Assembly Election & 5th phase of Indian General Election. Counting of votes was on 4 June 2024. In 2024 election, Bharatiya Janata Party candidate Purna Chandra Sethy defeated Biju Janata Dal candidate Suryamani Baidya by a margin of 23,057 votes.

2024 Odisha Vidhan Sabha Election, Khalikote
Party	Candidate	Votes	%	±%
BJP	Purna Chandra Sethy	80,230	53.82	
BJD	Suryamani Baidya	57,173	38.36	
INC	Chitra Sen Behera	7,857	5.27	
NOTA	None of the above	3,798	2.55	
Majority		23,057	15.46	
Turnout		1,49,058	63.96	
BJP gain from BJD				

=== 2019 ===
In 2019 election, Biju Janata Dal candidate Suryamani Baidya defeated Bharatiya Janata Party candidate Bharati Behera by a margin of 41,545 votes.

2019 Vidhan Sabha Election, Khalikote
Party	Candidate	Votes	%	±%
BJD	Suryamani Baidya	86,105	59.95	
BJP	Bharati Behera	44,560	31.02	
INC	Bhokali Sethi	6,301	4.39	
NOTA	None of the above	2,312	1.61	
Majority		41,545	28.93	
Turnout		1,43,629	65.92	
BJD hold				

=== 2014 ===
In 2014 election, Biju Janata Dal candidate Purna Chandra Sethy defeated Indian National Congress candidate Pandaba Jalli by a margin of 57.194 votes.

2014 Vidhan Sabha Election, Khalikote
Party	Candidate	Votes	%	±%
BJD	Purna Chandra Sethy	78,845	62.7	▼5.37
INC	Pandaba Jalli	21,651	17.22	▼4.33
BJP	Sarat Chandra Behera	15,382	12.23	▲8.56
NOTA	None of the above	2,397	1.91	−
Majority		57,194	45.48	▼1.04
Turnout		1,25,745	63.84	▲10.38
Registered electors		1,96,972		
BJD hold				

=== 2009 ===
In 2009 election, Biju Janata Dal candidate Purna Chandra Sethy defeated Indian National Congress candidate Kasinath Behera by a margin of 44,629 votes.

2009 Vidhan Sabha Election, Khallikote
Party	Candidate	Votes	%	±%
BJD	Purna Chandra Sethy	65,299	68.07	
INC	Kasinath Behera	20,670	21.55	−
Independent	Gopal Krishna Behera	3,901	4.07	−
BJP	Mina Kumari Tahal	3,520	3.67	−
Majority		44,629	46.52 (Note: % of total valid votes)	−
Turnout		95,931	53.46 (Note: 2004 Voter turnout was 60.25%)	▼6.79
BJD hold				
