= Ladu Kishore Swain =

Indian politician (1947–2019)

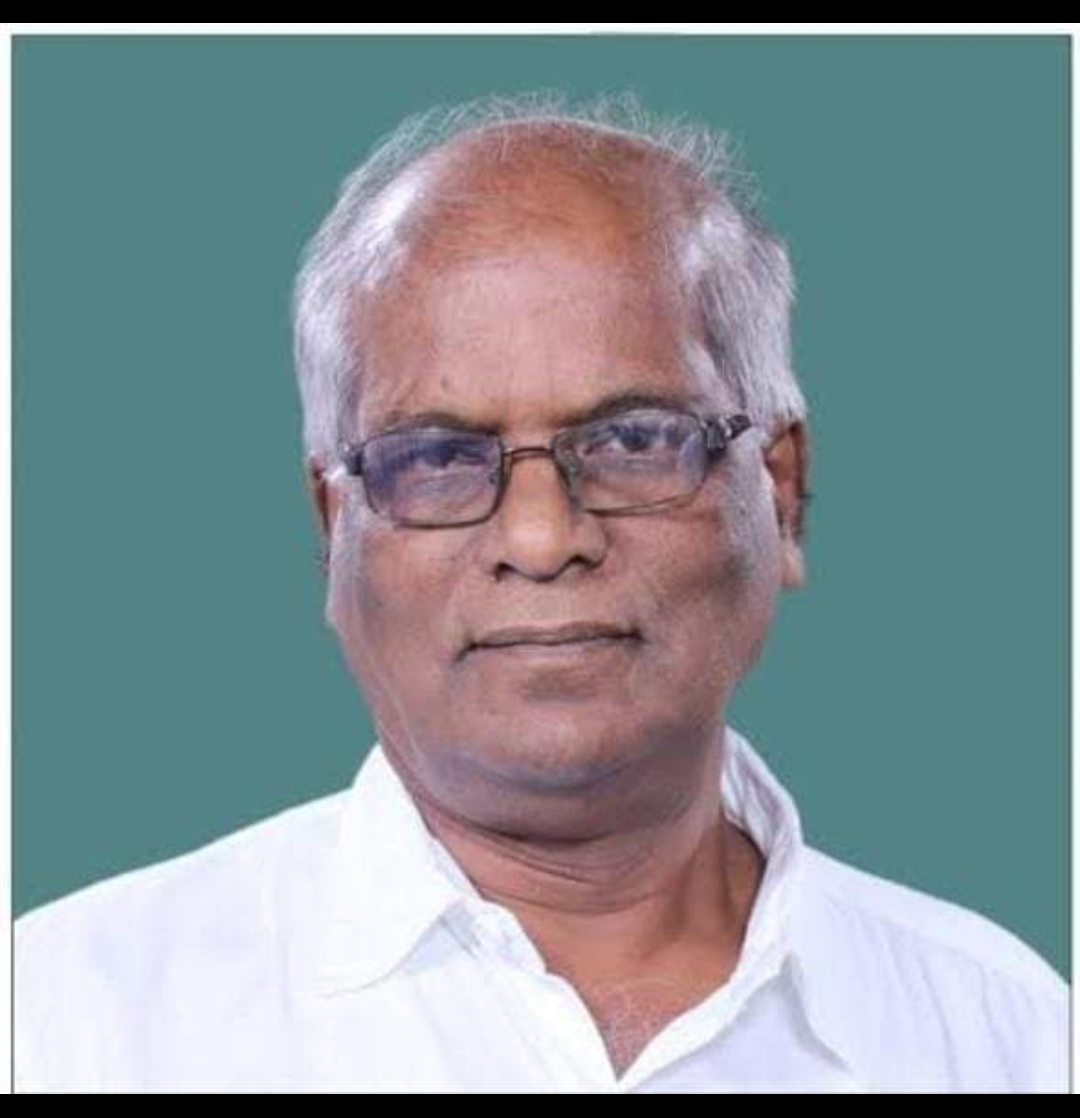
- Portrait of Ladu Kishore Swain

Member: 16th Lok Sabha
- In office 16 May 2014 – 6 February 2019
- Preceded by: Nityananda Pradhan
- Succeeded by: Pramila Bisoyi
- Constituency: Aska

Member: Legislative Assembly of Odisha
- In office 2004–2009
- Preceded by: Nityananda Pradhan
- Succeeded by: V. Sugnana Kumari Deo
- Constituency: Kabisuryanagar

Personal details
- Born: 8 July 1947
- Died: 5 February 2019 (aged 71) Bhubaneswar, Odisha, India
- Party: Biju Janata Dal
- Spouse: Manjula Swain
- Education: Khallikote Autonomous College
- Occupation: Politician

Ladu Kishore Swain (8 July 1947 – 5 February 2019) was an Indian politician who was the Member of Parliament in the Lok Sabha from Aska in the Indian state of Odisha. He was a member of the Biju Janata Dal (BJD) political party. He was a member of the Legislative Assembly of Odisha.

== Positions held ==
- 1984-1990 and 1992 to 1995: Chairman of Panchayat Samiti
- 2002 to 2004: Member of the Zilla Parishad
- 1992 to 1995 : President of CARD Bank
- 2004 to 2009: Member, Odisha Legislative Assembly
- 2014: Elected to 16th Lok Sabha

== Death ==
He died from kidney disease on 5 February 2019, at Apollo Hospital in Bhubaneswar. He is survived by his wife Majula and two children Nachiketa and Aswini.

== See also ==
- Indian general election, 2014 (Odisha)
