= Sitadevi Khadanga =

Indian Odia writer

Sitadevi Khadanga (1902–1983) was an Odia dramatist, novelist, poet and translator from Odisha, India. Her writings mostly set in rural Odisha which depicts social problems of the area in the 20th-century. Her contribution to Odia poetry is considered to be a landmark in Odia literature.

== Life ==
Khadanga was born in 1902 to an orthodox Brahmin family in Asika of Ganjam district. She received no formal education, but was home schooled by a visiting teacher. She was married to a school teacher named Banchhanidhi Khadanga of Gopalpur Sasan, Sorada, Ganjam district. She died in 1983.

== Works ==
Khadanga wrote social dramas during the 1950s which were staged in various places in Ganjam. She established a theatre known as Harihar Natya Mandir, and a literary institute, Krishna Singh Sahitya Parishad, both in Asika.

After her marriage, she began reading plays, and perceived them as a superior literary form. After her children left home for higher education she started writing plays. Her first play was Sahodar (Brother), which was based on her life experiences. It has been described by her as "the story of a woman's life among her husband and children in a middle-class family". Her other plays include Nari (Women), Poshyaputra (Adopted Son), Naisthika (An Orthodox), Prachin Panthi (Old-fashioned), Kshudhara Pida (The Pain of Hunger) and Matrihina (Motherless). Her play Mandir Prabesh deals with the rights of Harijan (Dalits) to enter Hindu temples.

Khadanga's first novel was an adoption of her own play Poshyaputra, which is based on a variety of problems in society. Agraja (Elder Brother), containing 27 chapters, is a socio-political novel. Pratyabartan (Return; 1969) is based on rural life in Orissa. Mora Jeevan Smriti (Memories of My Life; 1978) is an autobiography. She translated Rabindranath Tagore's Ghare Baire from Bengali into Odia. She also wrote poems which played a significant role in the cultural renaissance of Odisha. Her contribution to Odia poetry is considered to be a landmark in Odia literature.
