= Aska Lok Sabha constituency =

Lok Sabha Constituency in Odisha, India

Coordinates: 19.620277°N 84.664078°E

Aska OD-19
- Lok Sabha constituency
- Interactive Map Outlining Aska Lok Sabha constituency

Constituency details
- Country: India
- Region: East India
- State: Odisha
- Assembly constituencies: Polasara; Kabisuryanagar; Khallikote; Aska; Surada; Sanakhemundi; Hinjili
- Established: 1952
- Total electors: 16,23,404 (Note: as on 2024) (Note: as data published by election commission)
- Reservation: None

Member of Parliament
- 18th Lok Sabha
- Incumbent Anita Subhadarshini
- Party: BJP
- Elected year: 2024

Aska Lok Sabha constituency is one of the 21 Lok Sabha (parliamentary) constituencies in Odisha state in eastern India.

== Assembly Segments ==
Presently, after the delimitation of parliamentary constituencies in 2008, the following 7 Legislative Assembly segments constitute Aska Lok Sabha constituency:

#	Name	District	Member	Party	Leading (in 2024)
124	Polasara	Ganjam	Gokulananda Mallik	BJP	BJP
125	Kabisuryanagar	Ganjam	Pratap Chandra Nayak	BJP	BJP
126	Khallikote (SC)	Ganjam	Purna Chandra Sethy	BJP	BJP
128	Aska	Ganjam	Saroj Kumar Padhi	BJP	BJP
129	Surada	Ganjam	Nilamani Bisoyi	BJP	BJP
130	Sanakhemundi	Ganjam	Ramesh Chandra Jena	INC	BJD
131	Hinjili	Ganjam	Naveen Patnaik	BJD	BJP

== Elected members ==
Vote share of winning candidates
2024	48.55%
2019	54.52%
2014	38.44%
2009	32.64%
2004	56.10%
2000 (bypoll)	70.31%
1999	74.91%
1998	53.89%
1997 (bypoll)	56.64%
1996	54.14%
1991	47.83%
1989	60.45%
1984	60.76%
1980	49.94%
1977	41.79%

Since its formation in 1952, 19 elections have been held to date, including by-elections in 1997 and 2000.

List of members elected from the Aska constituency:

Members of Parliament representing Aska
Year	Member	Party
As Ghumusar Constituency
1952	Uma Charan Patnaik	Independent
1956–1961: Constituency did not exist
As Bhanjanagar Constituency
1962	Mohan Nayak	Indian National Congress
1967	Ananta Tripathi Sarma	Indian National Congress
1971	Duti Krushna Panda	Communist Party of India
As Aska Constituency
1977	Rama Chandra Rath	Indian National Congress
1980	Rama Chandra Rath	Indian National Congress (I)
1984	Somanath Rath	Indian National Congress
1989	Ananta Narayan Singh Deo	Janata Dal
1991	Rama Chandra Rath	Indian National Congress
1996	Biju Patnaik	Janata Dal
1997 (bypoll) (Note: By-election necessitated by the death of Biju Patnaik.)	Naveen Patnaik	Janata Dal
1998	Naveen Patnaik	Biju Janata Dal
1999	Naveen Patnaik	Biju Janata Dal
2000 (bypoll) (Note: By-election necessitated by the resignation of Naveen Patnaik after he became the Chief Minister of Odisha.)	Kumudini Patnaik	Biju Janata Dal
2004	Hari Har Swain	Biju Janata Dal
2009	Nityananda Pradhan	Biju Janata Dal
2014	Ladu Kishore Swain	Biju Janata Dal
2019	Pramila Bisoyi	Biju Janata Dal
2024	Anita Subhadarshini	Bharatiya Janata Party

== Election Results ==
=== 2024 ===
Voting were held on 20th May 2024 in 5th phase of Indian General Election. Counting of votes was on 4th June 2024. In 2024 election, Bharatiya Janata Party candidate Anita Subhadarshini defeated Biju Janata Dal candidate Ranjita Sahu by a margin of 99,974 votes.

2024 Indian general election: Aska
Party	Candidate	Votes	%	±%
BJP	Anita Subhadarshini	494,226	48.55	
BJD	Ranjita Sahu	3,94,252	38.73	
INC	Debakanta Sarma	75,255	7.39	
NOTA	None of the above	21,941	2.16	
Majority		99,974	9.82	
Turnout		10,18,539	62.74	
BJP gain from BJD				

=== 2019 ===
In 2019 election, Biju Janata Dal candidate Pramila Bisoyi defeated Bharatiya Janata Party candidate Anita Subhadarshini by a margin of 2,04,707 votes.

2019 Indian general elections: Aska
Party	Candidate	Votes	%	±%
BJD	Pramila Bisoyi	552,749	54.52	▼5.89
BJP	Anita Subhadarshini	3,48,042	34.33	▲26.81
CPI	Rama Krushna Panda	59,978	5.92	
NOTA	None of the above	17,344	1.71	
BSP	Purna Chandra Nayak	8,549	0.84	
Majority		2,04,707	20.19	
Turnout		10,13,890	65.79	
BJD hold				

=== 2014 ===
In 2014 election, Biju Janata Dal candidate Ladu Kishore Swain defeated Indian National Congress candidate Srilokanath Rath by a margin of 3,11,997 votes.

2014 Indian general elections: Aska
Party	Candidate	Votes	%	±%
BJD	Ladu Kishore Swain	541,473	60.41	
INC	Srilokanath Rath	2,29,476	25.60	
BJP	Mahesh Chandra Mohanty	67,361	7.52	
NOTA	None of the above	15,382	1.72	−
AAP	Prabhat Kumar Mohanty	11,063	1.23	
BSP	Bijaya Kumar Mahapatro	9,127	1.02	
Majority		3,11,997	34.81	−
Turnout		8,96,461	63.63	
Registered electors		14,08,780		
BJD hold				

=== 2009 ===
In 2009 election, Biju Janata Dal candidate Nityananda Pradhan defeated Indian National Congress candidate Ramchandra Rath by a margin of 2,32,834 votes.

2009 Indian general elections: Aska
Party	Candidate	Votes	%	±%
BJD	Nityananda Pradhan	419,862	59.81	
INC	Ramchandra Rath	1,87,028	26.64	
BJP	Shanti Devi	42,165	6.01	
Majority		2,32,834	33.17	
Turnout		7,01,880	54.57	
BJD hold				
