= Tara Tarini Mandir =

Hindu temple in Odisha, India

Tara Tarini Pitha
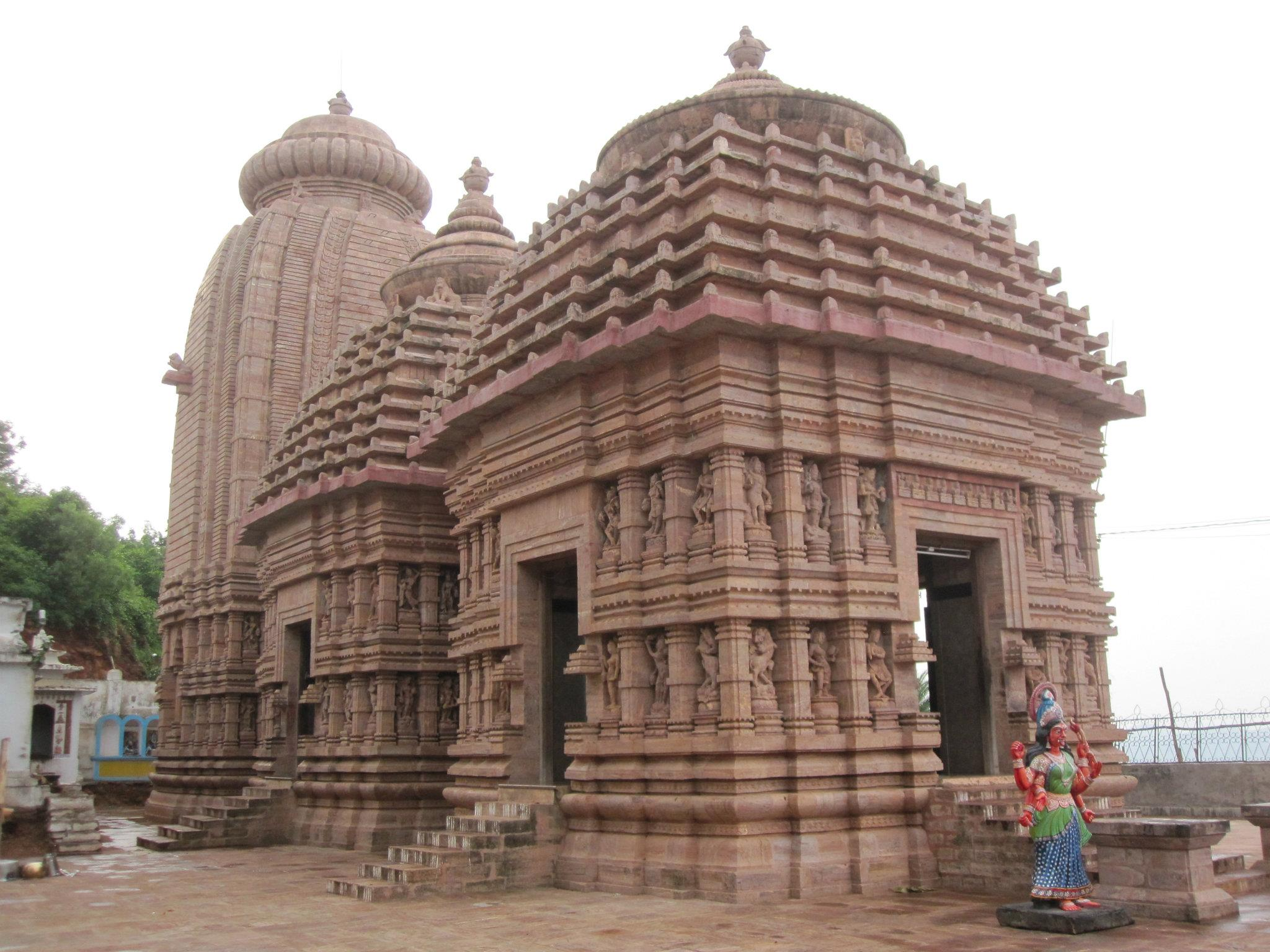

- Location: Purushottampur, near Brahmapur city, Ganjam district, Odisha, India Tara Tarini Mandir (India)

Religion
- Affiliation: Hinduism
- District: Ganjam
- Deity: Tara & Tarini
- Festivals: Chaitra Mela/Chaitra Parba/Chaitra Jatra, Dola Parba, Dusshera, Navaratri, Dipabali, and Sankranti

Location
- Location: Kumari Hills, Purushottampur
- State: Odisha
- Country: India
- Coordinates: 19°29′22.83″N 84°53′59.23″E

Architecture
- Type: Kalinga Architecture
- Creator: Kalinga Emperors in Ancient Period, Basupraharaj in Medieval Period in 17th century and Tara Tarini Development Board at present
- Temple: Five
- Inscriptions: Two - At the Foot Hill of the Shrine (Shiva Temple)

Website
- http://taratarini.nic.in/

Tara Tarini Pitha (Odia: ତାରାତାରିଣୀ ପୀଠ, romanized: Tārā-Tāriṇī Pīṭha) is a Hindu temple of Adi Shakti and one of the Adi Shakti Pithas, at the Kumari hills on the bank of Rushikulya river near Purushottampur in Ganjam district of Odisha, around 28 km from Brahmapur city.

== Description of temple ==
The main idols inside the garbhagriha are two stone female faces adorned with gold and silver ornaments. Two brass heads representing their Chalanti Pratima are in between. There is also a small murti of the Buddha in the garbhagriha.

== Legends ==
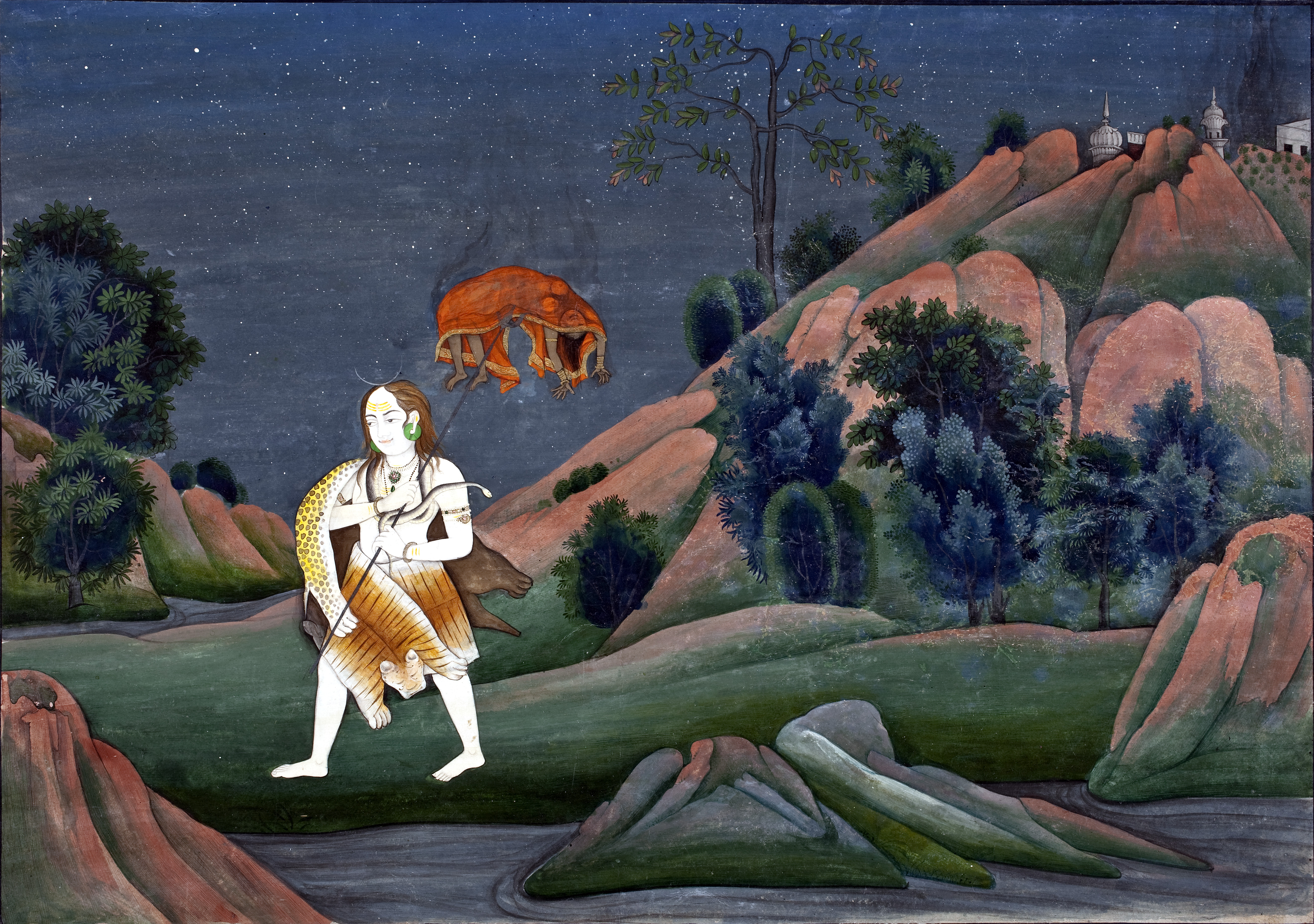
Shiva carrying the corpse of Sati Devi

It is believed that the Shakti Pithas are the locations where the body parts of Maa Sati fell, after being cut by Sudarshana Chakra of Lord Vishnu during the events of the Daksha yajna. It is said that Tara Tarini Mandir is located where Maa Sati's breasts fell.

The temple is one of the four Adi Shakti Pithas: the others being the Kamakhya Temple where the genitals fell, the Vimala Temple where the feet fell, and the Kalighat Temple where the toes of the right foot fell.

== Festivals ==
=== Chaitra Jatra ===
Chaitra Jatra, also known as Tara Tarini Jatra takes place on the Tuesdays (or Maṅgaḷabāra) of the Hindu month of Chaitra. Devotees believe that getting their children tonsured is auspicious during this period. Hundreds of barbers are kept near the temple to aid the devotees. During this festivity, special Khechidi Bhoga is served to the deities which later sold to devotees for ₹7 per serving from Monday midnight till 6 PM Tuesday.

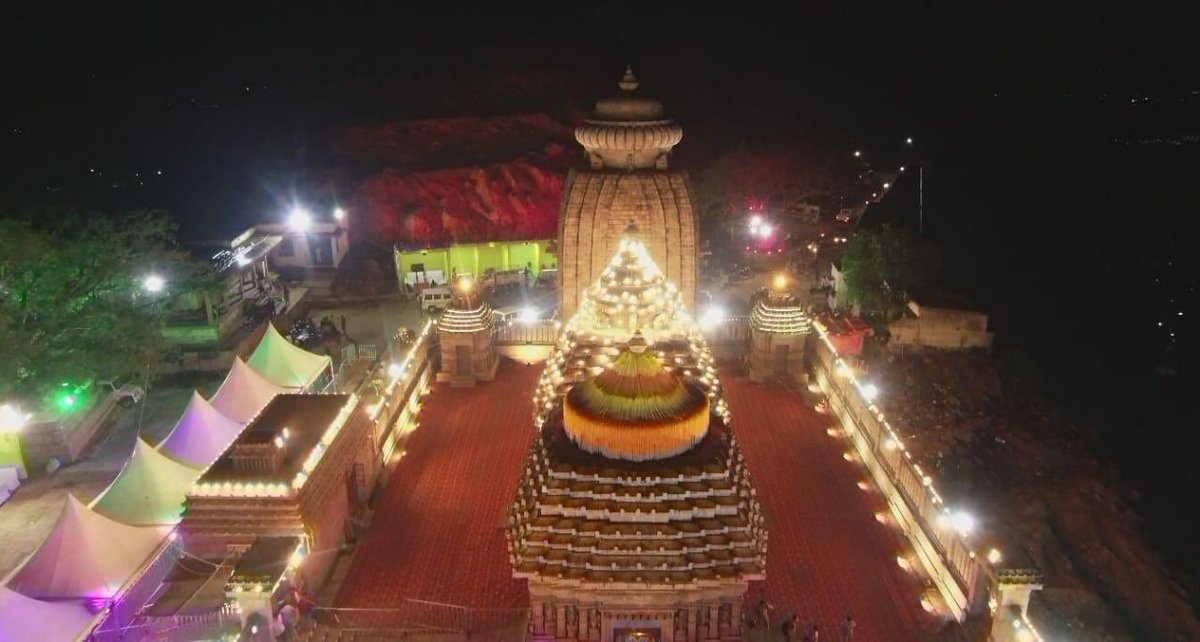
Tara Tarini Mandir during Chaitra Jatra

=== Sankranti Mela ===
The Sankranti Mela is held on each Sankranti, i.e every 1st day of the each Hindu month. This day is considered to be very auspicious for Tantra Sadhakas. The temple stays open from 5:30 AM to 10 PM for the darshan of the deities. Offerings are not allowed inside the garbhagriha during the festival, they are offered to the Bije Pratima which is kept on the special Bije Pithastal during the festival, located near the temple's gate. Special khechudi bhoga prepared and sold to devotees for ₹7 per packet by the temple trust.

Special pujas are done in the mandir.

== See also ==
- Shaktism
- Shakti Pitha
- Sati
