= Manjula Swain =

Indian politician

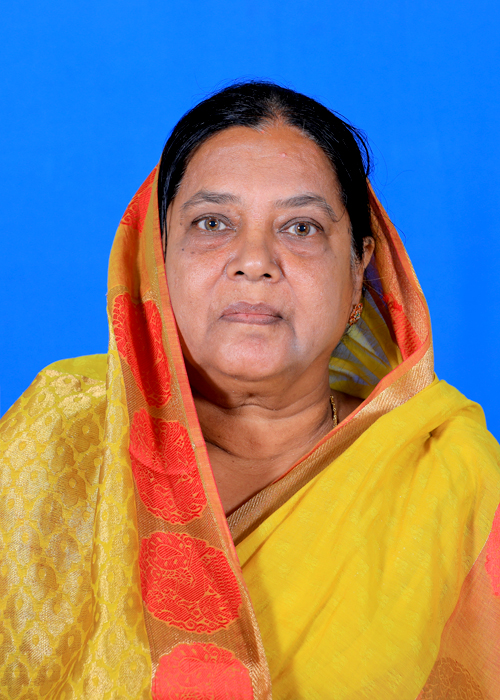

Member of the Odisha Legislative Assembly
- Incumbent
- Assumed office 2019
- Preceded by: Debaraj Mohanty
- Constituency: Aska

Personal details
- Party: Biju Janata Dal

Manjula Swain is an Indian politician. She was elected to the Odisha Legislative Assembly from Aska as a member of the Biju Janata Dal.
