= Kumudini Patnaik =

Indian politician

- କୁମୁଦିନୀ ପଟ୍ଟନାୟକ

Member: 13th Lok Sabha
- In office 2000–2004
- Preceded by: Naveen Patnaik
- Succeeded by: Hari Har Swain
- Constituency: Aska

Personal details
- Born: 7 July 1945 (age 80)
- Party: BJD
- Other political affiliations: Indian National Congress
- Spouse: Ramakrushna Patnaik
- Children: 4 daughters

Kumudini Patnaik (born 7 July 1945) is an Indian Politician and was elected to the Lok Sabha the lower house of Indian Parliament from Aska, Odisha in 2000 in a bye election as a member of the Biju Janata Dal. But she was expelled from the Biju Janata Dal and she later joined the Congress but lost the Aska seat to Harihar Swain in 2004 and later quit the Congress and joined the BJP.
