= Latika Pradhan =

Indian politician

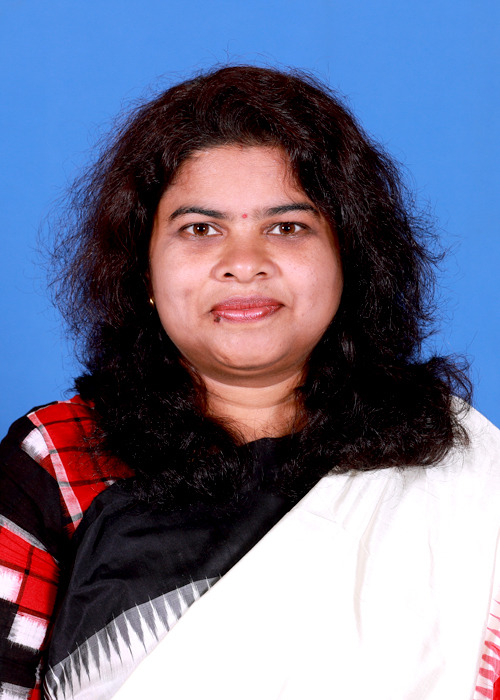

Member of the Odisha Legislative Assembly
- In office 2019–2024
- Preceded by: V. Sugnana Kumari Deo
- Succeeded by: Pratap Chandra Nayak
- Constituency: Kabisuryanagar

Personal details
- Born: 25 April 1975 (age 51)
- Party: Biju Janata Dal

Latika Pradhan (born 25 April 1975) is an Indian politician. She was elected to the Odisha Legislative Assembly from Kabisuryanagar as a member of the Biju Janata Dal.
