= Purna Chandra Sethy =

Indian politician

Member of the Odisha Legislative Assembly
- Incumbent
- Assumed office 4 June 2024
- Preceded by: Suryamani Baidya
- Constituency: Khalikote

Personal details
- Party: Bharatiya Janata Party
- Profession: Politician, social worker

Purna Chandra Sethy is an Indian politician and social worker from Odisha. He serves as a member of the Odisha Legislative Assembly from Khalikote representing the Bharatiya Janata Party (BJP).

== Political career ==
Sethy was elected to the Odisha Legislative Assembly from Khalikote in the 2024 Odisha Legislative Assembly election as a candidate of the Bharatiya Janata Party.

His election affidavit, publicly available through MyNeta, includes disclosures relating to his assets, liabilities and educational background, as required for election candidates in India.
