= Harihar Swain =

Indian politician

Member: 14th Lok Sabha
- Preceded by: Kumudini Patnaik
- Succeeded by: Nityananda Pradhan
- Constituency: Aska

Personal details
- Born: 11 November 1939 Debabhumi, Aska Ganjam, Orissa
- Died: 13 October 2012 (aged 76) New Delhi, India
- Party: BJD
- Spouse: Kanaka Swain
- Children: 1 Son And 4 Daughters
- As of 22 September, 2006

Harihar Swain (11 November 1939 – 13 October 2012) was a member of the 14th Lok Sabha of India. He represented the Aska constituency of Odisha on a Biju Janata Dal ticket. He was expelled from the Biju Janata Dal after voting against the party whip. It was alleged that he had taken a bribe to vote against his own party. He was suffering from multiple ailments and died on 13 October 2012.
