= Purusottampur =

- Town
- Location in Odisha, India Purusottampur (India)
- Coordinates: 19.53°N 84.88°E
- Country: India
- State: Odisha
- District: Ganjam
- Founder: Gajapati Purushottama Deva

Government
  - Type: N.A.C.
  - Body: Purushottampur N.A.C.
- Elevation: 19 m (62 ft)

Population (2011)
  - Total: 15,366

Languages
  - Official: Odia
- Time zone: UTC+5:30 (IST)
- PIN: 761018
- Telephone code: 06811
- Vehicle registration: OR-07/OD-07
- Sex ratio: 800 ♂/♀
- Website: odisha.gov.in

Purusottampur (also spelt as Purushottampur) is a town and a Notified Area Council in Ganjam district in the Indian state of Odisha.

== Geography ==
Purusottampur is located at 19.53°N 84.88°E. It has an average elevation of 19 metres (62 ft).

== Demographics ==
According to the 2001 India census, Purusottampur had a population of 14,249, including 51% males and 49% females. Purusottampur has an average literacy rate of 61%, higher than the national average of 59.5%: male literacy is 71%, and female literacy is 50%. 13% of the population is under 6 years of age.

Religion in Purusottampur
Hinduism	99.75%
Islam	0.16%
Christianity	0.01%
Sikh	0.01%
Buddhist	0.00%
Jain	0.00%
Not Stated	0.07%
Other	0.00%

== Climate and regional setting ==
Maximum summer temperature is 37 °C; minimum winter temperature is 17 °C. The mean daily temperature varies from 33 °C to 38 °C. May is the hottest month; December is the coldest. The average annual rainfall is 1250 mm and the region receives monsoon and torrential rainfall from July to October.

Climate data for Purushottampur, Odisha
Month	Jan	Feb	Mar	Apr	May	Jun	Jul	Aug	Sep	Oct	Nov	Dec	Year
Mean daily maximum °C (°F)	27 (81)	30 (86)	34 (93)	36 (97)	37 (99)	34 (93)	32 (90)	31 (88)	32 (90)	32 (90)	30 (86)	28 (82)	32 (90)
Mean daily minimum °C (°F)	16 (61)	19 (66)	23 (73)	27 (81)	29 (84)	28 (82)	27 (81)	27 (81)	26 (79)	23 (73)	20 (68)	16 (61)	23 (74)
Average rainfall cm (inches)	1.20 (0.47)	1.70 (0.67)	1.90 (0.75)	1.50 (0.59)	4.00 (1.57)	15.00 (5.91)	28.20 (11.10)	27.30 (10.75)	18.00 (7.09)	9.30 (3.66)	3.30 (1.30)	1.90 (0.75)	113.3 (44.61)
Source: MSM Weather

== Educational Institutions ==
- Tara Tarini College
- Narasingh Das (N.D.) High School
- Govt. Girl's High School
- Kumari Upper Primary School
- Kapileswar Sasan School
- Sunshine International School
- Little Angles International School

== Attractions and Sites ==
- Tara Tarini Temple - One among four ancient Shakta pithas on Kumari hills at the bank of River Rushikulya. Many devotees visit the temple on the Tuesdays of hindu month Chaitra.
- Jaugada (Samapa) - Ancient capital of Kalinga having ruins of fort and a site for tourist attraction for Edicts of Ashoka.
- Sri Kaleswar Temple of Badakharida
- Dakhineswar Kali of Pratapur
- Biju Patnaik Children's Park
- Surya Namaskar (Sun Salutation with Steps)
- Thakurani Jatra (Kala kunja, Roadshows,Free meals,Bana Jatra,etc)
- Danda Nata (21days)
- Ganesh Puja (Day 1,5,7,9,11)
- Gajalaxmi Puja (Chandi Medha)

== Politics ==
Purushottampur block and N.A.C. are part of Khalikote Assembly constituency and Kabisuryanagar Assembly constituency. It is a part of Aska (Lok Sabha constituency).
