= Jhadeswar Institute of Engineering & Technology, Balasore =

Private engineering school in Odisha, India

JIET, Balasore
- Type: Private
- Established: 2009
- Accreditation: State Council for Technical Education & Vocational Training, AICTE
- Chairman: Paramananda Santara
- Location: Balasore, Odisha, India; 21.4909°N 86.8677°E
- Campus: Barchikhunta(Sutei badgaon), Chhanpur, Balasore
- Website: www.jietorissa.org

The Jhadeswar Institute of Engineering & Technology(JIET), Balasore is a private run diploma engineering school established in 2009 by Jhadeswar Educational Trust. Jhadeswar Educational Trust has also have established an ITC in 2007. It is now affiliated to SCTE & VT, Odisha and also approved by AICTE.

== Campus ==
It is located just 1.5 km (0.93 mi) away from National Highway 5A. It is located 5 km (3.1 mi) from Balasore town and 6 km (3.7 mi) from Balasore railway station and bus stop.

== Facilities ==
The institution gives a basic need facility to its students. It provides bus and hostel facilities to all its students and also has a well maintained canteen inside the campus with hygienic food cooking faculty. The institution has a library with insufficient books for students syllabus and curriculum.

== Courses offered ==
It offers three year diploma engineering course under the curriculum of SCTE & VT.

- Mechanical engineering
- Electrical engineering
- Civil engineering
- Electronics and telecommunication engineering

== Admission procedure ==
Students can get admission through Diploma Entrance Test conducted by SCTE & VT after matriculation. Also students can get admission in lateral after ITI or +2 Sc. directly to the third semester.

== Controversy ==
JIET also found involved in cyber crime. In 2010, the institution was found guilty in hacking of DET Orissa website and auto choice of students to select JIET. In an e-counselling process, almost 32 students suffered from that and complained. When the authorities investigate, the principal of JIET was responsible.
