= Berhampur Lok Sabha constituency =

Constituency of the Indian parliament in Odisha

Coordinates: 19.315316°N 84.792338°E

Berhampur OD-20
- Lok Sabha constituency
- Interactive Map Outlining Berhampur Lok Sabha constituency

Constituency details
- Country: India
- Region: East India
- State: Odisha
- Assembly constituencies: Chhatrapur; Gopalpur; Brahmapur; Digapahandi; Chikiti; Mohana; Paralakhemundi
- Established: 1952
- Total electors: 15,95,228 (Note: as on 2024) (Note: as data published by election commission)
- Reservation: None

Member of Parliament
- 18th Lok Sabha
- Incumbent Pradeep Kumar Panigrahy
- Party: BJP
- Elected year: 2024

Brahmapur is a Lok Sabha parliamentary constituency in Odisha, India. Former prime minister PV Narishama Rao represented it in 1996.

== Assembly Segments ==
Constituency number	Name	District	Member	Party	Leading (in 2024)
127	Chhatrapur (SC)	Ganjam	Krushna Chandra Nayak	BJP	BJP
132	Gopalpur	Ganjam	Bibhuti Bhushan Jena	BJP	BJP
133	Brahmapur	Ganjam	K. Anil Kumar	BJP	BJP
134	Digapahandi	Ganjam	Sidhant Mohapatra	BJP	BJP
135	Chikiti	Ganjam	Manoranjan Dyan Samantara	BJP	BJP
136	Mohana (ST)	Gajapati	Dasarathi Gomango	INC	BJP
137	Paralakhemundi	Gajapati	Rupesh Kumar Panigrahi	BJD	BJP

== Elected members ==
Since its formation in 1952, 19 elections have been held till date including one bypoll in 1961. It was a two member constituency in 1957. List of members elected from Berhampur constituency are

Year	Winner	Party
As Ganjam Constituency
1952	Bijay Chandra Das	Communist Party of India
1957 (Note: It was a 2 member constituency)	Uma Charan Patnaik	Independent
1957	Mohan Nayak	Indian National Congress
1961 (bypoll) (Note: Death of Uma Charan Patnaik)	Ananta Tripathi Sarma	Indian National Congress
As Chatrapur Constituency
1962	Ananta Tripathi Sarma	Indian National Congress
1967	R. Jagannath Rao	Indian National Congress
1971	R. Jagannath Rao	Indian National Congress
As Berhampur Constituency
1977	R. Jagannath Rao	Indian National Congress
1980	R. Jagannath Rao	Indian National Congress (I)
1984	R. Jagannath Rao	Indian National Congress
1989	Gopinath Gajapati Narayan Deo	Indian National Congress
1991	Gopinath Gajapati Narayan Deo	Indian National Congress
1996	P. V. Narasimha Rao	Indian National Congress
1998	Jayanti Patnaik	Indian National Congress
1999	Anadi Charan Sahu	Bharatiya Janata Party
2004	Chandra Sekhar Sahu	Indian National Congress
2009	Sidhant Mohapatra	Biju Janata Dal
2014	Sidhant Mohapatra	Biju Janata Dal
2019	Chandra Sekhar Sahu	Biju Janata Dal
2024	Pradeep Kumar Panigrahy	Bharatiya Janata Party

== Election results ==
Vote share of Winning candidates
2024	49.20%
2019	44.83%
2014	43.97%
2009	44.99%
2004	49.48%
1999	54.46%
1998	49.05%
1996	62.57%
1991	51.96%
1989	49.35%
1984	67.86%
1980	65.68%
1977	57.82%
1971	60.33%
1967	53.11%
1962	60.16%
1961 (By-Poll)	60.93%
1957	22.00%
1957	23.38%
1952	55.61%

=== 2024 ===
Voting were held on 13 May 2024 in 4th phase of Indian General Election. Counting of votes was on 4 June 2024. In 2024 election, Bharatiya Janata Party candidate Pradeep Kumar Panigrahy defeated Biju Janata Dal candidate Bhrugu Baxipatra by a margin of 1,65,476 votes.

2024 Indian general election: Berhampur
Party	Candidate	Votes	%	±%
BJP	Pradeep Kumar Panigrahy	513,102	49.20	▲13.94
BJD	Bhrugu Baxipatra	3,47,626	33.33	▼11.51
INC	Rashmi Ranjan Patnaik	1,29,744	12.44	▼1.91
NOTA	None of the above	15,942	1.53	
Majority		1,65,476	15.87	
Turnout		10,46,688	65.61	
BJP gain from BJD				

=== 2019 ===
In 2019 election, Biju Janata Dal candidate Chandra Sekhar Sahu defeated Bharatiya Janata Party candidate Bhrugu Baxipatra by a margin of 94,844 votes.

2019 Indian general election: Berhampur
Party	Candidate	Votes	%	±%
BJD	Chandra Sekhar Sahu	443,843	44.83	
BJP	Bhrugu Baxipatra	348,999	35.25	
INC	V. Chandrasekhar Naidu	142,632	14.41	
NOTA	None of the Above	14,381	1.45	
OPD (Note: Odisha Pragati Dal)	Srihari Patnaik	8,304	0.84	
SUCI(C)	Somanath Behera	8,296	0.84	
BSP	Tirupathi Rao Karanam	8,290	0.84	
IND	K. Shyambabu Subudhi	8,084	0.82	
IND	Chakradhar Sahu	7,081	0.72	
Majority		94,844	9.58	
Turnout				
BJD hold		Swing		

=== 2014 ===
In 2014 election, Biju Janata Dal candidate Sidhant Mohapatra defeated Indian National Congress candidate Chandra Sekhar Sahu by a margin of 1,27,720 votes.

2014 Indian general election: Berhampur
Party	Candidate	Votes	%	±%
BJD	Sidhant Mohapatra	398,107	43.97	
INC	Chandra Sekhar Sahu	270,387	29.87	
BJP	Rama Chandra Panda	158,811	17.54	
CPI(M)	Ali Kishor Patnaik	35,968	3.97	
NOTA	None of the Above	12,706	1.40	
IND	3 Independent Candidates	11,183	1.24	
OTH	4 Other Party Candidates	18,200	2.01	
Majority		127,720	14.10	
Turnout		9,05,933	67.90	
BJD hold		Swing		

=== 2009 ===
In 2009 election, Biju Janata Dal candidate Sidhant Mohapatra defeated Indian National Congress candidate Chandra Sekhar Sahu by a margin of 57,287 votes.

2009 Indian general election: Berhampur
Party	Candidate	Votes	%	±%
BJD	Sidhant Mohapatra	319,839	44.99	
INC	Chandra Sekhar Sahu	262,552	36.93	
BJP	Bharat Paik	78,929	11.10	
BSP	Pabitra Gamango	14,186	2.00	
IND	4 Independent Candidates	28,558	4.02	
OTH	1 Other Party Candidate	6,859	0.96	
Majority		57,287	8.06	
Turnout				
Swing to BJD from INC		Swing		

=== 2004 ===
2004 Indian general election: Berhampur
Party	Candidate	Votes	%	±%
INC	Chandra Sekhar Sahu	355,973	49.48	
BJP	Anadi Sahu	304,316	42.30	
IND	Jaganath Patro	34,032	4.73	
IND	K. Shyambabu Subudhi	25,058	3.48	
Majority		51,657	7.18	
Turnout		719,379		
Swing to INC from BJP		Swing		

=== 1999 ===
1999 Indian general election: Berhampur
Party	Candidate	Votes	%	±%
BJP	Anadicharan Sahu	310,704	54.46	
INC	Jayanti Patnaik	256,581	44.97	
IND	Katakota Shyambabu Subudhi	3,271	0.57	
Majority		54,123	9.49	
Turnout		580,577	50.07	
Swing to BJP from INC		Swing		

=== 1998 ===
1998 Indian general election: Berhampur
Party	Candidate	Votes	%	±%
INC	Jayanti Patnaik	271,044	49.05	
BJP	Gopinath Gajapati Narayan Deo	235,804	42.68	
CPI(M)	Ali Kishore Pattanayak	36,606	6.62	
RJD	Aliya Begum	5,073	0.92	
AJBP (Note: Ajeya Bharat Party)	K. Shyambabu Subudhi	2,594	0.47	
IND	Dhanu Sahoo	1,433	0.26	
Majority		35,240	6.38	
Turnout		564,119	50.76	
INC hold		Swing		

=== 1996 ===
1996 Indian general election: Berhampur
Party	Candidate	Votes	%	±%
INC	P. V. Narasimha Rao	340,555	62.57	
JD	V. Sugnana Kumari Deo	172,015	31.61	
IND	11 Independent Candidates	31,666	5.80	
Majority		168,540	30.96	
Turnout		558,038	53.19	
INC hold		Swing		

=== 1991 ===
1991 Indian general election: Berhampur
Party	Candidate	Votes	%	±%
INC	Gopinath Gajapathi Narayan Deo	235,260	51.96	
JD	Surjya Narayan Patro	161,436	35.65	
BJP	Bipin Bihary Ratho	32,938	7.27	
JP	Damodar Patra	10,593	2.34	
DDP	S. Pandaba	1,980	0.44	
IND	6 Independent Candidates	10,568	2.33	
Majority		73,824	16.31	
Turnout		464,429	49.54	
INC hold		Swing		

=== 1989 ===
1989 Indian general election: Berhampur
Party	Candidate	Votes	%	±%
INC	Gopinath Gajapathi Narayan Deo	232,082	49.35	
JD	Surjya Narayan Patro	217,336	46.21	
IND	Brundaban Khatai	11,279	2.40	
IND	Rama Chandra Sahu	9,618	2.05	
Majority		14,746	3.14	
Turnout		486,137	52.14	
INC hold		Swing		

=== 1984 ===
1984 Indian general election: Berhampur
Party	Candidate	Votes	%	±%
INC	R. Jagannath Rao	235,466	67.86	
JP	Surjya Narayan Patra	90,606	26.11	
IND	Rama Chandra Sahu	10,583	3.05	
IND	K. Tulasi Rao	10,349	2.98	
Majority		144,860	41.75	
Turnout		358,221	50.42	
INC hold		Swing		

=== 1980 ===
1980 Indian general election: Berhampur
Party	Candidate	Votes	%	±%
INC(I)	R. Jagannath Rao	158,990	65.68	
JP(S)	Ramanath Das	44,820	18.52	
JP	Narayan Patra	27,975	11.56	
IND	Venkata Ramana Tata	10,276	4.25	
Majority		114,170	47.16	
Turnout		252,858	38.20	
INC(I) hold		Swing		

=== 1977 ===
1977 Indian general election: Berhampur
Party	Candidate	Votes	%	±%
INC	R. Jagannath Rao	119,132	57.82	
JP	Varahagiri Shanker Giri	69,043	33.51	
IND	Venkata Ramana Tata	10,483	5.09	
IND	Amaresh Prasad Misra	7,381	3.58	
Majority		50,089	24.31	
Turnout		214,711	35.37	
INC hold		Swing		

=== 1971 ===
1971 Indian general election: Chatrapur
Party	Candidate	Votes	%	±%
INC	Jaganath Rao R.	150,279	60.33	
Utkal Congress	Brundaban Naiyak	64,346	25.83	
IND	Jaganath Mishra	22,956	9.22	
INC(O)	Ananta Tripathi Sarma	11,534	4.63	
Majority		85,933	34.50	
Turnout		259,232	46.30	
INC hold		Swing		

=== 1967 ===
1967 Indian general election: Chatrapur
Party	Candidate	Votes	%	±%
INC	J. R. Rachakonda	107,071	53.11	
SWA	J. Praharaja	65,410	32.44	
IND	C. Patro	15,184	7.53	
IND	S. Misra	13,954	6.92	
Majority		41,661	20.67	
Turnout		212,036	41.69	
INC hold		Swing		

=== 1962 ===
1962 Indian general election: Chatrapur
Party	Candidate	Votes	%	±%
INC	Sarma Ananta Tripathy	47,958	60.16	
SWA	Harihara Das	22,743	28.53	
Socialist	Naryan Sahu	9,013	11.31	
Majority		25,215	31.63	
Turnout		82,677	20.01	
INC hold		Swing		

=== 1961 by-election ===
1961 by-election: Chatrapur
Party	Candidate	Votes	%	±%
INC	A. T. Sarma	101,184	60.93	
AIGP	J. Misra	48,616	29.27	
IND	G. Rath	16,277	9.80	
Majority		52,568	31.65	
Turnout				

=== 1957 ===
1957 Indian general election: Ganjam (2 seats)
Party	Candidate	Votes	%	±%
INC	Mohan Nayak	127,558	23.38	
IND	Uma Charan Patnaik	120,057	22.00	
INC	Ganesh Mahapatra	110,405	20.24	
IND	Sapua Naik	75,971	13.92	
AIGP	Satananda Padhi	62,251	11.41	
AIGP	Iswar Naik	49,348	9.04	
Majority		7,501	1.38	
Turnout		545,590	36.29	

=== 1952 ===
1951–52 Indian general election: Ganjam South
Party	Candidate	Votes	%	±%
CPI	Bijoy Chandra Das	61,002	55.61	
IND	Dataram Varaha Narsingh Rao	28,524	26.00	
IND	Sadananda Padhi	20,169	18.39	
Majority		32,478	29.61	
Turnout		109,695	28.11	
CPI win (new seat)				

== Notes ==
Lok Sabha
Preceded by Lucknow	Constituency represented by the leader of the opposition 1996	Succeeded by Lucknow
