= Government Polytechnic, Balasore =

Engineering school of Odisha

Coordinates: 21.533280°N 86.847246°E

- Established: 2013
- Principal: Er. M.P.Panigrahi
- Location: Balasore, Orissa, India
- Campus: Bidyadharpur, Remuna, Balasore
- Affiliations: State Council for Technical Education & Vocational Training, Orissa, AICTE, DTET

The Government Polytechnic, Balasore is a State Government run diploma engineering school. It is established in 2013 by the Directorate of Technical Education & Vocational Training(DTET), Orissa. It started with all the new Government Polytechnics in Orissa at a time.

== Campus ==
The campus of the institution is located just 4 km from N.H. no 16 and 12 km from Balasore town. But the Institution situated in a good environment for education area.

1. Electrical Engineering
2. Electronics & Telecommunication Engineering
3. Mechanical Engineering
4. Civil engineering

== Admissions ==
Students can get admission to this institute by getting rank in Diploma Entrance Test organises every year by SCTE & VT. There is two categories available for admission. That are freshers entry after Matriculation(10th) & 20% seat are reserved for admission in two 2nd year or Third semester directly after ITI or +2 Science .

== Training and placement ==
The institution runs all the training curriculum as per the norms of SCTE & VT & Govt. of Odisha. As its final students are not graduated till now the placement strategies are not available still now. But the placement cell is available in the institution.
