= Bhubanananda Odisha School of Engineering, Cuttack =

Engineering school in Odisha, India

- Other names: BOSE
- Type: Public
- Established: 1923
- Academic affiliations: SCTE & VT, AICTE, DTET
- Principal: Gyanaranjan Ray
- Location: S.C.B. Medical Road, Cuttack, Cuttack, Odisha, India; 20.4771°N 85.8941°E
- Campus: Urban, 44 acres (18 ha)
- Website: www.bosecuttack.in

Bhubanananda Odisha School of Engineering (BOSE) (Odia: ଭୁବନାନନ୍ଦ ଓଡିଶା ଯାନ୍ତ୍ରିକ ବିଦ୍ୟାଳୟ, କଟକ) is the oldest diploma engineering school in Odisha. It is located in Cuttack, Odisha, India.

Founded in 1923 as Orissa School of Engineering. It initially offered civil engineering; mechanical engineering and electrical engineering were introduced later. It currently offers a three-year diploma in engineering in eight disciplines.

== History ==
The Cuttack Survey School 1876 — later renamed to Orissa School of Engineering — was established as the first technical school in the state. The conversation of School of Engineering happened in 1923. This is the oldest technical institute in the state.

Prior to 1923, there was no scope of technical education in Orissa. Students were going to Bihar School of Engineering for Diploma courses. On elevation of Bihar School of Engineering to Bihar Engineering College, Orissa School of Engineering was established in 1923 at Cuttack under Bihar-Orissa Government.

After World War II in 1939 and during Japanese aggression in 1942, Orissa School of Engineering trained more than 1000 war technicians, demobilized soldiers, and industrial trainees. The institute was centre of war efforts in the Eastern Region. Lord Wavell, the then Viceroy of India was paying hurricane visits to the institution during the thick of war. Initially technician courses in civil engineering, electrical-mechanical engineering were offered. At a later stage, to meet the industrial demand, diversified courses were introduced under the semester system in 1971.

== Courses ==
The institute currently offers three year diploma/polytechnic courses in nine disciplines:

- Civil engineering
- Electrical engineering
- Mechanical engineering
- Electronics & telecommunication engineering
- Automobile engineering
- Computer science and engineering
- Information technology
- Applied electronics and instrumentation engineering
- Automation and robotics

The institute also has a Mathematics and Science Department which provides courses for 1st year students along with advanced mathematics courses for other departments. Campus Layout: Spread over 44 acre of area near River Mahanadi which covers the main Institution, Separate Boys and Girls Hostel ad Staff Quarters. It has a lush green Play ground which is maintained by Union Sporting Club. This campus also shared by Biju Pattnaik Film and TV Institute of Orissa BPFTIO, a TV and film institute in Eastern India.
