= Ananta Tripathi Sarma =

Indian Politician, Ayurvedic Doctor, Social reformer

Member of Parliament, Lok Sabha
- In office 1967–1971
- Preceded by: Mohan Nayak
- Succeeded by: Duti Krushna Panda
- Constituency: Bhanjanagar, Odisha
- In office 1962–1967
- Succeeded by: Jagannath Rao
- Constituency: Chatrapur, Odisha

Personal details
- Born: Jagannathapur Sasan, Asika, Ganjam district, Madras Presidency, British India; 10 February 1905
- Died: 11 July 1991 (aged 86)
- Party: Indian National Congress
- Spouse: Vishnupriya Devi

Ananta Tripathi Sarma was an Indian politician, Ayurvedic doctor and Social reformer from Odisha, India. He was elected to the Lok Sabha, the lower house of the Parliament of India as a member of the Indian National Congress.
