= Jharsuguda Engineering School, Jharsuguda =

Jharsuguda Engineering School (JES), Jharsuguda
- "ଝାରସୁଗୁଡ଼ା ଯାନ୍ତ୍ରିକ ମହାବିଦ୍ୟାଳୟ, ଝାରସୁଗୁଡ଼ା"
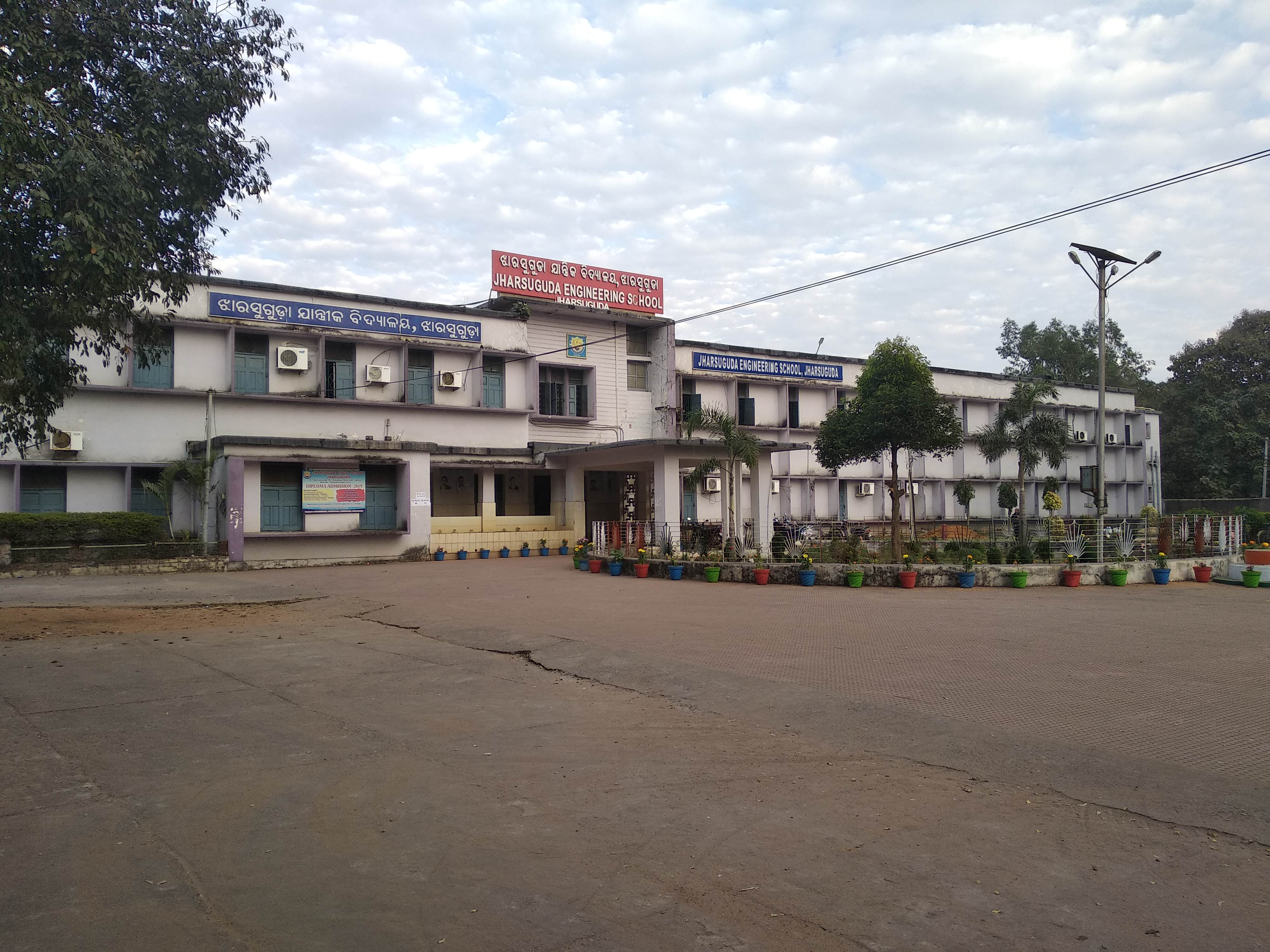

Location
- Jharsuguda, Orissa; India
- Coordinates: 21°51′44.0″N 84°02′27.8″E

Information
- Established: 1955
- School district: Jharsuguda
- Principal: Mr. Dhananjay Khura (Principal)
- Language: English, Odiya
- Campus size: 78.025 acres (31.576 ha)
- Affiliation: State Council for Technical Education & Vocational Training, Orissa, AICTE
- Website: jesjharsuguda.org.in

The Jharsuguda Engineering School(JES), Jharsuguda (Odia: ଝାରସୁଗୁଡ଼ା ଯାନ୍ତ୍ରିକ ମହାବିଦ୍ୟାଳୟ, ଝାରସୁଗୁଡ଼ା) is a public diploma engineering school established in 1955 by Government of Odisha. Currently the institution is affiliated to SCTE & VT & DTET of Orissa. It gives three year diploma courses in variety of branches of engineering. It also obeys the norms of AICTE.

== History ==
The institute was second most old institute for diploma education established in Odisha. It was established in 1955 by Directorate of Technical Education & Vocational Training, Orissa with the help from Department of Industries of Orissa. In the recent history 2006 the institute had observed its Golden Jubilee with the presence of the honourable Chief Minister of Orissa. It has also been helped by the leading industries near by it both private & public sector companies.

== Campus ==
The campus of the institution is located having both road & rail communication having a land of 78.02 acres area. It is located 2 km from the nearest town Jharsuguda bus stand & 4 km from the Jharsuguda Railway Station & N.H. No.49. The institute also have good infra-structured campus as it is one of a leading diploma institutes in Odisha. As in Jharsuguda district there are several industries established. The institution is basically surrounded by industries.

== Courses offered ==
- Civil Engineering
- Electrical Engineering
- Mechanical Engineering
- E & TC Engineering
- Information Technology

== Admission procedure ==
The students are admitted through DET(Diploma Entrance Test) conducted by SCTE&VT, Odisha. There is also provision of Lateral Entry of 10% of sanctioned intake for lateral entry rank holders(ITI & +2 Sc. holders) for admission directly to the third Semester in their respective branch of study as per the SCTE&VT guidelines.
