= Sudhira Das =

Indian engineer (1932–2015)

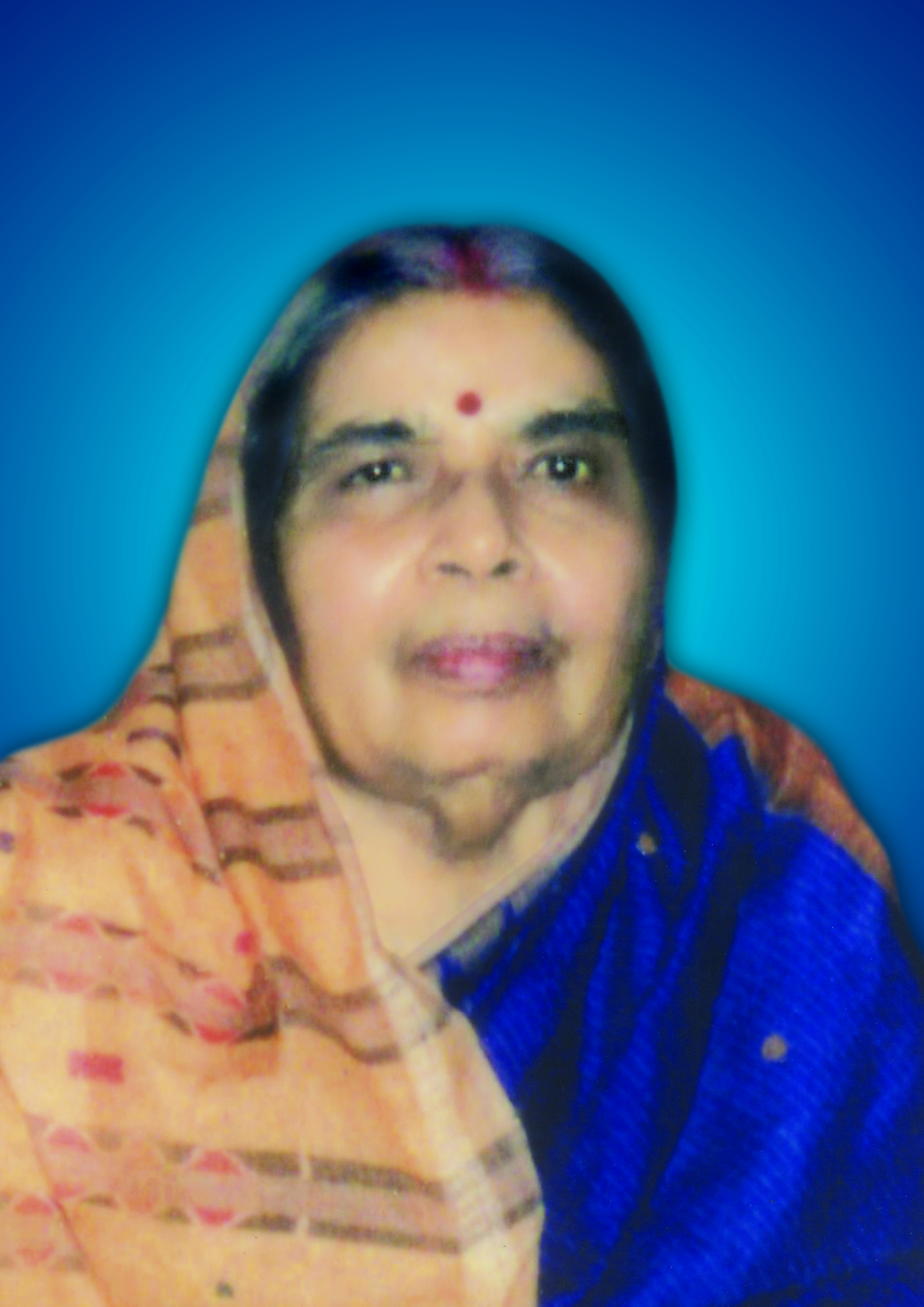
- Born: 8 March 1932; Cuttack, Odisha, British Raj
- Died: 30 October 2015 (aged 83); Bhubaneswar, Odisha, India
- Citizenship: Indian
- Education: Ravenshaw College; University of Science and Technology, Calcutta
- Engineering career
- Institutions: Berhampur Engineering School (currently Uma Charan Pattnaik Engineering School), Women's Polytechnic, Rourkela; Women's Polytechnic, Bhubaneswar
- Projects: Establishment of Women's Polytechnic, Bhubaneswar

Sudhira Das (/dɑːs/; 8 March 1932 – 30 October 2015) was an Indian engineer. She was the first female engineer from the state of Odisha. She became an engineer at a time when education was a taboo for women in India.

== Early life ==
She was born in an aristocratic Karan family in Cuttack, Odisha on 8 March 1932. She had a passion for Mathematics from her childhood.

=== Education ===
She graduated with Bachelor of Science from the Ravenshaw College in 1951, after which she joined University of Science and Technology, Calcutta in 1956 for her masters in Radio Physics and Electronics.

== Work ==
After graduating with her MSc. (Tech), Das started teaching at the Berhampur Engineering School (currently Uma Charan Pattnaik Engineering School) as a lecturer in the department of Mathematics in 1957. Later she became the principal of Women's Polytechnic, Rourkela. During 1957–1990, she served the Government of Odisha in various different capacities. During that period she founded Women's Polytechnic, Bhubaneswar, an institutions providing diploma programs to female students which has been one of her major contributions.

== Death ==
She died on 30 October 2015 at the age of 83.
