= Berhampur Assembly constituency =

Assembly constituency in Odisha

Coordinates: 19.31°N 84.79°E

Berhampur
- Constituency No. 133 for the Odisha Legislative Assembly
- Berhampur assembly constituency in Ganjam district

Constituency details
- Country: India
- Region: East India
- State: Odisha
- Division: Southern Division
- District: Ganjam
- Lok Sabha constituency: Berhampur
- Established: 1951
- Total electors: 2,24,982 (Note: as on 2024) (Note: as data published by election commission)
- Reservation: None

Member of Legislative Assembly
- 17th Odisha Legislative Assembly
- Incumbent K Anil Kumar
- Party: Bharatiya Janata Party
- Elected year: 2024

Berhampur is a Vidhan Sabha constituency of Ganjam district.

Area of this constituency includes ward no. 1 to ward no. 24 of Brahmapur Municipal Corporation.

== Elected members ==
Vote share of winning candidates
2024	43.93%
2019	57.27%
2014	37.85%
2009	46.68%
2004	42.32%
2000	50.56%
1995	42.42%
1990	64.83%
1985	51.38%
1980	66.31%
1977	47.82%

Since its formation in 1951, 18 elections were held till date including one bypoll in 1955. It was a 2-member constituency for 1952 & 1957.

List of members elected from Berhampur constituency are:

Year	Member	Party
2024	K Anil Kumar	Bharatiya Janata Party
2019	Bikram Kumar Panda	Biju Janata Dal
2014	Ramesh Chandra Chyau Patnaik	Biju Janata Dal
2009	Ramesh Chandra Chyau Patnaik	Biju Janata Dal
2004	Ramesh Chandra Chyau Patnaik	Biju Janata Dal
2000	Ramesh Chandra Chyau Patnaik	Biju Janata Dal
1995	Ramesh Chandra Chyau Patnaik	Janata Dal
1990	Binayak Mahapatra	Janata Dal
1985	Siba Sankar Sahani	Indian National Congress
1980	Krushna Chandra Patnaik	Indian National Congress (I)
1977	Ratna Manjari Devi	Independent politician
1974	Binayak Acharya	Indian National Congress
1971	Binayak Acharya	Indian National Congress (R)
1967	Binayak Acharya	Indian National Congress
1961	Sisir Kumar Narendra Deb	Indian National Congress
1957 (Note: It was a 2 member constituency)	Dandapani Das	Indian National Congress
1957	Lingaraj Panigrahi	Indian National Congress
1955 (bypoll) (Note: Resignation of both member)	Mohan Nayak (Note: Resignation of Dandapani Das)	Indian National Congress
1955 (bypoll)	Brundaban Nayak (Note: Resignation of Ramachandra Mishra)	Indian National Congress
1951 (Note: It was a 2 member constituency)	Dandapani Das	Independent politician
1951	Ramachandra Mishra	Independent politician

== Election results ==
=== 2024 ===
Voting were held on 13 May 2024 in 1st phase of Odisha Assembly Election & 4th phase of Indian General Election. Counting of votes was on 4 June 2024. In 2024 election, Bharatiya Janata Party candidate K Anil Kumar defeated Biju Janata Dal candidate Ramesh Chandra Chyau Patnaik by a margin of 18,709 votes.

2024 Vidhan Sabha Election, Berhampur
Party	Candidate	Votes	%	±%
BJP	K Anil Kumar	54,997	43.93	▲16.49
BJD	Ramesh Chandra Chyau Patnaik	36,288	28.99	▼28.28
Independent	Siva Shankar Dash	24,661	19.70	▲11.44
INC	Deepak Patnaik	5,385	4.30	▼0.22
NOTA	None of the above	638	0.51	▼0.43
Majority		18,709	14.95	▼14.88
Turnout		1,25,181	55.64	▼0.66
BJP gain from BJD				

=== 2019 ===
In 2019 election, Biju Janata Dal candidate Bikram Kumar Panda defeated Bharatiya Janata Party candidate Kanhu Charan Pati by a margin of 35,484 votes.

2019 Vidhan Sabha Election, Berhampur
Party	Candidate	Votes	%	±%
BJD	Bikram Kumar Panda	68,113	57.27	
BJP	Kanhu Charan Pati	32,629	27.44	
Independent	Siva Shankar Dash	9,821	8.26	
INC	Lingaraj Chaudhury	5,381	4.52	
NOTA	None of the above	1,113	0.94	
Majority		35,484	29.83	
Turnout		1,18,929	56.3	
BJD hold				

=== 2014 ===
In 2014 election, Biju Janata Dal candidate Ramesh Chandra Chyau Patnaik defeated Indian National Congress candidate Bikram Kumar Panda by a margin of 1,039 votes.

2014 Vidhan Sabha Election, Berhampur
Party	Candidate	Votes	%	±%
BJD	Ramesh Chandra Chyau Patnaik	43,211	37.85	▼8.83
INC	Bikram Kumar Panda	42,172	36.94	▲5.07
BJP	Siva Shankar Dash	24,092	21.1	▲13.18
NOTA	None of the above	1,029	0.9	−
Majority		1,039	0.91	▼3.76
Turnout		1,14,155	63.99	▲15.82
Registered electors		1,78,405		
BJD hold				

=== 2009 ===
In 2009 election, Biju Janata Dal candidate Ramesh Chandra Chyau Patnaik defeated Indian National Congress candidate Bikram Kumar Panda by a margin of 3,844 votes.

2009 Vidhan Sabha Election, Berhampur
Party	Candidate	Votes	%	±%
BJD	Ramesh Chandra Chyau Patnaik	38,407	46.68	−
INC	Bikram Kumar Panda	34,563	42.01	−
BJP	Ram Chandra Panda	6,515	7.92	−
Majority		3,844	4.67 (Note: %of total valid votes)	−
Turnout		82,293	48.17	−
BJD hold				
