= Utkalmani Gopabandhu Institute of Engineering =

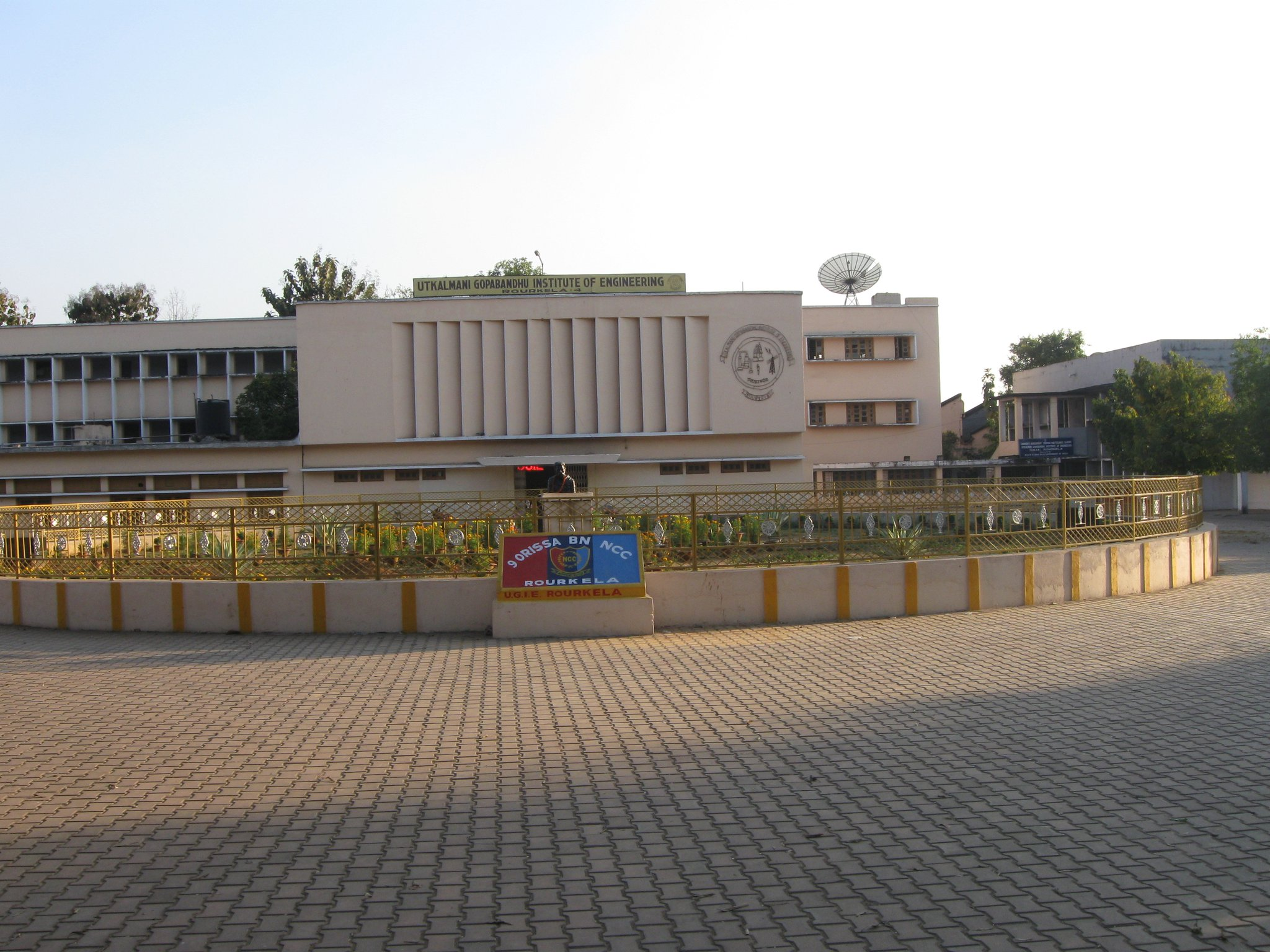
- Former names: Composite Polytechnic (1962); Rourkela Polytechnic (1966); State Technological Institute (1968)
- Type: State Governmental Diploma Education & Research Institution
- Established: 1962
- Affiliations: AICTE, DTET, SCTEVT
- Principal: Pragati Das
- Academic staff: 58
- Students: 1500
- Location: Rourkela, Odisha, India; 22.233036°N 84.827843°E
- Campus: Urban, Chhend Colony, Jail Road, Rourkela
- Website: ugierkl.ac.in

Utkalmani Gopabandhu Institute of Engineering (UGIE) is a State Governmental Diploma Engineering Institution in the western Zone of Odisha, India which was established in 1962 under the Directorate of Technical Education and Training, Odisha also known as DTET.

The Institute is affiliated with the All India Council of Technical Education, New Delhi and State Council for Technical Education & Vocational Training recognized under the state government of Odisha.

m Bhubaneswar by road.

== Courses offered ==
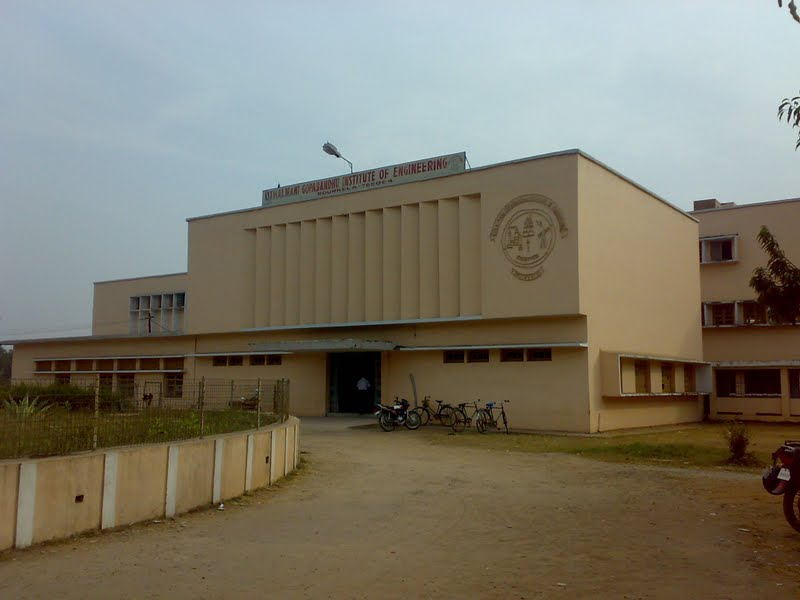
Utkalmani Gopabandhu Institute of Engineering Campus

The Institute offers a 3-year Diploma in Engineering in the branches as below.

- Mechanical Engineering
- Civil Engineering
- Chemical Engineering
- Ceramic Technology
- Electrical Engineering
- Metallurgical Engineering
- Electronics & Telecommunication Engineering

== Annual intake ==
Course The college offers a three-year Diploma in the branch of	Annual Intake
Metallurgical Engineering	120
Mechanical Engineering	120
Electronics & Telecommunication Engineering	60
Electrical Engineering	60
Ceramic Technology	45
Chemical Engineering	60
Civil Engineering	60

== Gallery ==
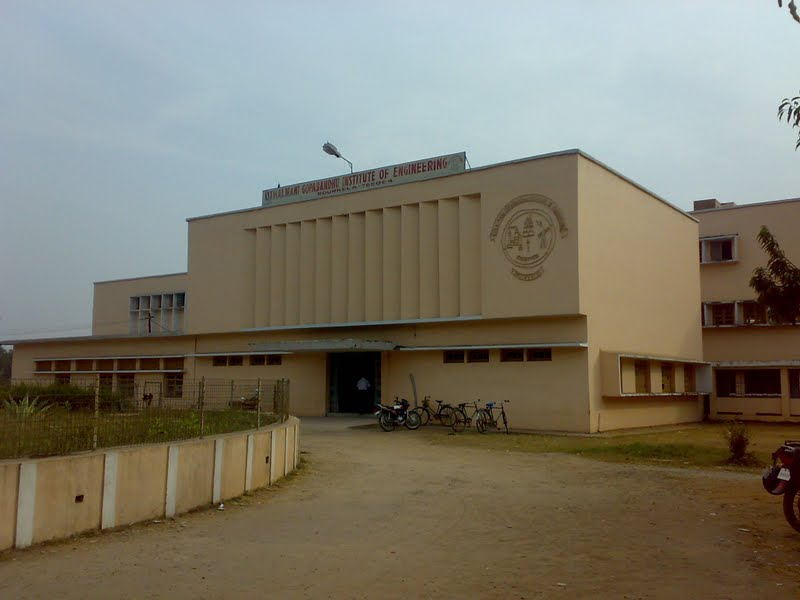
UGIE Rourkela

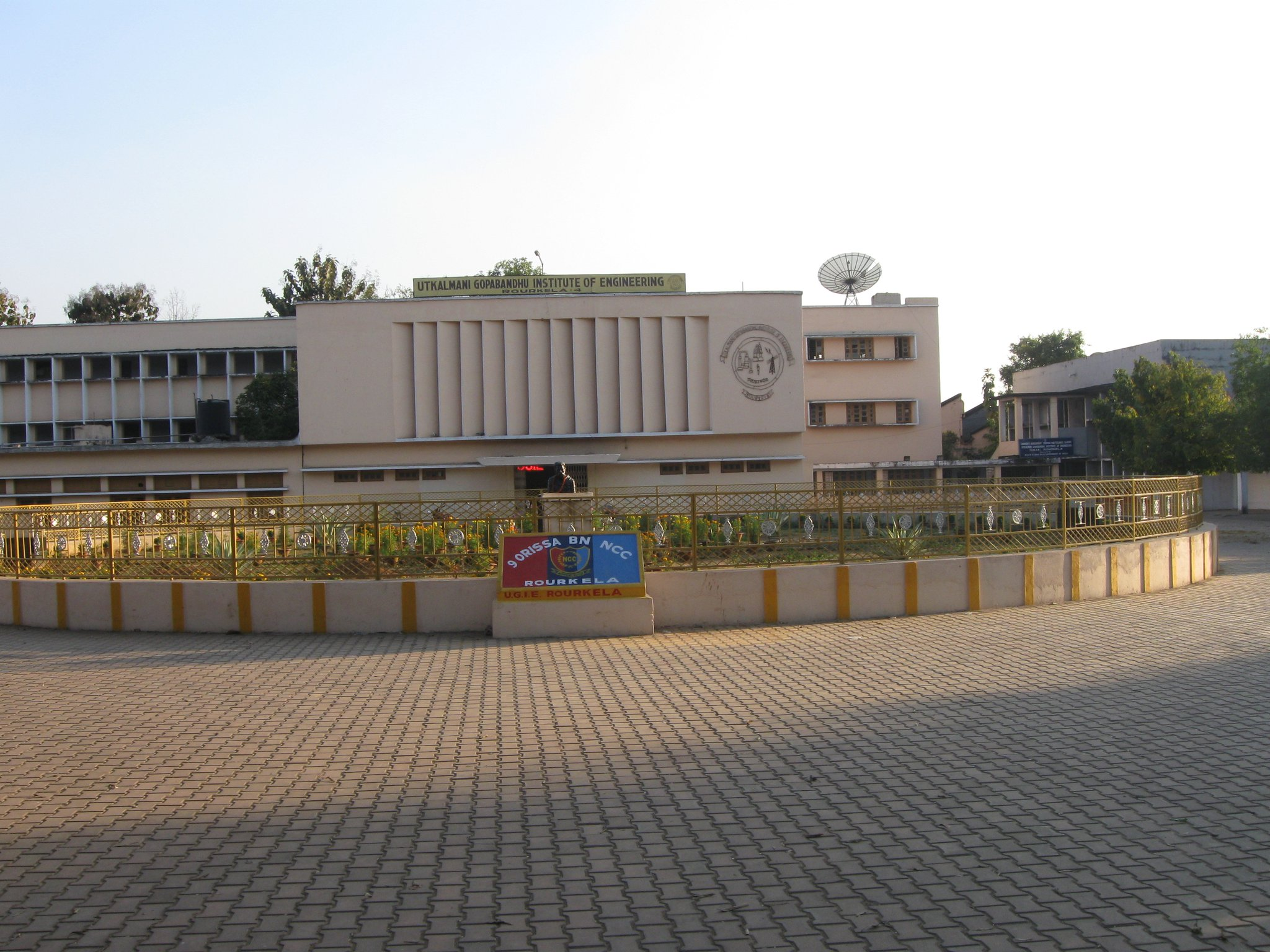
Main Campus
