= Gopalpur, Odisha Assembly constituency =

Assembly constituency in Odisha

Coordinates: 19.26°N 84.87°E

Gopalpur
- Constituency No. 132 for the Odisha Legislative Assembly
- Gopalpur Assembly constituency in Ganjam district

Constituency details
- Country: India
- Region: East India
- State: Odisha
- Division: Southern Division
- District: Ganjam
- Lok Sabha constituency: Berhampur
- Established: 1974
- Total electors: 2,27,313 (Note: as on 2024) (Note: as data published by election commission)
- Reservation: None

Member of Legislative Assembly
- 17th Odisha Legislative Assembly
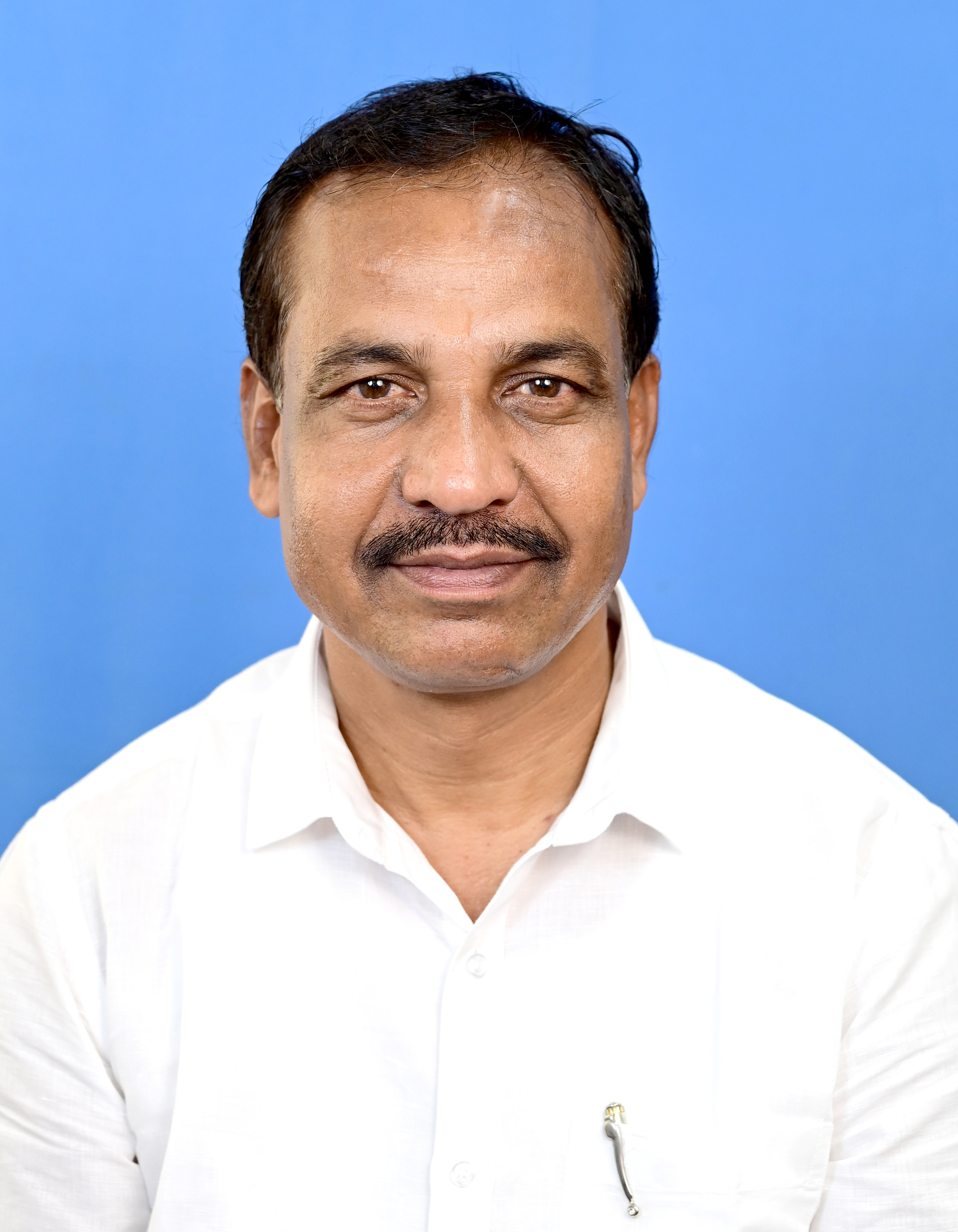
- Incumbent Bibhuti Bhusan Jena
- Party: Bharatiya Janata Party
- Elected year: 2024

Gopalpur is a Vidhan Sabha constituency of Ganjam district, Odisha.

This constituency includes Gopalpur, Ward Nos. 25 to 27 of Brahmapur, Rangailunda block and 4 Gram panchayats (Hugulapatta, Gurunthi, Barigan and Nimakhandi) of Kukudakhandi block.

== Elected members ==
Vote share of winning candidates
2024	50.11%
2019	45.69%
2014	46.98%
2009	42.77%
2004	53.55%
2000	50.13%
1995	48.38%
1990	62.83%
1985	67.67%
1980	74.53%
1977	46.44%

Since its formation in 1974, 12 elections have been held till date.

List of members elected from Gopalpur constituency are:

Year	Member	Party
2024	Bibhuti Bhusan Jena	Bharatiya Janata Party
2019 (Note: Expelled from party)	Pradeep Kumar Panigrahy	Biju Janata Dal
2014	Pradeep Kumar Panigrahy	Biju Janata Dal
2009	Pradeep Kumar Panigrahy	Biju Janata Dal
2004	Trinath Behera	Indian National Congress
2000	Ramachandra Sethi	Biju Janata Dal
1995	Ramachandra Sethi	Janata Dal
1990	Ramachandra Sethi	Janata Dal
1985	Ghanasyam Behera	Indian National Congress
1980	Ghanasyam Behera	Indian National Congress (I)
1977	Ghanasyam Behera	Indian National Congress
1974	Mohan Nayak	Indian National Congress

== Election results ==
=== 2024 ===
Voting were held on 13 May 2024 in 1st phase of Odisha Assembly Election & 4th phase of Indian General Election. Counting of votes was on 4 June 2024. In 2024 election, Bharatiya Janata Party candidate Bibhuti Bhusan Jena defeated Biju Janata Dal candidate Bikram Kumar Panda by a margin of 9,062 votes.

2024 Vidhan Sabha Election, Gopalpur
Party	Candidate	Votes	%	±%
BJP	Bibhuti Bhusan Jena	72,071	50.11	▲6.4
BJD	Bikram Kumar Panda	63,009	43.81	▼1.88
INC	Shayam Sundar Sahu	3,361	2.34	▼5.11
NOTA	None of the above	1,200	0.83	▼0.13
Majority		9,062	6.3	−
Turnout		1,43,839	63.28	▲0.37
BJP gain from BJD				

=== 2019 ===
In the 2019 election, Biju Janata Dal candidate Pradeep Kumar Panigrahy defeated Bharatiya Janata Party candidate Bibhuti Bhusan Jena by a margin of 2673 votes.

2019 Vidhan Sabha Election, Gopalpur
Party	Candidate	Votes	%	±%
BJD	Pradeep Kumar Panigrahy	61,628	45.69	▼1.29
BJP	Bibhuti Bhusan Jena	58,955	43.71	▲13.83
INC	S. Dharmaraj Reddy	10053	7.45	▼11.03
NOTA	None of the above	1,293	0.96	▼0.18
Majority		2,673	1.98	−
Turnout		1,34,888	62.91	▼4.35
BJD hold				

=== 2014 ===
In the 2014 election, Biju Janata Dal candidate Pradeep Kumar Panigrahy defeated Bharatiya Janata Party candidate Bibhuti Bhusan Jena by a margin of 20,112 votes.

2014 Vidhan Sabha Election, Gopalpur
Party	Candidate	Votes	%	±%
BJD	Pradeep Kumar Panigrahy	55,265	46.98	▲4.21
BJP	Bibhuti Bhusan Jena	35,153	29.88	▲14.97
INC	Bhagaban Gantayat	21,741	18.48	▼2.96
NOTA	None of the above	1,337	1.14	−
Majority		20,112	17.09	▼4.24
Turnout		1,17,643	67.26	▲11.71
Registered electors		174,905		
BJD hold				

=== 2009 ===
In 2009 election, Biju Janata Dal candidate Pradeep Kumar Panigrahy defeated Indian National Congress candidate Trinath Behera by a margin of 18,758 votes.

2009 Vidhan Sabha Election, Gopalpur
Party	Candidate	Votes	%	±%
BJD	Pradeep Kumar Panigrahy	37,612	42.77	−
INC	Trinath Behera	18,854	21.44	−
Independent	Anuja Kumar Nayak	14,679	16.69	−
BJP	Bibhuti Bhusan Jena	13,112	14.91	−
Majority		18,758	21.33 (Note: %of total valid votes)	−
Turnout		88,010	55.55 (Note: 2004 Voter turnout was 59.29%)	▼3.74
BJD gain from INC				
