= OSME =

OSME May Refer To.

- Ornithological Society of the Middle East
- Orissa School of Mining Engineering, Keonjhar
