= Institute of Textile Technology, Choudwar =

Coordinates: 20.527475°N 85.919277°E

Institute of Textile Technology, Choudwar, Cuttack
- Established: 1983
- Principal: Sri A.K.Mohapatra (I/C)
- Location: Choudwar, Cuttack
- Affiliations: SCTE & VT, AICTE
- Website: ittorissa.org

The Institute of Textile Technology, Choudwar, Cuttack is the only institute in Orissa offering engineering course in Textile Technology. It is a Government run diploma engineering or polytechnic established in 1983 for developing the textile manpower of Orissa for the satisfying the huge demand of manpower in textile industries and for increasing textile technical knowledge of new youth for those growing industries.

== History ==
Institute of Textile Technology was established in the year of 1983 with offering only the three year diploma engineering in Textile Technology by the department of Industries, Govt. of Orissa. At present it is under Skill Development and Technical Education(SD&TE) department. Firstly it was started for improving the man power ability of the students and peoples of Odisha working in Textile Industries. Then again in 2007 it added Electronics & Telecommunication and Mechanical Engineering to its curriculum. Subsequently, in 2009 Mechatronics is added to its curriculum. Now it is one of the leading and Govt. operated institution of Orissa.

== Facilities ==
It has facilities like Library, Hostel and Canteen facilities etc.

== Courses offered ==
- Textile Technology
- Electrical Engineering
- Mechanical Engineering
- Mechatronics
- Civil Engineering
- Electronics & Telecommunication

== Admission procedure ==
Students can get admission to ITT through Diploma Entrance Test(DET) conducted by SCTE & VT every year. Students can get admission in two categories as freshers which is after matriculation and lateral entry after ITI or +2 science. Students have to go through e-counselling process done by DET authority.

== Training and placement ==
In ITT, Choudwar there is also a training centre of Department of Industries as in every government polytechnics in Odisha and placement is currently done through Central Placement Cell, Orissa.
