= Bibhuti Bhusan Jena =

Indian politician

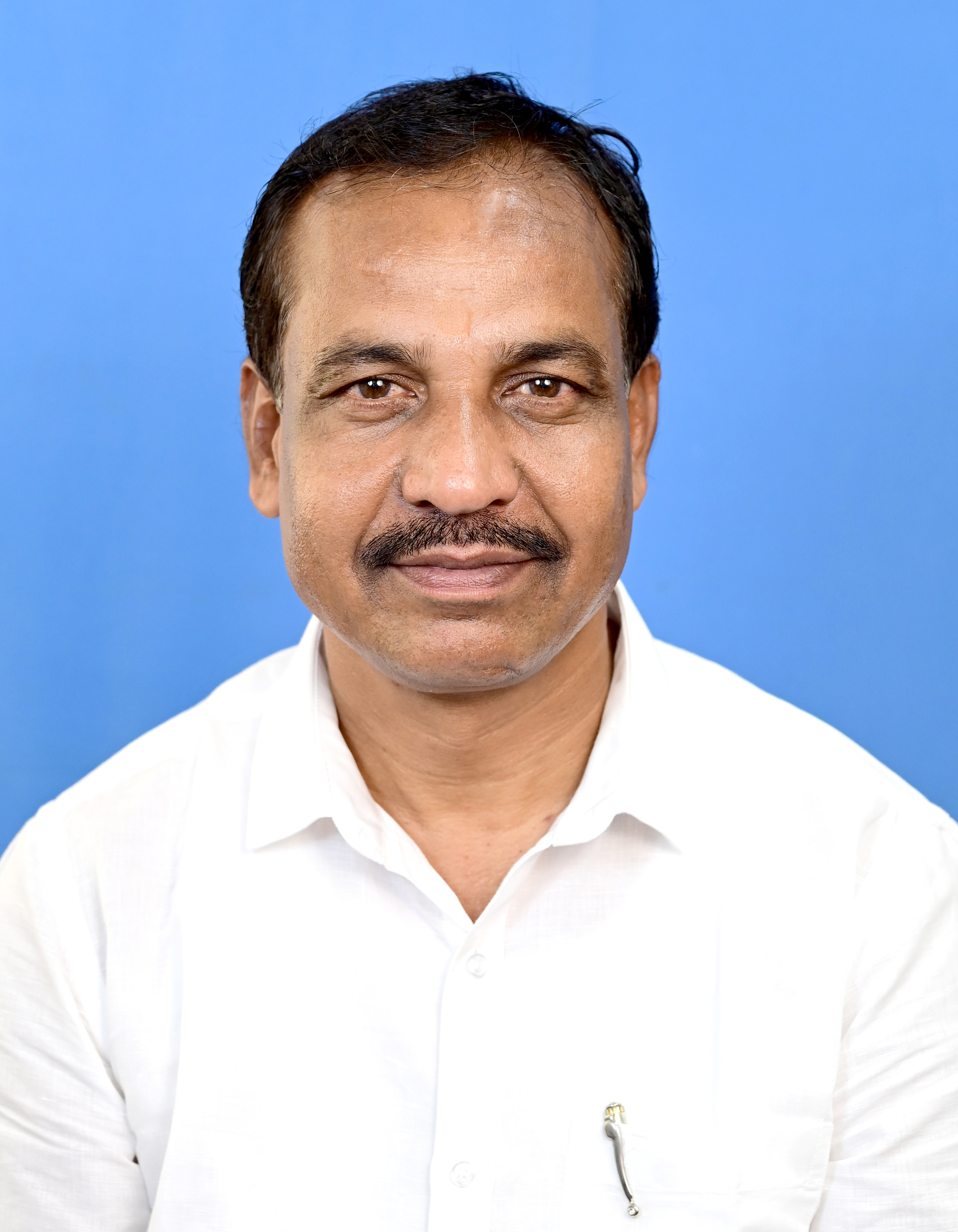
- Jena in 2024

Minister of Commerce, Transport, Steel & Mine, Government of Odisha
- Incumbent
- Assumed office 12 June 2024
- Chief Minister: Mohan Charan Majhi

Member of Odisha Legislative Assembly
- In office 4 June 2024 – Incumbent
- Preceded by: Pradeep Kumar Panigrahy
- Constituency: Gopalpur

Personal details
- Party: Bharatiya Janata Party
- Parent: Nityananda Jena
- Profession: Politician, Farmer

Bibhuti Bhusan Jena is an Indian politician and Minister of Commerce, Transport, Steel & Mine in Government of Odisha. He is a member of the Member of Odisha Legislative Assembly from Gopalpur assembly constituency of Ganjam district.

He did his Bachelor of Science (BSc) from Ganjam College, Ganjam under Berhampur Universityin the year of 1993.

On 12 June 2024, he took oath along with Chief Minister Mohan Charan Majhitook oath in Janata Maidan, Bhubaneswar. Governor Raghubar Das administered their oath. Prime Minister Narendra Modi, Home Minister Amit Shah, Defense Minister Rajnath Singh, along with Chief Ministers of 10 BJP-ruled states were present.
