= Jayanti Patnaik =

Indian parliamentarian and social worker (1933–2022)

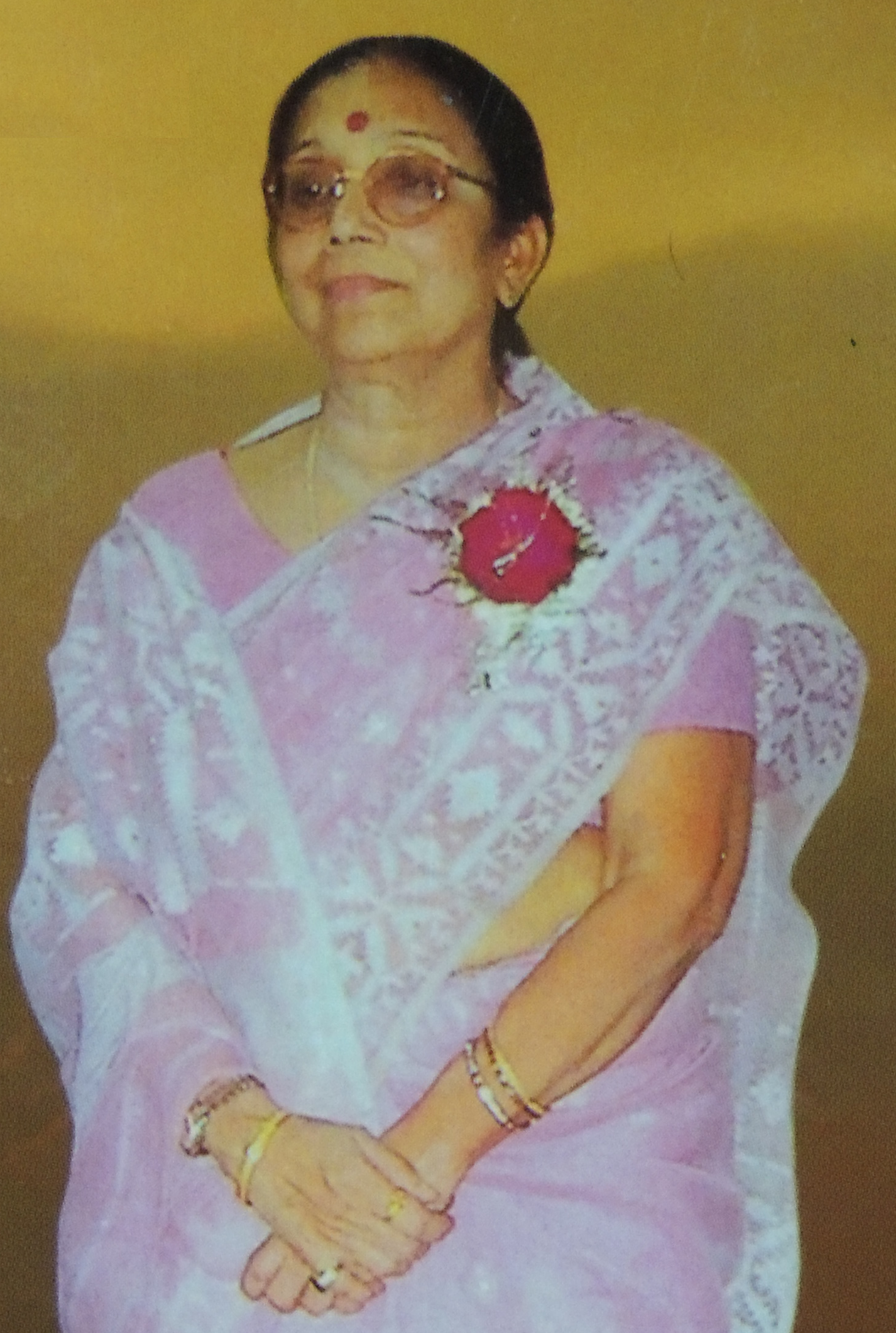

Member of Parliament
- In office 1980–1989; 1998–1999
- Preceded by: Janaki Ballabh Patnaik
- Succeeded by: Srikant Jena
- Constituency: Cuttack and Berhampur

Member of Parliament
- Preceded by: P. V. Narasimha Rao
- Succeeded by: Anadi Charan Sahu

Personal details
- Born: 7 April 1932 Aska, Orissa, British India
- Died: 28 September 2022 (aged 90) Bhubaneswar, Odisha, India
- Party: Indian National Congress
- Spouse: Janaki Ballabh Patnaik

Jayanti Patnaik (7 April 1932 – 28 September 2022) was an Indian politician and social worker. She was the first Chairperson of the National Commission for Women. Her term of office was from 3 February 1992 to 30 January 1995.

== Early life and education ==
She was born in 1932 in Aska, Ganjam district of Orissa. Her father is Niranjan Patnaik. She was educated at Harihar High School, Aska. She has studied Master of Arts (M.A.) in Social Work from Sailabala Women's College under Utkal University, Cuttack. She pursued advanced studies at Tata Institute of Social Sciences, Mumbai.

She married politician Janaki Ballabh Patnaik in 1953, who later became Chief Minister of Odisha, and the couple had one son and two daughters.
