= Uma Charan Patnaik =

Indian politician

Member of Parliament, Lok Sabha
- In office 1952–1961
- Constituency: Ganjam, Odisha

Personal details
- Born: 19 October 1902 Badagada, Ganjam District, Madras Presidency, British India
- Died: 10 February 1961 (aged 58)
- Party: Independent
- Spouse: Durgabati Debi
- Children: 2 sons, 1 daughter
- Education: A.E.L. Mission High School, Peddapuram; Khallikote College, Berhampur; Presidency College, Madras; Ravenshaw College, Cuttack
- Known for: Founder of Uma Charan Pattnaik Engineering School

Uma Charan Patnaik was born on 19 October 1902 in Badagada, Ganjam district to Abhimanyu Pattnaik and Sriya Debi. His father was a District collector in Madras presidency. Educated in A.E.L. Mission High School, Peddapuram and other High Schools in Ganjam, Visakhapatnam and Godavari districts. Umacharan completed his intermediate in Khallikote College, Berhampur and graduated from Presidency College, Madras. Then he completed his M.A. and B.L. from Ravenshaw College, Cuttack.

As a follower of the Gandhian path he from 1922, devoted himself to the services of the Harijans in Ganjam. He was able to create consciousness among the Hadi, Bauri, and Dandashi subcastes in the Harijan community. He started his law business first in Aska in 1927 and later shifted to Berhampur in 1929. He was a successful lawyer who took his law business seriously though he also took interest in the Civil disobedience movement in 1930 along with Niranjan Pattnaik. When Gandhi visited Ganjam in 1928 he was accompanied by both Niranjan and Umacharan to various places in Ganjam where his speeches in Hindi were translated by both of them. Since Gandhi's visit to Ganjam, Umacharan made it a habit to wear Khadi covering his knee only and a gamchha hanging on his shoulder. He remained in this attire till his death. He also became a regular donor to the Swaraj fund. He also regularly purchased khadi clothes from Swaraja Ashrama in Berhampur which was looked after by Niranjana Pattnaik.

On the instruction of Mahatma Gandhi, he also joined the movement against intoxication. He along with other leaders like Niranjana Pattnaik, V.V. Giri, and Pamtulu Ramalingam regularly picketed liquor vendors. During the Civil Disobedience Movement in Chhatrapur when a liquor shop was decided to be auctioned, they staged a 'dharna' before the shop for which they were arrested and convicted. During this time he regularly contributed articles to Shasibhusan Rath's Asha, Niranjan Pattnaik's Gandhi Samachar in Odia, and Sashibhusan's 'New Orissa' and 'East Coast' in English on various issues of the national movement. In 1939, in a by-election in G Udayagiri he defeated the powerful and influential king of Kanika and was elected to the state assembly.

He was the District president of Congress in 1935 and chairman of the District Board in 1936. In 1936, after the creation of a separate province of Odisha, Umacharan became the first 'Public Prosecutor of the Ganjam district and Commissioner of ' Boys Scouts'. But he came under the scan of the government for his association with I.N.A. as it was revealed that 80% of the respondents were a case of I.N.A. personnel or British oppression for which he stood for their justice in the court of law. This created an embarrassing situation for the government for which he had to resign from the post. But his patriotism and non-compromising attitude against British injustice is praiseworthy.

In 1941, he was arrested for staging individual Satyagraha and was sentenced to six months imprisonment and lodged in Rasselkonda and Berhampur jail. In 1942, when Niranjan Pattnaik was arrested on charges of blowing up the Rushikulya bridge in Aska, Umacharan successfully defended him a result of which Niranjan was acquitted. But soon he himself was arrested for participating in the Quit India movement and was detained in Berhampur jail till 17 June 1945. In 1946, he was elected to the provincial assembly from Berhampur.

Uma Charan Patnaik Engineering School, Berhampur previously known as Berhampur Engineering School named after the Great Freedom Fighter and Eminent Parliamentarian Late Uma Charan Pattnaik was established in the year 1956. It is located in the Silk City at a distance of 3 km from the railway station and 3 km from the bus stand. It is located 10 km from Gopalpur on Sea.

After independence, following differences with Congress, he contested as an independent candidate from the Lok Sabha seat of Berhampur in the 1952 general election and won. In 1956 as a member of the Parliamentary Committee constituted under the chairmanship of M.A. Ayyangar went to China to study their defence system. After his return he in his report submitted, he said the government to the attitude of China which was overlooked by the then Minister of Defence Sri V.K. Menon. He was proven right after the Chinese invasion in 1962. But he did not live to prove himself right as he died on 10 February 1961 at the age of 59.
