= Chhatrapur Assembly constituency =

Constituency of the Odisha legislative assembly in India

Coordinates: 19.36°N 84.99°E

Chhatrapur
- Constituency No. 127 for the Odisha Legislative Assembly
- Chhatrapur Assembly constituency in Ganjam district

Constituency details
- Country: India
- Region: East India
- State: Odisha
- Division: Southern Division
- District: Ganjam
- Lok Sabha constituency: Berhampur
- Established: 1951
- Total electors: 2,36,803 (Note: as on 2024) (Note: as data published by election commission)
- Reservation: SC

Member of Legislative Assembly
- 17th Odisha Legislative Assembly
- Incumbent Krushna Chandra Nayak
- Party: Bharatiya Janata Party
- Elected year: 2024

Chhatrapur is a Vidhan Sabha constituency of Ganjam district, Odisha.

This constituency includes Chhatrapur, Ganjam, Rambha, Chhatrapur block and Ganjam block.

== Elected members ==
Vote share of winning candidates
2024	48%
2019	50.19%
2014	38.33%
2009	44.26%
2004	52.56%
2000	42.59%
1995	40.80%
1990	62.56%
1985	47.76%
1980	47.43%
1977	46.93%

Since its formation in 1951, 17 elections were held till date.

List of members elected from Chhatrapur constituency are:

Year	Member	Party
2024	Krushna Chandra Nayak	Bharatiya Janata Party
2019	Subash Chandra Behera	Biju Janata Dal
2014	Priyanshu Pradhan	Biju Janata Dal
2009	Adikanda Sethi	Communist Party of India
2004	Nagireddi Narayan Reddy	Communist Party of India
2000	Rama Chandra Panda	Bharatiya Janata Party
1995	Daitari Behera	Indian National Congress
1990	Parsuram Panda	Communist Party of India
1985	Ashok Kumar Choudhury	Indian National Congress
1980	Biswanath Sahu	Communist Party of India
1977	Biswanath Sahu	Communist Party of India
1974	Daitari Behera	Utkal Congress
1971	Lakshman Mahapatra	Communist Party of India
1967	Lakshman Mahapatra	Communist Party of India
1961	Lakshman Mahapatra	Communist Party of India
1957	Yatiraj Praharaj	Indian National Congress
1951	Sitaramaya V.	Independent politician

== Election results ==
=== 2024 ===
Voting were held on 13 May 2024 in 1st phase of Odisha Assembly Election & 4th phase of Indian General Election. Counting of votes was on 4 June 2024. In 2024 election, Bharatiya Janata Party candidate Krushna Chandra Nayak defeated Biju Janata Dal candidate Subash Chandra Behera by a margin of 11,438 votes.

2024 Vidhan Sabha Election, Chhatrapur
Party	Candidate	Votes	%	±%
BJP	Krushna Chandra Nayak	74,983	48.00	▲7.32
BJD	Subash Chandra Behera	63,545	40.68	▼9.51
INC	Bhagirathi Behera	7,186	4.60	▼10.63
CPI	Guru Nath Pradhan	3,963	2.54	▼6.05
NOTA	None of the above	1,958	1.25	
Majority		11,438	7.32	
Turnout		1,56,217	65.97	
BJP gain from BJD				

=== 2019 ===
In 2019 election, Biju Janata Dal candidate Subash Chandra Behera defeated Bharatiya Janata Party candidate Prasanta Kumar Kar by a margin of 21,051 votes.

2019 Vidhan Sabha Election, Chhatrapur
Party	Candidate	Votes	%	±%
BJD	Subash Chandra Behera	74,594	50.19	
BJP	Prasanta Kumar Kar	53,543	36.02	
CPI	Pradeep Kumar Sethy	12,766	8.59	
NOTA	None of the above	1,776	1.19	
Majority		21,051	14.17	
Turnout		1,48,633	65.79	
BJD hold				

=== 2014 ===
In 2014 election, Biju Janata Dal candidate Priyanshu Pradhan defeated Communist Party of India candidate Krushna Chandra Nayak by a margin of 22,019 votes.

2014 Vidhan Sabha Election, Chhatrapur
Party	Candidate	Votes	%	±%
BJD	Priyanshu Pradhan	53,221	38.33	−
CPI	Krushna Chandra Nayak	31,202	22.47	▼21.79
BJP	Dharanidhar Behera	27,511	19.81	▼8.61
INC	Banamali Sethi	21,151	15.23	▼5.97
NOTA	None of the above	2,211	1.59	−
Majority		22,019	15.86	▲0.01
Turnout		1,38,855	68.08	▲12.85
Registered electors		2,03,966		
BJD gain from CPI				

=== 2009 ===
In 2009 election, Communist Party of India candidate Adikanda Sethi defeated Bharatiya Janata Party candidate Bhagaban Behera by a margin of 16,557 votes.

2009 Vidhan Sabha Election, Chhatrapur
Party	Candidate	Votes	%	±%
CPI	Adikanda Sethi	46,244	44.26	−
BJP	Bhagaban Behera	29,687	28.42	−
INC	Somanath Behera	22,146	21.20	−
Majority		16,557	15.85 (Note: %of total valid votes)	−
Turnout		1,04,507	55.23 (Note: 2004 Voter turnout was 59.44%)	▼4.21
CPI hold				
