= Orissa School of Mining Engineering, Keonjhar =

College in Orissa, India

Odisha School Of Mining Engineering, Keonjhar
- Motto: Wisdom Courage & Confidence
- Established: 1956
- Accreditation: AICTE
- Academic affiliations: State Council for Technical Education & Vocational Training
- Principal: Er. Jnanaranjan Das
- Location: Keonjhar, Orissa, India
- Campus: Mining Road, Keonjhar, Odisha
- Website: www.osme.net.in

The Orissa (Odisha) School of Engineering (OSME, Keonjhar) is a state government run higher education institute started in 1956 for focusing on the education and research of mining engineering. Subsequently, the institute introduced engineering diploma in electrical engineering, mechanical engineering, drilling engineering and metallurgical engineering. Also it introduced a degree engineering course in 1995. But in 2012, the program was separated and renamed as Government College of Engineering, Keonjhar.

== History ==
Orissa (Odisha) School of Mining Engineering (OSME), Keonjhar was initially started under Department of Industries, Government of Odisha in 1956 offering diploma education in mining engineering. That time it was the only college of Eastern Region (India) offering mining engineering. Then in 1986 to 1988, the institute introduced mechanical, electrical and drilling engineering to its curriculum. Subsequently, in 1992, metallurgical engineering was added with an endowment from World Bank Assisted Project. A new curriculum added as the Degree Stream of Engineering in 1995 with named Orissa School of Mining Engineering (Degree Stream), Keonjhar. With the help from SCTE&VT in 2010, the institution diversified by adding civil engineering.

== Campus ==
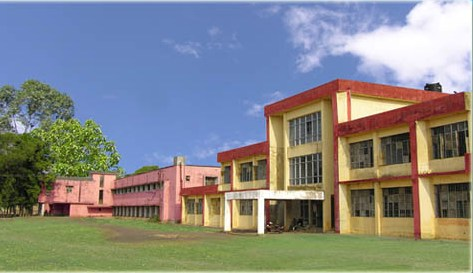
OSME Main Building

The campus of the institution is placed in Keonjhar town with 44 acres (18 ha) of land surrounded by green hills. It is 1 km (0.62 mi) away from N.H. 215 and 3 km (1.9 mi) from N.H. no.6. The nearest railway station is Keonjhargarh railway station (6 km [3.7 mi]) and the nearest airport is in Bhubaneswar. It is located centrally from all important cities of Odisha.

== Courses offered ==
- Civil Engineering
- Drilling Engineering
- Electrical Engineering
- Mechanical Engineering
- Metallurgical Engineering
- Mining Engineering

== Admission procedure ==
The students are admitted through DET (Diploma Entrance Test) conducted by SCTE&VT, Odisha. There is also provision of lateral entry of 20% of sanctioned intake for lateral entry rank holders (ITI & +2 Sc. holders) for admission directly to the third Semester in their respective branch of study as per the SCTE&VT guidelines.

== Training and placement ==
The Vocational Training is organised for each semester of Mining & Drilling Engineering students in various core industries. OSME assures students for campus placement at Industries in India & abroad. The industries are like OSIL, Keonjhar, TATA STEEL, JSL, JSW, JSPL, L&T, IMFA, ESSEL MINING, VETCO, SINGAPORE & MESCO LTD. etc.
