= Anadi Charan Sahu =

Indian politician (1940–2024)

Member of Parliament, Lok Sabha
- In office 1977–1980
- Preceded by: Jayanti Patnaik
- Succeeded by: Chandra Sekhar Sahu
- Constituency: Berhampur

Personal details
- Born: 16 April 1940 Khairapanka, Ganjam District, Orissa Province, British India
- Died: 20 January 2024 (aged 83) Cuttack, Odisha, India
- Party: Bharatiya Janata Party
- Spouse: Late Urmimala Sahu
- Children: Three daughters
- Education: B.A., Diploma in Criminology
- Alma mater: Utkal University; National Institute of Criminology and Forensic Science
- Profession: Civil Servant/Parliamentarian

Anadi Charan Sahu (16 April 1940 – 20 January 2024) was an Indian politician from Bharatiya Janata Party. He was a member of 6th Lok Sabha from Berhampur constituency in the 1999 Indian General Election. He was an I.P.S. Officer and was also a Recipient of the President's Police Medal and the Distinguished Service Medal.

Late Urmimala Sahu was his spouse. They were residents of CDA Sector-6, a neighbourhood in Cuttack. Anadi Charan Sahu died at his home in Cuttack, Odisha, on 20 January 2024, at the age of 83.
