= Chandra Sekhar Sahu =

Politician from Odisha, India

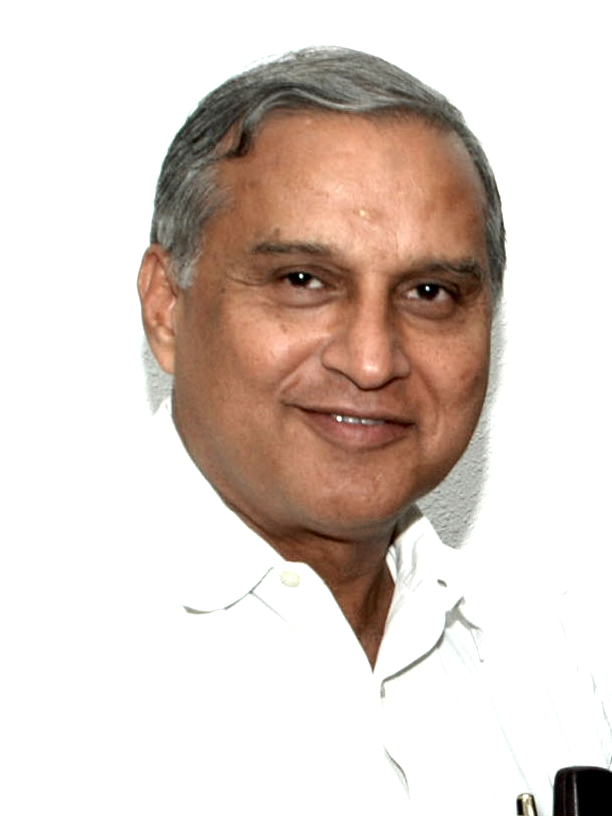

Member of Parliament, Lok Sabha
- In office 23 May 2019 – 4 June 2024
- Preceded by: Sidhant Mohapatra
- Succeeded by: Pradeep Kumar Panigrahy
- Constituency: Berhampur

Member of parliament
- In office 13 May 2004 – 16 May 2009
- Preceded by: Anadi Charana Sahu
- Succeeded by: Sidhant Mohapatra
- Constituency: Berhampur

Personal details
- Born: 7 July 1950 (age 75) Ganjam, Odisha
- Party: BJD
- Spouse: Leela Sahu
- Children: 3 Daughters
- As of 22 September, 2006

Chandra Sekhar Sahu (born 7 July 1950) is a member of the 14th Lok Sabha of India. He represented the Brahmapur constituency of Odisha and was a member of the Congress and now is in Biju Janata Dal.

He was Minister of State in the Ministry of Rural Development

In the 15th Lok Sabha Election of India he was from Congress and lost to Odia mega star Sidhant Mohapatra. Then he joined B.J.D. and got the ticket for the 17th Lok Sabha elections, in which he won.
