= K Anil Kumar =

Indian politician

Member of the Odisha Legislative Assembly
- Incumbent
- Assumed office 4 June 2024
- Preceded by: Bikram Kumar Panda
- Constituency: Berhampur

Personal details
- Political party: Bharatiya Janata Party
- Profession: Politician

K Anil Kumar is an Indian politician from Odisha. He is a Member of the Odisha Legislative Assembly from 2024, representing Berhampur Assembly constituency as a Member of the Bharatiya Janata Party.

== See also ==
- 2024 Odisha Legislative Assembly election
- Odisha Legislative Assembly
