= Uma Charan Patnaik Engineering School =

Uma Charan Patnaik Engineering School (UCPES)
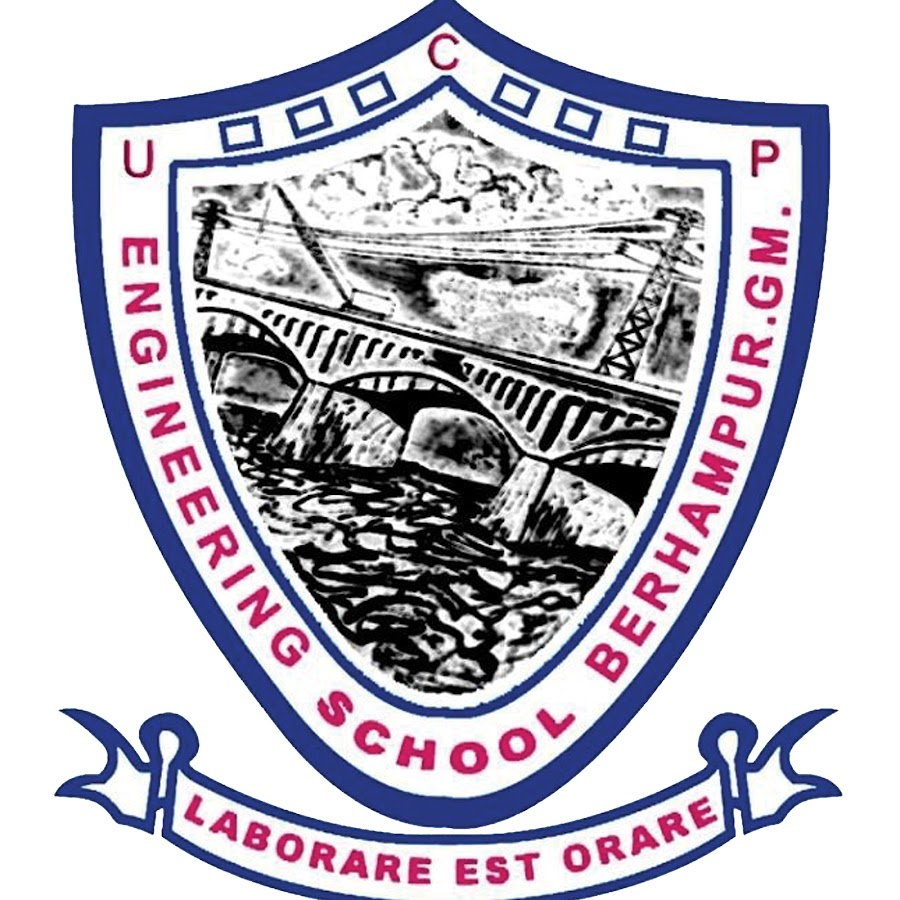
- This image is the emblem or logo of Uma Charan Pattnaik Engineering School (UCPES), Berhampur, Ganjam. The emblem includes the Latin phrase "Laborare est orare," meaning "To work is to pray," reflecting the institution's values of hard work and dedication as a form of devotion. The emblem also features an illustration of a bridge, symbolizing engineering and the technical field.
- Other name: UCPES
- Motto: laborare est orare
- Motto in English: "Laborare est orare" is Latin, and it translates to "To work is to pray." This phrase reflects the idea that diligent work can be a form of devotion or worship, often associated with monastic values.
- Notable for: Diploma courses in Engineering fields
- Type: Vocational education
- Established: 1956
- Founder: Uma Charan Patnaik
- Accreditation: Uma Charan Pattnaik Engineering School in Berhampur is typically accredited by the State Council for Technical Education & Vocational Training, Odisha, and is recognized by the All India Council for Technical Education. These accreditations ensure that the institution meets specific educational standards and that its diploma programs in engineering fields are recognized for their quality.
- Affiliations: AICTE, State Council for Technical Education & Vocational Training
- Principal: Er. Sushant Kumar Patra
- Students: 1400
- Location: 8R5F+WV8 UCP Engineering School, Engineering School, Gajapati Nagar, Berhampur, Odisha, 760010, India; 19.309509°N 84.824694°E
- Website: ucpesbam.in
- Location in Odisha Location in India Location in Asia Location on Earth

Uma Charan Pattnaik Engineering School (UCPES), formerly known as Berhampur Engineering School, is a government engineering school in Berhampur, Odisha, India. Established in 1956, the institution is named after Uma Charan Patnaik, a freedom fighter and parliamentarian.

The school is affiliated with the State Council for Technical Education & Vocational Training and is under the administrative control of the Director of Technical Education and Training, Odisha. It offers three-year diploma programmes in engineering disciplines, with an annual intake of 441 students and an overall enrolment of about 1,400 students.

The campus is located in Kalapuri Mouza, Berhampur, and occupies 49.785 acres of land held by the Industries Department, Government of Odisha.

== Academic structure ==
The college provides 3-year Diploma Engineering in Engineering branches : civil engineering, computer science engineering, Mechanical engineering, Electrical engineering, chemical engineering, Bio Tech engineering, electronics and telecommunication engineering, a two-year diploma for ITI, +2 holders as lateral entries is also offered. All courses are full-time. Each academic year consists of two semesters and a summer term. The education system is organized around a credit system, which ensures continuous evaluation of a student's performance and provides flexibility to choose courses to suit the student's ability or convenience. Each course is assigned credits depending upon the class hours.

== Facilities ==
The institution is running in a single campus having two large buildings. The old two storied building houses administrative block along with the departments of Civil Engineering, Mechanical Engineering, Electrical Engineering, drawing halls, class rooms, Edusat hall, Communication Skill Laboratory & Computer Centres. The new three storied building constructed under World Bank Assisted Project accommodates the departments of Computer Science Engineering, Information Technology, Chemical Engineering, Bio Technology & Electronics & Telecommunication Engineering, LRUC hall & Gymnasium etc. The institution has a separate workshop building which houses fitting shop, machine Shop, turner section, welding shop, carpentry shop and smithy. With Two boy's hostel and one Girl's Hostel are available and one each cricket field, basketball court, tennis court and volleyball court are available.

== Admission ==
The intake into Diploma courses is made through the SAMS each year by the government of Odisha. And administrative control of Director of Technical Education and training Orissa, Cuttack.

== Examination ==
Registration is required at the beginning of each semester. Students appear for examination for registered courses only. Students are eligible to appear for examinations provided they attend a minimum of 75 per cent of their theory, practical, and sessional classes scheduled during the semester, and per semester having 750 marks but only first Semester or second semester mark is 700,50% of total mark in first and second semester is considered, over all in Three Year Diploma having 3750 marks, and minimum 35% is required for pass.

== Events ==
- EXUBURANCE is the college's cultural extravaganza held annually in March.
- Welcome is the freshers' party.
- Annual farewell party.
- Celebrate the bishwakarma puja every year.

== Departments ==
- Bio Tech Engineering
- Civil Engineering
- Chemical Engineering
- Computer Science and Engineering
- Electrical Engineering
- Electronics and Telecommunication Engineering
- Information Technology Engineering
- Mechanical Engineering
- Math and science department
