= State Council for Technical Education & Vocational Training =

Educational institution in Odisha, India

Coordinates: 20.27°N 85.84°E

State Council for Technical Education & Vocational Training, Odisha
- Type: Diploma, Technical Education& Vocational education
- Established: November 1976
- Affiliations: AICTE, DTET
- Chairman: Sanjay Kumar Singh
- Location: Bhubaneswar, Odisha, India
- Campus: Unit 8, Raj Bhawan, Bhubaneswar
- Website: sctevtodisha.nic.in

State Council for Technical Education & Vocational Training (SCTE & VT) is located in the city of Bhubaneswar, Odisha, India. The board is managing the Diploma & ITI education in Orissa, which is affiliated to AICTE, New Delhi, recognized by Government of Odisha. According to SCTE & VT, there are almost 124 private and 35 state government diploma colleges in the Odisha state which include polytechnic, Diploma institutes & 637 ITI institutes, prevailing under this board, which produces skilled laborers & techno-entrepreneurial workforces for State SMEs industry.

== Courses offered for Diploma ==
State Council for Technical Education & Vocational Training (SCTE & VT) gives 3 years of Diploma for regular & 2 year Diploma for lateral entry, with engineering courses and non engineering courses of:

1. Automobile Engineering
2. Architectural Assistant-ship
3. Civil Engineering
4. Electrical Engineering
5. Chemical Engineering
6. Mechanical Engineering
7. Applied Electronics & Instrumentation Engineering
8. Food Engineering
9. Electronics & Telecommunication Engineering
10. Computer Science & Engineering
11. IT Engineering
12. Mining Engineering
13. Metallurgical Engineering
14. Ceramic engineering
15. Biotechnology
16. Mechatronics Engineering
17. Pharmacy
18. Modern Office Management
19. Beauty Culture
20. Hotel Management & Catering Technology (HM&CT)

More over SCTE & VT offers 3 years course for Diploma in Film and Television at Biju Pattanaik Film and Television Institute of Odisha (BPFTIO), Cuttack with specialization of:

1. Cinematography
2. Sound and TV Engineering
3. Film and Video Editing

Since year 2017 SCTE & VT has tied up with polytechnics of other state of India especially West Bengal with approval of MHRD to offer courses related to Print, Multi-Media Technology and Photography to selected students who are interested during counselling and admission process for the courses offered at Regional Institute of Printing Technology, Kolkata.

== Courses offered for ITI ==
State Council for Technical Education & Vocational Training (SCTE & VT) gives 1 and 2 years of Craftsman Training Scheme (CTS) with ITI training for regular ITI courses of Engineering and Non Engineering Trades of:

1. Electrician
2. Welder (Gas & Electric)
3. Electronic Mechanic
4. Fitter
5. Driver-cum-Mechanic
6. Carpenter
7. Instrument Mechanic
8. Data Entry Operator
9. Civil Draughtsman
10. Refrigerator and AC Mechanic
11. Information and Communication Technology system Mechanic
12. Motor Vehicle Mechanic
13. Laboratory Assistant
14. Plastic Processing Operator
15. Pump Mechanic
16. Die and Tool Maker
17. Foundry man Technician
18. Plumber
19. Diesel Mechanic
20. Tractor Mechanic
21. Lift and Escalator Mechanic
22. Vessel Navigator
23. Fabrication
24. Production and Manufacturing
25. Sewing Technology
26. Dress Making
27. Food and Vegetable Processing
28. Stenographer
29. Computer Operator
30. Baker and Confectioner

== Admission process ==
Students are admitted into polytechnic, diploma, ITI training and craftsman training through web portal of Student Academic Management System SAMS (e-Admission process) which is maintained by Department of skill development and technical education under Department of Higher Education, Odisha government of Odisha state for ITI and Diploma engineering and non engineering admission.

== List of State Government Run Diploma & Poly technical Colleges ==
There are 35 state government run Diploma & Poly-technique colleges in Orissa.

Sl.No.	COLLEGE NAME
1	Government Polytechnic, Bhubaneswar
2	Bhubanananda Orissa School of Engineering (BOSE), Cuttack
3	Orissa School Of Mining Engineering (OSME), Keonjhar
4	Indira Gandhi Institute of Technology (IGIT), Sarang
5	Government Polytechnic, Balasore
6	Uma Charan Pattnaik Engineering School (UCPES), Berhampur
7	Government Polytechnic, Berhampur
8	Jharsuguda Engineering School (JES), Jharsuguda
9	Institute Of Textile Technology (ITT), Choudwar
10	Utkal Gourav Madhusudan Institute of Technology (UGMIT), Rayagada
11	S.K.D.A.V. Government Polytechnic, Rourkela
12	Utkalmani Gopabandhu Institute of Engineering (UGIE), Rourkela
13	Government Polytechnic, Angul
14	Government Polytechnic, Dhenkanal
15	Government Polytechnic, Bargarh
16	Government Polytechnic, Boudh
17	Government Polytechnic, Gajapati
18	Government Polytechnic, Jajpur
19	Government Polytechnic, Balangir
20	Government Polytechnic, Kandhamal
21	Government Polytechnic, Kendrapara
22	Government Polytechnic, Sambalpur
23	Government Polytechnic, Sonepur
24	Government Polytechnic, Nuapada
25	Government Polytechnic, Nayagarh
26	Government Polytechnic, Nabrangpur
27	Government Polytechnic, Kalahandi
28	Government Polytechnic, Koraput
29	Biju Pattanaik Film and Television Institute of Odisha, Cuttack

== See also ==
- Directorate of Technical Education & Training
