= Mohan Nayak =

Indian politician

Member of Parliament, Lok Sabha
- In office 1962–1967
- Succeeded by: Ananta Tripathi Sarma
- Constituency: Bhanjanagar, Odisha
- In office 1957–1962
- Constituency: Ganjam, Odisha

Personal details
- Born: 3 July 1921 Berhampur, Ganjam district, Odisha, British India
- Died: 26 September 1983 (aged 62) Berhampur, Orissa, India
- Party: Indian National Congress
- Spouse: Chandrama

Mohan Nayak (3 July 1921 – 26 September 1983) was an Indian politician. He was elected to the Lok Sabha, the lower house of the Parliament of India as a member of the Indian National Congress.

Was imprisoned in 1940 and 1941 for satyagraha and again in 1942 in the Quit India Movement.
