= Krushna Chandra Nayak =

Indian politician

Member of the Odisha Legislative Assembly
- Incumbent
- Assumed office 4 June 2024
- Preceded by: Subhash Chandra Behara
- Constituency: Chhatrapur

Personal details
- Party: Bharatiya Janata Party
- Profession: Politician

Krushna Chandra Nayak is an Indian politician. He was elected to the Odisha Legislative Assembly from Chhatrapur as a member of the Bharatiya Janata Party.
