= Diploma Entrance Test Odisha =

Diploma Entrance Test, Odisha is a complete state government controlled centralised entrance examination for getting admission to many government & private diploma engineering schools or polytechnics in Odisha. Students can get admission to Diploma Engineering, Diploma Non-Engineering like Hotel Management, Hospitality management & Film Making studies etc. after 10th, ITI & +2 Science.

== Examination Procedure ==
Candidates can appear in this examination after 10th, ITI or after +2 science. There is two types of admission done in this process. First one is freshers for getting admission to first semester or first year & another one is lateral entry, that is after ITI or +2 Science getting admission to second year or third semester. For freshers students the test is based on general Science & Mathematics, but for lateral students the test prospective is harder than the freshers students. Also the lateral students have only 20% over the whole seats and no reservation quota is available for them.
