= Bikram Kumar Panda =

Indian politician

Member of the Odisha Legislative Assembly
- Incumbent
- Assumed office 2019-2024
- Preceded by: Ramesh Chandra Chaupatnaik
- Constituency: Berhampur Vidhan Sabha constituency

Personal details
- Party: Biju Janata Dal
- Occupation: Politician

Bikram Kumar Panda is an Indian politician and a member of the sixteenth Odisha Legislative Assembly representing the Berhampur Vidhan Sabha constituency. He is a member of the Biju Janata Dal (BJD) party.
