= Directorate of Technical Education & Training, Odisha =

Directorate of Technical Education and Training, Odisha
- Former names: DTET, Odisha
- Type: Public
- Established: 1977
- Affiliations: AICTE, SCTE & VT, DGET
- Director: Reghu G., IAS
- Location: Cuttack, Odisha, India
- Campus: Killa Maidan, Buxi Bazar, Cuttack
- Website: www.dtetorissa.gov.in

Directorate of Technical Education and Training (DTET) is an education and training body in the Indian state of Odisha. It is an autonomous institution of the state Government of Odisha. It is affiliated with the Directorate General of Employment and Training (DGET), All India Council for Technical Education (AICTE), and State Council for Technical Education & Vocational Training (SCTE & VT).

DTET had its campus at Killa Maidan, Buxi Bazar, Cuttack. The current director is Reghu G., IAS.

Since 1977, DTET shared its admission procedure and syllabus for various diploma courses and industrial training in various engineering and non-engineering trades in the state with DGET, AICTE, and SCTE & VT.
