= Pradhan (surname) =

Indic surname

Pradhan " प्रधान " is a surname in the Indian subcontinent. It's mainly found among Kshatriya Hindus, also among Bengali Muslims.

== Background ==
The surname Pradhan originates from the ministerial title Pradhan, the head of a community. The title derives from the Sanskrit pradhāna meaning "most important, prime, chief or major".

== People ==
=== A ===
- Adrian Pradhan, Nepali musician
- Aishwarya Rutuparna Pradhan, Indian civil servant
- Ajay Pradhan, Indian cricketer
- Ajayanti Pradhan, Indian politician
- Alisha Pradhan, Bangladeshi actress and businesswoman
- Amar Roy Pradhan, Indian politician
- Amerika Pradhan, Indian politician
- Amitash Pradhan, Indian actor
- Amrit Prasad Pradhan, Nepali professor and founder of Amrit Campus
- Anoop Pradhan, Indian politician
- Arghya Roy Pradhan, Indian politician
- Atul Pradhan, Indian politician
- Ashish Pradhan, Indian footballer

=== B ===
- Bhushan Pradhan, Indian actor
- Bikash Pradhan, Indian cricketer
- Binod Pradhan, Indian cinematographer and director
- Biswajeet Pradhan, Indian spatial scientist and writer
- Buddhi Pradhan, Nepali cricket umpire

=== C ===
- C.K. Pradhan, Indian politician

=== D ===
- Dharmendra Pradhan, Indian politician
- Dhruba Bahadur Pradhan, Nepali politician
- Debabrata Pradhan, Indian cricketer
- Debendra Pradhan, Indian politician

=== G ===
- Gananath Pradhan, Indian politician
- Ganga Prasad Pradhan, Nepali pastor and writer
- Gangadhar Pradhan, Indian dancer
- Gauri Pradhan Tejwani, Indian actress and model

=== H ===
- Hari Prasad Pradhan, Nepali Chief Justice
- Hridaya Chandra Singh Pradhan, Nepali writer and social worker

=== J ===
- Jacob Pradhan, Indian politician
- Jagadish Pradhan, Nepali weightlifter
- Jagdish Pradhan, Indian politician
- Jaslal Pradhan, Indian boxer

=== K ===
- Kashiraj Pradhan, Sikkimese politician and journalist
- Keshab Chandra Pradhan, Indian politician
- Kishore Pradhan, Indian actor
- K. N. Pradhan, Indian politician

=== L ===
- Latika Pradhan, Indian politician

=== M ===
- Manasi Pradhan, Indian women's rights activist and author
- Mandil Pradhan, Nepali mountain biker
- Manoj Pradhan, Indian politician
- Mazharul Haque Prodhan, Bangladeshi politician
- Menuka Pradhan, Nepali actress

=== N ===
- Nagarjuna Pradhan, Indian politician
- Nahakul Pradhan, Sikkimese politician and journalist
- Narendra Pradhan, Indian politician
- Nibedita Pradhan, Indian politician
- Nikki Pradhan, Indian field hockey player
- Nitesh R Pradhan, Indian journalist and singer
- Nitin Pradhan, Indian-American Chief Information Officer
- Nityananda Pradhan, Indian politician

=== P ===
- Pallavi Pradhan, Indian actress
- Parashu Pradhan, Nepali writer
- Pranoti Pradhan, Indian actress
- Prasanta Pradhan, Indian politician
- Prem Dhoj Pradhan, Nepali musician
- Pushpa Pradhan, Indian field hockey player

=== R ===
- Raj Pradhan, Nepali cricketer
- Rajendra Pradhan, Nepali weightlifter
- Rakesh Pradhan, Indian footballer
- Ram Chandra Singh Pradhan, Indian politician
- Ramita Pradhan, Nepali politician
- R. D. Pradhan, Indian Administrative Service officer
- Renubala Pradhan, Indian politician
- Rifat Pradhan, Bangladeshi cricketer
- Rishiram Pradhan, Nepali judoka
- Rohan Pradhan, Indian music director
- Runa Pradhan, Nepali swimmer

=== S ===
- Sahana Pradhan, Nepali politician
- Sakshi Pradhan, Indian actress and model
- Saluga Pradhan, Indian politician
- Sanju Pradhan, Indian footballer
- Sapana Pradhan Malla, Nepali Supreme Court Judge
- Saraswati Pradhan, Indian politician
- Satish Pradhan, Indian mayor
- Shahnawaz Pradhan, Indian actor
- Shivam Pradhan, Indian actor
- S.N. Pradhan, Indian Director General of Narcotics Control Bureau
- Snehal Pradhan, Indian cricketer and journalist
- Sonalika Pradhan, Indian-Australian fashion designer
- Srichchha Pradhan, Nepali model
- Subhadra Pradhan, Indian field hockey player
- Sukumar Pradhan, Indian politician
- Sunil Pradhan, Indian medical researcher and writer
- Suryakant Pradhan, Indian cricketer

=== T ===
- Tapan Kumar Pradhan, Indian poet and writer
- Tejashri Pradhan, Indian actress
- Trilochan Pradhan, Indian scientist

=== V ===
- Vimla Pradhan, Indian politician
- Vishwajeet Pradhan, Indian actor
