= Nitesh R Pradhan =

Indian journalist

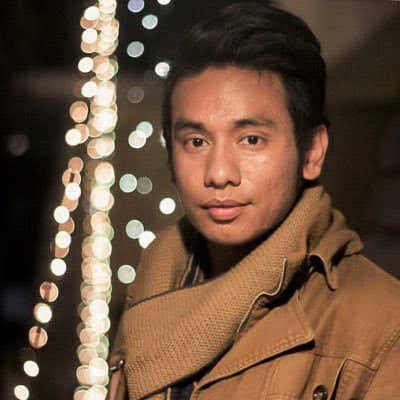
- Born: Gangtok, Sikkim, India
- Education: Tashi Namgyal Academy, Sikkim University
- Occupations: Journalist, Columnist, Singer and Lyricist
- Years active: 2013–present
- Organization(s): The Statesman, Assam Tribune, Sikkim Chronicle, The Voice of Sikkim, Eastern Himalayan News Service

Nitesh R Pradhan (Nepali: नितेश आर प्रधान, born 11 May 1990 as Nitesh Pradhan) is an Indian journalist based in Sikkim, India. He is a correspondent for RT. He is formerly Editor of The Voice of Sikkim online web portal and a correspondent for The Statesman. He is also a singer-lyricist as part of pop duo Anisha & Nitesh.

== Early life ==
He was born into a politically prominent Sikkimese Newar family to Pradip Pradhan and Renu Chettri in Gangtok. His paternal grandfather is Nahakul Pradhan, a leading figure of the democratic movement who also held cabinet positions in successive governments of the erstwhile Chogyal regime in Sikkim. He is a great-grandnephew of Kashiraj Pradhan, another prominent leader of the democratic movement, also considered as the Father of Sikkimese Journalism. His uncle, Sukumar Pradhan is a two-time former Member of the Sikkim Legislative Assembly. He is related to the erstwhile aristocratic family of the Newar Taksaris, his paternal great-grandmother, Kanti Pradhan was the granddaughter of Taksari Chandrabir Maskey of Pakyong, a Sikkimese lord of many estates in the former Kingdom of Sikkim.

== Education ==
He completed his schooling from Tashi Namgyal Academy, Gangtok. Later, he acquired a bachelor's degree in arts and completed post graduation in mass communication from Sikkim University.

== Career ==
He started singing in the pop duo Anisha & Nitesh since it was formed in 2013 – it was the first pop duo (mixed) act from Sikkim – and has released many Nepali language songs including the chartbuster Maya. His work in media includes print and digital media houses notably TNT- The Northeast Today, Sikkim Chronicle, Summit Times, Assam Tribune & East Mojo. He reports on a range of such topics as environment, geopolitics, gender, LGBTQ, society and culture of the Eastern Himalayan region. In 2020, he founded independent online news portal Eastern Himalayan News Service. He has also organised a series of fund raising events for charitable causes in Sikkim and Darjeeling hills. In 2021, he joined as editor in The Voice of Sikkim web portal - the oldest online media in Sikkim.

In 2022, he joined as Line producer for director Onir’s upcoming Hindi language film ‘’Pine Cone’’.

He has contributed articles, news and columns about Sikkim in many international, national and regional media.

== Awards ==
- 2019 - Sikkim Newar Guthi - Sikkim Newar Youth Icon Award
- 2021 - Federation of Consumer Association, Sikkim - Concerned Consumer Award
- 2024 - Press Club of Sikkim - Lagansheel Yuva Patrakar Purashkar
