= Manoj Pradhan =

Indian politician

- Organization: BJP
- Known for: Kandhamal riots
- Status: Convicted in 2 undertrial in 2
- Convictions: Murder (2008); Murder (2010)
- Criminal charges: 4 Murders (2008)
- Penalty: 7 year imprisonment (2008); 6 year imprisonment (2010)
- Capture status: On bail

Member of the Odisha Assembly for 10th Odisha Assembly from G. Udayagiri (Odisha Vidhan Sabha constituency)
- In office 2009–2014
- Preceded by: Ajayanti Pradhan
- Succeeded by: Jacob Pradhan

Manoj Pradhan is an Indian politician from the Bharatiya Janata Party, who was convicted of murder in January 2010. He was elected from the G. Udayagiri assembly constituency from the state of Orissa. He has been convicted in two cases of murder during the Kandhamal riots of 2008, in which 38 people were killed and more than 25,000 Christians were displaced. During the swearing-in of the state assembly, Pradhan was in jail but was given 15 days bail so he could participate.

== Background ==
Manoj Pradhan belongs to the Kandha tribe, and hails from Laburigaon village in Kandhmal district.

With 80% of the population living below the poverty line, Kandhamal is one of the poorest districts of India. The population is largely tribal, with the scheduled tribes of Kandha, constituting 55%, along with a minority of Pana tribals. Under circumstances of severe governmental neglect, Christian missionaries were able to convert many of the Pana, who had their own forms of religion, over the last five decades. The Kandha are largely Hindu or believe in local animistic faiths.

Over the last four decades, the Christian conversion was opposed by the Vishwa Hindu Parishad led by Swami Laxmanananda. In August 2008, Laxmanananda was murdered by a squad of armed Maoists, leading to widespread riots in which Manoj Pradhan had a leading role.

== Kandhamal riots ==
After Laxmanananda's murder, Hindu mobs were convinced that Christians, who may have been behind several earlier attacks on him, were behind the murder. Eventually, however, a Maoist couple, Surendra Vekwara and Ruby, who were alleged to have killed the Swami, surrendered to the Orissa police. The trigger had apparently been pulled by Maoist leader Udaya.

However, BJP leaders like Manoj Pradhan and Ashok Sahu incited Hindu mobs to attack the Christian Pano tribal villages. The mob set fire to many Christian settlements, killing at least 38 people. More than a thousand people are still living in Government refugee camps.

=== Indictment and arrest ===
During the investigations of the riot, Manoj Pradhan, though not named in the initial First Information Report, was charged in 12 cases under sections 147 (rioting), 148 (rioting with deadly weapon), 149 (unlawful assembly), 201 (causing disappearance of evidence of offence), 302 (murder), 341 (wrongfully restraining someone), 342 (wrongful confinement) and 436 (mischief by fire or explosive substance with intent to destroy houses etc.) of the Indian Penal Code/ Pradhan went into hiding, and was listed as one of the "most wanted" in police files. After his arrest in October 2008, the investigating officer Arun Ray, stated that much of the killing during the riots had been "planned much before".

During the investigation of the riots, Manoj Pradhan emerged as one of the firebrand leaders of the mob; police dossiers describe him as "the field commander" who led the rampaging mobs. On 15 October 2008, he was injured in a shootout during a period when the armed constable Bakshis Singh of the elite Central Reserve Police Force was killed while trying to protect the minorities. Pradhan had to undergo hospital treatment, and was staying at a lodge in Berhampur that night when he was arrested. The riots died down the same month.

== 2009 elections ==
For the Indian general election in Orissa, 2009, the Bharatiya Janata Party inducted Pradhan, who had little political experience, as its candidate for the state legislature from the G Udaygiri constituency. The induction of a riot-accused as a representative of one of the main political parties raised considerable criticism, but was defended by party spokesman Nayan Mohanty, who claimed that charges against him had been "fabricated".

In the run-up to the elections, Naveen Patnaik, leader of the Biju Janata Dal broke his ties with the BJP, saying that "the alliance in the state had to be broken because it became impossible for him to stay with the saffron party after the Kandhanmal riots which horrified the entire world".

Although the BJP did very poorly in the elections, failing to win a single seat in parliament, it won two of the three state assembly seats in the Kandhmal district. In the 2009 Odisha Legislative Assembly election, Pradhan won the G Udaygiri seat, defeating the sitting Member of the Legislative Assembly Ajayanti Pradhan of the Indian National Congress by 20,000 votes. Pradhan became a Member of the Legislative Assembly, but could not attend the oath-taking ceremony since his bail application was rejected by a court in Phulbani. Eventually the high court granted him bail and he was able to take the oath a few days late.

=== Summary of results of the 2009 Assembly Election ===
2009 Vidhan Sabha Election, G. Udayagiri
Party	Candidate	Votes	%	±%
BJP	Manoj Kumar Pradhan	45,009	43.92	−
INC	Ajayanti Pradhan	21,074	20.56	−
BJD	Luko Sunamajhi	15,818	15.44	−
Independent	Saluga Pradhan	10,715	10.46	−
BSP	Shyamaghan Pradhan	2,068	2.02	−
Independent	Nameswar Sunamajhi	2,027	1.98	−
Independent	Pradeep Kumar Konhar	1,840	1.80	−
Independent	Menaka Pradhan	1,559	1.52	−
Independent	Sanjaya Pradhan	1,428	1.39	−
SP	Philmon Pradhan	938	0.92	−
Majority		23,935	23.36 (Note: %of total valid votes)	−
Turnout		1,02,536	65.45	−

== Murder convictions ==
On 29 June 2010, a fast-track court set up after the Kandhamal riots found Manoj Pradhan guilty of the murder of Parikhita Digal, a Christian from Budedi village who was killed by the mob on 27 August 2008. Pradhan was sentenced to seven years rigorous imprisonment. However, after his election he was granted bail by the High court on 6 July.

On 9 September 2010, another judge found Pradhan guilty in the murder of Bikram Nayak from Budedipada on 26 August 2008. He was sentenced to six years imprisonment in this case.

These are two of the 12 cases relating to the Kandhamal riots in which Manoj Pradhan has been charged; there are two other murder cases yet to be decided.

State Legislative Assembly
Preceded by Ajayanti Pradhan (INC)	Member of the Odisha Legislative Assembly from G. Udayagiri Assembly constituency 2009 – 2014	Succeeded by Jacob Pradhan (INC)
