= Prafulla Chandra Pradhan =

Indian politician

Member of Odisha Legislative Assembly
- Incumbent
- Assumed office 2024
- Preceded by: Saluga Pradhan
- Constituency: G. Udayagiri

Personal details
- Party: Indian National Congress

Prafulla Chandra Pradhan is an Indian politician from Odisha and a member of Odisha Legislative Assembly from G. Udayagiri. He is a member of the Indian National Congress.
