= Meilleur Events =

Indian-Australian event

- Type: Events and Entertainment Company
- Industry: Entertainment
- Founded: 2016
- Founder: Sonalika Pradhan
- Headquarters: Melbourne, Australia
- Area served: Australia and India
- Key people: Ojasvi Pradhan and Dhruvika Pradhan
- Owner: Ojasvi Pradhan
- Number of employees: 15 (2023)
- Website: meilleurevents.au

Meilleur Events is an Indian-Australian events and entertainment company founded by Sonalika Pradhan in 2016. It is headquartered at the Melbourne, Australia. The company is owned by Ojasvi Pradhan, son of Vishwajeet Pradhan and Sonalika Pradhan.
