= Jharlangi =

Forced peasant labour in feudal Sikkim

Jharlangi was a practice of obligatory labour provided by the peasants in feudal Sikkim to officials and state visitors. Jharlangi was a type of forced labour imposed by the Kazis and Thikadars of Sikkim to the Sikkimese peasantry.
