= Jacob Pradhan =

Indian politician

Personal details
- Political party: Indian National Congress

Member of the Odisha Assembly for G. Udayagiri (Odisha Vidhan Sabha constituency)
- In office 2014–2019
- Preceded by: Manoj Pradhan (BJP)
- Succeeded by: Saluga Pradhan (BJD)

Jacob Pradhan is an Indian politician from the Indian National Congress, who was elected in 2014 from the G. Udayagiri (Odisha Vidhan Sabha constituency) at G. Udayagiri in the state of Orissa.

== Career ==
=== 2014 elections ===
In the 2014 Odisha Legislative Assembly election, Pradhan won the G Udaygiri seat, defeating the sitting Member of the Legislative Assembly Manoj Pradhan of the Bharatiya Janata Party.

==== Result ====
In 2014 election, Indian National Congress candidate Jacob Pradhan defeated Biju Janata Dal candidate Pradeep Kumar Pradhan by a margin of 10,289 votes.

2014 Vidhan Sabha Election, G. Udayagiri
Party	Candidate	Votes	%	±%
INC	Jacob Pradhan	48,958	39.82	19.26
BJD	Pradeep Kumar Pradhan	39,669	31.45	16.01
BJP	Managobinda Pradhan	27,295	22.2	−21.72
AOP	Pradeep Kumar Mallick	3,205	2.61	
NCP	Menaka Pradhan	1,867	1.52	
Independent	Sanjaya Kumar Pradhan	1,156	0.94	
NOTA	None of the above	1,790	1.46	−
Majority		10,289	8.37	−14.99
Turnout		1,22,940	71.04	5.59
Registered electors		1,73,047		
INC gain from BJP				

=== 2019 Elections ===
In 2019, he was denied assembly election ticket by Congress. He contested the election as an independent and lost the seat to Saluga Pradhan of Biju Janata Dal.

==== Result ====
2019 Vidhan Sabha Election, G. Udayagiri
Party	Candidate	Votes	%	±%
BJD	Saluga Pradhan	53238	38.61	
INC	Shyamghana Pradhan	41977	30.45	
BJP	Archana Pradhan	35998	26.11	
Independent	Jacob Pradhan (incumbent)	1920	1.31	
Independent	Pushara Kanhar	1492	1.08	
Independent	Pratap Kumar Pradhan	1238	0.9	
NCP	Asish Mallik	1074	0.78	
NOTA	None of the above	938	0.68	
Majority				
Turnout		1,37,875	68.67	
Registered electors		2,00,776		
[[Saluga Pradhan|Saluga Pradhan]] gain from Jacob Pradhan		Swing		

State Legislative Assembly
Preceded by Manoj Pradhan (BJP)	Member of the Odisha Legislative Assembly from G. Udayagiri Assembly constituency 2014 – 2019	Succeeded by Saluga Pradhan (BJD)
