= Sukumar Pradhan =

Indian politician (1948–2021)

Member of the Sikkim Legislative Assembly
- In office 1984–1994
- Constituency: Central Pendam

Personal details
- Party: Sikkim Sangram Parishad, Sikkim Democratic Front

Sukumar Pradhan (born October 1948 - October 2021) also known as S.K. Pradhan was a member of the Sikkim Legislative Assembly for two consecutive terms from 1984 to 1994 representing Central Pendam constituency from Sikkim Sangram Parishad.

== Personal life ==
Eldest son of Sikkimese pro democracy leader Nahakul Pradhan and Naina Kumari Pradhan. He was born into the erstwhile aristocratic Newar Taksari family. His paternal grandmother Kanti Pradhan was the granddaughter of Taksari Chandrabir Maskey of Pakyong, an erstwhile Sikkimese feudal lord of many estates in Sikkim. He is survived by his four daughters: Chetan, Ritu, Sable and Dichenla.

== Career ==
He was elected from Central Pendam constituency for two consecutive terms(1984 to 1994). In Government of Sikkim, he held several positions as chairman of Sikkim Livestock Development Corporation, chairman of Sikkim Housing and Development Board and Sikkim Distilleries.

Later he joined Sikkim Democratic Front and served in various capacities as treasurer, general secretary and senior vice president.

He died in Siliguri on 28 October 2021 at the age of 73.

== Positions held ==
- 1984-89 - MLA - Central Pendam Constituency
- 1989-1994 - MLA - Central Pendam Constituency
