= Karma Paljor =

Indian journalist and television news anchor

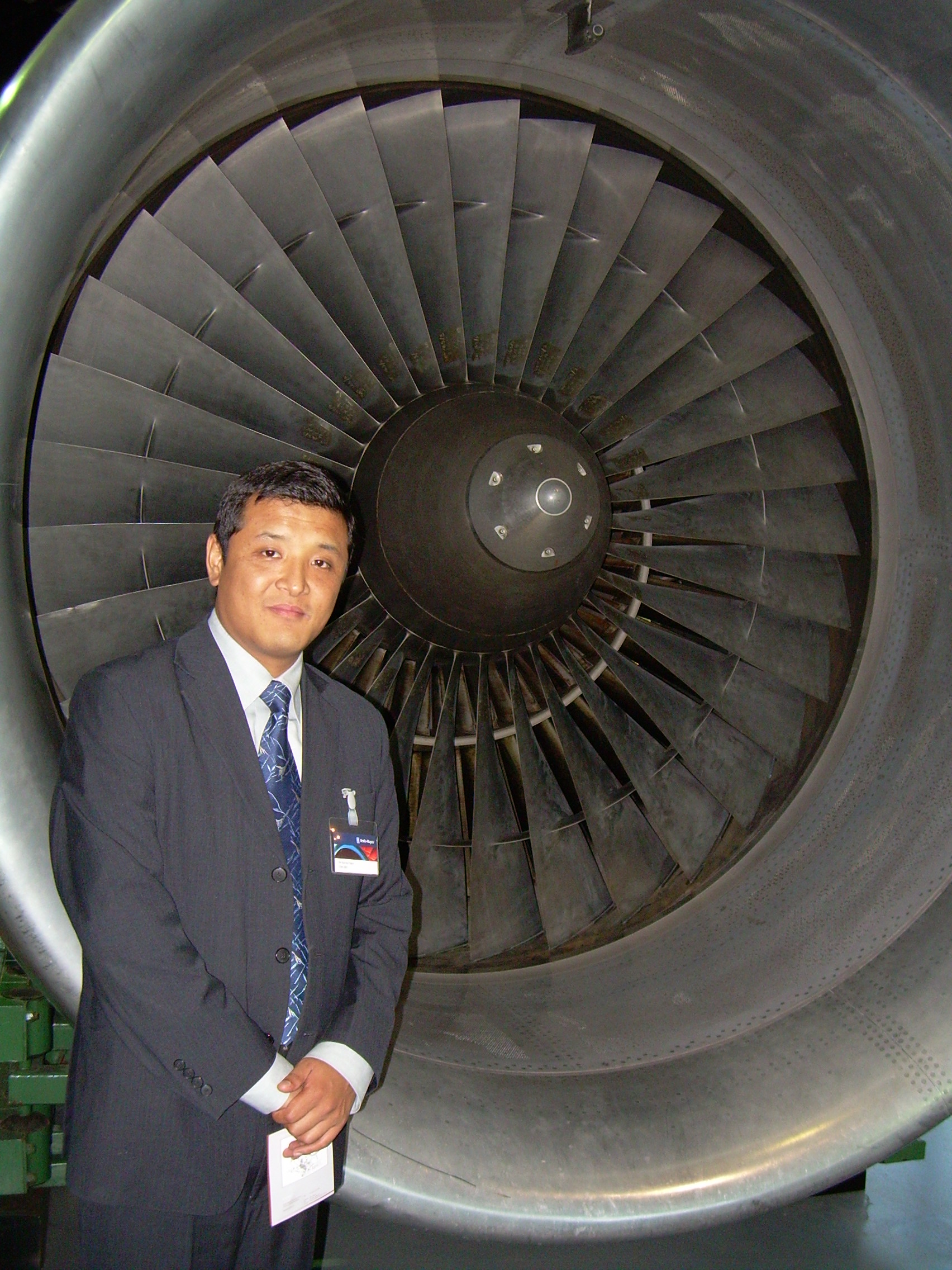
- Karma Paljor in 2006
- Born: Gangtok, Sikkim, India
- Education: Bangalore University; Xavier Institute of Communication
- Occupations: Journalist; news anchor
- Years active: 2001–present

Karma Paljor is an Indian journalist and television news anchor. His career as a media professional began in 2001 and he has been associated with news channels including CNN-News18. He has received several awards for his role as a reporter and for his coverage of natural disasters. He co-founded Atvi Infotainment, a content creation company in 2018. The business verticals include EastMojo and Atvi Studios.

== Early life and education ==
Psljor was born to a Bhutia family in Gangtok. After attending school in Tashi Namgyal Academy, at his birthplace Sikkim, India, Karma Paljor headed for graduation from Bangalore University and then post-graduation diploma from Xavier Institute of Communication, Mumbai.

== Career ==
Paljor started his career with The Times of India in Mumbai and moved to CNBC TV18 in 2001. Alongside covering national and political stories for the channel, Paljor anchored the breakfast show. He won the Chevening Scholarship for Broadcast journalism in 2004. He joined CNN-IBN in 2005 as a founding employee and has hosted every show on the channel. He specializes in covering aviation and natural disaster. He has planned and executed programs Budget Yatra, Axe the Tax, and Reporters Project. Some of his other shows were Cash Crisis Yatra, Interview with Jeff Bezos, India @9, Big 5 @10. He also headed the special features team.

== Awards and honors ==
Paljor was awarded the reporter of the year in 2010 by Indian Television at the News Television Awards. In 2011, he won the Ramnath Goenka Award for excellence in journalism in the category for Business and Economic Journalism. His team's coverage of the 2013 North India floods in Uttrakhand won the award for the Best National News Coverage in English at the Exchange4media News Broadcasting Awards (ENBA) in 2013. In 2014, Paljor won the ENBA Award in the Best Spot News Reporting (English) category for his coverage of Cyclone Phailin, which won him the Ramnath Goenka Excellence in Journalism Award for on-the-spot reporting in 2014.

== Sources ==
- "Karma Paljor: Exclusive News Stories by Karma Paljor on Current Affairs, Events at IBNLive". IBN Live.
