= Tashi Namgyal Academy =

Location
- Zero Point; PO Raj Bhavan; Gangtok – 737103 India
- Coordinates: 27°20′13.2246″N 88°36′58.1358″E

Information
- School type: Boarding cum Day school
- Motto: Learn To Serve.
- Established: c.1926; 100 years ago
- Founder: Sir Tashi Namgyal
- School board: CISCE
- School code: SI001 (CISCE)
- President: Mr. G. P. Upadhyaya
- Director: Brig. Mothi George Jacob (Retd.)
- Staff: 200
- Teaching staff: 119
- Age: 4 to 18
- Enrollment: 2000 (Approx.)
- Classes offered: Kindergarten to XII
- Language: English
- Campus: Urban
- Campus size: 12 acres (49,000 m^{2})
- Houses: Zongri; Yuksam; Karponang; Phensong
- Colours: Green; Yellow
- Song: The TNA Way
- Sports: Football, basketball, volleyball, cricket, swimming & taekwondo
- Publication: The TNA Echo
- Yearbook: Tenacius
- Affiliation: CISCE
- Uniform Colors: Grey; Navy Blue
- Website: tashinamgyalacademy.com

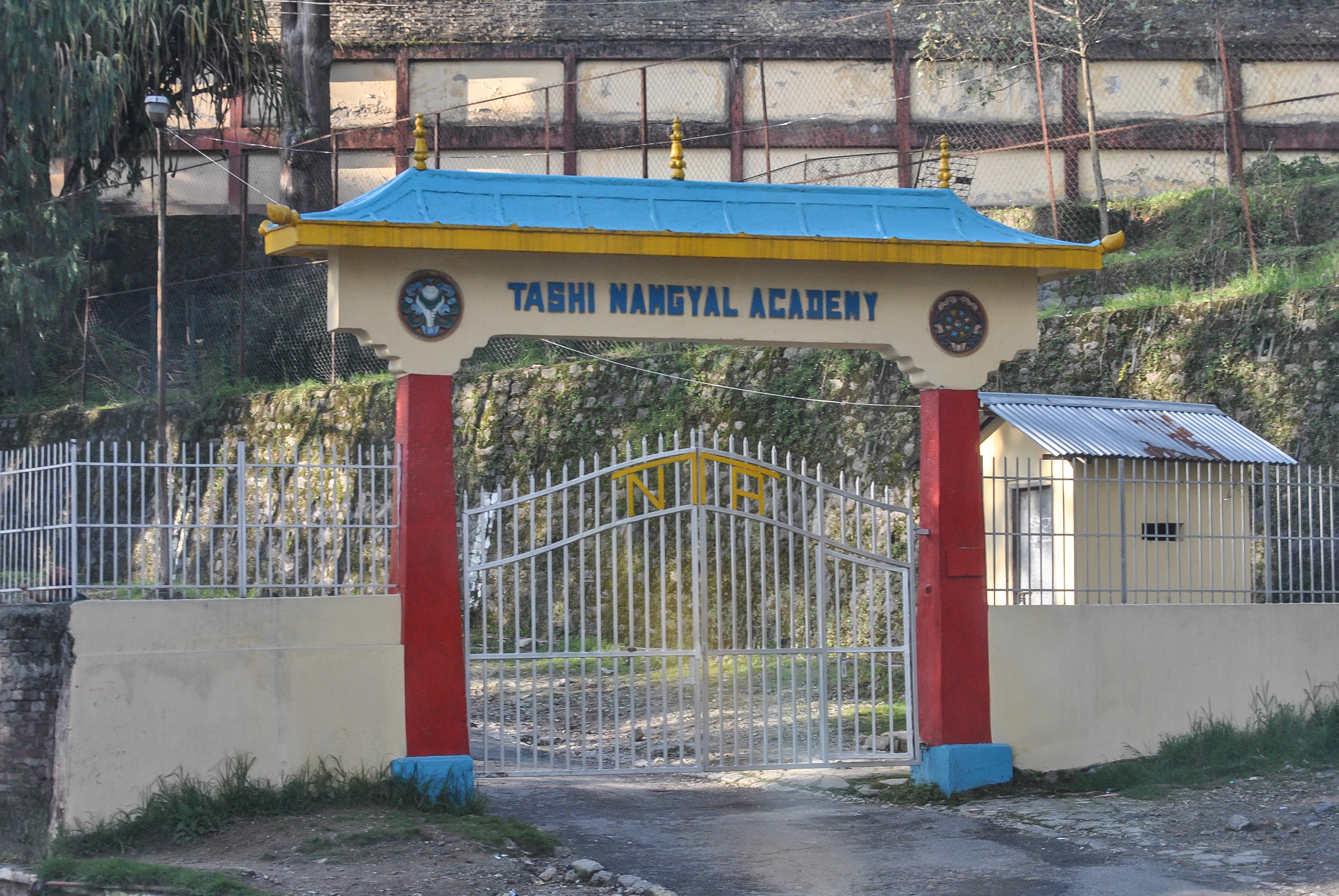
Tashi Namgyal Academy entrance

Tashi Namgyal Academy (TNA) is a public school in the Himalayan state of Sikkim in India. It was founded in 1926 by the late Sir Tashi Namgyal, KCSI, KCIE, the 11th consecrated Ruler of Sikkim. It is an autonomous English-medium, co-educational and residential-cum-day school.

== The Founder ==
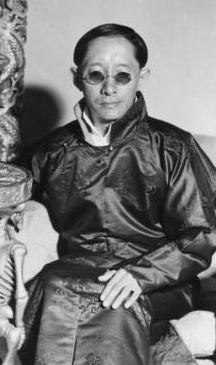
Sir Tashi Namgyal

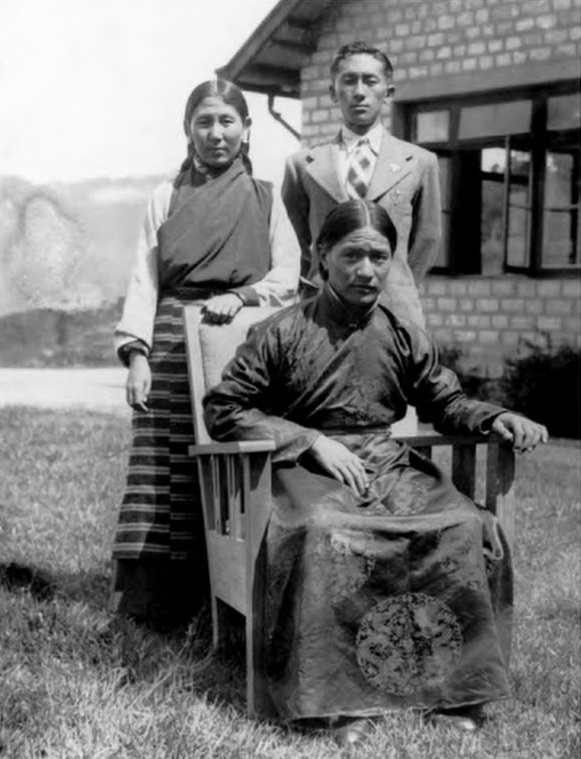
Dudjom Rinpoche with Prince Paljor Namgyal and Maharani Kunzang Dechen Tshomo Namgyal.

Sir Tashi Namgyal (Sikkimese: བཀྲ་ཤིས་རྣམ་རྒྱལ་; Wylie: Bkra-shis Rnam-rgyal) (26 October 1893 – 2 December 1963) was the ruling Chogyal (King) of Sikkim from 1914 to 1963. He was the son of Thutob Namgyal.

Namgyal was the 11th ruler of the Namgyal dynasty of Sikkim, succeeding his half brother Sidkeong Tulku Namgyal, who had ruled from February to December in 1914, till his death from heart failure. Born in Tibet and crowned by the 13th Dalai Lama, Thubten Gyatso, he was a strong advocate for closer links with India.

He was married in October 1918 to Kunzang Dechen, and they had 3 sons and 3 daughters. The eldest son, Prince Paljor Namgyal, died in 1941 in a plane crash during World War II. On his death he was succeeded as Chogyal by his second son Palden Thondup Namgyal.

During his reign, he is known for land reform and free elections. He also favoured closer links between Sikkim, India and Tibet. Many people attribute his death to Indian agents.

About a decade after his death, his son Palden Thondup Namgyal, the incumbent hereditary Chogyal was formally deposed. Prime Minister Lhendup Dorji appealed to India to change the status of Sikkim from protectorate to statehood. On 16 May 1975, Sikkim was officially made the 22nd state of Indian.

== Beginnings ==
Tashi Namgyal Academy was founded in 1926 by the late Sir Tashi Namgyal, K.C.S.I. & K.C.I.E., the eleventh consecrated Ruler of Sikkim. The present Academy was shaped out of Sir Tashi Namgyal High School which was affiliated with Calcutta University. As a High School it was headed by three headmasters at various times, Mr. C.E. Dudley was the first headmaster. He established the school in the military barracks used by troops of Sir Francis Younghusband in 1903. Mr. A.K. Sarkar took over from Mr. Dudley and Mr. K.L. Kapoor was the last headmaster in the line.

In 1956, Sir Tashi Namgyal took a decision to establish a public school in Sikkim. In April 1956, Mr. V.N. Langer, M.A (English), M.A. (Economics), LL.B. L.T., a Housemaster from Daly College, Indore was offered a post of Principal. He was entrusted with the task of organizing a new school and reorganizing the old one on modern lines, Mr. N.K. Rustumji, ICS, the then Dewan of Sikkim, was a driving force in drawing out plans for a school which was to run on public school lines. Prince Palden Thondup Namgyal, second son of the Founder, along with Dewan N.K. Rustumji and Mr. V.N. Langer formed an excellent team to reorganize the school on public school lines, and they were the people who were the main architects of Tashi Namgyal Academy. A Governing Body for the administration, management and control of Sir Tashi Namgyal High School, Gangtok was constituted under the Chairmanship of Maharaja Kumar Saheb.

Plans were drawn up first for the additional buildings for the public school and work started on some of these in 1957. The school was visited by the Prime Minister, Shri Jawaharlal Nehru on 1 October 1958 who stated: "It is a pleasure to visit this school so delightfully situated, young as it is, it has already developed well and the boys are bright and attractive looking. All best wishes for its progress."

In addition to this the then Political Officer of Sikkim and Bhutan, Shri Apa B. Pant, too, visited this school on 25 October 1958 and left behind the following comments; "Whenever I visit this school, I see each time change-change for the better. I am sure that under able guidance of Shri Langer this school will develop into an institution where not only future citizens of Sikkim will learn to serve their country, but where sectarianism, communalism, bigotry, small mindedness, pursuit of power will have no place. Let us hope that this institution will guide the youth of Sikkim to become humane, compassionate and full of spirit of humanity and service and in short to follow Dharma."

The year 1959 was a landmark in the annals of the institution. On the opening of the Annexe of Tashi Namgyal Academy, the main school building on 14 April 1959, Tashi Namgyal outlined the reason for which the school was renamed as Tashi Namgyal Academy. He said, "In the past it has been difficult for children of poor parents to enjoy the advantage of the best possible schooling as they could not afford admission to the more highly organized institution in Darjeeling, Kalimpong and elsewhere. It has been decided, therefore, to build up an institution in Sikkim itself which would stand comparison with the best institution of its kind outside the country. This institution would not be a substitute for, but in addition to the normal type of High Schools that has been established in other parts of Sikkim. As, however, the standard of teaching would be of a higher level of a special nature, the institution being designated as an "Academy"."

In course of time, when we also have been able to establish, in addition to the Academy the usual pattern of High School in Gangtok, the fees for admission to the Academy will be proportionately raised. But the Darbar will ensure that there will be ample scope for meritorious children of poor parents to gain admission to the Academy on the result of Competitive Scholarship Examinations.

Tashi Namgyal Academy states it will provide a higher quality of schooling within Sikkim itself, also to impart a pattern of education particularly suited to special needs of Sikkim. The academy also has a motto which is "Service Through Knowledge". The new school crest has been designed on the pattern of traditional Sikkimese Art. It portrays the sword that cuts away ignorance, symbolizing knowledge, while the Mountains that form the background are the mountains of the motherland, the sacred peak of Khangchendzonga. The crest symbolizes the spirit of the Academy, which is the seeking of knowledge not for its own sake, but for service to country and in the spirit of Sikkim’s culture and religious heritage.

"In opening this new Annex, I express my confident hope that Academy will in due course, rear citizens of whom Sikkim will have reason to be proud, that it will grow in stature and gain in luster as the cradle of Sikkim’s future generations and so the molder of her destiny." Maharaja Kumar Palden Thondup Namgyal, the Chairman of the Governing Body, on the occasion of the opening of the Annex said, "The Principal objective of the Darbar has been to provide education that will be consistent both with the culture, heritage and economic conditions of Sikkim. So that youths of Sikkim may grow into people with love for one’s country and heritage and useful citizens of Sikkim".

On 26 May 1959, the Rules concerning Departmental procedures of the Academy and on 24 December 1959 Financial and Administrative Powers of the Principal were defined. With the additional buildings and a defined campus, the Junior Section was started with classes from Kindergarten to class III. Increase in students roll necessitated another hostel in the two-storied building then known as Northern Block, half for Nepali boarders and half for Bhutia-Lepcha boarders with a dining hall at the site now occupied by Science Block with separate kitchens for Nepali and Bhutia-Lepcha boys. The old junior school block where Lower Kindergarten classes were held then served as the Hall with a capacity of approximately 300 people with a low stage.

In October 1961, the Auditorium was opened with a seating capacity of 600 built at a cost of Rs. 3 Lakhs. The same year the school was upgraded to the Higher Secondary Level (Class XI) and the first batch passed out in 1964. In May 1964, another New Hostel was added across the Football field (the present Boys’ Hostel), the campus was demarcated with two main gates, the upper Gate and the Main Lower Gate, and both built in traditional Sikkimese architecture.

In 1964 the idea of reorganizing Tashi Namgyal Academy on public school lines as coeducational institution was implemented. It was decided to have in the beginning only seven classes starting from Kindergarten to VI as the highest class and then to go on adding one higher class every year till it reached class XI, the Final School Certificate Stage. This policy, it was hoped, would enable to build up an institution in which even through medium of instruction and the first language English it would remain Sikkimese in its tradition and culture.

It was decided to follow the outline approved for the Anglo-Indian schools. A school uniform had been designed and selection of textbooks done. The first prospectus was published in 1965 and admissions to various classes of the public school were declared open simultaneously. Posts of teachers were advertised in the leading newspapers and tenders for uniforms were invited from local dealers. In March 1966, Tashi Namgyal Academy was reorganized along Public-School lines with English as the medium of instruction and the first language. This idea led to the shifting of Sir Tashi Namgyal Higher Secondary School to the Development Area in Gangtok, along with approximately 14 members of teaching staff and majority of students especially from classes VII and above.

Facilities for all round development of the faculties through large variety of cultural activities were provided. There were hobbies such as painting, woodcraft, leather work, dance, drama, music, sewing, and knitting. The major games played were football, volleyball, badminton, table tennis, basketball, hockey, netball, baseball, and cricket. It is the only school in Gangtok to have a swimming pool at this altitude.

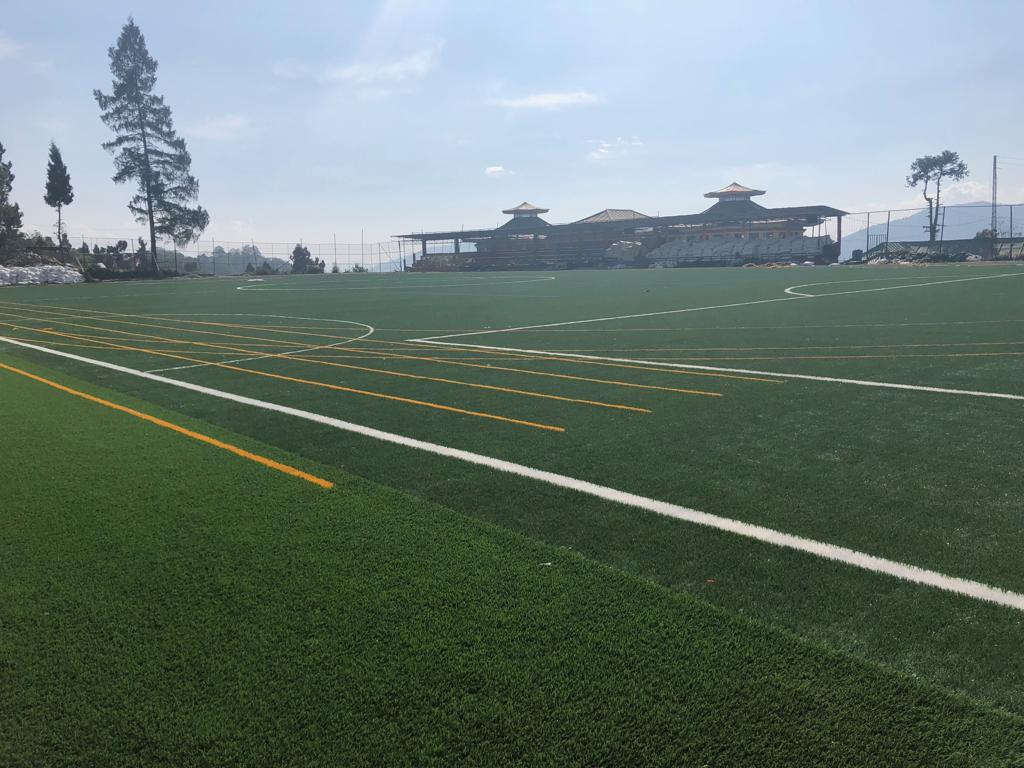
New artificial turf at TNA 2019

The school is also the only one to have an artificial turf after Paljor Stadium in Gangtok. The annual Inter House 3-day Track and Field sports meet is called the Mini Olympics and has the ceremonial lighting of fire too.

Some of the elder staff of Higher Secondary School who had been retained, gallantly rose to meet the pressing demands of the situation. Mrs. Langer, wife of the Principal, Mr. V.N. Langer, took over the responsibility of organizing the hostel and its routine so that it may be ready to receive the boarders when they come a day before the start of the session in March 1966. Altogether 130 students were on roll (both boys and girls), more than what was expected in the first year and more than what could be managed by the available staff. As days rolled by the staffing problem was solved to some extent. A new matron took over charge of the Hostel leaving Mrs. Langer free to devote herself to teaching work, two more teachers were appointed, one for additional section of K.G. class and the other to teach English to senior classes. A programme for weekly terminal tests also was drawn out and monthly and terminal reports made their appearance.

== Aims and objectives ==
The institution aims to provide sufficient academic knowledge for a child to be able to meet the standards required to complete their college course without much strain. The child must possess a healthy disposition to life, a reasoning mind, and an attitude of service. They must not be divorced from the social order and show good sportsmanship, be creative, unselfish, and courageous. They should not be afraid of truth and justice and have sufficient pride for their country's culture and heritage. They should not be afraid to face unpopularity or to maintain an independent opinion. They should show friendliness, good manners, and temper their emotions, showing discipline and responsibility.

== Campus ==
The school has a rectangular-shaped compound, measuring about 12 acres (49,000 m^{2}) bound by the National Highway (NH-10) to Nathula in the southwest and the road leading to Raj Bhavan in the northeast.

Starting from the Upper Main Gate down to the Lower Main Gate there is an open air-theatre, football ground, swimming pool, principal’s bungalow, three multi-storey buildings, 27 single and double unit staff quarters spread all over the school campus, two hostels for boys, one hostel for girls including hostel staff quarters, one kitchen and a hostel dining hall, a large auditorium with a capacity of 600 including a gallery, seven double/three-storey buildings for classrooms, Science Block (previously consisting of laboratories for Physics, Chemistry, Biology and Home Science, now shifted to the new Annex Block since 2006), Common Rooms, Workshops and an Administrative Block.

There is one greenhouse for cultivation of orchids and rare species of plants and facing it is a children’s park. The school has a library with over 25,000 books. There are three athletic fields, one each for football, volleyball, and basketball, and well laid out flower beds, sprawling lawns and green slopes spread all over the campus. It is adorned with pine and eucalyptus trees. The month of December sees the whole of campus turning pink with cherry blossoms.

== House System ==
The House system at Tashi Namgyal Academy was introduced at the very inception to promote healthy competition amongst students. The House flags with their respective emblems were designed at a later date. The four Houses are Yuksam House, Zongri House, Phensong House and Karponang House.

Emblems of the Various Houses
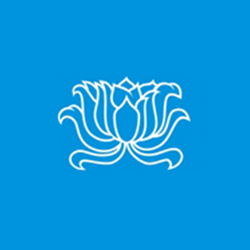
Zongri House

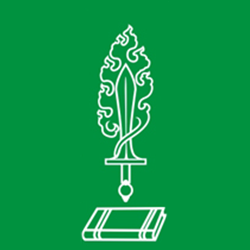
Phensong House

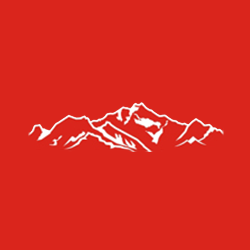
Yuksam House

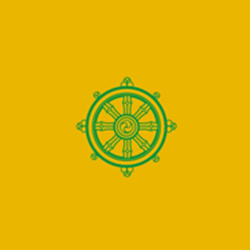
Karponang House

=== Yuksam House ===
Yuksam House is named after the historical site in West Sikkim where in 1642 AD. three Lamas from Tibet; Lhatsun Namkha Jigme Namgyal, Kathoke Sampa Chenpo and Ngadak Rinzing Chenpo met and crowned the first Chogyal (Dharma Raj) Phuntsok Namgyal, in accordance with the prophecy by Guru Rinpoche.

=== Zongri House ===
Zongri House is named after a mountain top just on the way to the Khangchendzonga base camp from where the entire Khangchendzonga massif is visible. It also lies in West Sikkim. The meaning of the word is derived from the words -'Zong' meaning fort and 'Ri' -meaning Hill.

=== Phensong House ===
Phensong House is named after a place on the way to Mangan, the District Headquarters of North Sikkim. The word is derived from the words phen − meaning benefit and song meaning excellence. The Monastery at Phensong attracts many visitors.

=== Karponang House ===
Karponang House is named after a place in East Sikkim on the way to the Nathula Pass. The original place name, according to its local history, is derived from a distortion of Nang Karpo. During the Younghusband Expedition to Tibet of 1903–1904, on seeing a white-colored house a British officer exclaimed "Karpo Nang!" Karpo means white, and Nang means house, so this can be literally translated as white house.

== Affiliation ==
The school is affiliated with the Council for the Indian School Certificate Examinations, New Delhi, established by the University of Cambridge Local Examinations Syndicate, UK, and prepares students for the Indian Certificate of Secondary Education (Class X) and the Indian School Certificate (Class XII) Examinations.

== Notable alumni ==
- Baichung Bhutia – former captain of the India national football team, Arjuna Award and Padma Shri awardee
- Prajwal Parajuly - Indian author
- Gadul Singh Lama - Indian writer of Nepali literature and Padma Shri awardee
- Geetanjali Thapa - actress
- Lall Bahadur Das - Speaker, Sikkim Legislative Assembly
- Karma Paljor, journalist and television news anchor
- Nitesh R Pradhan, journalist and singer-lyricist

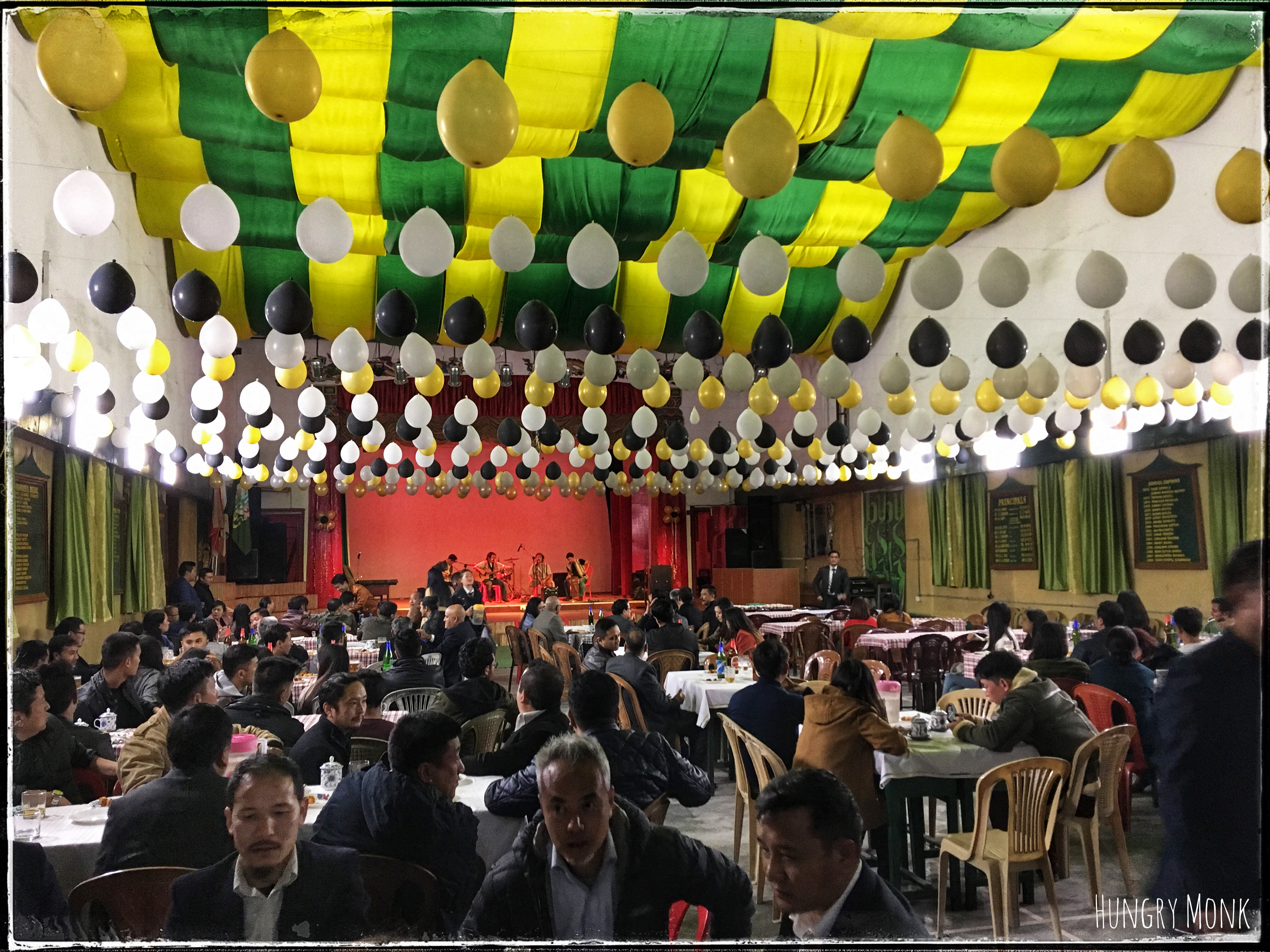
The TNA Alumni Meet gala dinner, 2018
