= Gadul Singh Lama =

Indian writer (1939–2025)

- Born: 15 June 1939; Gangtok, Kingdom of Sikkim
- Died: 12 July 2025 (aged 86); Siliguri, West Bengal, India
- Other name: Sanu Lama
- Occupations: Fictionist poet translator
- Known for: Nepali literature
- Parent(s): Chandraman Ghising; Phulmaya Ghising
- Awards: Padma Shri; Sahitya Akademi Award; Sikkim Bhanu Puraskar; Dr. Shova Kanti Thegim Smrithi Puraskar; Madan Byakhanmala Puraskar

Gadul Singh Lama (15 June 1939 – 12 July 2025), popularly known as Sanu Lama, was an Indian fiction writer, poet and translator of Nepali literature. He was an engineer by profession. He published three short story anthologies and his stories have been translated into English, Hindi, Urdu, Assamese and Oriya languages. He was a recipient of Sahitya Akademi Award (1993), apart from other awards such as Sikkim Bhanu Puraskar, Dr. Shova Kanti Thegim Smrithi Puraskar and Madan Byakhanmala Puraskar. The Government of India awarded him the fourth highest civilian honour of the Padma Shri, in 2005, for his contributions to literature.

== Life and career ==
Gadul Singh Lama was born on 15 June 1939 in Gangtok, in what is now the Northeast Indian state of Sikkim (but then Kingdom of Sikkim) to Chandraman Ghising and Phulmaya Ghising. After matriculating from the Sir Tyashi Namgyal High School (present day Tashi Namgyal Academy) in 1956 and, getting selected for the education initiative as a part of the 7 Year Development Programme of the government, secured a diploma in Engineering from MBC Institute of Engineering, Burdwan in West Bengal, in 1959. Later, he joined the Sikkim State government service as an engineer and served there for 38 years before superannuating as the Chief Engineer.

Lama started writing from his school days and is reported to have been inspired by one of his teachers, Rashmi Prasad Alley, a writer and one of the pioneers of Nepali education in Sikkim. His first article was published in Changya, a local literary magazine. He published his first short story anthology, Katha Sampad, in 1971, composed of stories such as Swasni Manchey, Khani Tarma Ekdin, Phurbhale Gaun Chadyo and Asinapo Manchey, which has since been selected as a prescribed text for the civil services examination of the Union Public Service Commission. This was followed by Gojika in 1981 and Mrigatrishna in 1993, the latter winning him the Sahitya Akademi Award for the year. He has also written an autobiographical novel, Himalchuli Manitira, a travelogue, Aangan Paratira, a poem anthology, Jahan BagcchaTista Rangit and two translated religious works, Bhagawan Bhiddha Jeewan ra Darshan and Guru Padmasambhava.

Sanu Lama was one of the founders of the Bhartiya Nepali Rashtriya Parishad and served as its secretary on its inception. He was a member of the Editorial Advisory Board of the National Book Trust (NBT) and served as the general secretary of the Nepali Sahitya Parishad Sikkim, an autonomous literary organisation under the Government of Sikkim. He was associated with the Sikkim Akademi, was a onetime member of the Advisory Board for Nepali literature of the Sahitya Akademi and the president of the Himalayan Writers' Forum. Besides the 1993 Sahitya Akademi Award, he received awards such as Sikkim Bhanu Puraskar, Dr. Shova Kanti Thegim Smrithi Puraskar and Madan Byakhanmala Puraskar. The Government of India included him in the 2005 Republic Day Honours list for the civilian honour of the Padma Shri. He lived in Gangtok, the capital of Sikkim, India.

Lama died in Siliguri on 12 July 2025, at the age of 86.

== See also ==
- Nepali literature
- List of Sahitya Akademi Award winners for Nepali
- Tashi Namgyal Academy
