= Nagarjuna Pradhan =

Indian politician

Personal details
- Party: Indian National Congress
- Spouse: Padmini Kumari Pradhan
- Children: Manoj Manjari Pradhan(daughter); Saroj Manjari Pradhan(daughter); Ameeya Ranjan Pradhan(son); Rajat Manjari Pradhan(daughter); Swarna Manjari Pradhan(daughter); Ashis Ranjan Pradhan(son)
- Relatives: Aditya Pradhan(grand son); Ayush Pradhan(grand son Avneey Ipsita Pradhan(grand daughter); Abhay Pradhan(grand son)

Member of the Odisha Assembly for G. Udayagiri (Odisha Vidhan Sabha constituency)
- In office 1980–2000
- Preceded by: Ranjit Kumar Pradhan (Janata Party)
- Succeeded by: Saluga Pradhan (BJD)

Nagarjuna Pradhan is an Indian politician from the Indian National Congress, who was elected in 1980 from the G. Udayagiri (Odisha Vidhan Sabha constituency) at G. Udayagiri in the state of Orissa.

== Career ==
=== 1980 elections ===
In the 1980 Odisha Legislative Assembly election, Pradhan won the G Udaygiri seat, defeating the sitting Member of the Legislative Assembly Ranjit Kumar Pradhan (Janata Party).

He won the elections four times in the following years.

- 1980: (103): Nagarjuna Pradhan (Congress-I)
- 1985: (103): Nagarjuna Pradhan (Congress)
- 1990: (103): Nagarjuna Pradhan (Congress)
- 1995: (103): Nagarjuna Pradhan (Congress)

State Legislative Assembly
Preceded by Ranjit Kumar Pradhan (Janata Party)	Member of the Odisha Legislative Assembly from G. Udayagiri Assembly constituency 1980 – 2000	Succeeded by Saluga Pradhan (BJD)
