= G. Udayagiri Assembly constituency =

Constituency of the Odisha legislative assembly in India

Coordinates: 20.12°N 84.37°E

G. Udayagiri
- Constituency No. 83 for the Odisha Legislative Assembly

Constituency details
- Country: India
- Region: East India
- State: Odisha
- Division: Southern Division
- District: Kandhamal
- Lok Sabha constituency: Kandhamal
- Established: 1951
- Total electors: 2,08,617 (Note: as on 2024) (Note: as data published by election commission)
- Reservation: ST

Member of Legislative Assembly
- 17th Odisha Legislative Assembly
- Incumbent Prafulla Chandra Pradhan
- Party: Indian National Congress
- Elected year: 2024

G. Udayagiri is a Vidhan Sabha constituency of Kandhamal district, Odisha.

Area of this constituency includes G. Udayagiri, G. Udayagiri block, Daringbadi block, Tikabali block and Raikia block.

== Elected members ==
Vote share of winning candidates
2024	37.06%
2019	38.61%
2014	39.82%
2009	43.92%
2004	48.76%
2000	50.08%
1995	49.73%
1990	49.78%
1985	58.25%
1980	54.15%
1977	53.73%

Since its formation in 1951, 17 elections were held till date.

List of members elected from G. Udayagiri constituency are:

Year	Member	Party
As Udaygiri Mohana Constituency
1951	Pattu Maliko	Indian National Congress
As G Udayagiri Constituency
1957	Sarangdhar Pradhan	All India Ganatantra Parishad
1961	Sarangdhar Padhi	Indian National Congress
As Udayagiri Constituency
1967	Gopal Pradhan	Swatantra Party
1971	Gopal Pradhan	Swatantra Party
1974	Gopal Pradhan	Indian National Congress
1977	Ranjit Kumar Pradhan	Janata Party
1980	Nagarjun Pradhan	Indian National Congress (I)
1985	Nagarjun Pradhan	Indian National Congress
1990	Nagarjun Pradhan	Indian National Congress
1995	Nagarjun Pradhan	Indian National Congress
2000	Saluga Pradhan	Biju Janata Dal
2004	Ajayanti Pradhan	Indian National Congress
As G. Udayagiri Constituency
2009	Manoj Kumar Pradhan	Bharatiya Janata Party
2014	Jacob Pradhan	Indian National Congress
2019	Saluga Pradhan	Biju Janata Dal
2024	Prafulla Chandra Pradhan	Indian National Congress

== Election results ==
=== 2024 ===
Voting were held on 20 May 2024 in 2nd phase of Odisha Assembly Election & 5th phase of Indian General Election. Counting of votes was on 4 June 2024. In 2024 election, Indian National Congress candidate Prafulla Chandra Pradhan defeated Bharatiya Janata Party candidate Managobinda Pradhan by a margin of 7,857 votes.

2024 Odisha Vidhan Sabha Election, G. Udayagiri
Party	Candidate	Votes	%	±%
INC	Prafulla Chandra Pradhan	53,530	37.06	
BJP	Managobinda Pradhan	45,673	31.62	
BJD	Saluga Pradhan	40,373	27.95	
NOTA	None of the above	1,507	1.04	
Majority		7,857	5.94	
Turnout		1,44,451	69.24	
INC gain from BJD				

=== 2019 ===
In 2019 election, Biju Janata Dal candidate Saluga Pradhan defeated Indian National Congress candidate Shyamghana Pradhan by a margin of 11,261 votes.

2019 Vidhan Sabha Election, G. Udayagiri
Party	Candidate	Votes	%	±%
BJD	Saluga Pradhan	53,238	38.61	
INC	Shyamghana Pradhan	41,977	30.45	
BJP	Archana Pradhan	35,998	26.11	
Independent	Jacob Pradhan	1920	1.31	
NOTA	None of the above	938	0.68	
Majority		11,261	8.16	
Turnout		1,37,875	68.67	
Registered electors		2,00,776		
BJD gain from INC				

=== 2014 ===
In 2014 election, Indian National Congress candidate Jacob Pradhan defeated Biju Janata Dal candidate Pradeep Kumar Pradhan by a margin of 10,289 votes.

2014 Odisha Legislative Assembly election: G. Udayagiri
Party	Candidate	Votes	%	±%
INC	Jacob Pradhan	48,958	39.82	▲19.26
BJD	Pradeep Kumar Pradhan	39,669	31.45	▲16.01
BJP	Managobinda Pradhan	27,295	22.2	▼21.72
NOTA	None of the above	1,790	1.46	−
Majority		10,289	8.37	▼14.99
Turnout		1,22,940	71.04	▲5.59
Registered electors		1,73,047		
INC gain from BJP				

=== 2009 ===
In 2009 election, Bharatiya Janata Party candidate Manoj Kumar Pradhan defeated Indian National Congress candidate Ajayanti Pradhan by a margin of 23,935 votes.

2009 Vidhan Sabha Election, G. Udayagiri
Party	Candidate	Votes	%	±%
BJP	Manoj Kumar Pradhan	45,009	43.92	−
INC	Ajayanti Pradhan	21,074	20.56	−
BJD	Luko Sunamajhi	15,818	15.44	−
Independent	Saluga Pradhan	10,715	10.46	−
Majority		23,935	23.36 (Note: %of total valid votes)	−
Turnout		1,02,536	65.45	−
BJP gain from INC				
