= Ajayanti Pradhan =

Indian politician

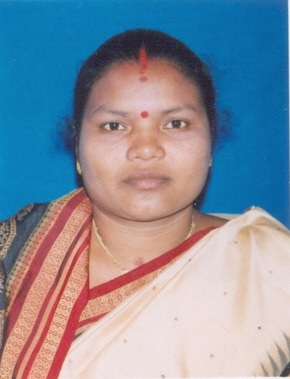

Personal details
- Party: Indian National Congress

Member of the Odisha Legislative Assembly
- In office 2004–2009
- Preceded by: Saluga Pradhan (BJD)
- Succeeded by: Manoj Pradhan (BJP)
- Constituency: G. Udayagiri (Odisha Vidhan Sabha constituency)

Ajayanti Pradhan is an Indian politician from the Indian National Congress, who was elected from the G. Udayagiri assembly constituency from the state of Orissa in 2004.

== Career ==
=== 2004 elections ===
In the 2004 Odisha Legislative Assembly election, Ajayanti Pradhan won the G. Udayagiri (Odisha Vidhan Sabha constituency).

In the 2009 Odisha Legislative Assembly election, Manoj Pradhan of the BJP won the G Udaygiri seat, defeating the sitting Member of the Legislative Assembly Ajayanti Pradhan, of the Indian National Congress by 20,000 votes.

State Legislative Assembly
Preceded by Saluga Pradhan (BJD)	Member of the Odisha Legislative Assembly from G. Udayagiri Assembly constituency 2004 – 2009	Succeeded by Manoj Pradhan
