= Kazis and Thikadars of Sikkim =

Ruling class in the former Kingdom of Sikkim

Kazis and Thikadars of Sikkim, also known as Ilakadars, were the hereditary feudal lords and the ruling class in former Kingdom of Sikkim. They had administrative and judicial powers within their respective land estates. This system existed since the establishment of the Namgyal dynasty and was further institutionalised under the period of British influence in Sikkim.

== History ==
Chogyal Phuntsog Namgyal (r. 1642–1670) appointed 12 Kalons or ministers from the Bhutia community and split his kingdom into 12 Dzongs or administrative units, which each contained a fort. Individual Dzongs were headed by a Dzonga drawn from amongst the Lepchas. The Limbu chiefs or the Subbas were also given full autonomy of their districts under the King.

After contact with the British, the agrarian Sikkimese society witnessed a drastic change in land use and settlement pattern. The British encouraged migration of Nepalese to Sikkim mainly for agriculture and labour. The two Newar trade families of Lachhimidas Pradhan and Chandrabir Maskey from princely estates of Kathmandu were given land as a contract or ‘’thika’’. These new landlords hence came to be known as Newar Thikadars.

In 1867, Newar trader Lachhimidas Pradhan was the first Nepalese to be given territories in East and South Sikkim by Khangsa Dewan and Phudong Lama by issuing a Sanad(ordinance). Lachhimidas and his brother Chandrabir Pradhan(Kasaju) divided the areas into number of estates to be distributed within the members of the family. During this period another Newar family led by Chandrabir Maskey settled in Sadam, South Sikkim. In the same year an agreement was reached between the two families where Chandrabir Maskey was given the Pendam, Temi, Regu, Pakyong and Chotta Pathing estates. Lachhimidas Pradhan and his family took control of the estate bordering Majitar to Kaleej Khola and Barmick in South Sikkim. His brother Chandrabir Pradhan(Kasaju) was given Rhenock, Mamring, Pache Khani, and Taja along with a joint supervision of Dilding and parts of Pendam. Ilakhas or estates of Sadam, Pachekhani, Dikling and parts of Pendam were put under joint supervision of both the families.

British Political Officer to Sikkim John Claude White introduced several administrative changes from 1888 onwards until in 1890, land estates was created with 70 Elakhas given to various landlord on lease. 36 estates were divided among different landlords of which 21 were Kazis, 6 Bhutias, 8 Lepchas, 10 Nepalese and 1 plainsman. All Taksaris of Sikkim were made Thikadars. Besides Kazis and Thikadars, Lamas also held land as Lords

By the end of nineteenth century lands of Sikkim were leased as gifts to many Kazis and Thikadars who in turn leased sub-plots to peasants at high rents. Mandals (headmen) and Karbaris (assistants to the mandals) were employed by the Kazis and Thikadars as rent collectors and dispute mediators. Out of Sikkim's 104 revenue estates, 61 were leased to Kazis and thikadars for fixed sums, five were given to monasteries and fifteen retained by the Chogyal for his private use.

In 1906, an order from the State Council gave the feudal landlords permanent rights to their respective estates.

=== Structure ===
Sikkim was divided into 90 estates or Ilakhas. Kazis were the Bhutia-Lepcha aristocracy while the Thikadars were the Nepali aristocracy. Each Kazi or Thikadar had several Mandals under them whose chief role was collection of taxes from people. The Mandals were further assisted by Baidar or Kamdari. The ruling Kazis and Thikadars were also part of Sikkim's former legislature and governing body, the State Council.

== Residence ==
Sikkimese feudal landlords resided with their families in a residence known as a Dzong or a Kothi (bungalow), which was accompanied with a Kuchcheri (court) that had jurisdiction over their respective land estate.

== Functions ==
After British introduced changes in administration of Sikkim in 1890, the role of Kazis and Thikadars largely replaced Dzongpens(District officers) as main agents of the government at regional level. They could collect taxes in the form of food grains or money under three types of tenancy systems: Adiya, Kutiya, and Mashikotta. The Sikkimese feudal landlords could also serve as "Forest Officers" to implement laws related to forests and were given a proportion of revenue collected from forest area of his estate.

== Rank within nobility ==
Kazis mostly from Lepcha and Bhutia communities were influential members of State Council of Sikkim. Thikadars who were granted lease landlordships were mostly from the Nepali Newars and enjoyed a position just below the Kazis. Later, Kazis and Thikadars were more or less given equal status as the institution evolved in Sikkim. British granted noble titles like Rai Sahib to many Kazis and Thikadars.

== Judicial powers ==
Adda Courts of the Kazis, Thikadars and Lamas were given judicial powers in 1909 through a resolution by State Council. These courts could try civil matters up to Rupees 500. The feudal landlords of Sikkim could punish peasants with then prevalent system of forced labour practices such as Kalo Bhari, Jharlangi and Kurwa.

== Abolishment ==
This system was abolished in 1951 after Land Reform Programme was initiated by the Sikkim government.

== Bibliography ==
- Arora, Vibha (2008). Commodities of Empire: Working Paper No.9. Open University.
- Bareh, Hamlet (2001). "Introduction". Encyclopaedia of North-East India: Sikkim. Mittal Publications. ISBN 978-81-7099-794-8.
- Chemjong, Iman Singh (2014), Kirat History and Culture, Narrator: Amar Nembang, Kirat Yakthung Chumlung, ASIN B00JH8W6HQ, GGKEY:PP03Y9PZZBD
- Chumlung, Yakthung (2014). Kirat History and Culture: All about south asian Monoglians. ASIN B00JH8W6HQ.
