= Biswajeet Pradhan =

Spatial scientist, modeler, and author

Professor Biswajeet Pradhan
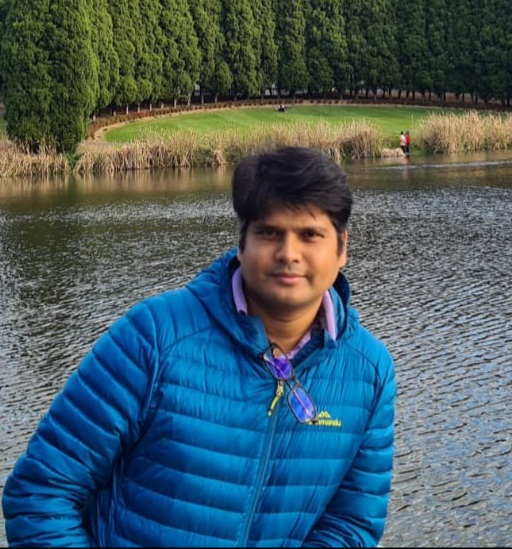
- Born: 1975 (age 50–51); Odisha, India
- Education: Berhampur University Indian Institute of Technology Bombay Indian Institute of Technology Kanpur Dresden University of Technology Universiti Putra Malaysia
- Occupation: Professor
- Employer: University of Technology Sydney
- Known for: Remote Sensing Geographic information system Geospatial predictive modeling Natural hazard
- Title: Director, CAMGIS
- Spouse: Sheila Patel
- Children: Krish Pradhan & Darsh Pradhan

Biswajeet Pradhan (born 1975) is a spatial scientist, modeller and author. He is now working as a Distinguished Professor and the founding Director of the Centre for Advanced Modelling and Geo-spatial Information Systems (CAMGIS), Faculty of Engineering and IT at the University of Technology Sydney, Australia. He is working primarily in the fields of remote sensing, geographic information systems (GIS), complex modelling, machine learning and Artificial intelligence (AI) based algorithms and their application to natural hazards, natural resources and environmental problems. Many of his research outputs were put into practice. His research platform is mainly Asia and Australia, and he has been sharing his findings worldwide. He is also a permanent resident of Australia and Malaysia.

== Education ==
Biswajeet Pradhan received his Bachelor of Science (Hons.) from the Berhampur University in Odisha, India, in 1995. Then, he furthered his studies at the Indian Institute of Technology (IIT) in Bombay, India. There, he was awarded a Master of Science in Remote Sensing/Applied Geology, in 1998. Later, he was awarded Master of Technology in Civil Engineering from the Indian Institute of Technology (IIT), Kanpur, India and Dresden University of Technology, Germany. He was awarded a PhD in 2006 in Geographical Information Systems (GIS) and Geomatics from the Universiti Putra Malaysia. In 2011, he has been awarded a Habilitation qualification in Remote Sensing from Dresden University of Technology (Germany), the highest academic qualification in several European countries.

== Early career (1998-2010) ==
Pradhan started his career as a Research Scientist with research at the Indian Institute of Technology (IIT), Kanpur and Dresden University of Technology, Germany from 1998 to 2002 serving for 2 years consecutively in each institution. In 2002, he was employed as a Senior Lecturer in the Department of Civil Engineering, Asian Institute of Medicine, Science and Technology, Malaysia. Here he was involved in teaching and research activities on new compression algorithms for laser scanning data. From 2005 to 2007, he was the Senior Manager at Cilix Corporation, Malaysia, where he undertook research and supervised R&D projects for the Malaysian Center for Remote Sensing under the Ministry of Science and Technology. Concurrently in 2007, he joined UPM as a research associate at the Institute of Advanced Technology. In 2008, he was awarded an Alexander von Humboldt Fellowship and spent two years at TU-Dresden (Germany) where he undertook research to develop geospatial modelling tools for landslide hazard and risk assessment

== Career in Malaysia and Australia (2011- till date) ==
Pradhan has been an active researcher and university professor (full), actively supervising postgraduate students and projects.

In 2010, Pradhan joined the Universiti of Putra Malaysia (UPM) as associate professor and promoted to a full professor in 2017. He was also the principal researcher at Geo-spatial Information Science Research Centre (GISRC), UPM.

Since September 2017, Pradhan is a research-only academic at the University of Technology Sydney. He is the founding director of Centre for Advanced Modelling and Geo-spatial Information Systems (CAMGIS). Biswajeet Pradhan leads a multi-disciplinary research at CAMGIS focusing on advanced spatial modelling, remote sensing, artificial intelligence (AI) applied to natural hazards and other environmental and urban problems.

== Achievements ==
He has been awarded as Highly Cited Researcher in the field of computer science for four years, with h-index of over 95. He was awarded the 2018 World Class Professor Award by the Indonesian Ministry of Research, Technology and Higher Education. In 2017, he was awarded with the Research Star Award by the Malaysian Ministry of Education. In recognition of his research excellence and important contributions to remote sensing and GIS, he was nominated as an Ambassador Scientist for the Alexander von Humboldt Foundation (Germany) to oversee research and networking opportunities between Germany and southeast Asian countries. He has been an invited keynote speaker and forum panel member for remote sensing scientific events both internationally and nationally on several occasions.

== Selected works ==
=== Journals ===
- Pradhan, Biswajeet; Lee, Saro (19 June 2010). "Landslide susceptibility assessment and factor effect analysis: backpropagation artificial neural networks and their comparison with frequency ratio and bivariate logistic regression modelling". Environmental Modelling & Software. 25 (6): 747–759. Bibcode:2010EnvMS..25..747P. doi:10.1016/j.envsoft.2009.10.016. Archived from the original on 23 March 2021.
- Pradhan, Biswajeet (2013). "A comparative study on the predictive ability of the decision tree, support vector machine and neuro-fuzzy models in landslide susceptibility mapping using GIS". Computers & Geosciences. 51 (11): 350–365. Bibcode:2013CG.....51..350P. doi:10.1016/j.cageo.2012.08.023. Archived from the original on 12 November 2020.
- Pradhan, Biswajeet; Lee, Saro (2009). "Delineation of landslide hazard areas on Penang Island, Malaysia, by using frequency ratio, logistic regression, and artificial neural network models". Environmental Earth Sciences. 60 (5): 1037–1054. doi:10.1007/s12665-009-0245-8. S2CID 128620489. Archived from the original on 19 March 2021.
- Pradhan, Biswajeet; Lee, Saro (2010). "Regional landslide susceptibility analysis using back-propagation neural network model at Cameron Highland, Malaysia". Landslides. 7 (1): 13–30. Bibcode:2010Lands...7...13P. doi:10.1007/s10346-009-0183-2. S2CID 140553195. Archived from the original on 19 March 2021.
- Pradhan, Biswajeet (2010). "Remote sensing and GIS-based landslide hazard analysis and cross-validation using multivariate logistic regression model on three test areas in Malaysia". Advances in Space Research. 45 (10): 1244–1256. Bibcode:2010AdSpR..45.1244P. doi:10.1016/j.asr.2010.01.006. Archived from the original on 18 January 2017.
- Neshat, Aminreza; Pradhan, Biswajeet; Shafri, HZM (2014). "Estimating groundwater vulnerability to pollution using a modified DRASTIC model in the Kerman agricultural area, Iran". Environmental Earth Sciences. 71 (7): 3119–3131. Bibcode:2014EES....71.3119N. doi:10.1007/s12665-013-2690-7. S2CID 140593734.

=== Books ===
- Pradhan, Biswajeet; Sameen, Maher Ibrahim (2020). Laser Scanning Systems in Highway and Safety Assessment: Analysis of Highway Geometry and Safety Using LiDAR. Advances in Science, Technology & Innovation. Springer International Publishing. ISBN 9783030103736. Archived from the original on 19 March 2021.
- Pradhan, Biswajeet, ed. (2019). GCEC 2017: Proceedings of the 1st Global Civil Engineering Conference. Lecture Notes in Civil Engineering. Vol. 9. Springer Singapore. doi:10.1007/978-981-10-8016-6. ISBN 9789811080159. Archived from the original on 19 March 2021.
- Pradhan, Biswajeet, ed. (2017). Laser Scanning Applications in Landslide Assessment. Springer International Publishing. doi:10.1007/978-3-319-55342-9. ISBN 9783319553412. S2CID 134766881. Archived from the original on 19 March 2021.
- Pradhan, Biswajeet, ed. (2017). Spatial Modeling and Assessment of Urban Form: Analysis of Urban Growth: From Sprawl to Compact Using Geospatial Data. Springer International Publishing. doi:10.1007/978-3-319-54217-1. ISBN 9783319542164. S2CID 185695118. Archived from the original on 19 March 2021.
