= Sonalika Pradhan =

Indian Fashion Designer

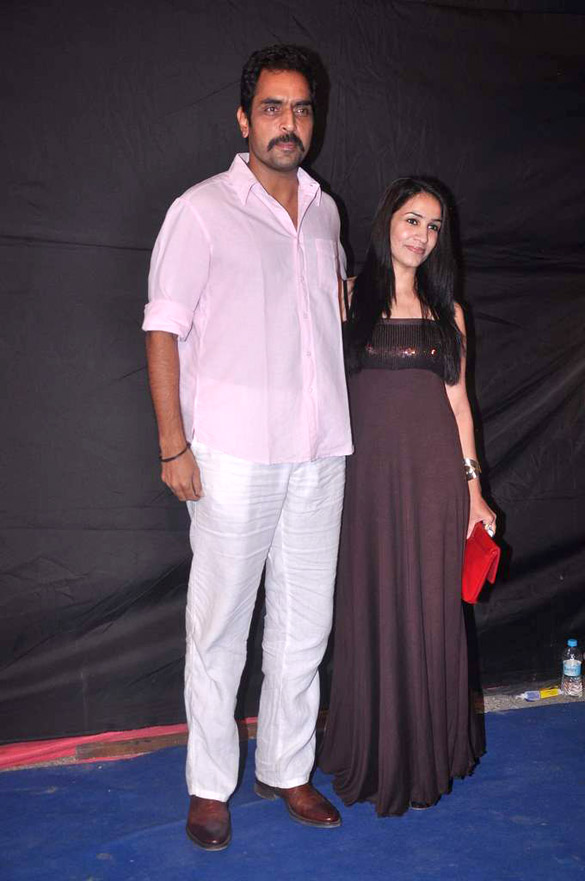
- Vishwajeet Pradhan and Sonalika Pradhan at Colors Indian Telly Awards
- Born: Sonalika Singh; 15 June 1978 (age 48); Meerut, Uttar Pradesh, India
- Education: Diploma in Fashion Designing
- Alma mater: INIFD Mumbai
- Years active: 2002–present
- Spouse: Vishwajeet Pradhan
- Parents: Rajeshwar Singh (father); Anju Singh (mother)

Sonalika Pradhan (born 15 June 1978) is an Indian-Australian fashion designer and event director. She is married to Actor Vishwajeet Pradhan. She is the CEO of Meilleur Events.

== Biography ==
Sonalika Pradhan was born on June 15, 1978, to Rajeshwar Singh and Anju Singh in Meerut, Uttar Pradesh, India. She completed Bachelor of Arts from R G Degree College, Bachelor of Education from CCS University Meerut and Diploma in Fashion Designing from INIFD Mumbai.

In 2014, she opened a store in Dubai.

She has directed and organised the Album and Book launch at ISKON, Mumbai in 2015 attended by Pandit Jasraj, Asha Bhosleji, and Hema Malini. She has organised Ozvaganza fashion Show & Lifestyle Exhibition in India and Australia in year 2016 attended by Sohail Khan, Smita Thackeray, and Vinod Kambli. She organised India Fashion Week Australia 2019 and 2022.

On 15 June 2017, Sonalika launched the Indian themed AFL Dress Collection, the first time in Australia that an Indian-themed dress was launched for the Australian Football League (AFL).

== Personal life ==
Sonalika Pradhan is married to Vishwajeet Pradhan and they have 2 children together.
