= Amerika Pradhan =

Indian politician

Member of the Uttar Pradesh legislative assembly
- In office 2007–2012

Personal details
- Born: 10 September 1965
- Died: 31 August 2020 (aged 54)
- Party: Bahujan Samaj Party

Amerika Pradhan (10 September 1965 – 31 August 2020) was an Indian politician who served as a member of the Uttar Pradesh 15th Legislative Assembly from Sadat, Ghazipur constituency between 2007 and 2012.
