= Kalo Bhari =

Kalo Bhari (Nepali: कालो भारी): is a type of forced labor in the era of the Namgyal dynasty in Sikkim where people were propelled to carry load of British consignment to the China via Tibet. Ethnologically Kalo Bhari is a Nepali word which means black loads. It was very despotic system during Zamindari or the landlords reign in Sikkim where the citizens were subjected to all kinds of hardships.

== Evolution of the Kalo Bhari system ==
The evolution of this practice was started in Sikkim after the contact with the British India. The literary meaning of the term Kalo Bhari in Nepali is Black Load. KALO BHARI [Black Load] was the name given to a special consignment compactly packed in black tarpaulin. The British sold arms and ammunitions to Tibet. The terrain and the inclement weather condition made the trading difficult. The commodities to save them from rain and snow were wrapped in card boards and put inside gunny bags bedaubed with tar. The tar protected the commodities from outside rain, and it also hid the commodities within. The black colour gave the load its local name Kalo Bhari or black load.
