= Taksaris of Sikkim =

Sikkim landed class

Taksaris
- Current region: Sikkim
- Origin: Kingdom of Sikkim
- Distinctions: Aristocracy, Rai Sahib

Taksaris of Sikkim (also known as Taksari Newars) were owners of minting houses, traders, landed class and their families in the former Kingdom of Sikkim. There were six families – mostly Newars – minting coins for the erstwhile Himalayan kingdom. In the period of British influence, Chogyal of Sikkim gave these families large land estates as Thikadars, a system of hereditary leesee landlords with judicial and administrative power over their respective estates.

== History ==
After contact with the British, the agrarian Sikkimese society witnessed a drastic change in land use and settlement pattern. The British encouraged migration of Nepalese to Sikkim mainly for agriculture and labour. The two Newar trade families of Lachhimidas Pradhan and Chandrabir Maskey from princely estates of Kathmandu were given land as a contract or ‘’thika’’. These new landlords hence came to be known as Newar Thikadars. They could mint coins as ‘’Taksaris’’, engage labourers to clear forests for agriculture and encourage human settlements in their estates.

In 1867, Newar trader Lachhimidas Pradhan was the first Nepalese to be given territories in East and South Sikkim by Khangsa Dewan and Phudong Lama under British influence by issuing a “Sanad”(ordinance) establishing a hereditary feudal estates. Lachhimidas and his brother Chandrabir Pradhan divided the areas into number of estates to be distributed within the members of the family. During this period another Newar family led by Chandrabir Maskey settled in Sadam, South Sikkim. In the same year an agreement was reached between the two families where Chandrabir Maskey was given the Pendam, Temi, Regu, Pakyong and Chotta Pathing estates. Lachhimidas Pradhan and his family took control of the estate bordering Majitar to Kaleej khola and Barmick in South Sikkim. His brother Chandrabir Pradhan(Kasaju) Chandrabir (Kasaju} was given Rhenock, Mamring, Pache Khani, and Taja along with a joint supervision of Dilding and parts of Pendam. “Ilakhas” or estates of Sadam, Pachekhani, Dikling and parts of Pendam were put under joint supervision of both the families.

Thikadars who were granted lessee landlordships were mostly from the Nepali Newars and enjoyed a position just below the Kazis. Later, Kazis and Thikadars were more or less given equal status as the institution evolved in Sikkim. British granted noble titles like Rai Sahib to many Kazis and Thikadars

== Families ==
Families of six traders - Lachhimidas Pradhan, Kancha Chandbir Pradhan, Chandrabir Pradhan Maskey of Pakyong, Jitman Singh Pradhan, Prasad Singh Chettri of Tarku Estate and Bharaddoj Gurung of Khani Goan were addressed as “Taksaris” who were given land estates on lease to mint coins.

== Legacy ==
The Newar Taksaris are considered accomplished in the fields of trade, administration, agriculture, arts and business. They are credited with bringing coinage system to Sikkim and contributing to economic and agricultural growth of the Himalayan state. The first cart road connecting Teesta with Gangtok was built by the Taksaris. Bazaars of Rangpo, Singtam, Rhenock and Rongli were established due to the efforts of the Taksaris of Sikkim. In the judicial history of Sikkim, some of the earliest courts established in the former kingdom was the “Adda” courts of the Kazis and Thikadars. A Taksari family's residence is known as a Kothi accompanied with a Kuchcheri(court) which had jurisdiction over their land estate. There are many well preserved Kothis and Kuchcheris across Sikkim under the possession of the descendants of the Taksaris. To encourage floriculture Chandra Nursery was established in Rhenock by Rai Saheb Ratna Bahadur Pradhan in 1910. Some descendents have also converted their traditional residencies into heritage hotels and museums. Many members of the Taksari families have held influential position in political, economical and social life of Sikkim.
