= Vishwajeet Pradhan =

Indian actor

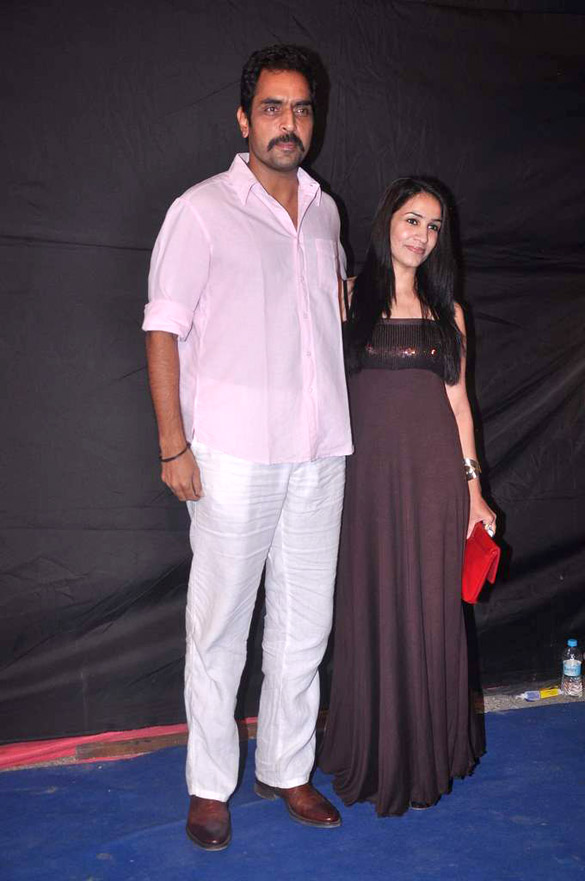
- Born: 11 September 1965 (age 61); Meerut, Uttar Pradesh, India
- Occupation: Actor
- Years active: 1988–present
- Spouse: Sonalika Pradhan
- Children: Dhruvika Pradhan and Ojasvi Pradhan

Vishwajeet Pradhan (born 11 September 1965) is an Indian actor who predominantly works in Bollywood films, theatre and television. He is well-known for his role as Pakistani Captain in Kya Dilli Kya Lahore and as Thakur Rudra Pratap in Ek Boond Ishq.

== Early life ==
Vishwajeet Pradhan was born on September 11, 1965, in Meerut, Uttar Pradesh.

== Incidents on sets ==
A major fire broke out on the sets of No Problem while the unit was shooting in the middle of the sea for a vital action sequence. Pradhan was in a scene where he is supposed to raise panic over the fire and try to save himself. While he caught fire, hurting his leg, everyone thought it was a part of his act and complimented his acting skills. But as soon as everyone realized what was happening, Pradhan was saved from any further injury by prompt action. Sunil Shetty also suffered burns on his hands. The fire extinguishers on the sets proved to be very handy. Suniel Shetty and Vishwajeet Pradhan almost became victims of severe burns. A hurt Pradhan said, "These things happen and despite all the precautions, the fire was just uncontrollable because of the sea breeze. My trousers were very thin. I guess it’s part of the game, but I am in pain right now. After the incident, I went to a doctor and even a skin specialist for treatment."

Another incident happened on sets of Rakht Charitra. Pradhan was apparently shooting the climax sequence for the film where his character was supposed to be shot dead. However the blast in the shot was so intense that he had a huge cut along his jaw line that required surgery. After the incident, he was admitted to an emergency ward and later shifted to the normal ward. A surgery was carried out later with a reconstructive plastic surgery carried out to hide the scar. The sequence in question was apparently a normal blast scene that went haywire as the impact was very powerful, hitting the actor in the face, leaving him bleeding. Naturally, the actor and his wife were worried as the wounds required serious attention.

== Personal life ==
He is married to fashion designer Sonalika Pradhan. They have two children, daughter Dhruvika Pradhan and son Ojasvi Pradhan.

== Partial filmography ==
Year	Film	Role
1989	In Which Annie Gives It Those Ones	
1991	Prahaar: The Final Attack	Commando
1992	Yalgaar	Jaychand
1994	Mohra	Jackson
1996	Jaan	Nagendra
1997	Ghulam-E-Mustafa	Mahesh's Brother
1998	Duplicate	Tony
1998	Zakhm	Sr. Inspector Yadav
1999	Aa Ab Laut Chalen	Marco (Drug dealer)
1999	Sangharsh	CBI Head
2000	Phir Bhi Dil Hai Hindustani	Head Police inspector
2000	Badal	Sahab Singh
2001	Style	Nainsukh
2001	Gadar: Ek Prem Katha	Daroga Sulemaan
2001	Pyaar Ishq Aur Mohabbat	Gaurav's Uncle
2002	Raaz	Ajay
2002	Gunaah	Revolutionist
2002	Karz: The Burden of Truth	Gogi
2002	Kyaa Dil Ne Kahaa	Esha's Brother
2002	Ab Ke Baras	Bali
2002	Rishtey	Madesh
2002	Saaya	Dr. A. Mehta
2003	Andaaz	Ishwar Singhania's brother
2003	Chalte Chalte	Vivek
2004	Agnipankh	Squadron Leader Sawant
2004	Bardaasht	Insp. Deepak Sawant
2004	Love (Malayalam)	Vishwa
2005	Karam	Yunus
2005	Khamoshh... Khauff Ki Raat	Sukhvinder
2005	Zeher	Inspector Sooraj Shah
2006	Umrao Jaan	Dilawar Khan
2007	Raqeeb	CBI Officer Pradhan
2009	Team: The Force	
2009	Chal Chalein	
2009	Shadow	Police Commissioner M.C. Singh Rajpoot
2010	Lamhaa	Daljeet
2010	No Problem	Dick Laura
2011	Bbuddah... Hoga Terra Baap	Sub-Inspector Shinde
2011	Chatur Singh Two Star	DGP Kulkarni
2014	Kya Dilli Kya Lahore	Pakistani Captain
2014	Dee Saturday Night	
2015	Ranviir the Marshal	Jampa
2020	Class of '83	Mangesh Dixit
2021	Haathi Mere Saathi	Divisional Forest Officer
2021	Dhamaka	Subhash Mathur
2021	Radhe	ACP Arjun

=== Television ===
Year	Serial	Role	Channel
1988	Fauji	N/Sub. Yaseen Khan	DD National
1989	Indradhanush	Joseph	DD National
2007	Ssshhhh...Phir Koi Hai	Ajbira	Star One
2010–2011	Maryada: Lekin Kab Tak?	S.S.P Brahmanand Jakhar	Star Plus
2013–2014	Ek Boond Ishq	Rudrapratap Thakur	Life OK
2019–2020	Tenali Rama (TV series)	Mahamatya Kaikala	Sony Sab
2020–2021	Aarya	Sampat	Disney + Hotstar
2023–2024	Shiv Shakti – Tap Tyaag Tandav	Maharaj Daksha	Colors TV
