= Saluga Pradhan =

Indian politician

Personal details
- Born: October 25, 1959 (age 66)
- Party: Biju Janata Dal

Member of the Odisha Assembly for G. Udayagiri (Odisha Vidhan Sabha constituency)
- In office 2000–2004
- Preceded by: Nagarjuna Pradhan (INC)
- Succeeded by: Ajayanti Pradhan (INC)

Member of the Odisha Assembly for G. Udayagiri (Odisha Vidhan Sabha constituency)
- In office 2019–2024
- Preceded by: Jacob Pradhan (INC)

Saluga Pradhan is an Indian politician from the Biju Janata Dal, who was elected from the G. Udayagiri assembly constituency from the state of Odisha in 2019.

== Career ==
=== 2019 elections ===
In the 2019 Odisha Legislative Assembly election, Pradhan won the G Udaygiri seat, defeating the sitting Member of the Legislative Assembly Jacob Pradhan of the Indian National Congress.

2019 Vidhan Sabha Election, G. Udayagiri
Party	Candidate	Votes	%	±%
BJD	Saluga Pradhan	53238	38.61	
INC	Shyamghana Pradhan	41977	30.45	
BJP	Archana Pradhan	35998	26.11	
Independent	Jacob Pradhan (incumbent)	1920	1.31	
Independent	Pushara Kanhar	1492	1.08	
Independent	Pratap Kumar Pradhan	1238	0.9	
NCP	Asish Mallik	1074	0.78	
NOTA	None of the above	938	0.68	
Majority				
Turnout		137875	68.67	
BJD gain from INC		Swing		

State Legislative Assembly
Preceded by Nagarjuna Pradhan (Congress)	Member of the Odisha Legislative Assembly from G. Udayagiri Assembly constituency 2000 – 2004	Succeeded by Ajayanti Pradhan (INC)
Preceded by Jacob Pradhan (INC)	Member of the Odisha Legislative Assembly from G. Udayagiri Assembly constituency 2019 –	Incumbent
