= G. Udayagiri =

G. Udayagiri Ghumusar Udayagiri
- Town
- Location in Odisha, India G. Udayagiri (India)
- Coordinates: 20.13°N 84.38°E
- Country: India
- State: Odisha
- District: Kandhamal
- Elevation: 715 m (2,346 ft)

Population (2001)
  - Total: 10,206

Languages
  - Official: Odia
- Time zone: UTC+5:30 (IST)
- PIN: 762100
- Vehicle registration: OD
- Website: odisha.gov.in

G. Udayagiri, or Ghumusar Udayagiri, is a town and a notified area committee in Kandhamal district in the state of Odisha, India.

== Geography ==
G. Udayagiri is located at 20.13°N 84.38°E. It has an average elevation of 715 m (2,346 ft).

== Demographics ==
As of 2001 India census, G. Udayagiri had a population of 10,206. Males constitute 49% of the population and females 51%. G. Udayagiri has an average literacy rate of 74%, higher than the national average of 59.5%: male literacy is 81%, and female literacy is 68%. In G. Udayagiri, 12% of the population is under 6 years of age.
