= Koraput Lok Sabha constituency =

Lok Sabha constituency in Odisha

Coordinates: 18.814545°N 82.708125°E

Koraput (ST) OD-21
- Lok Sabha constituency
- Interactive Map Outlining Koraput Lok Sabha constituency

Constituency details
- Country: India
- Region: East India
- State: Odisha
- Assembly constituencies: Gunupur; Bissam Cuttack; Rayagada; Lakshmipur; Jeypore; Koraput; Pottangi
- Established: 1952
- Total electors: 14,81,642 (Note: as on 2024) (Note: as data published by election commission)
- Reservation: ST

Member of Parliament
- 18th Lok Sabha
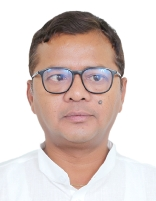
- Incumbent Saptagiri Sankar Ulaka
- Party: INC
- Elected year: 2024

Koraput is a Lok Sabha parliamentary constituency in Odisha. It's considered a bastion of Indian National Congress as it has won this seat for a record 16 times out of 18 elections including one bypoll . Former Chief Minister of Odisha Giridhar Gamang has represented this constituency for a record 9 times from 1972 to 2004.

== Assembly Segments ==
Assembly constituencies which constitute this parliamentary constituency are:

#	Name	District	Member	Party	Leading (in 2024)
138	Gunupur (ST)	Rayagada	Satyajeet Gomango	INC	INC
139	Bissam Cuttack (ST)	Rayagada	Nilamadhab Hikaka	INC	INC
140	Rayagada (ST)	Rayagada	Kadraka Appala Swamy	INC	INC
141	Lakshmipur (ST)	Koraput	Pabitra Saunta	INC	INC
143	Jeypore	Koraput	Tara Prasad Bahinipati	INC	INC
144	Koraput (SC)	Koraput	Raghuram Machha	BJP	INC
145	Pottangi (ST)	Koraput	Rama Chandra Kadam	INC	INC

== Elected members ==
Vote share of winning candidates
2024	41.03%
2019	34.34%
2014	30.39%
2009	25.68%
2004	45.5%
1999	50.33%
1998	53.92%
1996	57.59%
1991	66.14%
1989	56.41%
1984	68.52%
1980	64.6%
1977	55.06%
1971	42.84%

Since its formation in 1952, 18 elections have been held till date including one bypoll in 1972.

List of members elected from Koraput constituency are:

Year	Name	Party
As Rayagada Phulbani Constituency
1952	T. Sanganna	Indian National Congress
As Koraput Constituency
1957 (Note: It was a 2 member constituency)	R. Jagannath Rao	Indian National Congress
1957	T. Sanganna	Indian National Congress
1962	Ramachandra Ulaka	Indian National Congress
1967	Ramachandra Ulaka	Indian National Congress
1971	Bhagirathi Gamang	Indian National Congress
1972 (bypoll) (Note: Resignation of Bhagirathi Gamang)	Giridhar Gamang	Indian National Congress
1977	Giridhar Gamang	Indian National Congress
1980	Giridhar Gamang	Indian National Congress (I)
1984	Giridhar Gamang	Indian National Congress
1989	Giridhar Gamang	Indian National Congress
1991	Giridhar Gamang	Indian National Congress
1996	Giridhar Gamang	Indian National Congress
1998	Giridhar Gamang	Indian National Congress
1999	Hema Gamang	Indian National Congress
2004	Giridhar Gamang	Indian National Congress
2009	Jayaram Pangi	Biju Janata Dal
2014	Jhina Hikaka	Biju Janata Dal
2019	Saptagiri Sankar Ulaka	Indian National Congress
2024	Saptagiri Sankar Ulaka	Indian National Congress

== Election results ==
=== 2024 ===
Voting were held on 13th May 2024 in 4th phase of Indian General Election. Counting of votes was on 4th June 2024. In 2024 election, Indian National Congress candidate Saptagiri Shankar Ulaka defeated Biju Janata Dal candidate Kausalya Hikaka by a margin of 1,47,744 votes.

2024 Indian general election: Koraput
Party	Candidate	Votes	%	±%
INC	Saptagiri Sankar Ulaka	471,393	41.03	▲6.67
BJD	Kausalya Hikaka	323,649	28.17	▼5.85
BJP	Kaliram Majhi	232,514	20.24	▲0.95
NOTA	None of the above	37,131	3.23	▼0.15
Majority		147,744	12.86	▲12.52
Turnout		11,55,221	77.97	▲2.62
INC hold				

=== 2019 ===
In 2019 election, Indian National Congress candidate Saptagiri Shankar Ulaka defeated Biju Janata Dal candidate Kausalya Hikaka by a margin of 3,613 votes.

2019 Indian general elections: Koraput
Party	Candidate	Votes	%	±%
INC	Saptagiri Shankar Ulaka	371,129	34.36	▼3.62
BJD	Kausalya Hikaka	367,516	34.02	▼5.91
BJP	Jayaram Pangi	208,398	19.29	▲10.20
NOTA	None of the above	36,561	3.38	0.02
BSP	Bhaskar Mutuka	35,764	3.31	0.22
API	Banamali Majhi	18,849	1.75	0.25
CPI(ML)L	Damodara Sabar	26,117	2.42	1.07
CPI(ML) Red Star	Rajendra Kendruka	15,827	1.47	+0.5
Majority		3,613	0.34	▼1.61
Turnout		1,080,669	75.34	▲2.19
INC gain from BJD				

=== 2014 ===
In 2014 election, Biju Janata Dal candidate Jhina Hikaka defeated Indian National Congress candidate Giridhar Gamang by a margin of 19,328 votes.

2014 Indian general elections: Koraput
Party	Candidate	Votes	%	±%
BJD	Jhina Hikaka	395,109	39.93	
INC	Giridhar Gamang	375,781	37.98	
BJP	Shibashankar Ulka	89,788	9.07	
BSP	Praska Renga	34,957	3.53	
NOTA	None of the above	33,232	3.36	−
Majority		19,328	1.95	−
Turnout		990,657	76.18	
Registered electors		1,300,437		
BJD hold				

=== 2009 ===
In 2009 election, Biju Janata Dal candidate Jayaram Pangi defeated Indian National Congress candidate Giridhar Gamang by a margin of 96,360 votes.

2009 Indian general elections: Koraput
Party	Candidate	Votes	%	±%
BJD	Jayaram Pangi	312,776	41.00	
INC	Giridhar Gamang	216,416	28.37	
BJP	Upendra Majhi	111,690	14.64	
Majority		96,360	12.63	
Turnout		762,826	62.64	
BJD gain from INC				
