= Chandrama Santha =

Indian politician (1938–2021)

Member of the Orissa Legislative Assembly
- In office 1980–1990
- Preceded by: Jayaram Pangi
- Succeeded by: Jayaram Pangi
- Constituency: Pottangi

Personal details
- Born: 5 May 1938
- Died: 21 June 2021 (aged 83)
- Party: Indian National Congress
- Spouse: Malu Santha

Chandrama Santha (5 May 1938 – 25 June 2021) was an Indian politician who served in the Orissa Legislative Assembly from 1980 until 1990. A member of the Indian National Congress, she represented the Pottangi constituency.

== Biography ==
Chandrama Santha was born on 5 May 1938. Her husband, Malu Santha, served in the Orissa Legislative Assembly in the 1950s and 1960s. Santha worked as a farmer and was a part-time social worker. A member of the Indian National Congress, she was active in the Bhoodan movement and held several local government and party positions, serving on Pottangi's panchayat samiti; as president of the Koraput branch of the All India Mahila Congress; and as an executive member of the women's committee of the Odisha Pradesh Congress Committee.

In the 1980 election, Santha ran for the Orissa Legislative Assembly, standing in the Pottangi constituency, a seat reserved for members of a Scheduled Tribe. She defeated incumbent Jayaram Pangi of the Janata Party, receiving 62% of the vote to Pangi's 26%. She was re-elected in the 1985 election, narrowly defeating Pangi in a rematch, with 44% to Pangi's 43%. While in the legislative assembly, Santha prioritized the development of the local Scheduled Tribes; among her primary goals was the "upliftment of Adivasi and Harijan women", the prohibition of dowries, and the improvement of literacy. Santha was defeated by Pangi in the 1990 election, receiving just 20% of the vote compared to Pangi's 71%.

After her defeat, Santha remained active in local politics, serving as president of the Koraput district's zila panchayat from 2002 until 2007. She died from illness on 25 June 2021, aged 83. Among those who expressed condolences were chief minister Naveen Patnaik and the local MLAs.
