= Politics of Odisha =

The politics of Odisha are part of India's federal parliamentary representative democracy, where the union government exercises sovereign rights. Certain powers are reserved to the states, including Odisha. The state has a multi-party system, in which the two main parties are the nationalist Bharatiya Janata Party (BJP) and the regional, socialist Biju Janata Dal (BJD). The Indian National Congress (INC) has also significant presence.

== Present day ==
BJD leader and former chief minister Naveen Pattanaik, served as the 14th Chief Minister of Odisha from 5 March 2000 to 5 June 2024. Other parties represented in the assembly are the BJP who have defeated BJD in the 2024 elections, the Congress Party and the Communist Party of India (Marxist). Mohan Charan Majhi of BJP is the current Chief Minister of Odisha since 11 June 2024. The next assembly election is scheduled for 2029.

Odisha is represented by 21 members of the Lok Sabha, the lower house of the Indian parliament. They are elected from geographic constituencies. In the Rajya Sabha (the upper house of parliament), the state is represented by 10 members who are elected by the legislative assembly.

== History ==
Odisha was part of the Bengal Presidency during the British Raj. The presidency was split in 1912, creating Bihar and Orissa Province. In 1936, Orissa Province was created from the Odia-speaking areas of Bihar and Orissa Province and portions of the Vizagapatam Hill Tracts Agency and Ganjam Hill Tracts Agency.

The Government of India Act 1935 provided for the election of a provincial legislative assembly and government, and the head of government was designated as the prime minister. Assembly elections were held in 1937; the Indian National Congress won a majority of the seats, but declined to form a government. A minority provisional government was formed under Krushna Chandra Gajapati, the maharaja of Paralakhemundi. The Congress reversed its decision, and resolved to form a government in July 1937; the governor invited Bishwanath Das to do so. In 1939, with Congress ministers in other provinces, Das resigned in protest of the Governor-General's declaration of war against Germany without consulting Indian leaders. Orissa was under governor's rule until 1941, when Gajapati again became the premier until 1944. Another round of elections was held in 1946 with another Congress majority, and a government was formed under Harekrushna Mahatab.

With Indian independence the position of prime minister was replaced with that of chief minister, and Mahatab became Odisha's first chief minister. Most of the Odia-speaking princely states acceded to India, and were merged with Odisha. In 1951-52, the first elections were held under India's new constitution. Congress won a minority of seats, so failed to obtain a majority. A coalition government was formed by Nabakrushna Choudhury, with the support of several independents.

After Nabakrushna Choudhury, there was great political instability in Odisha during the 20th century. Chief Ministers changed frequently. It was Janaki Ballabh Patnaik who served for a good period. He was the first CM to complete full terms, also without coalition. His INC was defeated by Biju Pattnaik's Janata Dal in 1990. In turn, JD was defeated by INC in 1995. Later JB Pattnaik's image got demolished. Finally, it was Naveen Patnaik, who brought political stability in Odisha by serving for 25 years. He was the longest serving CM of Odisha.

In 2024, Mohan Charan Majhi of the Bharatiya Janata Party became the CM.

== Parties ==
The state has a mix of national and regional political parties:

Active Political Parties (Parties who have fielded their candidate & won significant seats in last two elections cycles)

- Biju Janata Dal (BJD) - A regional party headed by Naveen Patnaik and established in 1997. Leading the state government for 24 years, it won 40.22 percent of the vote and 51 seats in the 2024 elections. The party drew a blank in the 2024 Lok Sabha elections. tin 2024 election, Party's 24 years reign ended. Now, its in the Opposition.
- Bharatiya Janata Party (BJP) - National party, led by Narendra Modi. A coalition partner of the BJD from 1997 to 2009, it has been the ruling party since 2024. In the 2024 Vidhan Sabha election, the party won 40.07 percent of the vote and 81 seats. It also won 20 seats in the 2024 Lok Sabha elections.
- Indian National Congress (INC) - A national party which dominated state politics until 2000; since then, it has been in opposition. In the 2024 Legislative Assembly elections, the INC won 16.12 percent of the vote and 14 seats.
- Communist Party of India (Marxist) (CPM) - A national party, it won 0.3 percent of the vote and one seat in the 2024 Legislative Assembly elections. It used to win more than one seats in the past.

Passive Political Parties (Parties who have fielded their candidate in last two poll cycles)

- Communist Party of India (CPI) - A state party. It used to win a handful of seats in the 1970s. Now, it has limited presence in the state.
- Jharkhand Mukti Morcha (JMM) - A regional party in Jharkhand, headed by Hemant Soren. It was influential in areas neighbouring Jharkhand in Odisha. Its best performance was in 2004, when it won four assembly seats and one parliamentary seat. Now, it has limited presence in the state and allyies with Cong for elections.
- All India Trinamool Congress (TMC) - A regional party, headed by Mamata Banerjee, has minimal presence in the state . In 1999 election, it had won one seat (Patkura). Afterwards, it has not won any seat .

Former Political parties are:

- All India Ganatantra Parishad - Also known as the Ganatanra Parishad (GP), it was a regional party based in Odisha which was active from 1950 to 1962. Formed by former rulers of the princely states and large landlords, Rajendra Narayan Singh Deo was its president. In 1962, it merged with the Odisha branch of the Swatantra Party after the parliamentary elections. The party was the principal opposition twice, and was part of the coalition government in 1959.
- Swatantra Party - A classical liberal party, formed by C. Rajagopalachari in 1959. In the 1967 assembly elections, it won a plurality of the vote and formed a coalition government with Rajendra Narayan Singh Deo as chief minister and the Orissa Jana Congress as alliance partner. In subsequent assemblies, Swatantra was in opposition.
- Orissa Jana Congress - Formed in 1966 by former chief minister Harekrushna Mahatab after he left the Indian National Congress. After the 1967 elections, the Jana Congress participated in a coalition government with the Swatantra Party from 1967 to 1969. In the 1971 and 1974 elections the party won one seat, and merged into the Janata Party in 1977.
- Praja Socialist Party (PSP) - A national party formed by a merger of the Socialist Party (led by Jayprakash Narayan) and the Kisan Mazdoor Praja Party, led by J.B. Kripalani. In the 1957 assembly elections, it won 10 percent of the vote and 10 seats. Its best result was the 1967 elections, when it won 12 percent of the vote and 21 seats.
- Janata Party (JNP) - An amalgam of Indian parties opposed to the Emergency. In Odisha, the party formed a government in 1977 with Nilamani Routray as chief minister. The government lasted for two years, and fell when the Janata Party split up.
- Janata Dal - A national party formed through the merger of Janata Party factions, the Lokdal, the Indian National Congress (Jagjivan), and the Jan Morcha. In Odisha, the Janata Dal (led by Biju Patnaik) headed the state government from 1990 to 1995 and was the principal opposition from 1995 to 1997.
- Utkal Congress (UC) - Formed in 1969, when Biju Patnaik left the Indian National Congress. After the 1971 Odisha elections, UC won 33 seats and 23 percent of the vote. It was a partner in the Bishwanath Das-led coalition government. In 1974, the UC merged into Bharatiya Lok Dal.
- Odisha Gana Parishad (OGP)- A splinter group of the Biju Janata Dal, the party was founded on October 29, 2000, and led by Bijoy Mohapatra. In the 2004 elections, the OGP allied with the Indian National Congress. The party had four candidates for the state legislative assembly, two of whom were elected. In 2007, the OGP merged with the N C P.
- All India Jharkhand Party - A regional political party based in Jharkhand, with limited support in Odisha. In the 1971 elections, it won four assembly seats.
- Jharkhand Party (JKP) - Grew from support for a separate Jharkhand state, with limited support in Odisha. In the 1974 assembly elections, it won one seat.

== Chief ministers ==
The chief minister of Odisha is the head of government of the Indian state of Odisha. Under the Constitution of India, the governor is the state's de jure head, while de facto executive authority rests with the chief minister. Following elections to the Odisha Legislative Assembly, the governor invites the party or coalition with a majority of seats to form the state government. The governor appoints the chief minister, whose council of ministers is collectively responsible to the assembly. Subject to the confidence of the assembly, the chief minister's term is for five years and carries no term limits. By convention and under the rules of procedure of the house, the chief minister also serves as the Leader of the House in the Legislative Assembly.

== Elections ==
Elections to the first Vidhan Sabha (1952–57) of Odisha were held in 1951–52. The Indian National Congress won 67 seats with 37.87 percent of the vote, and Ganatantra Parishad won 31 seats and 20.50 percent of vote. Congress fell short of a simple majority, but formed a government with the support of independents; Nabakrushna Choudhury was chief minister. The Socialist Party and the Communist Party of India won 10 and 7 seats, respectively, and 24 independents were elected. Nabakrushna Choudhury resigned after the 1955 flood, and Harekrushna Mahatab returned as chief minister.

Elections to the second Vidhan Sabha (1957–62) were held in 1957. Congress won a plurality with 56 seats, and Ganatantra Parishad won 51 seats; Congress formed a government led by Harekrushna Mahatab .

The most recent election was held in 2024. Bharatiya Janata Party came to power with a majority, winning 78 of 147 seats. The BJD won 51 seats (becoming the main opposition), and the INC won 14 seats.
