= Odisha Pradesh Congress Committee =

Indian political party

Odisha Pradesh Congress(INC)
- President: Bhakta Charan Das
- Chairman: Rama Chandra Kadam
- Headquarters: Congress Bhawan, Unit-2, Bhubaneswar -751009, Odisha
- Student wing: National Students' Union of India - Odisha
- Youth wing: Odisha Youth Congress
- Women's wing: Odisha Pradesh Mahila Congress Committee
- Ideology: Populism; Social liberalism; Democratic socialism; Social democracy; Secularism
- ECI Status: A State Unit of Indian National Congress
- Seats in Rajya Sabha: 0 / 10
- Seats in Lok Sabha: 1 / 21
- Seats in Odisha Legislative Assembly: 11 / 147

Election symbol

The Odisha Pradesh Congress Committee is the unit of the Indian National Congress for the state of Odisha. It is responsible for organizing and coordinating the party's activities and campaigns within the state, as well as selecting candidates for local, state, and national elections in Odisha.

The head office of the organisation is the Congress Bhawan, situated at Master Canteen circle in Bhubaneswar.

Bhakta Charan Das was appointed president of the committee in 2025 following the 2024 general elections and currently serves as the Odisha Pradesh Congress Committee(OPCC) President.

The house and floor leader of the Odisha Pradesh Congress Committee MLA cohort is Rama Chandra Kadam (Congress Legislative Party Leader) along with deputy Congress Legislative party leader Ashok Kumar Das elected from Pottangi and Basudevpur respectively into the Seventeenth Assembly of the legislature. Currently the state unit has only one elected Member of Parliament in the Lok Sabha who is Saptagiri Sankar Ulaka having been elected twice consecutively.

The current Social Media Department of the Odisha Pradesh Congress Committee was formerly chaired by a elected tribal lawmaker Satyajeet Gomango. In its current makeup the chairperson of the social media department is educationist Dr Biswajit Mohanty who succeeded Gomango and is co-chaired by former Zilla Parishad candidate Santosh Pradhan, purviewed by a national co-coordinator of the AICC Department of Social Media & Digital Platforms & Assets Dr Sumit Dubey.

== List of district congress committee presidents ==
S. No	Name	District	Term
1.	Sunil Pradhan	Angul	2025
2.	Satya Shiba Das	Balasore	2025
3.	Hardeep Singh	Bargarh	2025
4.	Nalini Kanta Mohanty	Bhadrak	2025
5.	Prakash Chand Jena	Bhubaneshwar	2025
6.	Anil Meher	Bolangir	2025
7.	Bindhya Bini Sahu	Boudh	2025
8.	Pradipta Kumar Das	Cuttack	2025
9.	Giribala Behera	Cuttack City	2025
10.	Sem Hemram	Deogarh	2025
11.	Chabbiraj Biswal	Dhenkanal	2025
12.	Dasarathi Gomango	Gajapati	2025
13.	Rashmi Ranjan Patnaik	Ganjam East	2025
14.	Ramesh Chandra Jena	Ganjam West	2025
15.	Debaprasad Nayak	Jagatsinghpur	2025
16.	Maguni Batakrushna Jena	Jajpur	2025
17.	Jeevan Sarthak Das	Jharsuguda	2025
18.	Jalandhar Naik	Kalahandi	2025
19.	Chandra Sekhar Parida	Kandhamal	2025
20.	Debasmita Sharma	Kendrapara	2025
21.	Manoj Kumar Jena	Keonjhar	2025
22.	Rajeeb Kumar Pattanaik	Khordha	2025
23.	Rupak Turuk	Koraput	2025
24.	G. Shrinivas Rao	Malkangiri	2025
25.	Purna Chandra Biswal	Mayurbhanj East	2025
26.	Bhushan Bihari Sahu	Mayurbhanj West	2025
27.	Lipika Majhi	Nabarangpur	2025
28.	Ranajit Das	Nayagarh	2025
29.	Ghasi Ram Majhi	Nuapada	2025
30.	Rajesh Kumar Mishra	Puri	2025
31.	Appala Swamy Kadraka	Rayagada	2025
32.	Sabir Hussain	Rourkela	2025
33.	Amit Kumar Guru	Sambalpur	2025
34.	Binod Patra	Subamapur	2025
35.	Nirmal Chand Naik	Sundargarh	2025

== History ==
=== Pre-Independence 1920-1947 ===
Until 1920, there was no separate provincial committee for Odisha. Congress organisation in Odisha was under Bihar And Orissa Provincial Congress committee . The Nagpur Session of the Indian National Congress, held in December 1920, which finally passed the Non Co-operation resolution was attended by a number of delegates from Orissa such as Pandit Gopabandhu Das, Bhagirathi Mahapatra, Jagabandhu Singh, Jadumani Mangaraj, Mukunda Prasad Das, Niranjan Patnaik and Harekrushna Mahatab. This session of the Congress decided to form the Provincial Congress Committees on linguistic basis. As a result, a separate Provincial Congress Committee was formed for Orissa even though Orissa had not yet became a separate province. Soon after the Nagpur Congress session, the Utkal Union Conference was held at Chakradharpur under the Presidency of Jagabandhu Singh. In this Conference Gopabandhu Das suggested a modification in the outlook of the Utkal Union Conference.

This led to the formation Utkal Pradesh Congress Committee uniting representation of all Odia speaking tracts, consisting of British administered Madras Presidency, Central Province, Bengal Presidency and the pre 1936 Bihar and Orissa Province. With its first President being Utkalamani Gopabandhu Das the formation of Utkal Pradesh Congress Committee (UPCC) gave impetus to formation of Odisha state. This also gave boost to Congress activities in the Odia speaking areas.

The Utkal Pradesh Congress Committee deputed the following twelve members to represent Orissa at the All India Congress Committee. They were Gopabandhu Das, Jagabandhu Singh, Nilakantha Das, Gopabandhu Choudhury, Niranjan Pattanaik, Harekrushna Mahatab, Bhagirathi Mahapatra, Dharanidhar Mishra Banaprastha, Nilakantha Das Choudhury, Atal Bihari Acharya, Brajamohan Panda and Jamini Kanta Biswas.

UPCC gave boost to formation of Orissa state. In 1931 UPCC adopted a resolution moved by Harekrushna Mahatab, that urged the Government of India to establish a separate Orissa state. It also established a committee to take the matter further and cooperate with the British administration without compromising Congress principles.

== List of presidents ==
S.no	President	Portrait	Term		Duration
1.	Gopabandhu Das		1920	1928	
2.	Harekrushna Mahatab		1930	1931	
3.	Nilakantha Das		1934	1939	
4.	Banamali Patnaik		1953	1954	
5.	Binayak Acharya		1967	1972	
6.	Nilamani Routray		1972	1977	
7.	Nityananda Misra		1977	1980	
8.	Kunj Bihari Nayak		1980	1984	
9.	Hemananda Biswal		1984	1989	
10.	Sarat Pattanayak		1989	1994	
(9).	Hemananda Biswal		1994	1998	
11.	Niranjan Patnaik		1998	2000	
12.	Janaki Ballabh Patnaik		2000	2001	
13.	Giridhar Gamang		2001	2004	
(12).	Janaki Ballabh Patnaik		2004	2004	
14.	Jayadev Jena		26 June 2004	28 January 2009	4 years, 216 days
15.	Kamakhya Prasad Singh Deo		28 January 2009	7 June 2011	2 years, 130 days
(11).	Niranjan Patnaik		7 June 2011	13 May 2013	1 year, 340 days
(14).	Jayadev Jena		13 May 2013	15 December 2014	1 year, 216 days
16.	Prasad Kumar Harichandan		15 December 2014	19 April 2018	3 years, 125 days
(11).	Niranjan Patnaik		19 April 2018	23 May 2022	4 years, 34 days
(10).	Sarat Pattanayak		23 May 2022	11 February 2025	2 years, 264 days
17.	Bhakta Charan Das		11 February 2025	Incumbent	1 year, 146 days

== Electoral performance ==
=== Odisha Legislative Assembly election ===
Year	Party leader	Seats won	Change in seats	Outcome
1952	Nabakrushna Choudhury	67 / 140	New	Government
1957	Harekrushna Mahatab	56 / 140	▼11	Government
1961	Biju Patnaik	82 / 140	▲26	Government
1967	Sadashiva Tripathy	31 / 140	▼6	Opposition
1971	Nandini Satpathy	51 / 140	▲20	Opposition
1974	Nandini Satpathy	69 / 140	▲18	Government
1977	Binayak Acharya	26 / 140	▼25	Opposition
1980	Janaki Ballabh Patnaik	118 / 147	▲87	Government
1985	Janaki Ballabh Patnaik	117 / 147	▼1	Government
1990	Hemananda Biswal	10 / 147	▼107	Opposition
1995	Janaki Ballabh Patnaik	80 / 147	▲70	Government
2000	Hemananda Biswal	26 / 147	▼54	Opposition
2004	Narasingha Mishra	38 / 147	▲12	Opposition
2009	Bhupinder Singh	27 / 147	▼11	Opposition
2014	Jayadev Jena	16 / 147	▼11	Opposition
2019	Niranjan Patnaik	9 / 147	▼7	Opposition
2024	Sarat Pattanayak	14 / 147	▲5	Opposition

=== Lok Sabha elections ===
Lok Sabha Elections
Year	Lok Sabha	Seats contested	Seats won	(+/-) in seats	% of votes	Vote swing	Popular vote	Outcome
1951	1st	18	11 / 20	New entry	42.51%	New entry	15,55,787	Government
1957	2nd	20	7 / 20	▼4	40.01%	▼2.50	17,76,767	Government
1962	3rd	20	14 / 20	▲7	55.53%	▲15.52	10,93,297	Government
1967	4th	20	6 / 20	▼8	33.33%	▼22.20	13,53,704	Government
1971	5th	19	15 / 20	▲9	38.46%	▲5.13	17,16,021	Government
1977	6th	20	4 / 21	▼11	38.18%	▼0.28	20,59,490	Opposition
1980	7th	21	20 / 21	▲16	56.07%	▲17.89	34,51,255	Government
1984	8th	21	20 / 21	Steady	57.46%	▲1.39	46,92,933	Government
1989	9th	21	3 / 21	▼17	38.41%	▼19.05	42,98,516	Opposition
1991	10th	21	13 / 21	▲10	44.05%	▲5.64	45,98,809	Government
1996	11th	21	16 / 21	▲3	44.90%	▲0.85	58,50,025	Opposition
1998	12th	21	5 / 21	▼11	41.04%	▼3.86	54,77,410	Opposition
1999	13th	20	2 / 21	▼3	36.94%	▼4.10	49,01,186	Opposition
2004	14th	21	2 / 21	Steady	40.43%	▲3.49	68,45,738	Government
2009	15th	21	6 / 21	▲4	32.75%	▼7.68	58,16,904	Government
2014	16th	21	0 / 21	▼4	25.97%	▼6.78	55,91,380	Opposition
2019	17th	18	1 / 21	▲1	13.99%	▼11.98	32,85,339	Opposition
2024	18th	20	1 / 21	Steady	12.52%	▼1.47	31,30,056	Opposition

== Political affairs committee ==
No	Name
1.	Ajay Kumar Lallu
2.	Bhakta Charan Das
3.	Rama Chandra Kadam
4.	Saptagiri Ulaka
5.	Niranjan Patnaik
6	Jayadev Jena
7.	Sarat Pattanayak
8.	Prasad Harichandan
9.	Srikant Jena
10.	Nagendra Pradhan
11.	Jaganath Patnaik
12.	Amar Chandra Pradhan
13.	Sushila Tiriya
14.	A. P. Sethi
15.	Ramachandra Khuntia
16.	Sarat Raut
17.	Assaf Ali Khan
18.	Tara Prasad Bahinipati
19.	Ramesh Jena
20.	C. S. Raazen Ekka
21.	Debashish Patnaik
22.	Santosh Singh Saluja
23.	Biswaranjan Mohanty
24.	Sasmita Behera

== See also ==
- Indian National Congress
- Congress Working Committee
- All India Congress Committee
- Pradesh Congress Committee
