= Gunupur Assembly constituency =

Constituency of the Odisha legislative assembly in India

Coordinates: 19.07°N 83.81°E

Gunupur
- Constituency No. 138 for the Odisha Legislative Assembly
- Gunupur Assembly constituency in Rayagada district

Constituency details
- Country: India
- Region: East India
- State: Odisha
- Division: Southern Division
- District: Rayagada
- Lok Sabha constituency: Koraput
- Established: 1951
- Total electors: 2,24,055 (Note: as on 2024) (Note: as data published by election commission)
- Reservation: ST

Member of Legislative Assembly
- 17th Odisha Legislative Assembly
- Incumbent Satyajeet Gomango
- Party: Indian National Congress
- Elected year: 2024

Gunupur is a Vidhan Sabha constituency of Rayagada district, Odisha.

Map of Gunupur Constituency

This constituency includes Gunupur, Gudari, Gunupur block, Ramanaguda block, Padmapur block, Chandrapur block and Gudari block.

== Members of Legislative Assembly ==
Vote share of winning candidates
2024	47.80%
2019	34.2%
2014	41.6%
2009	38.62%
2004	41.45%
2000	62.08%
1996 (bypoll)	32.86%
1995	59.28%
1990	56.04%
1985	80.57%
1980	56.19%
1977	60.45%

Since its formation in 1951, 19 elections were held till date including in two bypoll in 1955 & 1996. It was a 2 member constituency for 1952 & 1957.

List of members elected from Gunupur constituency are:

Year	Member	Party
2024	Satyajeet Gomango	Indian National Congress
2019	Raghunath Gomango	Biju Janata Dal
2014	Trinath Gomango	Biju Janata Dal
2009	Ramamurty Mutika	Biju Janata Dal
2004	Hema Gamang	Indian National Congress
2000	Rammurty Gomango	Bharatiya Janata Party
1996 (bypoll) (Note: Death of Akshya Kumar Gomango)	Bhagirathi Gomango	Independent politician
1995	Akshya Kumar Gomango	Indian National Congress
1990	Rammurty Gomango	Janata Dal
1985	Bhagirathi Gomango	Indian National Congress
1980	Bhagirathi Gomango	Indian National Congress (I)
1977	Bhagirathi Gomango	Indian National Congress
1974	Bhagirathi Gomango	Indian National Congress
1971	Bhagirathi Gomango	Indian National Congress (R)
1967	Bhagirathi Gomango	Indian National Congress
1961	Naroshimho Patro	Indian National Congress
1957 (Note: It was a 2 member constituency)	Sanyasi Charan Pidikaka	Independent politician
1957	Naroshimho Patro	Indian National Congress
1955 (bypoll) (Note: Resignation of Soboro Dumba)	Bhagirathi Gomango	Ganatantra Parishad
1951	Soboro Dumba	Ganatantra Parishad

== Election Results ==
=== 2024 ===
Voting were held on 13th May 2024 in 1st phase of Odisha Assembly Election & 4th phase of Indian General Election. Counting of votes was on 4th June 2024. In 2024 election, Indian National Congress candidate Satyajeet Gomango defeated Biju Janata Dal candidate Raghunath Gomango by a margin of 29,885 votes.

2024 Odisha Vidhan Sabha Election: Gunupur
Party	Candidate	Votes	%	±%
INC	Satyajeet Gomango	77,637	47.80	▲17.99
BJD	Raghunath Gomango	47,752	29.40	▼4.80
BJP	Trinath Gomango	21,808	13.43	▲1.88
NOTA	None of the above	3,205	1.97	▼1.3
Majority		29,885	18.40	▲14.01
Turnout		1,62,410	72.49	▲1.95
INC gain from BJD				

=== 2019 ===
In 2019 election, Biju Janata Dal candidate Raghunath Gomango defeated Indian National Congress candidate Purusottam Gomango by a margin of 6,270 votes.

2019 Odisha Vidhan Sabha Election: Gunupur
Party	Candidate	Votes	%	±%
BJD	Raghunath Gomango	48,839	34.20	
INC	Purusottam Gomango	42,569	29.81	
Independent	Trinath Gomango	26,321	18.43	
BJP	Shishir Kumar Gamang	16,491	11.55	
NOTA	None of the above	4,671	3.27	
Majority		6,270	4.39	
Turnout		1,48,499	70.54	
BJD hold				

=== 2014 ===
In 2014 election, Biju Janata Dal candidate Trinath Gomango defeated Indian National Congress candidate Purusattam Gomango by a margin of 8,286 votes.

2014 Odisha Vidhan Sabha Election: Gunupur
Party	Candidate	Votes	%	±%
BJD	Trinath Gomango	59,527	41.6	▲2.98
INC	Purusattam Gomango	52,141	36.44	▲15.19
BJP	Ramurty Gomango	15,596	10.9	▲0.63
NOTA	None of the above	2,877	2.01	−
Majority		7,386	5.16	−
Turnout		1,43,079	74.17	▲13.26
Registered electors		1,92,905		
BJD hold				

=== 2009 ===
In 2009 election, Biju Janata Dal candidate Ramamurty Mutika defeated Indian National Congress candidate Sisir Kumar Gamang by a margin of 18,749 votes.

2009 Odisha Vidhan Sabha Election: Gunupur
Party	Candidate	Votes	%	±%
BJD	Ramamurty Mutika	41,687	38.62	−
INC	Sisir Kumar Gamang	22,938	21.25	−
CPI(ML)L	Tripati Gomango	12,890	11.94	−
BJP	Aswini Gomango	12,441	11.53	−
Independent	Bhagirathi Gomango	5,979	5.54	−
Majority		18,749	17.37 (Note: %of total valid votes)	−
Turnout		1,08,841	60.91 (Note: 2004 Voter turnout was 59.74%)	▲1.17
BJD gain from INC				
