= Laxmipur Assembly constituency =

Constituency of the Odisha legislative assembly in India

Coordinates: 18.99°N 83.12°E

Lakshmipur
- Constituency No. 141 for the Odisha Legislative Assembly

Constituency details
- Country: India
- Region: East India
- State: Odisha
- Division: Southern Division
- District: Koraput
- Lok Sabha constituency: Koraput
- Established: 1974
- Total electors: 1,73,780 (Note: as on 2024) (Note: as data published by election commission)
- Reservation: ST

Member of Legislative Assembly
- 17th Odisha Legislative Assembly
- Incumbent Pabitra Saunta
- Party: Indian National Congress
- Elected year: 2024

Lakshmipur is a Vidhan Sabha constituency of Koraput district, Odisha.

Map of Lakshmipur Constituency

This constituency includes Laxmipur block, Dasamanthapur block, Bandhugaob block and Narayanpatana block.

== Elected members ==
Vote share of winning candidates
2024	41.77%
2019	34.02%
2014	46.1%
2009	32.47%
2008 (bypoll)	41.11%
2004	46.66%
2000	50.85%
1995	68.17%
1990	49.91%
1985	61.51%
1980	66.94%
1977	52.11%

Since its formation in 1974, 14 elections were held till date including in two bypoll in 1999 & 2008 .

List of members elected from Laxmipur constituency are:

Year	Member	Party
2024	Pabitra Saunta	Indian National Congress
2019	Prabhu Jani	Biju Janata Dal
2014	Kailash Chandra Kulesika	Indian National Congress
2009	Jhina Hikaka	Biju Janata Dal
2008 (bypoll) (Note: Death of Anantaram Majhi)	Purna Chandra Majhi	Indian National Congress
2004	Anantaram Majhi	Indian National Congress
2000	Bibhisana Majhi	Biju Janata Dal
1999 (bypoll) (Note: Resignation of Anantaram Majhi)	Giridhar Gamang	Indian National Congress
1995	Anantaram Majhi	Indian National Congress
1990	Akhilo Saunta	Janata Dal
1985	Anantaram Majhi	Indian National Congress
1980	Anantaram Majhi	Indian National Congress (I)
1977	Akhilo Saunta	Janata Party
1974	Anantaram Majhi	Indian National Congress

== Election results ==
=== 2024 ===
Voting were held on 13 May 2024 in 1st phase of Odisha Assembly Election & 4th phase of Indian General Election. Counting of votes was on 4 June 2024. In 2024 election, Indian National Congress candidate Pabitra Saunta defeated Biju Janata Dal candidate Prabhu Jani by a margin of 21,262 votes.

2024 Odisha Vidhan Sabha Election: Lakshmipur
Party	Candidate	Votes	%	±%
INC	Pabitra Saunta	59,447	41.77	▲7.92
BJD	Prabhu Jani	38,185	26.83	▼7.19
BJP	Kailash Chandra Kulesika	23,505	16.52	▲2.26
NOTA	None of the above	5633	3.96	▼1.36
Majority		21,262	14.94	▲14.74
Turnout		1,42,303	81.89	▲5.43
INC gain from BJD				

=== 2019 ===
In 2019 election, Biju Janata Dal candidate Prabhu Jani defeated Indian National Congress candidate Kailash Chandra Kulesika by a margin of 229 votes.

2019 Odisha Vidhan Sabha Election: Lakshmipur
Party	Candidate	Votes	%	±%
BJD	Prabhu Jani	45,211	34.02	−
INC	Kailash Chandra Kulesika	44,982	33.85	−
BJP	Kumuda Chandra Saunta	18,945	14.26	−
NOTA	None of the above	7,026	5.29	−
Majority		229	0.17	−
Turnout		1,32,878	76.46	−
BJD gain from INC				

=== 2014 ===
In 2019 election, Indian National Congress candidate Kailash Chandra Kulesika defeated Biju Janata Dal candidate Hema Gamang by a margin of 22,473 votes.

2014 Odisha Vidhan Sabha Election: Lakshmipur
Party	Candidate	Votes	%	±%
INC	Kailash Chandra Kulesika	53,429	46.1	−
BJD	Hema Gamang	30,956	26.7	−
BJP	Shiba Muduli	9,527	8.2	−
NOTA	None of the above	4,069	2.69	−
Majority		22,473	18.7	−
Turnout		1,19,949	77.33	−
INC gain from BJD				

=== 2009 ===
In 2009 election, Biju Janata Dal candidate Jhina Hikaka defeated Indian National Congress candidate Hema Gamang by a margin of 3,406 votes.

2009 Odisha Vidhan Sabha Election: Lakshmipur
Party	Candidate	Votes	%	±%
BJD	Jhina Hikaka	25,095	32.47	−
INC	Hema Gamang	21,689	28.06	−
Independent	Kailash Chandra Kulesika	7,577	9.80	−
BSP	Gupteswar Jani	5,267	6.82	−
BJP	Gopinath Kadatasia	5,078	6.57	−
Majority		3,406	4.41 (Note: % of total valid votes)	−
Turnout		77,290	53.52	−
BJD gain from INC		Swing	10.54 (Note: 2004 Voter turnout was 64.06%)	
