= Giridhar Gamang =

Indian politician

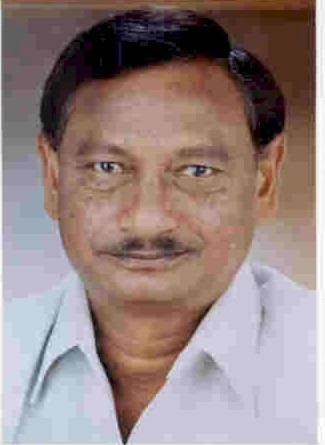

13th Chief Minister of Odisha
- In office 17 February 1999 – 6 December 1999
- Preceded by: Janaki Ballabh Patnaik
- Succeeded by: Hemananda Biswal

Member of Parliament, Lok Sabha
- In office 13 May 2004 – 16 May 2009
- Preceded by: Hema Gamang
- Succeeded by: Jayaram Pangi
- Constituency: Koraput
- In office 1972 – 6 October 1999
- Preceded by: Bhagirathi Gamang
- Succeeded by: Hema Gamang
- Constituency: Koraput

President Odisha Pradesh Congress Committee
- In office 1990–1992

Member Of Odisha Legislative Assembly
- In office 1999–2000
- Preceded by: Anantaram Majhi
- Succeeded by: Bibhisana Majhi
- Constituency: Laxmipur

Personal details
- Born: 8 April 1943 (age 83) Dibirisingi, Orissa, British India
- Party: Indian National Congress
- Other political affiliations: Bharat Rashtra Samithi; Bharatiya Janata Party
- Spouse: Hema Gamang
- Children: Shishir Gamang; Samir Gamang
- As of 22 June, 2013

Giridhar Gamang (born 8 April 1943) is an Indian politician who is a leader in the Indian National Congress and a former Chief Minister of Odisha. He was born at Dibirisingi village in Rayagada district of Odisha. In 1972, he was elected for the first time to the 5th Lok Sabha from Koraput. Subsequently, he was re-elected to the Lok Sabha in 1977, 1980, 1984, 1989, 1991, 1996, 1998 and 2004. He was the Chief Minister of Odisha from 17 February 1999 to 6 December 1999.

His wife, Hema Gamang, won from Koraput constituency in the 1999 elections to the 13th Lok Sabha, while he was serving as the Chief Minister of Odisha.

In 1998, while he was a member of the 12th parliament, he was asked to become Chief minister of Odisha. Two months later, there was a vote-of-confidence against the BJP government and Giridhar still went to the parliament to vote against the government as he was from congress (despite the fact that he had to quit either being CM or the MP office and become MLA, within six months). The government lost power by one vote (269–270) and it is widely believed that if Giridhar had abstained, the speaker, G. M. C. Balayogi would have used his vote to save the government in case of tie. The fall of government resulted in another fresh general election in May 1999.

He lost the Koraput seat for the first time in the 2009 elections to Jayaram Pangi of the Biju Janata Dal.

He had briefly joined the Bharatiya Janata Party in 2015, was thought to be their potential Chief Ministerial candidate before being disregarded from consideration by the party. He quit Bharatiya Janata Party and joined Bharat Rashtra Samithi in 2023.

== Elections Contested ==
=== Lok Sabha ===
Year	Constituency	Party	Votes	%	Opponent	Opponent Party	Opponent Votes	%	Result	Margin	%
2014	Koraput	INC	375,781	37.98	Jhina Hikaka	BJD	395,109	39.93	Lost	-19,328	-1.95
2009	Koraput	INC	216,416	28.37	Jayaram Pangi	BJD	312,776	41	Lost	-96,360	-12.63
2004	Koraput	INC	334,746	45.5	Papanna Mutika	BJD	291,481	39.62	Won	43,265	5.88
1998	Koraput	INC	267,425	53.92	Jayaram Pangi	BJD	185,909	37.48	Won	81,516	16.44
1996	Koraput	INC	301,241	57.59	Jayaram Pangi	JD	163,588	31.27	Won	137,653	26.32
1991	Koraput	INC	234,501	66.14	Jayaram Pangi	JD	92,907	26.21	Won	141,594	39.93
1989	Koraput	INC	200,126	56.41	Jayaram Pangi	JD	154,673	43.59	Won	45,453	12.82
1984	Koraput	INC	154,713	68.52	Labanyo Saboro	JP	54,891	24.31	Won	99,822	44.21
1980	Koraput	INC(I)	97,194	64.6	Jayaram Pangi	JP(S)	32,876	21.85	Won	64,318	42.75
1977	Koraput	INC	78,494	55.06	Papanna Mutika	BLD	64,065	44.94	Won	14,429	10.12
1972	Koraput (by-election)	INC	72,306	60.87	B. Mallana	SWA	46,479	39.12	Won	25,827	21.75

Preceded by Janaki Ballabh Patnaik	Chief Minister of Odisha; 17 February 1999 – 6 December 1999	Succeeded by Hemananda Biswal
