= 2004 Orissa Legislative Assembly election =

Assembly elections in Odisha, India

- 20 & 26 April 2004

All 147 seats in the Orissa Legislative Assembly 74 seats needed for a majority
- Registered: 2,56,51,989 (▲6.06%)
- Turnout: 66.05% (▲6.95pp)
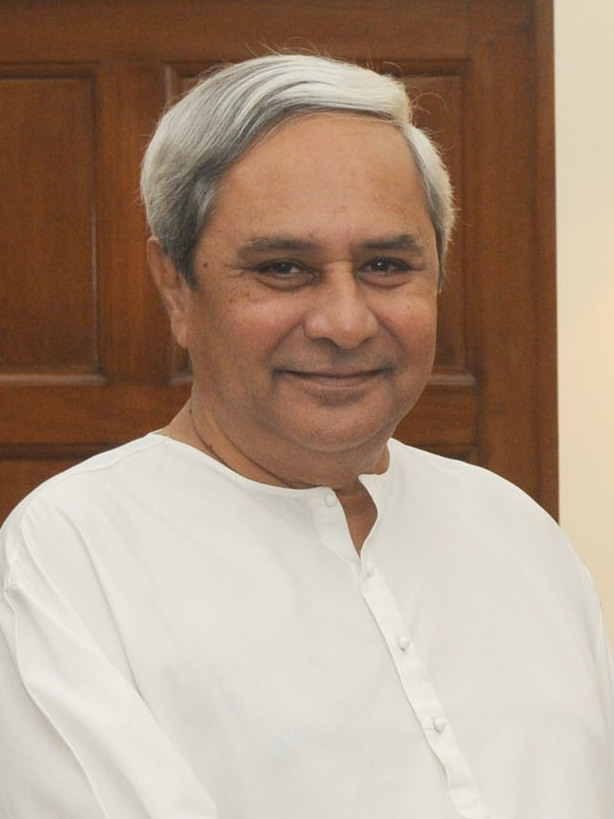

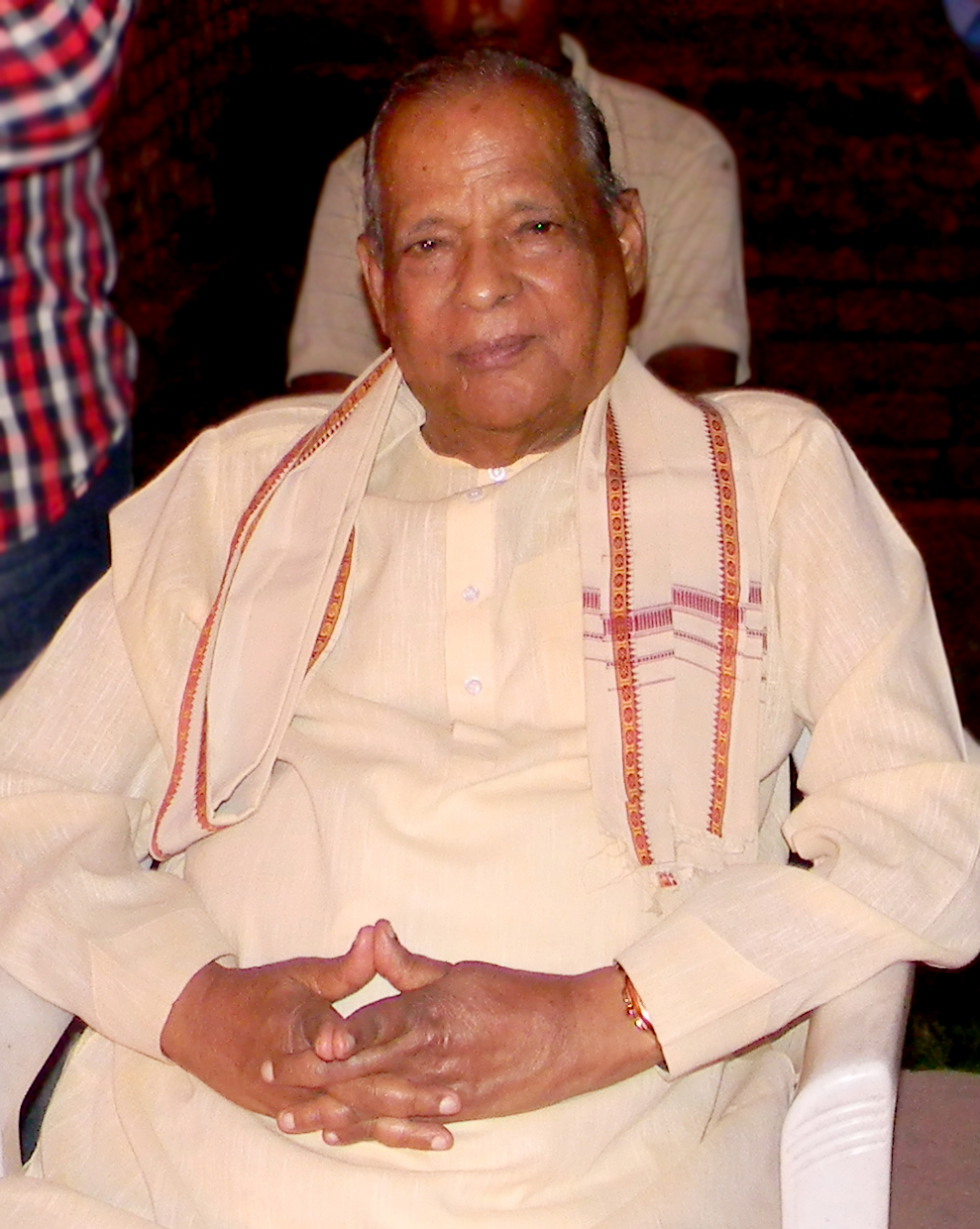
	Majority party	Minority party	Third party
Leader	Naveen Patnaik		Janaki Ballabh Patnaik
Party	BJD	BJP	INC
Alliance	NDA	NDA	UPA
Leader's seat	Hinjili		Begunia
Seats before	74	48	9
Seats won	61	32	38
Seat change	▼14	▼16	▲29
Popular vote	27.36%	17.11	34.82%
CM before election
Naveen Patnaik
Biju Janata Dal (NDA)
Elected CM
Naveen Patnaik
Biju Janata Dal (NDA)

Elections to the Orissa Legislative Assembly were held in April 2004 to elect members of the 147 constituencies in Orissa, India. The Bhartiya Janata Party and Biju Janata Dal fought election together as NDA. The National Democratic Alliance won the most seats and Naveen Patnaik was re-appointed as the Chief Minister of Orissa. The opposition Congress was headed by former CM Janaki Ballabh Pattnaik, who was unsuccessful. The number of constituencies was set as 147 by the recommendation of the Delimitation Commission of India.

== Schedule ==
The schedule of the election was announced by the Election Commission of India on 29 February 2004.

Poll event	Phase	
Poll event	1	2
Date of announcement	29 February 2004	
Notification date	24 March 2004	31 March 2004
Last date for filing nomination	31 March 2004	7 April 2004
Scrutiny of nomination	2 April 2004	8 April 2004
Last date for withdrawal of nomination	5 April 2004	10 April 2004
Date of poll	20 April 2004	26 April 2004
Date of counting of votes	13 May 2004	
No. of constituencies	77	70

== Parties and alliances ==
=== National Democratic Alliance ===
Seats where divided in 4:3 ratio.

Party	Flag	Symbol	Leader	Contesting Seats
Biju Janata Dal			Naveen Patnaik	84
Bharatiya Janata Party			Jual Oram	63

=== United Progressive Alliance ===
Party	Flag	Symbol	Leader	Contesting Seats
Indian National Congress			Janaki Ballabh Patnaik	133
Jharkhand Mukti Morcha			Shibu Soren	12
Odisha Gana Parishad	-	-	Bijoy Mohapatra	4

== Result ==
Source: Election Commission of India
Party		Popular vote			Seats		
Name	Symbol	Votes	%	±pp	Contested	Won	+/−
Indian National Congress		5,896,713	34.82	▲1.04	133	38	▲12
Biju Janata Dal		4,632,280	27.36	▼2.04	84	61	▼7
Bharatiya Janata Party		2,898,105	17.11	▼1.09	63	32	▼6
Jharkhand Mukti Morcha		301,777	1.78	▼0.36	12	4	▲1
Odisha Gana Parishad	-	217,998	1.20	(new)	4	2	(new)
Communist Party of India		129,989	0.77	▼0.45	6	1	Steady
Communist Party of India (Marxist)		93,159	0.55	▼0.22	3	1	Steady
Independents	-	2,065,650	12.20	▲1.54	295	8	Steady
Total		-	100	-	-	147	-
Valid Votes		16,933,456	66.01				
Invalid Votes		9,461	-				
Total Votes polled / turnout		16,942,917	66.05				
Abstentation		8,709,072	-				
Total No. of Electors		25,651,989					

=== Results by district ===
District	Seats	BJD	BJP	INC	OTH
Angul	5	3	1	1	0
Balangir	6	3	1	1	1
Balasore	7	2	2	2	1
Bargarh	5	1	2	2	0
Bhadrak	5	1	1	3	0
Boudh	1	1	0	0	0
Cuttack	10	6	1	2	1
Deogarh	1	0	0	1	0
Dhenkanal	3	2	0	1	0
Gajapati	3	1	1	1	0
Ganjam	12	8	1	1	2
Jagatsinghpur	4	2	0	2	0
Jajpur	7	5	1	1	0
Jharsuguda	3	1	1	1	0
Kalahandi	6	3	3	0	0
Kandhamal	3	1	1	1	0
Kendrapara	5	3	0	1	1
Keonjhar	6	1	2	3	0
Khurda	6	3	2	1	0
Koraput	5	2	0	3	0
Malkangiri	2	0	1	1	0
Mayurbhanj	10	2	5	0	3
Nawapara	2	1	0	0	1
Nayagarh	4	1	1	0	2
Nowrangpur	4	1	1	2	0
Puri	6	3	1	1	1
Rayagada	3	0	0	3	0
Sambalpur	3	1	2	0	0
Subarnapur	3	2	0	1	0
Sundergarh	7	1	1	2	3
Total	147	61	32	38	16

== Elected members ==
District	Constituency		Winner				Runner Up				Margin	%
District	#	Name (Note: SC and ST indicate constituencies reserved for Scheduled Castes and Scheduled Tribes respectively.)	Candidate	Party	Votes	%	Candidate	Party	Votes	%	Margin	%
Mayurbhanj	1	Karanjia (ST)	Ajit Hembram	BJD	38,405	41.02	Padma Haiburu	INC	29,149	31.14	9,256	9.88
Mayurbhanj	2	Jashipur (ST)	Sambhunath Naik	IND	22,831	25.92	Mangal Singh Mudi	BJP	17,529	19.90	5,302	6.02
Mayurbhanj	3	Bahalda (ST)	Prahlad Purty	JMM	20,041	25.11	Khelaram Mahali	BJP	19,216	24.07	825	1.04
Mayurbhanj	4	Rairangpur (ST)	Droupadi Murmu	BJP	29,295	32.66	Ram Chandra Murmu	JMM	29,253	32.62	42	0.04
Mayurbhanj	5	Bangriposi (ST)	Chaitanya Majhi	BJD	22,581	22.46	Ajen Murmu	JMM	17,156	17.06	5,425	5.40
Mayurbhanj	6	Kuliana (ST)	Sananda Marndi	BJP	44,775	40.71	Sudam Marndi	JMM	41,020	37.30	3,755	3.41
Mayurbhanj	7	Baripada	Bimal Lochan Das	JMM	44,463	35.26	Raj Kishore Dash	BJP	30,397	24.10	14,066	11.16
Mayurbhanj	8	Baisinga (ST)	Pramila Giri	BJP	37,382	34.59	Biram Majhi	IND	35,220	32.59	2,162	2.00
Mayurbhanj	9	Khunta (ST)	Golak Bihari Naik	BJP	44,333	41.37	Surendra Nath Majhi	INC	34,362	32.06	9,971	9.31
Mayurbhanj	10	Udala (ST)	Bhaskar Madhei	BJP	32,755	32.33	Ananga Senapati	INC	26,839	26.49	5,916	5.84
Balasore	11	Bhograi	Ananta Das	BJD	57,589	41.03	Kartikeswar Patra	IND	55,909	39.83	1,680	1.20
Balasore	12	Jaleswar	Aswini Kumar Patra	BJP	84,930	51.61	Jayanarayan Mohanty	INC	76,002	46.18	8,928	5.43
Balasore	13	Basta	Raghunath Mohanty	BJD	76,316	55.83	Sanjiv Giri	INC	40,206	29.41	36,110	26.42
Balasore	14	Balasore	Arun Dey	OGP	73,291	47.36	Jiban Pradip Dash	BJP	72,706	46.98	585	0.38
Balasore	15	Soro	Kartik Mahapatra	INC	66,517	48.95	Birendra Mohan Biswal	BJP	65,659	48.31	858	0.64
Balasore	16	Simulia	Padma Lochan	INC	65,905	50.28	Parsuram Panigrahi	BJD	62,065	47.35	3,840	2.93
Balasore	17	Nilgiri	Pratap Sarangi	BJP	65,530	48.49	Pradipta Panda	CPM	46,778	34.61	18,752	13.88
Bhadrak	18	Bhandari; Pokhari (SC)	Ananta Sethi	INC	61,221	49.33	Ratha Das	BJD	59,675	48.09	1,546	1.24
Bhadrak	19	Bhadrak	Naren Pallai	INC	66,016	50.57	Prafulla Samal	BJD	61,204	46.88	4,812	3.69
Bhadrak	20	Dhamnagar	Manmohan Samal	BJP	63,557	48.55	Jagannatha Rout	INC	34,615	26.44	28,942	22.11
Bhadrak	21	Chandbali (SC)	Netrananda Mallick	INC	54,474	39.86	Bishnu Charan Sethi	BJP	52,999	38.78	1,475	1.08
Bhadrak	22	Basudevpur	Bijayshree Routray	BJD	72,983	51.01	Madhabananda Mallick	INC	67,091	46.89	5,892	4.12
Jajpur	23	Sukinda	Prafulla C. Ghadai	BJD	72,474	51.17	Sarat Rout	INC	65,598	46.31	6,876	4.86
Jajpur	24	Korai	Sanchita Mohanty	BJP	67,888	55.18	Ashok Kumar Das	JDS	48,709	39.59	19,179	15.59
Jajpur	25	Jajpur (SC)	Parameswar Sethi	BJD	64,480	55.25	Anchal Das	INC	49,310	42.25	15,170	13.00
Jajpur	26	Dharamsala	Kalpataru Das	BJD	71,819	56.65	Kangali Charan Panda	INC	52,559	41.46	19,260	15.19
Jajpur	27	Barchana	Sitakanta Mohapatra	INC	72,797	50.79	Goutam Ray	BJD	68,109	47.52	4,688	3.27
Jajpur	28	Bari-Derabisi	Debasis Nayak	BJD	60,997	53.00	Kulamani Rout	INC	51,181	44.48	9,816	8.52
Jajpur	29	Binjharpur (SC)	Pramila Mallik	BJD	60,678	55.44	Ashok Das	INC	43,409	39.66	17,269	15.78
Kendrapara	30	Aul	Pratap Keshari Deb	BJD	61,869	53.08	Debendra Sharma	INC	52,637	45.16	9,232	7.92
Kendrapara	31	Patamundai (SC)	Kishor Chandra Tarai	BJD	65,000	56.53	Ganeswar Behera	INC	49,981	43.47	15,019	13.06
Kendrapara	32	Rajnagar	Nalinikanta Mohanty	INC	69,856	52.11	Krutibash Patra	BJD	61,411	45.81	8,445	6.30
Kendrapara	33	Kendrapara	Utkal Keshari Parida	OGP	60,848	50.96	Bedprakash Agrawalla	BJP	56,283	47.14	4,565	3.82
Kendrapara	34	Patkura	Atanu Nayak	BJD	62,769	49.57	Bijoy Mohapatra	OGP	59,914	47.31	2,855	2.26
Jagatsinghpur	35	Tirtol	Chiranjib Biswal	INC	69,268	50.50	Debashish Samantaray	BJD	65,254	47.57	4,014	2.93
Jagatsinghpur	36	Ersama	Dr. Damodar Rout	BJD	79,590	52.42	Ramesh Samantaray	INC	59,285	39.05	20,305	13.37
Jagatsinghpur	37	Balikuda	Umesh Chandra Swain	INC	48,242	42.76	Raghunandan Das	IND	39,520	35.03	8,722	7.73
Jagatsinghpur	38	Jagat; Singhpur (SC)	Bishnu Charan Das	BJD	64,284	51.72	Lakshman Mallick	INC	57,028	45.88	7,256	5.84
Cuttack	39	Kissannagar	Pratap Jena	BJD	68,044	59.54	Gurupada Nanda	INC	43,276	37.87	24,768	21.67
Cuttack	40	Mahanga	Bikram Keshari Barma	BJD	58,738	53.42	Sk Matlub Ali	INC	49,878	45.36	8,860	8.06
Cuttack	41	Salepur (SC)	Kalindi Behera	BJD	57,248	52.96	Prakash Behera	INC	48,502	44.87	8,746	8.09
Cuttack	42	Gobindpur	Rabindra Kumar Mallick	INC	66,248	50.65	Panchanan Kanungo	BJD	61,958	47.37	4,290	3.28
Cuttack	43	Cuttack Sadar	Pravat Ranjan Biswal	IND	60,822	46.25	Nayan Kishore Mohanty	BJP	47,113	35.83	13,709	10.42
Cuttack	44	Cuttack City	Samir Dey	BJP	58,908	52.73	Suresh Mohapatra	INC	48,749	43.63	10,159	9.10
Cuttack	45	Choudwar	Dharmananda Behera	BJD	60,185	57.39	Kanhu Charan Lenka	INC	30,391	28.98	29,794	28.41
Cuttack	46	Banki	Debasis Pattnaik	INC	58,106	49.38	Pravat Tripathy	BJD	56,939	48.39	1,167	0.99
Cuttack	47	Athgarh	Ranendra Pratap Swain	BJD	70,720	52.40	Bichitra Nanda Muduli	IND	32,068	23.76	38,652	28.64
Cuttack	48	Baramba	Debiprasad Mishra	BJD	70,441	62.63	Manoranjan Nayak	INC	36,806	32.73	33,635	29.90
Khurda	49	Balipatna (SC)	Sashi Bhusan Behera	BJD	54,293	49.33	Benudhar Bhoi	INC	41,688	37.88	12,605	11.45
Khurda	50	Bhubaneswar	Biswabhusan]	BJP	1,23,671	69.24	Sarat Kumar Kar	INC	37,774	21.15	85,897	48.09
Khurda	51	Jatni	Sarat Patkaray	BJD	61,608	49.59	Suresh Kumar Routray	INC	57,578	46.34	4,030	3.25
Puri	52	Pipli	Pradeep Maharathy	BJD	65,039	52.08	Judhistir Samantaray	INC	54,427	43.58	10,612	8.50
Puri	53	Nimapara (SC)	Baidhar Mallick	BJP	61,421	45.51	Rabindra Kumar Sethy	INC	37,179	27.54	24,242	17.97
Puri	54	Kakatpur	Surendra Nath Naik	BJD	61,858	46.31	Satyabrat Patra	IND	46,833	35.07	15,025	11.24
Puri	55	Satyabadi	Ramaranjan Baliarsingh	IND	52,201	42.51	Prasad Harichandan	INC	48,807	39.74	3,394	2.77
Puri	56	Puri	Maheswar Mohanty	BJD	70,809	53.61	Uma Ballav Rath	INC	54,387	41.17	16,422	12.44
Puri	57	Brahmagiri	Lalatendu Mohapatra	INC	70,493	50.01	Sanjay Das Burma	BJD	65,213	46.27	5,280	3.74
Khurda	58	Chilka	Bibhuti B. Harichandan	BJP	72,545	52.81	Debendra Mansingh	INC	60,916	44.34	11,629	8.47
Khurda	59	Khurda	Jyotirindra Nath Mitra	BJD	59,801	49.70	Dillip Srichandan	INC	53,580	44.53	6,221	5.17
Khurda	60	Begunia	Janaki Ballav Patnaik	INC	59,658	47.41	Prasant Jagadev	BJD	57,657	45.82	2,001	1.59
Nayagarh	61	Ranpur	Surama Padhy	BJP	58,259	48.13	Ramakanta Mishra	INC	54,190	44.77	4,069	3.36
Nayagarh	62	Nayagarh	Arun Kumar Sahoo	BJD	52,414	49.24	Sitakanta Mishra	INC	49,829	46.81	2,585	2.43
Nayagarh	63	Khandapara	Bijayalaxmi Pattnaik	IND	30,997	31.30	Banamali Dash	BJD	26,524	26.78	4,473	4.52
Nayagarh	64	Daspalla	Rudra Madhab Ray	IND	33,849	34.20	Sukanta Panigrahi	BJP	28,840	29.14	5,009	5.06
Ganjam	65	Jaganath; Prasad (SC)	Madhaba Nanda Behera	BJD	57,489	62.55	Kabiraj Behera	INC	34,418	37.45	23,071	25.10
Ganjam	66	Bhanjanagar	Bikram Keshari Arukha	BJD	52,697	52.71	B. Dand Pani Patro	INC	47,271	47.29	5,426	5.42
Ganjam	67	Suruda	Kishore Singh Deo	BJP	54,510	56.94	Somanath Rath	INC	27,815	29.05	26,695	27.89
Ganjam	68	Aska	Saroj Kumar Padhy	IND	24,761	30.49	Prasanta Swain	INC	23,416	28.83	1,345	1.66
Ganjam	69	Kabisuryanagar	Ladu Kishore Swain	BJD	54,673	51.22	Nityananda Pradhan	CPI	40,757	38.18	13,916	13.04
Ganjam	70	Kodala	Niranjan Pradhan	BJD	61,029	55.91	Kumudini Patnaik	INC	41,017	37.57	20,012	18.34
Ganjam	71	Khallikote	V. Sugnana Deo	BJD	63,351	57.58	Kishor Pallai	INC	43,150	39.22	20,201	18.36
Ganjam	72	Chatrapur	Nagireddy N. Reddy	CPI	58,162	52.56	Rama Chandra Panda	BJP	45,624	41.23	12,538	11.33
Ganjam	73	Hinjili	Naveen Patnaik	BJD	62,968	72.72	Udayanath Nayak	INC	20,326	23.47	42,642	49.25
Ganjam	74	Gopalpur (SC)	Dr. Trinath Behera	INC	52,646	53.55	Gopal K. Behera	BJD	40,018	40.71	12,628	12.84
Ganjam	75	Berhampur	Ramesh C. Patnaik	BJD	48,281	42.32	Bikram Kumar Panda	INC	45,626	39.99	2,655	2.33
Ganjam	76	Chikiti	Usha Devi	BJD	54,953	49.85	Chintamani Samantra	INC	49,580	44.97	5,373	4.88
Gajapati	77	Mohana	Srujya Narayan Patro	BJD	52,632	47.60	Udaya Narayan Dev	INC	51,702	46.75	930	0.85
Gajapati	78	Ramagiri (ST)	Bharat Paik	BJP	33,542	37.41	Haladhara Karji	INC	26,053	29.06	7,489	8.35
Gajapati	79	Parlakhemundi	Trinath Sahu	INC	37,453	43.52	Koduru Narayana Rao	IND	32,872	38.20	4,581	5.32
Rayagada	80	Gunupur (ST)	Hemabati Gamang	INC	41,111	41.45	Ramurty Gamango	BJP	21,203	21.38	19,908	20.07
Rayagada	81	Bissam; Cuttack (ST)	Dambarudhar Ulaka	INC	47,739	46.86	Sarangadhar Kadraka	BJD	34,672	34.03	13,067	12.83
Rayagada	82	Rayagada (ST)	Ulaka Rama Chandra	INC	59,807	53.00	Lal Bihari Himirika	BJD	40,057	35.50	19,750	17.50
Koraput	83	Lakshmipur (ST)	Anantaram Majhi	INC	45,224	46.66	Kamal Lochan Saunta	BJD	30,577	31.55	14,647	15.11
Koraput	84	Pottangi (ST)	Jayaram Pangi	BJD	52,208	47.12	Ramachandra Kadam	IND	28,606	25.82	23,602	21.30
Koraput	85	Koraput	Tara Prasad Bahinipati	INC	47,720	47.34	Gupta Prasad Das	BJD	38,617	38.31	9,103	9.03
Malkangiri	86	Malkangiri (SC)	Nimai Chandra Sarkar	INC	57,713	45.72	Arabinda Dhali	BJP	57,460	45.52	253	0.20
Malkangiri	87	Chitrakonda (ST)	Prahalad Dora	BJP	38,340	41.97	Mamata Madhi	INC	36,056	39.47	2,284	2.50
Koraput	88	Kotpad (ST)	Basudev Majhi	INC	52,702	47.13	Sadan Naik	BJP	48,967	43.79	3,735	3.34
Koraput	89	Jeypore	Rabi Narayan Nanda	BJD	63,141	55.54	Raghunath Patnaik	INC	43,118	37.93	20,023	17.61
Nowrangpur	90	Nowrangpur	Habibulla Khan	INC	50,742	49.31	Jayadev Parida	BJP	39,273	38.17	11,469	11.14
Nowrangpur	91	Kodinga (ST)	Sadan Nayak	INC	44,942	44.12	Mohan Majhi	BJP	42,348	41.57	2,594	2.55
Nowrangpur	92	Dabugam (ST)	Ramesh Ch. Majhi	BJD	56,755	46.91	Bhujabal Majhi	INC	42,200	34.88	14,555	12.03
Nowrangpur	93	Umarkote (ST)	Dharmu Gond	BJP	48,346	38.29	Jagabandhu Majhi	IND	35,696	28.27	12,650	10.02
Nawapara	94	Nawapara	Rajendra Dholakia	IND	41,679	36.86	Basanta Kumar Panda	BJP	39,384	34.83	2,295	2.03
Nawapara	95	Khariar	Duryodhan Majhi	BJD	61,956	54.18	Deb Singh Deo	INC	38,811	33.94	23,145	20.24
Kalahandi	96	Dharamgarh (SC)	Bira Sipka	BJD	52,567	48.25	Bhisma Sunani	INC	38,951	35.75	13,616	12.50
Kalahandi	97	Koksara	Pushpendra Singh Deo	BJD	54,270	52.77	Surendra Pattjoshi	OGP	23,945	23.28	30,325	29.49
Kalahandi	98	Junagarh	Himansu Sekhar Meher	BJP	39,150	36.36	Hemanta Kumar Panda	IND	13,168	12.23	25,982	24.13
Kalahandi	99	Bhawanipatna (SC)	Pradipta Kumar Naik	BJP	53,733	49.24	Anam Naik	INC	45,164	41.39	8,569	7.85
Kalahandi	100	Narla (ST)	Balabhadra Majhi	BJD	51,002	49.53	Kumarmani Sabar	INC	38,307	37.20	12,695	12.33
Kalahandi	101	Kesinga	Dhaneswar Majhi	BJP	48,525	44.85	Bhupinder Singh	INC	47,932	44.30	593	0.55
Kandhamal	102	Balliguda (ST)	Karendra Majhi	BJP	38,987	35.42	Sahura Mallick	INC	37,076	33.68	1,911	1.74
Kandhamal	103	Udayagiri (ST)	Ajayanti Pradhan	INC	54,248	48.76	Saluga Pradhan	BJD	40,749	36.62	13,499	12.14
Kandhamal	104	Phulbani (SC)	Padmanabha Behera	BJD	58,074	50.56	Radhakanta Digal	INC	41,943	36.51	16,131	14.05
Boudh	105	Boudh	Pradip Kumar Amat	BJD	41,475	38.73	Sujit Kumar Padhi	INC	30,439	28.43	11,036	10.30
Balangir	106	Titilagarh (SC)	Jogendra Behera	BJD	49,689	48.27	Ashima Mahananda	INC	41,593	40.41	8,096	7.86
Balangir	107	Kantabanji	Haji Md. Ayub Khan	IND	39,532	40.68	Santosh Singh Saluja	INC	31,144	32.05	8,388	8.63
Balangir	108	Patnagarh	Kanak Vardhan Deo	BJP	56,988	55.78	Bibekananda Meher	INC	36,168	35.40	20,820	20.38
Balangir	109	Saintala	Kalikesh Narayan Deo	BJD	32,059	33.58	Surendra Singh Bhoi	INC	28,877	30.25	3,182	3.33
Balangir	110	Loisingha	Narasingha Mishra	INC	31,487	29.70	Aakash Mishra	IND	27,571	26.00	3,916	3.70
Balangir	111	Bolangir	Ananga Udaya Deo	BJD	62,769	56.26	Md. Muzaffar H. Khan	INC	37,886	33.96	24,883	22.30
Subarnapur	112	Sonepur (SC)	Binod Patra	INC	46,655	42.09	Kunduru Kushal	BJD	45,976	41.48	679	0.61
Subarnapur	113	Binka	Niranjan Pujhari	BJD	54,298	41.05	Ashok Kumar Pujari	INC	40,286	30.46	14,012	10.59
Subarnapur	114	Birmaharajpur	Sanjeeb Kumar Sahoo	BJD	51,379	54.04	Kartik Prasad Taria	INC	36,760	38.67	14,619	15.37
Angul	115	Athmallik	Nagendra Pradhan	BJD	55,130	45.77	Amarnath Pradhan	INC	54,252	45.04	878	0.73
Angul	116	Angul	Rajani Kant Singh	BJD	61,298	44.73	Sangram K. Mishra	INC	42,849	31.27	18,449	13.46
Dhenkanal	117	Hindol (SC)	Anjali Behera	BJD	47,130	48.22	Trinath Behera	INC	41,676	42.64	5,454	5.58
Dhenkanal	118	Dhenkanal	Sudhir Kumar Samal	INC	53,477	49.71	Krushna Patra	BJP	48,011	44.63	5,466	5.08
Dhenkanal	119	Gondia	Saroj Kumar Samal	BJD	42,421	37.75	Nabin Nanda	SP	31,365	27.91	11,056	9.84
Angul	120	Kamakhyanagar	Prafulla Kumar Mallik	BJD	53,351	44.84	Satrughan Jena	IND	24,769	20.82	28,582	24.02
Angul	121	Pallahara	Nrusingha Sahu	INC	73,907	53.20	Debendra Pradhan	BJP	58,378	42.02	15,529	11.18
Angul	122	Talcher (SC)	Mahesh Sahoo	BJP	65,561	45.95	Akrura Sahoo	INC	54,196	37.99	11,365	7.96
Bargarh	123	Padampur	Satya Bhusan Sahu	INC	63,330	51.27	Bijaya Bariha	BJD	60,200	48.73	3,130	2.54
Bargarh	124	Melchhamunda	Mohammad Rafique	BJP	43,819	38.98	Prakash Chandra Debta	INC	43,548	38.74	271	0.24
Bargarh	125	Bijepur	Subal Sahu	INC	66,407	53.97	Ashok Km. Panigrahy	BJD	44,489	36.16	21,918	17.81
Bargarh	126	Bhatli (SC)	Bimbadhar Kuanr	BJP	43,622	42.08	Ripunath Seth	INC	43,456	41.92	166	0.16
Bargarh	127	Bargarh	Ananda Acharya	BJD	55,137	42.10	Sadhu Nepak	INC	50,995	38.94	4,142	3.16
Sambalpur	128	Sambalpur	Jayanarayan Mishra	BJP	64,597	52.10	Durga S. Patanaik	INC	48,835	39.39	15,762	12.71
Jharsuguda	129	Brajarajnagar	Anup Kumar Sai	INC	40,407	39.13	Suresh Pujari	BJP	39,261	38.02	1,146	1.11
Jharsuguda	130	Jharsuguda	Kishore Mohanty	BJD	61,295	52.04	Naba Das	INC	50,136	42.57	11,159	9.47
Jharsuguda	131	Laikera (ST)	Brundaban Majhi	BJP	48,081	46.73	Hemananda Biswal	INC	46,737	45.42	1,344	1.31
Sambalpur	132	Kuchinda (ST)	Rabi Narayan Naik	BJP	47,143	49.40	Sovaram Padhan	INC	42,558	44.60	4,585	4.80
Sambalpur	133	Rairakhol (SC)	Sanatan Bisi	BJD	36,260	38.55	Rama K. Mahananda	INC	24,465	26.01	11,795	12.54
Deogarh	134	Deogarh	Nitesh Ganga Deb	INC	62,487	51.19	Subash Panigrahi	BJP	48,606	39.82	13,881	11.37
Sundergarh	135	Sundargarh	Shankarsan Naik	BJP	54,956	50.12	Kishore C. Patel	INC	45,994	41.95	8,962	8.17
Sundergarh	136	Talsara (ST)	Gajadhar Majhi	INC	43,396	46.69	Baikuntha Kalo	BJP	42,437	45.66	959	1.03
Sundergarh	137	Rajgangpur (ST)	Gregory Minz	INC	59,165	50.79	Mangala Kisan	BJD	48,116	41.30	11,049	9.49
Sundergarh	138	Biramitrapur (ST)	Nihar Surin	JMM	37,753	43.01	George Tirkey	IND	27,728	31.59	10,025	11.42
Sundergarh	139	Rourkela	Sarada Nayak	BJD	72,343	58.51	Nihar Ray	INC	46,438	37.56	25,905	20.95
Sundergarh	140	Raghunathpali (ST)	Halu Mundary	JMM	35,521	33.07	Purnima Kerketta	BJP	34,809	32.41	712	0.66
Sundergarh	141	Bonai (ST)	Laxman Munda	CPM	37,890	40.17	Bhima Choudhury	BJP	32,163	34.10	5,727	6.07
Keonjhar	142	Champua (ST)	Dhanurjay Sidu	INC	38,050	39.02	Duryodhan Pingua	BJP	28,757	29.49	9,293	9.53
Keonjhar	143	Patna	Gourahari Naik	BJP	42,744	38.75	Satyabrata Naik	INC	36,124	32.75	6,620	6.00
Keonjhar	144	Keonjhar (ST)	Mohan Majhi	BJP	46,146	40.14	Madhab Sardar	INC	35,144	30.57	11,002	9.57
Keonjhar	145	Telkoi (ST)	Niladri Nayak	BJD	49,048	37.92	Prana Ballav Nayak	INC	46,289	35.79	2,759	2.13
Keonjhar	146	Ramchandrapur	Niranjan Patnaik	INC	54,884	38.98	Badri Narayan Patra	IND	54,402	38.63	482	0.35
Keonjhar	147	Anandapur (SC)	Jayadev Jena	INC	69,032	54.15	Mayadhar Jena	BJP	43,826	34.38	25,206	19.77

== Analysis & Govt Formation ==
Assembly was dissolved early almost a year ahead & election were called in line with 2004 Indian general election. NDA lost the general election but won 2004 Orissa Assembly election. Mr. Patnaik resigned on 15 May 2004 paving way for new govt.

Chief Minister Naveen Patnaik along with 14 Cabinet Ministers and 7 Minister of State were administered the oath of office and secrecy by Governor M. M. Rajendran at the Raj Bhavan, Bhubaneswar on 16 May 2004. No. of Ministers for BJD & BJP were divided on 2:1 ratio where BJD had the larger share of representation in the ministry with 14 ministers including the Chief Minister while the BJP had eight.

== See also ==
- List of constituencies of the Odisha Legislative Assembly
- 2004 elections in India
