= Satyajeet Gomango =

Indian politician

Member of the Odisha Legislative Assembly
- Incumbent
- Assumed office 4 June 2024
- Preceded by: Raghunath Gomango
- Constituency: Gunupur

Personal details
- Political party: Indian National Congress
- Profession: Politician

Satyajeet Gomango is an Indian millennial tribal politician from Odisha. He is currently a Member of the Odisha Legislative Assembly from 2024, representing Gunupur Assembly constituency as a Member of the Indian National Congress. He also serves as the Chairman of the Social Media Department for Odisha Pradesh Congress Committee which is a provincial unit of the Indian National Congress. He is also part of the all party task force for the formation of South Odisha Development Council which has been constituted by the Chief Minister of Odisha. He holds a Bachelor's degree in Science.

== See also ==
- 2024 Odisha Legislative Assembly election
- Odisha Legislative Assembly
