= Saptagiri Sankar Ulaka =

Member of the Lok Sabha

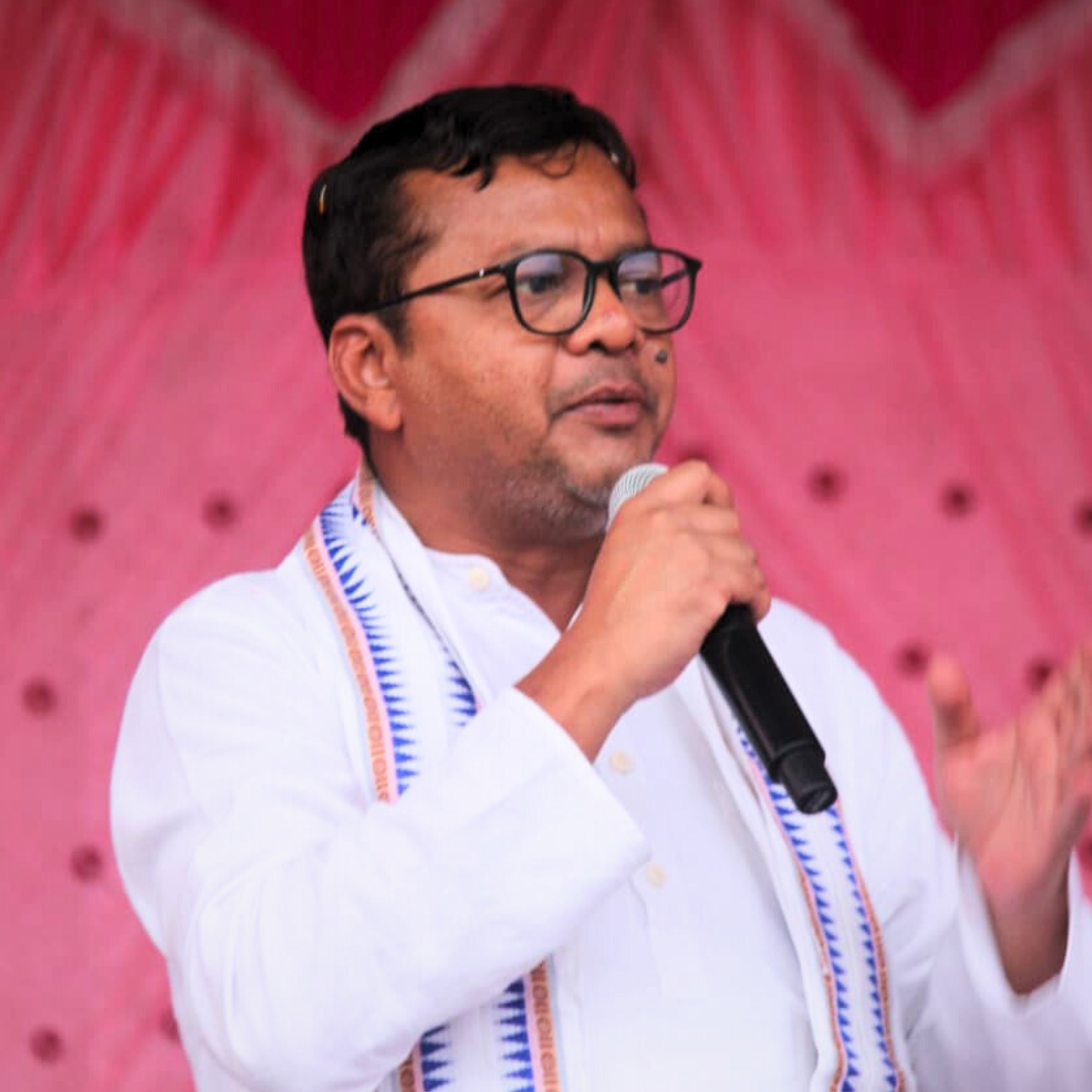

Member of Parliament, Lok Sabha
- Incumbent
- Assumed office 23 May 2019
- Preceded by: Jhina Hikaka
- Constituency: Koraput

AICC Incharge for Tripura PCC, Manipur PCC, Nagaland PCC, Sikkim PCC
- Incumbent
- Assumed office 14 February 2025
- Preceded by: Girish Chodankar

Personal details
- Born: 1 January 1979 (age 47) Rayagada, Odisha, India
- Party: Indian National Congress
- Spouse: Pooja Ulaka (m. 2013)
- Parents: Ramachandra Ulaka (father); Ratnamani Ulaka (mother)
- Education: Utkal University

Saptagiri Sankar Ulaka (born January 1, 1979) is an Indian tribal politician, software professional and tribal rights activist from Rayagada, Koraput. A member of the Indian National Congress (INC), he is one of the party’s tribal leaders from eastern India and currently chairs the Parliamentary Standing Committee on Rural Development & Panchayati Raj. The panel has been vocal on revision of MNREGA wages and ease of wage/labour payments. Currently he is appointed as the AICC In-charge for Tripura, Manipur, Nagaland, and Sikkim.

Elected to the 17th Lok Sabha, lower house of the Parliament of India from Koraput, Odisha in the 2019 Indian general election as a member of the Indian National Congress. Saptagiri retained his seat again by winning with a margin of 1,47,744 votes in the 2024 Indian general election. He is currently the only member from Odisha Congress in the Lok Sabha

== Early life and education ==
Saptagiri hails from a political family of South Odisha belonging to the Jatapu tribal community, his father was a veteran politician and lawmaker Ramachandra Ulaka who was a two term MP from Koraput and seven time MLA from Rayagada. Saptagiri's mother Ratnamani Ulaka is a member of AICC and State Vice President of Odisha Mahila Congress.

Saptagiri knows Kui, Odia, English, Telugu, Hindi, and German. This linguistic exposure has shaped his focus on grassroots advocacy and policy-level reforms enabling him to bridge the gap between the indigenous peoples and that of rest of India. Saptagiri Sankar Ulaka is married to Pooja Ulaka who is a social activist & social entrepreneur. The couple together have two children Nandini & Ramachandra Ulaka.

== Professional career ==
Saptagiri, a software engineer, employed as a Senior Project Manager at Infosys in the United States. He held positions at companies including Ranbaxy and HCL Technologies. His corporate experience, which spans domestic and international work, provided him with expertise in structured project delivery, multi-stakeholder management, and technology-driven solutions. He later applied these skills to roles in his constituency and governance.

== Political career ==
He has been instrumental in raising his voice for a High Court Bench in undivided Koraput among many other issues that are pertinent to the welfare and development of Koraput. The Parliamentary Constituency of Koraput & South Odisha at large have benefitted due to an upgraded airport at Jeypore after consistent demands in the Lok Sabha for the upgradation of the existing Jeypore airstrip into a full fledged commercial airport by Saptagiri. The Jeypore Airport since June 2022 has been commercially operational. Saptagiri has also been raising the voice of the Opposition in the Lok Sabha and in protests on bringing attention to the rising violence amongst women in Odisha. Due to the Koraput MPs sustained efforts mobile and cellular connectivity has greatly increased in Koraput and Rayagada districts of Odisha where the hilly terrain makes it extremely challenging to set up mobile towers. Saptagiri through the Universal Service Obligation Fund(USOF) has initiated and completed the erection of 1482 mobile towers at a cost of 1350 crore rupees (US$160 million).

== Roles ==
- Chairperson, Standing Committee on Rural Development & Panchayati Raj (2024–present).
- Member, Standing Committee on Food, Consumer Affairs and Public Distribution (2019–present)
- Member, Committee on Papers Laid on the Table (2019–present)
- Member, Consultative Committee, Ministry of Steel
- Member, Consulatative Committee On Defence (2024–present)
- AICC In-charge for Tripura, Manipur, Nagaland, Sikkim (2025–present)
- Participant in the India-Japan Forum 2024 edition (a platform for Indian and Japanese leadership on the future of bilateral and strategic partnerships through deliberation and collaboration)

== Parliamentary Interventions ==
1. Recognition of Jhodia & Dhurua Community

Ulaka has introduced a Private Member’s Bill seeking Scheduled Tribe status for the Jhodia and Dhurua communities. On 21 February 2025, he met President Droupadi Murmu to press for the restoration of ST status for the Jhodia, which had been excluded since 1997. Ministry confirmed the proposal was under review by the Registrar General of India and the NCST.

2. Forest Rights Act (FRA)

He questioned Ministry of Tribal Affairs on implementation gaps. Govt reply (May 2025): 5.12 million claims filed nationwide, 2.51 million titles granted; Odisha filed 736,172 claims, received 470,899 titles and demanded reduction in rejection rates and faster title issuance.

3. Adjournment Motion on Crimes Against Women

July 2025 motion cited: 54 gang rapes, 36,420 missing women, 8,403 missing children, 421 trafficking cases, 26 hostel student deaths.Called for hostel safety norms, legal aid, trauma counselling, and fast-track courts.

4. Balasore Self-Immolation

Raised in Zero Hour and via adjournment motion (22 July 2025). Proposed POSH-compliant grievance systems, campus counselling units, and institutional accountability mechanisms.

5. Infrastructure & Connectivity

Advocated for Jeypore Airport commercial operations. He pushed for NH-326 bypass completion and departmental execution after failed private bids. Called for a permanent High Court bench in undivided Koraput.

6. Eklavya Model Residential Schools

Flagged that one-third of sanctioned EMRS were non-functional and pressed for teacher recruitment and infrastructure completion.

7. Agricultural Policy

Questioned MSP policy for tribal crops and also has promoted GI-tagged Kalajeera rice for domestic and export markets.

8. Minority Rights

Protested in Parliament over the arrest and harassment of Catholic nuns in Chhattisgarh.

9. Air Connectivity: Jeypore Airport

Ulaka championed the upgradation of the Jeypore airstrip into a commercial airport under the UDAN regional connectivity scheme. The airport now operates regular flights to Bhubaneswar and Visakhapatnam, boosting trade and tourism in South Odisha.

10. Industrial Development: Kansariguda Alumina Refinery

Ulaka raised the issue of the stalled Kansariguda Alumina Refinery project, noting that land had been acquired over 14 years earlier but the plant remained incomplete. He called for its immediate commissioning to create jobs and boost the local economy.

11. Education: Kendriya Vidyalaya, Jeypore and Central University of Odisha

In the 17th Lok Sabha, Ulaka made a Special Mention demanding the establishment of a Kendriya Vidyalaya in Jeypore to cater to the educational needs of the region. He has also pressed the Union Ministry of Education to expedite recruitment of faculty at the Central University of Odisha, Koraput, to address significant staff shortages.

=== Electoral performance ===
Year	Election	Party	Constituency Name	Result	Votes gained	Vote share%	Margin
2019	17th Lok Sabha	INC	Koraput	Won	3,71,129	34.36%	3,613
2024	18th Lok Sabha	INC	Koraput	Won	4,71,393	41.03%	1,47,744
