= Sabitri Agarwalla =

Indian politician

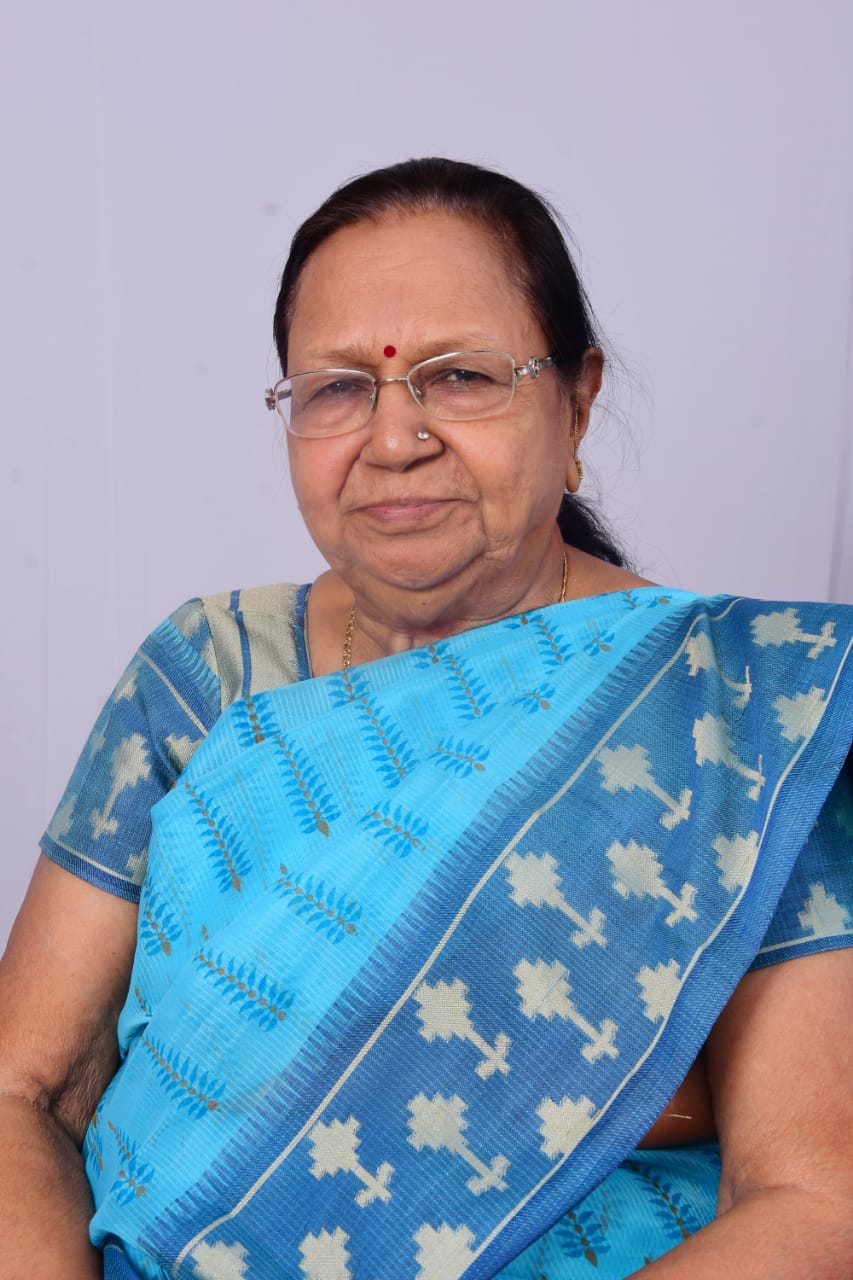
- Constituency: Patkura

Sabitri Agarwalla is an Indian politician from Odisha. She was elected as the MLA from Patkura constituency in 2019. Sabitri is from Biju Janta Dal and defeated congress candidate Jayanta Mohanty and BJP candidate Bijay Mohapatra, winning by 17, 920 votes.
