= Jeypore Assembly constituency =

Constituency of the Odisha legislative assembly in India

Coordinates: 18.87°N 82.55°E

Jeypore
- Constituency No. 143 for the Odisha Legislative Assembly

Constituency details
- Country: India
- Region: East India
- State: Odisha
- Division: Southern Division
- District: Koraput
- Lok Sabha constituency: Koraput
- Established: 1951
- Total electors: 2,14,757 (Note: as on 2024) (Note: as data published by election commission)
- Reservation: None

Member of Legislative Assembly
- 17th Odisha Legislative Assembly
- Incumbent Tara Prasad Bahinipati
- Party: Indian National Congress
- Elected year: 2024

Jeypore is a Vidhan Sabha constituency of Koraput district, Odisha.

Map of Jeypore Constituency

This constituency includes Jeypore, Jeypore block, 19 Gram panchayats (BB.Singpur, Benagam, Bodigam, Borigumma, Champapadar, Gujuniguda, Gumuda, Haridaguda, Hordali, Kamta, Katharagada, Kumuli, Munja, Narigam, Nuagam, Ranaspur, Sargiguda, Semolaguda and Benasur) of Borigumma block.

== Elected members ==
Vote share of winning candidates
2024	41.89%
2019	37.87%
2014	44.62%
2009	46.12%
2004	55.54%
2000	57.60%
1995	53.27%
1990	47.69%
1985	71.27%
1980	69.46%
1977	55.21%

Since its formation in 1951, 18 elections were held till date including in one bypoll in 1969. It was a 2 member constituency for 1952 & 1957.

List of members elected from Jeypore constituency are:

Year	Member	Party
2024	Tara Prasad Bahinipati	Indian National Congress
2019	Tara Prasad Bahinipati	Indian National Congress
2014	Tara Prasad Bahinipati	Indian National Congress
2009	Rabi Narayan Nanda	Biju Janata Dal
2004	Rabi Narayan Nanda	Biju Janata Dal
2000	Rabi Narayan Nanda	Biju Janata Dal
1995	Raghunath Patnaik	Indian National Congress
1990	Raghunath Patnaik	Indian National Congress
1985	Gupta Prasad Das	Indian National Congress
1980	Raghunath Patnaik	Indian National Congress (I)
1977	Raghunath Patnaik	Indian National Congress
1974	Raghunath Patnaik	Indian National Congress
1971	Pratap Narayan Singh Deo	Swatantra Party
1969 (bypoll) (Note: Death of Ramseshaiah N.)	Pratap Narayan Singh Deo	Swatantra Party
1967	Ramseshaiah N.	Swatantra Party
1961	Raghunath Patnaik	Indian National Congress
1957 (Note: It was a 2 member constituency)	Laichhan Naik	Ganatantra Parishad
1957	Harihar Mishra	Ganatantra Parishad
1951 (Note: It was a 2 member constituency)	Laichhan Naik	Ganatantra Parishad
1951	Harihar Mishra	Ganatantra Parishad

== Election results ==
=== 2024 ===
Voting was held on 13th May 2024 in 1st phase of the Odisha Assembly Election & 4th phase of the Indian General Election. The Counting of votes was on 4th June 2024. In 2024 election, Indian National Congress candidate Tara Prasad Bahinipati defeated Biju Janata Dal candidate Indira Nanda by a margin of 13,111 votes.

2024 Odisha Vidhan Sabha Election: Jeypore
Party	Candidate	Votes	%	±%
INC	Tara Prasad Bahinipati	69,592	41.89	▲4.02
BJD	Indira Nanda	56,481	34.00	▼0.42
BJP	Goutam Samantray	31,107	18.72	▼2.69
NOTA	None of the above	2,367	1.42	▼0.10
Majority		13,111	7.89	▲4.44
Turnout		1,66,143	77.36	▲2.78
INC hold				

=== 2019 ===
In 2019 election, Indian National Congress candidate Tara Prasad Bahinipati defeated Biju Janata Dal candidate Rabi Narayan Nanda by a margin of 5,451 votes.

2019 Odisha Vidhan Sabha Election: Jeypore
Party	Candidate	Votes	%	±%
INC	Tara Prasad Bahinipati	59,785	37.87	−
BJD	Rabi Narayan Nanda	54,334	34.42	−
BJP	Goutam Samantray	33,805	21.41	−
NOTA	None of the above	2,397	1.52	−
Majority		5,451	3.45	−
Turnout		1,57,862	74.58	−
INC hold				

=== 2014 ===
In 2014 election, Indian National Congress candidate Tara Prasad Bahinipati defeated Biju Janata Dal candidate Rabi Narayan Nanda by a margin of 8,367 votes.

2014 Odisha Vidhan Sabha Election: Jeypore
Party	Candidate	Votes	%	±%
INC	Tara Prasad Bahinipati	65,378	44.62	−
BJD	Rabi Narayan Nanda	57,011	38.91	−
BJP	Bhrugu Baxipatra	14,462	9.87	−
Majority		8,367	5.71	−
Turnout		1,46,572	78	−
INC gain from BJD				

=== 2009 ===
In 2009 election, Biju Janata Dal candidate Rabi Narayan Nanda defeated Bharatiya Janata Party candidate Tara Prasad Bahinipati by a margin of 9,316 votes.

2009 Odisha Vidhan Sabha Election: Jeypore
Party	Candidate	Votes	%	±%
BJD	Rabi Narayan Nanda	57,504	46.12	−
BJP	Tara Prasad Bahinipati	48,188	38.65	−
INC	K. Nagraj Dora	9,398	7.54	−
Majority		9,316	7.47 (Note: %of total valid votes)	−
Turnout		1,24,685	70.10 (Note: 2004 Voter turnout was 69.69%)	▲0.41
BJD hold				
