= Lal Bihari Himirika =

Indian politician

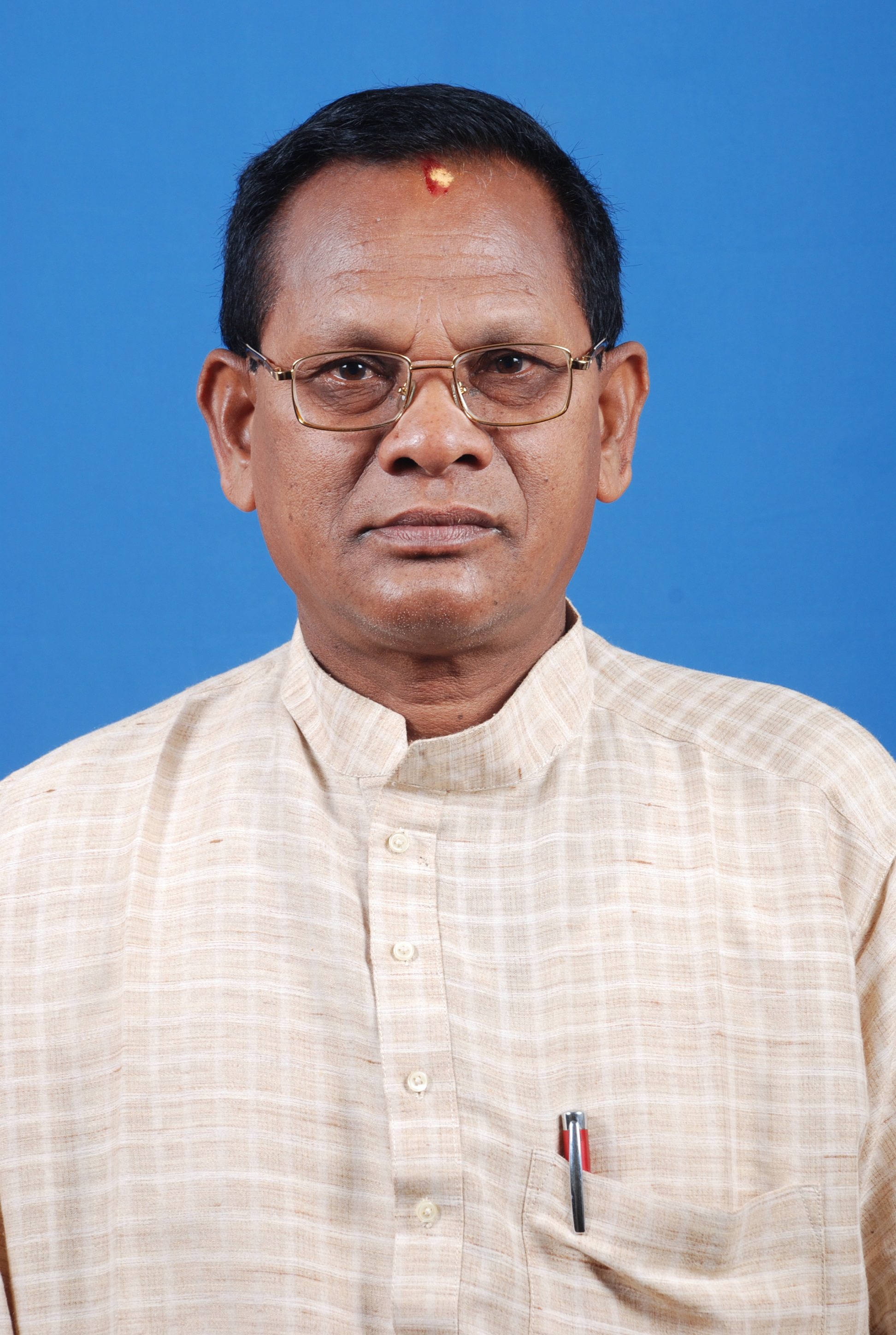

Member of Odisha Legislative Assembly
- In office 2009–2019
- Preceded by: Himself
- Succeeded by: Makaranda Muduli
- Constituency: Rayagada

Member of Odisha Legislative Assembly
- In office 2000–2004
- Preceded by: Ramachandra Ulaka
- Succeeded by: Ramachandra Ulaka
- Constituency: Rayagada

Personal details
- Party: Biju Swabhiman Mancha Party (Since September 2025)
- Other political affiliations: Biju Janata Dal (Before September 2025)
- Spouse: Apalamma Himirika
- Education: Under Matric
- Occupation: Politician
- Portfolio: SC & ST development minister

Lal Bihari Himirika (Odia: ଲାଲ ବିହାରୀ ହିମିରିକା, born 17 February 1948) is an Indian politician. He was a member of Biju Janata Dal (BJD) until his resignation . He was MLA of Rayagada constituency of Odisha. He represented the Odisha Assembly from Rayagada Vidhan Sabha constituency in 2009 and 2014 assembly elections.

== Personal Background ==
Sri Himirika hails from Penta village of Rayagada district in the state of Odisha.

== Political career ==
Started his career as a union worker in the JK paper mills, Jaykaypur. He served as the SC & ST development minister in the 15th assembly of Odisha. Sri Ramesh Chandra Majhi succeeded him in May 2017. He also served as a member of the KBK Committee. Himirika was later appointed the president of Rayagada district BJD.

=== Committee membership ===
- Member -House Committee on environment- 2000-2001
- Member -Committee on welfare of SC & ST- 2000-2001
- Member -House Committee on Cooperatives- 2001-2002
- Member -House Committee on environment- 2001-2002
- Member -Committee on welfare of SC & ST- 2001-2002
- Member -House Committee on Cooperatives- 2001-2002
- Member -House Committee on environment- 2002-2003
- Member -Committee on welfare of SC & ST- 2002-2003
- Member -House Committee on Cooperatives- 2003-2004
- Member -Committee on welfare of SC & ST- 2003-2004
