= Arvind Mohapatra =

Indian politician

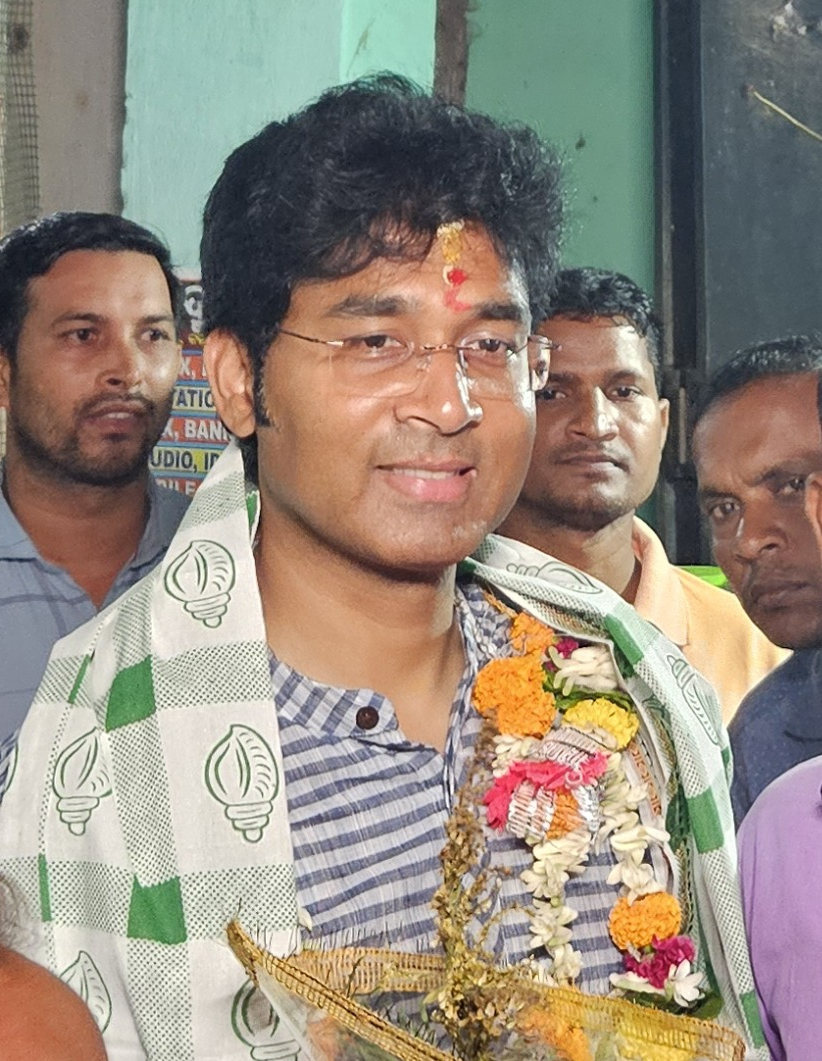
- Arvind Mohapatra in 2024

Member of Odisha Legislative Assembly
- Incumbent
- Assumed office 4 June 2024
- Preceded by: Sabitri Agarwalla
- Constituency: Patkura

Personal details
- Party: Biju Janata Dal
- Profession: Politician

Arvind Mohapatra is an Indian politician. He was elected to the Odisha Legislative Assembly from Patkura as a member of the Biju Janata Dal.
