= Rama Chandra Kadam =

Indian politician from Odisha

CLP leader in Odisha Assembly
- Incumbent
- Assumed office 21 July 2024
- Preceded by: Narasingha Mishra

Member of the Odisha Legislative Assembly
- Incumbent
- Assumed office 2024
- Preceded by: Pitam Padhi
- Constituency: Pottangi
- In office 2009 – 2014
- Preceded by: Jayaram Pangi
- Succeeded by: Prafulla Kumar Pangi
- Constituency: Pottangi
- In office 1995 – 2000
- Preceded by: Jayaram Pangi
- Succeeded by: Jayaram Pangi
- Constituency: Pottangi

Personal details
- Born: 22 November 1964 (age 61)
- Party: Indian National Congress
- Children: 1 son & 1 daughter
- Occupation: Agriculturist, Social Work

Rama Chandra Kadam (born 22 November 1964) is an Indian tribal leader, social worker and politician from Odisha and a member of Odisha Legislative Assembly from Pottangi constituency. He is a member of the Indian National Congress and a three time elected MLA, making him one of the senior most members in the current MLA cohort of the Odisha Pradesh Congress in the Legislative Assembly.

He belongs to the Gadaba tribe which is an ethnic group and are classified as scheduled tribe in Andhra Pradesh and Odisha who speak the Gutob language which belongs to the Austroasiatic language family.

Rama was born to Urdhab Kadam. He is married to Devaki Kadam together they have one son and a daughter.

Rama has consistently been active in raising important issues in the Assembly, voicing his concerns and that of the Indian National Congress MLA Cohort and of the party state unit. He has been raising concerns in the house regarding introduction of an Integrated Teacher Education Programme in government colleges across Koraput, Rayagada and Malkangiri districts of Odisha.

On 21 July 2024 he was appointed Congress Legislative Party (CLP) leader in Odisha Legislative Assembly. He is part of the Odisha Pradesh Congress Committee panel created to probe the public humiliation and torture of two Dalit men who transporting cattle. The panel seeks to investigate as why The two Dalit men were allegedly tonsured, assaulted and forced to crawl on their knees and consume grass and drain water on suspicion of cattle smuggling.

Rama is currently Chairman of the Departmentally Related Standing Committee VI and also is a member of the Business Advisory Committee and Public Accounts Committee of the Odisha Legislative Assembly. He as leader of the Congress lawmaker cohort in the Odisha Assembly has been very vocal about creation of a House Standing Committee on women safety.
