= Makaranda Muduli =

Indian politician

Member of Odisha Legislative Assembly
- In office 2019–2024
- Preceded by: Lal Bihari Himirika
- Constituency: Rayagada

Personal details
- Profession: Politician

Makaranda Muduli is an Indian politician from Odisha. He was a Member of the Odisha Legislative Assembly from 2019, representing Rayagada Assembly constituency as an Independent candidate.

== See also ==
- 2019 Odisha Legislative Assembly election
- Odisha Legislative Assembly
