= Ramachandra Ulaka =

Indian politician

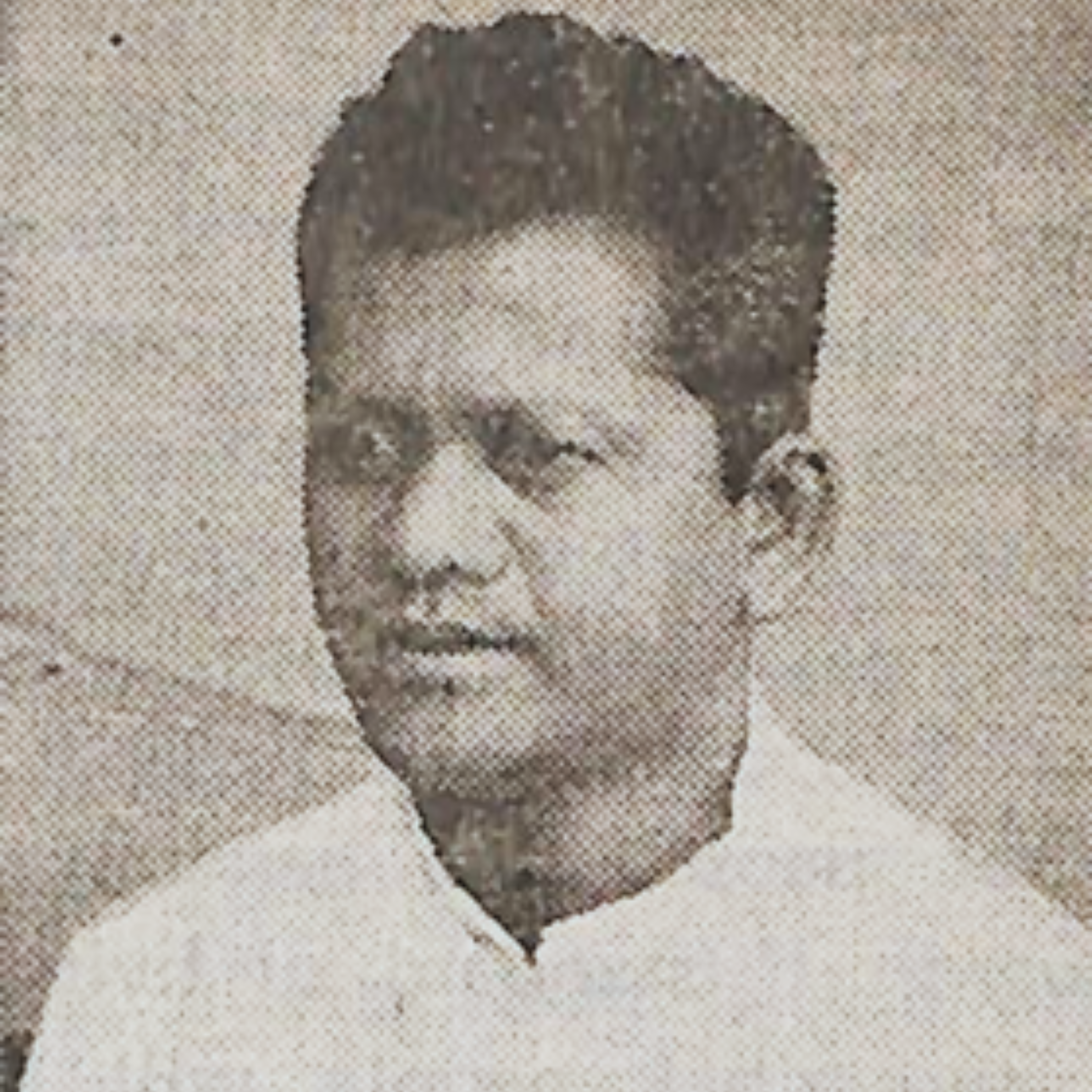

Member of Parliament, Lok Sabha
- In office 1962–1971
- Preceded by: T. Sanganna
- Succeeded by: Bhagirathi Gamang
- Constituency: Koraput

Member of Odisha Legislative Assembly
- In office 2004–2009
- Preceded by: Lal Bihari Himirika
- Succeeded by: Lal Bihari Himirika
- Constituency: Rayagada
- In office 1974–2000
- Preceded by: Himirika Raghunath
- Succeeded by: Lal Bihari Himirika
- Constituency: Rayagada

Leader of Opposition in the Odisha Legislative Assembly
- In office 24 January 2009 – 19 May 2009
- Preceded by: Janaki Ballabh Patnaik
- Succeeded by: Bhupinder Singh

Personal details
- Born: 1 July 1934 Ambodala, Odisha, India
- Died: 25 December 2011 (aged 77)
- Party: Indian National Congress
- Children: Saptagiri Sankar Ulaka
- Parent: Shyamaghana Ulaka (father)

Ramachandra Ulaka was an Indian politician from the Jatapu tribal community. He was elected to the Lok Sabha, lower house of the Parliament of India from Koraput in Odisha as a member of the Indian National Congress. In his electoral career Ramachandra has represented as MLA from Rayagada Assembly Constituency seven times and later on twice represented Koraput Lok Sabha Constituency.

His son Saptagiri Sankar Ulaka is also in politics and is the current Member of parliament from Koraput Lok Sabha Constituency.
