= Bhagirathi Gomango =

Indian politician

Bhagirathi Gamang

Member of Parliament, Lok Sabha
- In office 1971-1972
- Preceded by: Ramachandra Ulaka
- Succeeded by: Giridhar Gamang
- Constituency: Koraput, Odisha

Personal details
- Party: Indian National Congress

Bhagirathi Gamang was an Indian politician. He was elected to the Lok Sabha lower house of the Parliament of India from Koraput, Odisha as a member of the Indian National Congress.

He died in 2013.
