= Tara Prasad Bahinipati =

Politician from Odisha, India

Member of the Odisha Legislative Assembly
- Incumbent
- Assumed office 2014
- Preceded by: Rabi Narayan Nanda
- Constituency: Jeypore
- In office 2000–2009
- Preceded by: Gupta Prasad Das
- Succeeded by: Raghuram Padal
- Constituency: Koraput

Personal details
- Born: 30 December 1956 (age 69)
- Citizenship: India
- Party: Indian National Congress
- Spouse: Minakhi Bahinipati
- Children: 2
- Parent(s): Anantaram Bahinipati, Sarojini Bahinipati
- Occupation: Politician

Tara Prasad Bahinipati (born 30 December 1956) is an Indian politician from Odisha. He is currently serving as an MLA in Odisha Legislative Assembly. In 2000, 2004, 2014,2019 and 2024, he was elected to the 12th, 13th, 15th, 16th and 17th Odisha Legislative Assembly from Koraput and Jeypore Assembly constituencies respectively.

Tara Prasad Bahinipati was born to Anantaram and Sarojini Bahinipati. He is married to Minakhi Bahipati and together they have two children. He is known for his unique electioneering campaigns during local and general election in Jeypore and is fondly known as "Bhalu Bhaina" across the political spectrum of the state He is the only Indian National Congress Odisha MLA to have an artist listing Apple Itunes with rap, hip-hop, r&b music on social issues and the Corona Pandemic.

He is currently serving as Member of the Odisha Legislative Assembly from the Jeypore Assembly constituency having won on an Indian National Congress ticket. He was the President of Odisha Police/OSAP, Havildar, Constable & Sepoy Confederation from 1985 to 1993. It is an officially recognized body that represents the interests of havildars, constables, and sepoys within the Odisha Police and Odisha Special Armed Police (OSAP).
