= Pabitra Saunta =

Indian politician

Member of the Odisha Legislative Assembly
- Incumbent
- Assumed office June 2024
- Preceded by: Prabhu Jani
- Constituency: Laxmipur

Personal details
- Party: Indian National Congress
- Occupation: Politician

Pabitra Saunta is an Indian politician from Odisha and a member of Odisha Legislative Assembly from 2024, representing Laxmipur. He is a member of the Indian National Congress.
