= Pottangi Assembly constituency =

Constituency of the Odisha legislative assembly in India

Coordinates: 18.57°N 82.97°E

Pottangi
- Constituency No. 145 for the Odisha Legislative Assembly

Constituency details
- Country: India
- Region: East India
- State: Odisha
- Division: Southern Division
- District: Koraput
- Lok Sabha constituency: Koraput
- Established: 1957
- Total electors: 1,87,219 (Note: as on 2024) (Note: as data published by election commission)
- Reservation: ST

Member of Legislative Assembly
- 17th Odisha Legislative Assembly
- Incumbent Rama Chandra Kadam
- Party: Indian National Congress
- Elected year: 2024

Pottangi is a Vidhan Sabha constituency of Koraput district, Odisha, India.

Map of Pottangi Constituency

This constituency includes Damanjodi, Pottangi block, Nandapur block, Semiliguda block and 3 Gram panchayats (Litiguda, Dumuripadar and Mathalput) of Koraput block.

== Members of Legislative Assembly ==
Vote share of winning candidates
2024	33.70%
2019	35.14%
2014	47.12%
2009	41.60%
2004	47.12%
2000	64.46%
1995	49.10%
1990	70.68%
1985	43.69%
1980	61.86%
1977	52.87%

Since its formation in 1951, 14 elections were held till date.

List of members elected from Pottangi constituency are:

Year	Member	Party
2024	Rama Chandra Kadam	Indian National Congress
2019	Pitam Padhi	Biju Janata Dal
2014	Prafulla Kumar Pangi	Biju Janata Dal
2009	Rama Chandra Kadam	Indian National Congress
2004	Jayaram Pangi	Biju Janata Dal
2000	Jayaram Pangi	Biju Janata Dal
1995	Rama Chandra Kadam	Indian National Congress
1990	Jayaram Pangi	Janata Dal
1985	Chandrama Santha	Indian National Congress
1980	Chandrama Santha	Indian National Congress (I)
1977	Jayaram Pangi	Janata Party
1974	Dissari Sannu	Utkal Congress
1967-1971 : Constituency did not exist
1961	Pangi Musuri Santa	Indian National Congress
1957	Malu Santha	Indian National Congress

== Election results ==
=== 2024 ===
Voting were held on 13th May 2024 in 1st phase of Odisha Assembly Election & 4th phase of Indian General Election. Counting of votes was on 4th June 2024. In 2024 election, Indian National Congress candidate Rama Chandra Kadam defeated Biju Janata Dal candidate Prafulla Kumar Pangi by a margin of 1,919 votes.

2024 Odisha Vidhan Sabha Election: Pottangi
Party	Candidate	Votes	%	±%
INC	Rama Chandra Kadam	52,202	33.70	▲1.47
BJD	Prafulla Kumar Pangi	50,283	32.46	▼2.68
BJP	Nandibali Chaitanya	35,461	22.89	▲5.09
NOTA	None of the above	6,420	4.14	▲0.22
Majority		1,919	1.24	▼1.76
Turnout		1,54,922	82.75	▲6.49
INC gain from BJD				

=== 2019 ===
In 2019 election, Biju Janata Dal candidate Pitam Padhi defeated Indian National Congress candidate Rama Chandra Kadam by a margin of 4,255 votes.

2019 Odisha Vidhan Sabha Election: Pottangi
Party	Candidate	Votes	%	±%
BJD	Pitam Padhi	51,244	35.14	−
INC	Rama Chandra Kadam	46,989	32.23	−
BJP	Rama Chandra Pangi	25,956	17.8	−
NOTA	None of the above	5,715	3.92	−
Majority		4,255	3.00	−
Turnout		1,45,812	76.26	−
BJD hold				

=== 2014 ===
In 2014 election, Biju Janata Dal candidate Prafulla Chandra Pangi defeated Indian National Congress candidate Rama Chandra Kadam by a margin of 12,564 votes.

2014 Odisha Vidhan Sabha Election: Pottangi
Party	Candidate	Votes	%	±%
BJD	Prafulla Chandra Pangi	46,839	38.1	−
INC	Rama Chandra Kadam	36,075	29.35	−
BJP	Krushna Chandra Jani	9,401	7.65	−
NOTA	None of the above	4,995	4.06	−
Majority		12,564	8.75	−
Turnout		1,22,966	71.00	−
BJD gain from INC				

=== 2009 ===
In 2009 election, Indian National Congress candidate Rama Chandra Kadam defeated Biju Janata Dal candidate Prafulla Chandra Pangi by a margin of 5,436 votes.

2009 Odisha Vidhan Sabha Election: Pottangi
Party	Candidate	Votes	%	±%
INC	Rama Chandra Kadam	41,451	41.60	−
BJD	Prafulla Kumar Pangi	36,015	36.14	−
BJP	Dhanpati Eading	9,257	9.29	−
Majority		5,436	5.46 (Note: % of total valid votes)	−
Turnout		99,646	59.96 (Note: 2004 Voter turnout was 65.10%)	▲5.14
INC gain from BJD				
