= Patkura Assembly constituency =

Constituency of the Odisha legislative assembly in India

Coordinates: 20.39°N 86.41°E

Patkura
- Constituency No. 96 for the Odisha Legislative Assembly

Constituency details
- Country: India
- Region: East India
- State: Odisha
- Division: Central Division
- District: Kendrapara
- Lok Sabha constituency: Kendrapara
- Established: 1951
- Total electors: 2,52,438 (Note: as on 2024) (Note: as data published by election commission)
- Reservation: None

Member of Legislative Assembly
- 17th Odisha Legislative Assembly
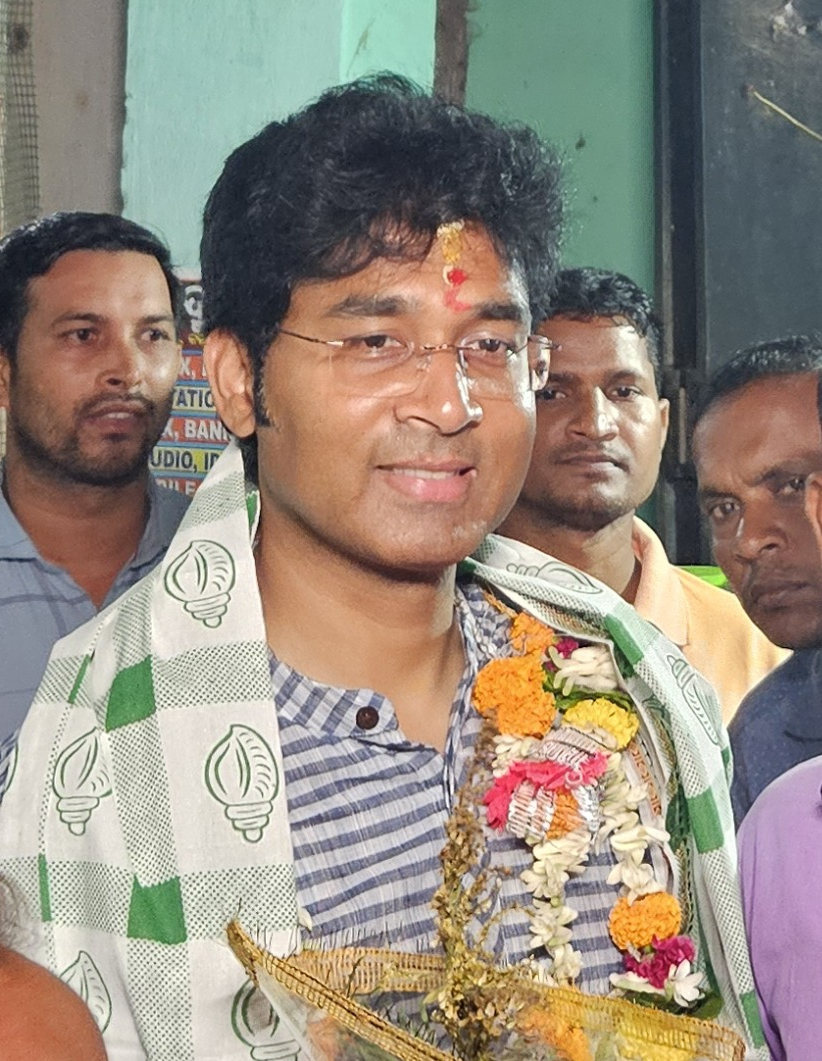
- Incumbent Arvind Mohapatra
- Party: Biju Janata Dal
- Elected year: 2024

Patkura is a Vidhan Sabha constituency of Kendrapara district, Odisha.

This constituency includes Derabish block, Garadapur and 7 Gram panchayats (Jalapoka, Karilopatna, Aitipur, Jamapada, Mehendinagar, Bachharai and Bandhakata) of Marshaghai block.

== Elected members ==
Vote share of winning candidates
2024	49.64%
2019	53.91%
2014	56.42%
2009	49.12%
2004	49.57%
2000	55.47%
1995	50.83%
1990	72.41%
1985	48.74%
1980 (bypoll)	44.59%
1980	52.86%
1977	65.50%

Since its formation in 1951, 18 elections were held till date including one bypoll in 1980.

List of members elected from Patkura constituency are:

Year	Member	Party
2024	Arvind Mohapatra	Biju Janata Dal
2019	Sabitri Agrawalla	Biju Janata Dal
2014	Bed Prakash Agarwal	Biju Janata Dal
2009	Bed Prakash Agarwal	Biju Janata Dal
2004	Atanu Sabyasachi Nayak	Biju Janata Dal
2000	Trilochan Behera	Trinamool Congress
1995	Bijoy Mohapatra	Janata Dal
1990	Bijoy Mohapatra	Janata Dal
1985	Bijoy Mohapatra	Janata Party
1980 (bypoll) (Note: Resignation of Biju Patnaik)	Bijoy Mohapatra	Janata Party (Secular)
1980	Biju Patnaik	Janata Party (Secular)
1977	Prahlad Mallik	Janata Party
1974	Rajakishore Nayak	Utkal Congress
1971	Rajakishore Nayak	Utkal Congress
1967	Chakradhar Satpathy	Praja Socialist Party
1961	Lokanath Misra	Indian National Congress
1957	Lokanath Misra	Indian National Congress
1951	Lokanath Misra	Indian National Congress

== Election results ==
=== 2024 ===
Voting were held on 1 June 2024 in 4th phase of Odisha Assembly Election & 7th phase of Indian General Election. Counting of votes was on 4 June 2024. In 2024 election, Biju Janata Dal candidate Arvind Mohapatra defeated Bharatiya Janata Party candidate Tejeswar Parida by a margin of 13,822 votes.

2024 Odisha Vidhan Sabha Election, Patkura
Party	Candidate	Votes	%	±%
BJD	Arvind Mohapatra	90,905	49.64	▼3.87
BJP	Tejeswar Parida	77,083	42.09	▼1.77
INC	Ratikanta Kanungo	12,091	6.60	▲5.42
NOTA	None of the above	564	0.31	▲0.10
Majority		13,822	7.55	
Turnout		1,83,132	72.55	
BJD hold				

=== 2019 ===
In 2019 election, Biju Janata Dal candidate Sabitri Agarwalla defeated Bharatiya Janata Party candidate Bijoy Mohapatra by a margin of 17,920 votes.

2019 Vidhan Sabha Election, Patkura
Party	Candidate	Votes	%	±%
BJD	Sabitri Agarwalla	96,030	53.91	−
BJP	Bijoy Mohapatra	78,132	43.86	−
INC	Jayanta Kumar Mohanty	2,106	1.18	−
NOTA	None of the above	368	0.21	−
Majority		17,655	10.05	−
Turnout		1,78,130	72.78	−
Registered electors		2,44,747		
BJD hold				

=== 2014 ===
In 2014 election, Biju Janata Dal candidate Bed Prakash Agarwal defeated Indian National Congress candidate Jayanta Kumar Mohanty by a margin of 47,715 votes.

2014 Vidhan Sabha Election, Patkura
Party	Candidate	Votes	%	±%
BJD	Bed Prakash Agarwal	89,853	56.42	−
INC	Jayanta Kumar Mohanty	42,138	26.46	−
BJP	Manas Ranjan Mohanty	21,588	13.56	−
NOTA	None of the above	908	0.57	−
Majority		47,715	29.96	−
Turnout		1,59,260	69.9	−
Registered electors		2,27,826		
BJD hold				

=== 2009 ===
In 2009 election, Biju Janata Dal candidate Bed Prakash Agarwal defeated Bharatiya Janata Party candidate Bijoy Mohapatra by a margin of 26,735 votes.

2009 Vidhan Sabha Election, Patkura
Party	Candidate	Votes	%	±%
BJD	Bed Prakash Agarwal	71,725	49.12	−
BJP	Bijoy Mohapatra	44,990	30.81	−
INC	Narayan Prasad Swain	26,131	17.89	−
Majority		26,735	18.31 (Note: % of total valid votes)	−
Turnout		1,46,064	68.57	−
Registered electors		2,13,025		
BJD hold				
