= Rayagada Assembly constituency =

Constituency of the Odisha legislative assembly in India

Coordinates: 19.17°N 83.41°E

Rayagada
- Constituency No. 140 for the Odisha Legislative Assembly

Constituency details
- Country: India
- Region: East India
- State: Odisha
- Division: Southern Division
- District: Rayagada
- Lok Sabha constituency: Koraput
- Established: 1951
- Total electors: 2,55,053 (Note: as on 2024) (Note: as data published by election commission)
- Reservation: ST

Member of Legislative Assembly
- 17th Odisha Legislative Assembly
- Incumbent Kadraka Appala Swamy
- Party: Indian National Congress
- Elected year: 2024

Rayagada is a Vidhan Sabha constituency of Rayagada district, Odisha.

Map of Rayagada Constituency

This constituency includes Rayagada, Rayagada block and Kashipur block.

== Elected members ==
Vote share of winning candidates
2024	45.81%
2019	30.21%
2014	41.45%
2009	44.45%
2004	53.00%
2000	48.03%
1995	69.01%
1990	58.30%
1985	75.44%
1980	85.37%
1977	63.95%

Since its formation in 1951, 17 elections have been held in the constituency till date.

List of members elected from Rayagada constituency are:

Year	Member	Party
2024	Kadraka Appala Swamy	Indian National Congress
2019	Makaranda Muduli	Independent politician
2014	Lal Bihari Himirika	Biju Janata Dal
2009	Lal Bihari Himirika	Biju Janata Dal
2004	Ulaka Rama Chandra	Indian National Congress
2000	Lal Bihari Himirika	Biju Janata Dal
1995	Ulaka Rama Chandra	Indian National Congress
1990	Ulaka Rama Chandra	Indian National Congress
1985	Ulaka Rama Chandra	Indian National Congress
1980	Ulaka Rama Chandra	Indian National Congress (I)
1977	Ulaka Rama Chandra	Indian National Congress
1974	Ulaka Rama Chandra	Indian National Congress
1971	Himirika Raghunath	Indian National Congress (R)
1967	Anantaram Majhi	Indian National Congress
1961	Mandangi Kamaya	Indian National Congress
1957	Mandangi Kamaya	Indian National Congress
1951	Mandangi Kamaya	Indian National Congress

== Election results ==
=== 2024 ===
Voting were held on 13th May 2024 in 1st phase of Odisha Assembly Election & 4th phase of Indian General Election. Counting of votes was on 4th June 2024. In 2024 election, Indian National Congress candidate Kadraka Appala Swamy defeated Biju Janata Dal candidate Anusaya Majhi by a margin of 29,186 votes.

2024 Odisha Vidhan Sabha Election: Rayagada
Party	Candidate	Votes	%	±%
INC	Kadraka Appala Swamy	87,482	45.81	▲23.14
BJD	Anusaya Majhi	58,296	30.52	▲3.10
BJP	Basanta Kumar Ullaka	24,548	12.85	▼1.11
NOTA	None of the above	4,676	2.45	▼0.96
Majority		29,186	15.29	▲12.50
Turnout		1,90,986	72.91	▼0.82
INC gain from Independent				

=== 2019 ===
In 2019 election, Independent candidate Makaranda Muduli defeated Biju Janata Dal candidate Lal Bihari Himirika by a margin of 4,870 votes.

2019 Odisha Vidhan Sabha Election: Rayagada
Party	Candidate	Votes	%	±%
Independent	Makaranda Muduli	52,844	30.21	
BJD	Lal Bihari Himirika	47,974	27.42	
INC	Kadraka Appala Swamy	39,657	22.67	
BJP	Basanta Kumar Ullaka	24,425	13.96	
NOTA	None of the above	5,965	3.41	
Majority		4,870	2.79	
Turnout		1,74,942	73.73	
Independent gain from BJD				

=== 2014 ===
In 2014 election, Biju Janata Dal candidate Lal Bihari Himirika defeated Indian National Congress candidate Makaranda Muduli by a margin of 8,286 votes.

2014 Odisha Vidhan Sabha Election: Rayagada
Party	Candidate	Votes	%	±%
BJD	Lal Bihari Himirika	69,629	41.45	▼3.0
INC	Makaranda Muduli	61,343	36.52	▲5.24
BJP	Kaliram Majhi	17,356	10.33	▲3.69
NOTA	None of the above	6,900	4.11	−
Majority		8,286	4.93	▼8.24
Turnout		1,67,972	78.84	▲17.8
Registered electors		2,13,044		
BJD hold				

=== 2009 ===
In 2009 election, Biju Janata Dal candidate Lal Bihari Himirika defeated Indian National Congress candidate Ulaka Rama Chandra by a margin of 15,661 votes.

2009 Odisha Vidhan Sabha Election: Rayagada
Party	Candidate	Votes	%	±%
BJD	Lal Bihari Himirika	52,847	44.45	▲8.95
INC	Ulaka Rama Chandra	37,186	31.28	▼21.72
BSP	Bhaskar Mutuka	9,213	7.75	−
BJP	Kaliram Majhi	7,890	6.64	−
Majority		15,661	13.17 (Note: % of total valid votes)	−
Turnout		1,19,480	61.04 (Note: 2004 Voter turnout was 63.24%)	▼2.2
BJD gain from INC				
