= Jhina Hikaka =

Indian politician

Member: 16th Lok Sabha
- In office 2014–2019
- Preceded by: Jayaram Pangi
- Succeeded by: Saptagiri Ulaka
- Constituency: Koraput

Member: Legislative Assembly of Odisha
- In office 19 May 2009 – 16 May 2014
- Preceded by: Anantaram Majhi
- Succeeded by: Kailash Chandra Kulesika
- Constituency: Laxmipur

Personal details
- Born: KORAPUT
- Party: Biju Janata Dal
- Spouse: Kaushalya Hikaka
- Children: Rohit Hikaka, Kiran Hikaka, Divyanshu Hikaka
- Profession: Politician

Jhina Hikaka is a member of the Biju Janata Dal (BJD) political party. He is elected to the 16th Lok Sabha in 2014 from Koraput constituency in Odisha. He was a MLA from Laxmipur assembly constituency of Koraput district in Odisha. He was kidnapped by Maoists and kept in captivity for 33 days before being released unharmed on 26 April 2012.

== See also ==
- Indian general election, 2014 (Odisha)
