= Kadraka Appala Swamy =

Indian politician

Member of the Odisha Legislative Assembly
- Incumbent
- Assumed office 4 June 2024
- Preceded by: Makaranda Muduli
- Constituency: Rayagada

Personal details
- Party: Indian National Congress
- Profession: Politician

Kadraka Appala Swamy is an Indian politician from the southern Odisha town of Rayagada. He was elected to the Odisha Legislative Assembly from 2024, representing Rayagada as a member of the Indian National Congress.

His father's name is Kadraka Dharma and he is married to Bimala Huika who is an Anganwadi worker by profession.

He has been very vocal in the Odisha State Legislative Assembly about large-scale discrepanies in allocation of lands to the landless and remittance of payouts to farmers during the governmental paddy procurement. Also he has raised the matter of farmer suicides plaguing his constituency in the local media and also in the Assembly.
