= Odisha Gana Parishad =

- Abbreviation: OGP
- Founder: Bijoy Mohapatra
- Founded: 2000
- Dissolved: 2007
- Split from: Biju Janata Dal
- Merged into: Nationalist Congress Party
- Ideology: Centre
- Political position: Big tent
- Alliance: Nationalist Congress Party

The Odisha Gana Parishad (ଓଡ଼ିଶା ଗଣ ପରିଷଦ; Odisha Popular Association), was an Indian political party in the Indian state of Odisha, a splinter group of Biju Janata Dal. The party was founded on 29 October 2000. The president of OGP was Sri Bijoy Mohapatra. Mahapatra had been expelled from BJD in February 2000 and had come into conflict with BJD leader Sri Nabeen Pattanaik over the election of Sri Dilip Ray to the Rajya Sabha.

In the 2004 elections, OGP was allied with Indian National Congress and had four candidates to the Odisha state legislative assembly, out of whom two got elected.

The student wing of OGP was called Orissa Chhatra Parishad.

In 2007, OGP merged with Nationalist Congress Party.
