= Jayaram Pangi =

Indian politician

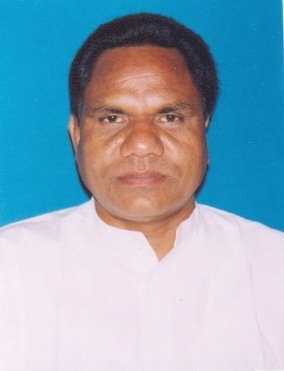
- Portrait of Jayaram Pangi

Member: 15th Lok Sabha
- In office 2009–2014
- Preceded by: Giridhar Gamang
- Succeeded by: Jhina Hikaka
- Constituency: Koraput

Personal details
- Party: INC
- Other political affiliations: Janata Dal, Biju Janata Dal, Bharatiya Janata Party, Bharat Rashtra Samithi

Jayaram Pangi (born 16 August 1955) is an Indian politician of Indian National Congress. He was a member of the Indian Parliament, representing the Koraput. On 9 May 2017 he left BJD and joined hands with Bharatiya Janta Party. He contested the 2019 Lok Sabha election from Koraput seat on a BJP ticket and lost to Congress candidate Saptagiri Ulaka.

Jayaram Pangi on 6 October 2021 quit the BJP and joined BRS party at Hyderabad in the presence of Telangana Chief Minister K Chandrasekhar Rao in January 2023.

Jayaram Pangi left BRS joined Congress on 2 December 2023 in the presence of PCC president Sarat Pattanayak, Bijay Patnaik, Niranjan Patnaik, and Prasad Harichandan.

== See also ==
- Koraput (Lok Sabha constituency)
- Indian general election in Orissa, 2009
- Biju Janata Dal
- Bharatiya Janta Party
