= Bijoy Mohapatra =

Indian politician

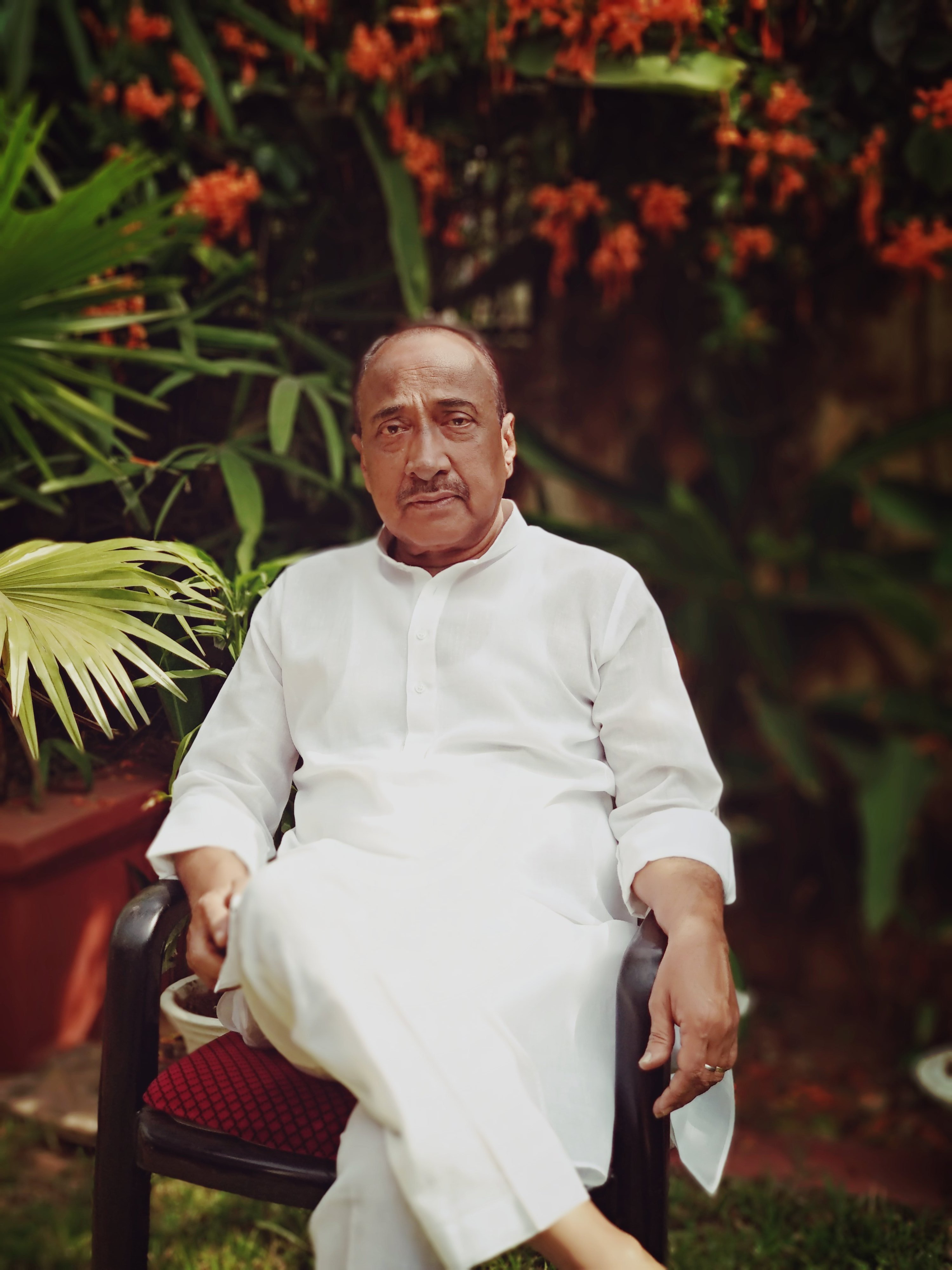

Member: Odisha Legislative Assembly
- In office 1980–2000
- Preceded by: Biju Patnaik
- Succeeded by: Trilochan Behera
- Constituency: Patkura

Minister Of Odisha Govt. UnderBiju Patnaik Cabinet
- In office 1990–1995

Personal details
- Born: 7 November 1950 (age 75) Talakusuma
- Party: Bharatiya Janata Party ( Till May 2024) Independent Party (May 2024-present)
- Other political affiliations: Nationalist Congress Party; Odisha Gana Parishad; Biju Janata Dal; Janata Dal; Janata Party
- Children: Arvind Mohapatra
- Education: Utkal University
- Profession: Politician
- Cabinet: Irrigation Minister (1990-1995), Minister of Parliamentary Affairs

Bijoy Mohapatra (born 7 November 1950) is a politician from Odisha. A leader of the Bharatiya Janata Party, he was Irrigation Minister of Odisha from 1990 to 1995 in the Biju Patnaik Cabinet. He was the most powerful minister (known as Super Chief Minister) in Biju Patnaik's cabinet. He was four times MLA from Patkura Constituency of Kendrapara district. He won four straight elections in 1980, 1985, 1990 and 1995.

== Early life ==
After the completion of his early education at Korua High School, in 1965, Mohapatra received his B.A. degree from Kendrapara College, Utkal University in 1969. He later received his LLB.

== Political career ==
Mohapatra was the popular leader in Kendrapara district from Janata Dal. He contested from the Patkura seat in assembly elections of 1980, '85, '90 and '95. In 1990 when Janata Dal won Biju Patnaik became CM. He appointed Mohapatra as the minister of Power, Irrigation & Parliamentary Matters. He was considered as "super chief minister" (the most powerful) in Biju Babu's cabinet. In 1995 Janata Dal lost & Congress won.

Mohapatra played an instrumental role in the formation of Biju Janata Dal in 1997 after the demise of Bijayananda Pattanaik. He was one of the founding members of Biju Janata Dal and one of the most powerful leaders in the party. He was the chairman of the Political Affairs Committee of the party. He was the leader of a group of leaders in the party, and was opposed to many decisions of party President Naveen Patnaik.

In 2000, after filing a nomination paper for the Odisha Assembly elections in 2000, Mohapatra was busy in parliamentary board meeting of Biju Janata Dal as the chairman of parliamentary affairs committee. In the meantime, Naveen Patnaik as the president of the party, cancelled Mohapatra's ticket and gave it to Atanu Sabyasachi Nayak, a journalist who is the son of an Ex MLA. Due to lack of time, Bijoy couldn't reach to file a new nomination. Bijoy proceeded to support Trilocahan Behera, a candidate of the Trinamool Congress, who won the seat by more than 40,000 votes over Atanu Sabyasachi, the official BJD nominee. The understanding was that Behera would vacate the seat for Bijoy. It is speculated that leaders like Pyarimohan Mohapatra had a role behind the ouster of Bijoy.

However, supporters of Mohapatra in the BJD could not get a majority in the BJD legislature party in the 2000 elections. As a result, Naveen Pattanaik was elected as the leader of BJD legislature Party and a BJP-BJD government came to power in Odisha. After his failure to get the post of BJD legislature party, many of Mohapatra's supporters in the BJD kept mum or even supported Naveen Patnaik.

In 2001, Bijoy formed Odisha Gana Parishad, a regional party. A majority of his supporters in the BJD did not join it, though, as they did not want to lose their power. The OGP formed an alliance with the Indian National Congress in the 2004 assembly elections, and got only four seats to contest. The Party won two of these seats, but Mohapatra narrowly lost his bid.

Due to financial constraints, Bijoy decided to merge his party with the NCP, and became its head in Odisha. However, before the 2009 elections, Sharad Pawar, NCP National President decided to ally with BJD. In protest, Bijoy resigned from NCP in 2009 and joined BJP.

Presently, Mohapatra is a national executive member of BJP. However, due to very poor organisational strength of BJP in coastal Odisha, Bijoy lost the Assembly elections in 2009 and 2014, contesting from the Patkura and Mahakalapada Assembly seats respectively. Despite the setbacks, Mohapatra has decided to stay with BJP for the present. He was selected as the Campaign Committee Chairman of BJP for the Kandhamal Lok Sabha by-election in 2014.

Bijoy was sidelined in Odisha BJP since 2016, when Basant Panda was elected as BJP state president. He finally quit BJP on 30 November 2018 but returned again to BJP on 27 March 2019.

Bijoy Mohapatra was expelled from BJP for alleged anti-party activities in May, 2024.
