= Hema Gamang =

Indian politician and social worker

- ହେମା ଗମାଙ୍ଗ
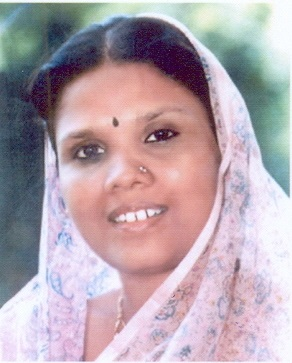
- Portrait of Hema Gomang

Member: 13th Lok Sabha
- In office 1999-2004
- Preceded by: Giridhar Gamang
- Succeeded by: Giridhar Gamang
- Constituency: Koraput

Personal details
- Born: 31 March 1961 (age 65) Khilapadar, Odisha, India
- Party: Indian National Congress(before 2014, 2024 - present)
- Other political affiliations: Biju Janata Dal (2014–2018); Bharat Rashtra Samithi
- Spouse: Giridhar Gamang
- Education: Rama Devi Women's College
- Profession: Politician, Social Worker

Hema Gamang (born 31 March 1961) is a political and social worker and a Member of Parliament elected from the Koraput constituency in the Indian state of Odisha as an Indian National Congress candidate.

== Early life ==
Gamang was born on 31 March 1961 in Khilapadar in Koraput district, Odisha. Gamang is an intermediate graduate and completed her schooling from Rama Devi Women's College, Bhubaneshwar, Odisha.

== Career ==
Gamang was elected to the 13th Lok Sabha in 1999. From 1999 to 2000, she was a member on the Committee on Urban and Rural Development. Then, from 2000 to 2004, she served as a member on Consultative Committee, Ministry of Steel. She was also a Member of Telephone Advisory Committee, Odisha.

In 2014, she joined the Biju Janata Dal. In 2023, she, along with her husband and son joined the Bharat Rashtra Samithi.

== Personal life ==
She married Giridhar Gamang on 4 April 1975 and has two sons and a daughter.
