= 8th Orissa Legislative Assembly =

8th state legislature of the Indian state of Orissa

←	7th Assembly	9th Assembly	→
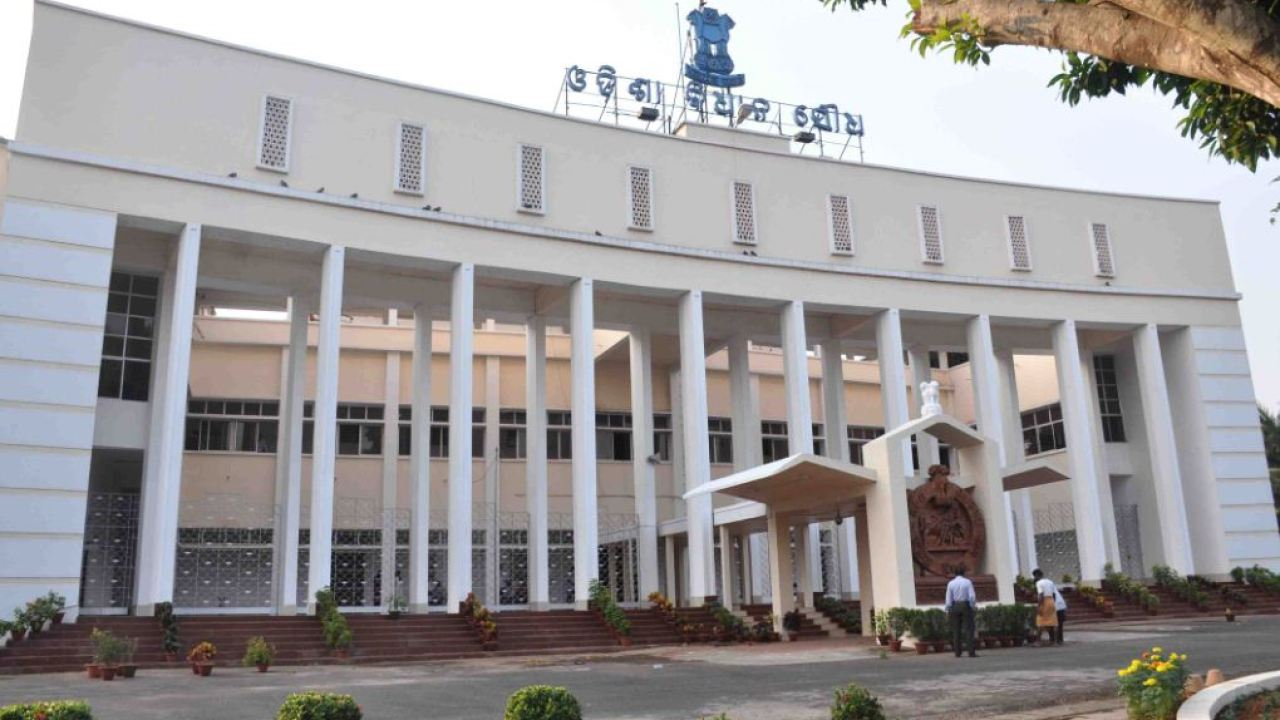
- Front view of Odisha Vidhan Saudha, Bhubaneshwar (2010)

Overview
- Meeting place: Odisha Vidhan Saudha, Bhubaneshwar, Odisha, India
- Term: 9 June 1980 – 9 March 1985
- Election: 1980 Orissa Legislative Assembly election
- Government: Indian National Congress (I)
- Opposition: Janata Party (Secular)
- Website: assembly.odisha.gov.in

Orissa Legislative Assembly
- House Composition
- Members: 147
- Governor: C. M. Poonacha; Justice Sukanta Kishore Ray (Acting); Justice Ranganath Misra (Acting); Bishambhar Nath Pande
- Speaker: Somnath Rath, INC (I); Prasanna Kumar Dash, INC (I)
- Deputy Speaker: Himansu Sekhar Padhi, INC (I)
- Leader of the House (Chief Minister): Janaki Ballabh Patnaik, INC (I)
- Leader of Opposition: No Official Opposition (1980-1984); Sarat Kumar Deb, JP(S) (1984-1985)
- Party control: Indian National Congress (I) (118/147)
- 10 Session with 176 Sittings

The Eighth Orissa Legislative Assembly was convened after 1980 Orissa Legislative Assembly election.

== Brief history ==
Following Cong (I) victory in 1980 Indian general election, Opposition led state govt were dismissed and early election were called. Dissatisfied with Janata Govt., Cong (I) was voted to power in 1980 Orissa Assembly election. Chief Minister Janaki Ballabh Patnaik along with 7 Cabinet ministers, 10 Ministers of state and 1 deputy minister were administered the oath of office and secrecy by Governor C. M. Poonacha at the Raj Bhavan, Bhubaneswar on 9 June 1980. Ministry was further expanded on 14 July 1981 & 10 February 1984. Following Cong win in 1985 Orissa Assembly election due to the sympathy wave created by the unfortunate death of Indira Gandhi, Chief Minister Janaki Patnaik resigned on 10 March 1985.

== House Composition ==
Party	Strength
Indian National Congress (I)	118
Janata Party (Secular)	13
Communist Party of India	4
Janata Party	3
Indian National Congress (U)	2
Independent	7

== Office Bearers ==
Post	Portrait	Name	Tenure		Party
Governor		C. M. Poonacha	Assembly Begins	30 September 1980	N/A
Governor		Justice; Sukanta Kishore Ray (Acting)	1 October 1980	3 November 1980	N/A
Governor		C. M. Poonacha	4 November 1980	24 June 1982	N/A
Governor		Justice; Ranganath Misra (Acting)	25 June 1982	31 August 1982	N/A
Governor		C. M. Poonacha	1 September 1982	17 August 1983	N/A
Governor		Bishambhar Nath Pande	17 August 1983	Assembly Dissolves	N/A
Speaker		Somnath Rath; MLA from Bhanjanagar	12 June 1980	11 February 1984	Indian National Congress (I)
Speaker		Prasanna Kumar Dash; MLA from Baripada	22 February 1984	14 March 1985	Indian National Congress (I)
Deputy Speaker		Himansu Sekhar Padhi; MLA from Boudh	2 July 1980	9 March 1985	Indian National Congress (I)
Leader of the House (Chief Minister); Leader of INC (I) Legislature Party		Janaki Ballabh Patnaik; MLA from Athgarh	9 June 1980	10 March 1985	Indian National Congress (I)
Leader of Opposition; Leader of JP (S) Legislature Party	Vacant (Note: No party was able to secure 10% of assembly strength i.e. 14 seats)		9 June 1980	1 April 1984	N/A
Leader of Opposition; Leader of JP (S) Legislature Party		Sarat Kumar Deb; MLA from Aul	2 April 1984	10 March 1985	Janata Party (Secular)
Pro tem Speaker		Prasanna Kumar Dash; MLA from Baripada	11 June 1980	12 June 1980	Indian National Congress (I)

== Council of Ministers ==
Source
Portfolio	Portrait	Name Constituency	Tenure		Party
Chief Minister; Home; General Administration; Planning & Coordination; Industries; Information & Public Relations; Irrigation & Power; Other departments not allocated to any Minister.		Janaki Ballabh Patnaik; MLA from Athgarh	9 June 1980	10 March 1985	INC(I)
Science & Technology; Environment; Tourism; Culture		Janaki Ballabh Patnaik; MLA from Athgarh	9 June 1980	14 July 1981	INC(I)
Community Development & Rural Reconstruction		Janaki Ballabh Patnaik; MLA from Athgarh	14 April 1982	10 February 1984	INC(I)
Science & Technology; Environment; Sports; Culture		Janaki Ballabh Patnaik; MLA from Athgarh	10 February 1984	10 March 1985	INC(I)
Agriculture		Janaki Ballabh Patnaik; MLA from Athgarh	31 December 1984	10 March 1985	INC(I)
Co-operation; Finance; Law		Janaki Ballabh Patnaik; MLA from Athgarh	12 February 1985	10 March 1985	INC(I)
Cabinet Minister
Education & Youth Services		Gangadhar Mohapatra; MLA from Brahmagiri	9 June 1980	10 March 1985	INC(I)
Harijan & Tribal Welfare		Ulaka Rama Chandra; MLA from Rayagada	9 June 1980	10 March 1985	INC(I)
Finance		Raghunath Patnaik; MLA from Jeypore	9 June 1980	12 February 1985	INC(I)
Law		Raghunath Patnaik; MLA from Jeypore	14 July 1981	12 February 1985	INC(I)
Agriculture; Co-operation		Basudev Mahapatra; MLA from Balikuda	9 June 1980	10 February 1984	INC(I)
Agriculture		Somanath Rath; MLA from Bhanjanagar	10 February 1984	31 December 1984	INC(I)
Food & Civil Supplies		Upendra Dikshit; MLA from Brajarajnagar	9 June 1980	14 July 1981	INC(I)
Works		Dayanidhi Naik; MLA from Bhawanipatna	9 June 1980	14 July 1981	INC(I)
Excise; Revenue		Kanhu Charan Lenka; MLA from Choudwar	9 June 1980	14 July 1981	INC(I)
Revenue; Transport		Upendra Dikshit; MLA from Brajarajnagar	14 July 1981	10 February 1984	INC(I)
Revenue; Transport		Basudev Mahapatra; MLA from Balikuda	10 February 1984	10 March 1985	INC(I)
Commerce		Dayanidhi Naik; MLA from Bhawanipatna	14 July 1981	10 February 1984	INC(I)
Commerce		Upendra Dikshit; MLA from Brajarajnagar	10 February 1984	10 March 1985	INC(I)
Labour & Employment		Upendra Dikshit; MLA from Brajarajnagar	10 February 1984	10 March 1985	INC(I)
Minister of State
Irrigation & Power		Niranjan Patnaik; MLA from Ramchandrapur	9 June 1980	10 March 1985	INC(I)
Industries		Kishore Chandra Patel; MLA from Sundargarh	9 June 1980	10 March 1985	INC(I)
Housing & Urban Development; Mines & Geology		Basanta Kumar Biswal; MLA from Tirtol	9 June 1980	10 March 1985	INC(I)
Works		Basanta Kumar Biswal; MLA from Tirtol	14 July 1981	10 March 1985	INC(I)
Sports		Basanta Kumar Biswal; MLA from Tirtol	21 February 1984	10 March 1985	INC(I)
Health & Family Welfare		Harihar Karan; MLA from Daspalla	9 June 1980	11 February 1984	INC(I)
Health & Family Welfare		Jugal Kishore Pattanayak; MLA from Bhadrak	11 February 1984	10 March 1985	INC(I)
Forest; Fisheries & Animal Husbandry		Kuanria Majhi; MLA from Baisinga	9 June 1980	11 February 1984	INC(I)
Forest; Fisheries & Animal Husbandry		Harihar Karan; MLA from Daspalla	11 February 1984	10 March 1985	INC(I)
Labour & Employment; Sports; Tourism; Culture		Jugal Kishore Pattanayak; MLA from Bhadrak	9 June 1980	11 February 1984	INC(I)
Law; Commerce and Transport		Krushna Chandra Patnaik; MLA from Berhampur	9 June 1980	14 July 1981	INC(I)
Information & Public Relations		Lalit Mohan Gandhi; MLA from Titilagarh	9 June 1980	14 July 1981	INC(I)
Planning & Coordination		Lalit Mohan Gandhi; MLA from Titilagarh	9 June 1980	10 February 1984	INC(I)
Agriculture; Co-operation		Habibulla Khan; MLA from Nowrangpur	9 June 1980	14 July 1981	INC(I)
Excise		Habibulla Khan; MLA from Nowrangpur	14 July 1981	10 March 1985	INC(I)
Community Development & Rural Reconstruction		Bhajaman Behara; MLA from Talcher	9 June 1980	14 July 1981	INC(I)
Community Development & Rural Reconstruction		Krushna Chandra Patnaik; MLA from Berhampur	14 July 1981	14 April 1982	INC(I)
Community Development & Rural Reconstruction		Bhajaman Behara; MLA from Talcher	11 February 1984	10 March 1985	INC(I)
Food & Civil Supplies		Bhajaman Behara; MLA from Talcher	14 July 1981	11 February 1984	INC(I)
Food & Civil Supplies		Kishore Chandra Patel; MLA from Sundargarh	11 February 1984	10 March 1985	INC(I)
Co-operation		Kuanria Majhi; MLA from Baisinga	11 February 1984	12 February 1985	INC(I)
Deputy Minister
Community Development & Rural Reconstruction		Saraswati Hembram; MLA from Kuliana	9 June 1980	9 March 1985	INC(I)

== Members of Legislative Assembly ==
Source
District	AC. No.	Constituency	Member	Party	Remarks
Mayurbhanj	1	Karanjia (ST)	Raghunath Hembram	Janata Party (Secular)	
Mayurbhanj	2	Jashipur (ST)	Sundar Mohan Majhi	Indian National Congress (I)	
Mayurbhanj	3	Bahalda (ST)	Rama Chandra Hansdah	Indian National Congress (I)	
Mayurbhanj	4	Rairangpur (ST)	Sidhalal Murmu	Indian National Congress (I)	
Mayurbhanj	5	Bangriposi (ST)	Kangoi Singh	Indian National Congress (I)	
Mayurbhanj	6	Kuliana (ST)	Saraswati Hembram	Indian National Congress (I)	
Mayurbhanj	7	Baripada	Prasanna Kumar Dash	Indian National Congress (I)	Speaker
Mayurbhanj	8	Baisinga (ST)	Kuanria Majhi	Indian National Congress (I)	
Mayurbhanj	9	Khunta (ST)	Ramesh Soren	Indian National Congress (I)	
Mayurbhanj	10	Udala (ST)	Rauaneswar Madhei	Indian National Congress (I)	
Baleshwar	11	Bhograi	Kartikeswar Patra	Indian National Congress (I)	
Baleshwar	12	Jaleswar	Gadadhar Giri	Janata Party	
Baleshwar	13	Basta	Bhopal Chandra Mohapatra	Indian National Congress (I)	
Baleshwar	14	Balasore	Arun Dey	Communist Party of India	
Baleshwar	15	Soro	Pitambar Panda	Communist Party of India	
Baleshwar	16	Simulia	Parsuram Panigrahi	Janata Party	
Baleshwar	17	Nilgiri	Akshaya Kumar Acharya	Indian National Congress (I)	
Baleshwar	18	Bhandaripokhari (SC)	Purusottam Sethi	Indian National Congress (I)	
Baleshwar	19	Bhadrak	Jugal Kishore Pattanaik	Indian National Congress (I)	
Baleshwar	20	Dhamnagar	Jagannath Rout	Indian National Congress (I)	
Baleshwar	21	Chandbali (SC)	Netrananda Mallick	Indian National Congress (I)	
Baleshwar	22	Basudevpur	Jagabandhu Das	Indian National Congress (I)	
Cuttack	23	Sukinda	Sarat Rout	Indian National Congress (I)	
Cuttack	24	Korai	Ashok Kumar Das	Janata Party (Secular)	
Cuttack	25	Jajpur (SC)	Niranjan Jena	Indian National Congress (I)	
Cuttack	26	Dharamsala	Kangali Panda	Independent	
Cuttack	27	Barchana	Sitakanta Mohapatra	Indian National Congress (I)	
Cuttack	28	Bari-Derabisi	Srikant Kumar Jena	Janata Party (Secular)	
Cuttack	29	Binjharpur (SC)	Naba Kishore Mallik	Indian National Congress (I)	
Cuttack	30	Aul	Sarat Kumar Deb	Janata Party (Secular)	Leader of Opposition
Cuttack	31	Patamundai (SC)	Biswanath Mallik	Indian National Congress (I)	
Cuttack	32	Rajnagar	Nalinikanta Mohanty	Janata Party (Secular)	
Cuttack	33	Kendrapara	Indramani Rout	Indian National Congress (I)	
Cuttack	34	Patkura	Biju Pattanaik	Janata Party (Secular)	Resignation in June 1980 on his election to 7th Lok Sabha.
Cuttack	34	Patkura	Bijoy Mohapatra	Janata Party (Secular)	Won in 1980 Bypoll.
Cuttack	35	Tirtol	Basant Kumar Biswal	Indian National Congress (I)	
Cuttack	36	Ersama	Damodar Rout	Janata Party (Secular)	
Cuttack	37	Balikuda	Basudeba Mohapatra	Indian National Congress (I)	
Cuttack	38	Jagatsinghpur (SC)	Krushna Chandra Mallik	Indian National Congress (I)	
Cuttack	39	Kissannagar	Surendranath Patnaik	Independent	
Cuttack	40	Mahanga	Sk. Matlub Ali	Indian National Congress (I)	
Cuttack	41	Salepur (SC)	Mayadhar Sethi	Indian National Congress (I)	
Cuttack	42	Gobindpur	Antarjyami Pradhan	Janata Party (Secular)	
Cuttack	43	Cuttack Sadar	Dolagobinda Pradhan	Indian National Congress (I)	
Cuttack	44	Cuttack City	Srikant Panda	Indian National Congress (I)	
Cuttack	45	Choudwar	Kahnu Charan Lenka	Indian National Congress (I)	
Cuttack	46	Banki	Akshaya Kumar Patnaik	Indian National Congress (I)	
Cuttack	47	Athgarh	Rasananda Sahoo	Indian National Congress (I)	Resigned on 7 October 1980.
Cuttack	47	Athgarh	Janaki Ballabh Patnaik	Indian National Congress (I)	Won in 1980 Bypoll. Chief Minister
Cuttack	48	Baramba	Samir Kumar Routray	Indian National Congress (I)	
Puri	49	Balipatna (SC)	Basanta Behera	Indian National Congress (I)	
Puri	50	Bhubaneswar	Rama Krushna Pati	Communist Party of India	
Puri	51	Jatni	Suresh Kumar Routray	Indian National Congress (I)	
Puri	52	Pipli	Bipin Das	Indian National Congress (I)	
Puri	53	Nimapara (SC)	Rabindra Kumar Sethy	Indian National Congress (I)	
Puri	54	Kakatpur	Baikunthanath Swain	Indian National Congress (I)	
Puri	55	Satyabadi	Rabindra Kumar Das	Indian National Congress (I)	
Puri	56	Puri	Gadadhar Mishra	Indian National Congress (I)	
Puri	57	Brahmagiri	Gangadhar Mohapatra	Indian National Congress (I)	
Puri	58	Chilka	Debendranath Mansingh	Indian National Congress (I)	
Puri	59	Khurda	Prasanna Kumar Patsani	Indian National Congress (I)	
Puri	60	Begunia	Kailash Chandra Mohapatra	Indian National Congress (I)	
Puri	61	Ranpur	Ramakant Mishra	Indian National Congress (I)	
Puri	62	Nayagarh	Bansidhara Sahoo	Indian National Congress (I)	
Puri	63	Khandapara	Bibhuti Bhusan Singh Mardraj	Independent	
Puri	64	Daspalla	Harihar Karan	Indian National Congress (I)	
Ganjam	65	Jaganathprasad (SC)	Sribaschha Naik	Indian National Congress (I)	
Ganjam	66	Bhanjanagar	Somnath Rath	Indian National Congress (I)	Speaker
Ganjam	67	Suruda	Gantayat Swain	Indian National Congress (I)	
Ganjam	68	Aska	Raghaba Parida	Indian National Congress (I)	
Ganjam	69	Kabisuryanagar	Radha Govinda Sahu	Indian National Congress (I)	
Ganjam	70	Kodala	Kanhu Charan Naik	Indian National Congress (I)	
Ganjam	71	Khallikote	Trinath Samantary	Indian National Congress (I)	
Ganjam	72	Chatrapur	Biswanath Sahu	Communist Party of India	
Ganjam	73	Hinjili	Brundaban Nayak	Janata Party (Secular)	
Ganjam	74	Gopalpur (SC)	Ghanashyam Behera	Indian National Congress (I)	
Ganjam	75	Berhampur	Krushna Charan Patnaik	Indian National Congress (I)	
Ganjam	76	Chikati	Chintamani Dyan Samatra	Independent	
Ganjam	77	Mohana	Udaya Narayan Dev	Janata Party (Secular)	
Ganjam	78	Ramagiri (ST)	Gorsanga Savara	Indian National Congress (I)	
Ganjam	79	Parlakhemundi	Bijoy Kumar Jena	Independent	
Koraput	80	Gunupur (ST)	Bhagirathi Gamango	Indian National Congress (I)	
Koraput	81	Bissam-cuttack (ST)	Dambarudhar Ulaka	Indian National Congress (I)	
Koraput	82	Rayagada (ST)	Ulaka Ramchandra	Indian National Congress (I)	
Koraput	83	Lakshmipur (ST)	Anantaram Majhi	Indian National Congress (I)	
Koraput	84	Pottangi (ST)	Chandrama Santa	Indian National Congress (I)	
Koraput	85	Koraput	Nrusinghananda Brahma	Indian National Congress (I)	
Koraput	86	Malkangiri (SC)	Naka Laxmayya	Indian National Congress (I)	
Koraput	87	Chitrakonda (ST)	Gangadhar Madi	Indian National Congress (I)	
Koraput	88	Kotpad (ST)	Basudev Majhi	Indian National Congress (I)	
Koraput	89	Jeypore	Raghunath Pattanaik	Indian National Congress (I)	
Koraput	90	Nowrangpur	Habibulla Khan	Indian National Congress (I)	
Koraput	91	Kodinga (ST)	Dombaru Majhi	Indian National Congress (I)	
Koraput	92	Dabugam (ST)	Phulamani Santa	Indian National Congress (I)	
Koraput	93	Umarkote (ST)	Parama Pujari	Indian National Congress (I)	
Kalahandi	94	Nawapara	Bhanu Prakash Joshi	Indian National Congress (I)	
Kalahandi	95	Khariar	Anup Singh Deo	Independent	
Kalahandi	96	Dharamgarh (SC)	Gajanan Nayak	Indian National Congress (I)	
Kalahandi	97	Koksara	Manmohan Mathur	Indian National Congress (I)	
Kalahandi	98	Junagarh	Maheswar Barad	Indian National Congress (I)	
Kalahandi	99	Bhawanipatna (SC)	Dayanidhi Naik	Indian National Congress (I)	
Kalahandi	100	Narla (ST)	Tejraj Majhi	Indian National Congress (I)	
Kalahandi	101	Kesinga	Bhupinder Singh	Indian National Congress (I)	
Phulabani	102	Balliguda (ST)	Sahura Mallik	Indian National Congress (I)	
Phulabani	103	Udayagiri (ST)	Nagarjun Pradhan	Indian National Congress (I)	
Phulabani	104	Phulbani (SC)	Chandra Sekhar Behera	Indian National Congress (I)	
Phulabani	105	Boudh	Himanshu Sekhar Padhi	Indian National Congress (I)	Deputy Speaker
Balangir	106	Titilagarh (SC)	Lalit Mohan Gandhi	Indian National Congress (I)	
Balangir	107	Kantabanji	Prasanna Kumar Pal	Indian National Congress (I)	
Balangir	108	Patnagarh	Brajamohan Thakur	Indian National Congress (I)	
Balangir	109	Saintala	Ramesh Chandra Singh Bhoi	Indian National Congress (I)	
Balangir	110	Loisingha	Balgopal Mishra	Independent	
Balangir	111	Bolangir	Mahammad Muzafar Hussain Khan	Indian National Congress (I)	
Balangir	112	Sonepur (SC)	Dhaneswar Kumbhar	Indian National Congress (I)	
Balangir	113	Binka	Pradipta Hota	Indian National Congress (I)	
Balangir	114	Birmaharajpur	Hrushikesh Hota	Indian National Congress (I)	
Dhenkanal	115	Athmallik	Bhajaman Behera	Indian National Congress (I)	
Dhenkanal	116	Angul	Santosh Kumar Pradhan	Indian National Congress (I)	
Dhenkanal	117	Hindol (SC)	Trinath Nayak	Janata Party (Secular)	
Dhenkanal	118	Dhenkanal	Nandini Satpathy	Indian National Congress (U)	
Dhenkanal	119	Gondia	Haldhar Mishra	Indian National Congress (U)	
Dhenkanal	120	Kamakhyanagar	Kailash Chandra Mohapatra	Indian National Congress (I)	
Dhenkanal	121	Pallahara	Bibhudhendra Pratap Das	Indian National Congress (I)	
Dhenkanal	122	Talcher (SC)	Brundaban Behera	Janata Party	
Sambalpur	123	Padampur	Satya Bhusan Sahu	Indian National Congress (I)	
Sambalpur	124	Melchhamunda	Prakash Chandra Debta	Indian National Congress (I)	
Sambalpur	125	Bijepur	Rajib Lochan Hota	Indian National Congress (I)	
Sambalpur	126	Bhatli (SC)	Mohan Nag	Indian National Congress (I)	
Sambalpur	127	Bargarh	Jadumani Pradhan	Indian National Congress (I)	
Sambalpur	128	Sambalpur	Aswini Kumar Guru	Indian National Congress (I)	
Sambalpur	129	Brajarajnagar	Upendra Dixit	Indian National Congress (I)	
Sambalpur	130	Jharsuguda	Birendra Pandey	Indian National Congress (I)	
Sambalpur	131	Laikera (ST)	Hemananda Biswal	Indian National Congress (I)	
Sambalpur	132	Kuchinda (ST)	Jagateswar Mirdha	Indian National Congress (I)	
Sambalpur	133	Rairakhol (SC)	Abhimanyu Kumar	Indian National Congress (I)	
Sambalpur	134	Deogarh	Aswini Kumar Behera	Indian National Congress (I)	
Sundergarh	135	Sundargarh	Kishore Chandra Patal	Indian National Congress (I)	
Sundergarh	136	Talsara (ST)	Gajadhar Majhi	Indian National Congress (I)	
Sundergarh	137	Rajgangpur (ST)	Mukharam Naik	Indian National Congress (I)	
Sundergarh	138	Biramitrapur (ST)	Jumus Bilung	Indian National Congress (I)	
Sundergarh	139	Rourkela	Gurupada Nanda	Indian National Congress (I)	
Sundergarh	140	Raghunathpali (ST)	Nelson Soreng	Indian National Congress (I)	
Sundergarh	141	Bonai (ST)	Basanta Kumar Dandapat	Indian National Congress (I)	
Keonjhar	142	Champua (ST)	Saharei Oram	Janata Party (Secular)	
Keonjhar	143	Patna	Hrushikesh Naik	Janata Party (Secular)	
Keonjhar	144	Keonjhar (ST)	Jogendra Naik	Indian National Congress (I)	
Keonjhar	145	Telkoi (ST)	Chandrasen Nayak	Indian National Congress (I)	
Keonjhar	146	Ramchandrapur	Niranjan Patnaik	Indian National Congress (I)	
Keonjhar	147	Anandapur (SC)	Jayadev Jena	Indian National Congress (I)	

== Bypolls ==
Source
Year	Constituency	Reason for by-poll	Winning candidate	Party
November 1980	Patkura	Resignation of Biju Patnaik	Bijoy Mohapatra	Janata Party (Secular)
November 1980	Athgarh	Resignation of Rasananda Sahoo	Janaki Ballabh Patnaik	Indian National Congress (I)
