= 1980 Orissa Legislative Assembly election =

1980 Assembly election in Odisha, India

1980 Odisha Legislative Assembly election
- May 31, 1980

All 147 seats in the Odisha Legislative Assembly 74 seats needed for a majority
- Registered: 1,39,09,115 (▲10.14%)
- Turnout: 47.08% (▲5.29pp)
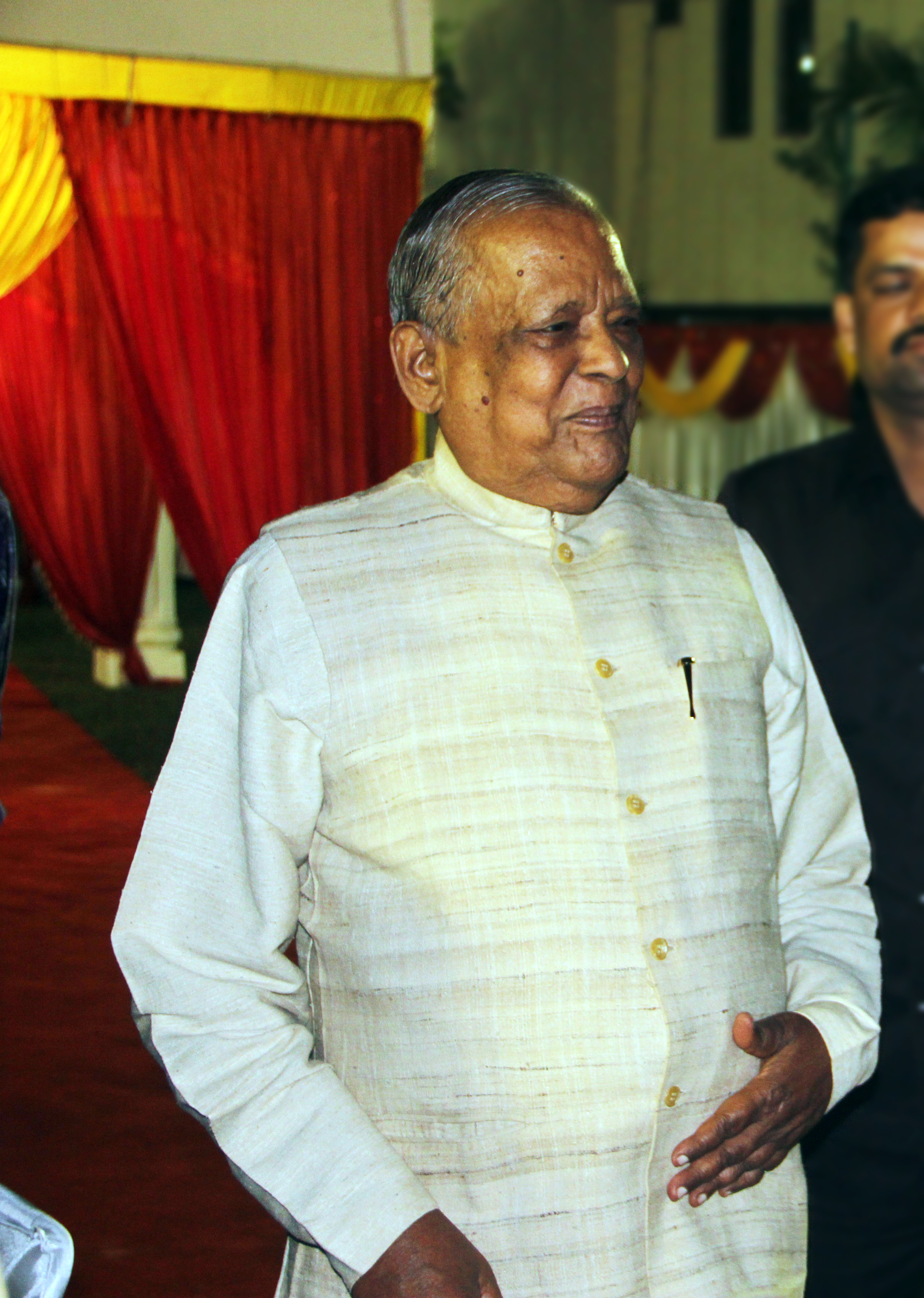

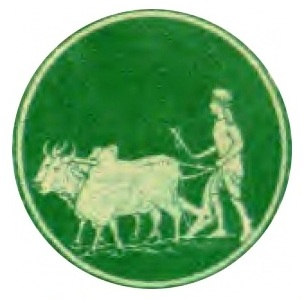
	Majority party	Minority party
Leader	Janaki Ballabh Patnaik	Sarat Kumar Deb
Party	Indian National Congress (I)	Janata Party (Secular)
Leader's seat	Athagarh	Aul
Seats won	118	13
Seat change	▲87	▼92
popular vote	30,37,487	12,38,745
Percentage	47.78	25.92
Chief Minister before election
Vacant
President's rule
Elected Chief Minister
Janaki Ballabh Patnaik
Congress(I)

Elections to the 8th Odisha Legislative Assembly were held 1980.

== Constituencies ==
The elections were held for 147 constituencies, of which 22 were reserved for Scheduled Castes, 34 for Scheduled Tribes and 91 unreserved.

== Contesting parties ==
There are eight national parties CPI, INC(I), INC(U), BJP, JNP, CPM, Charan Singh JNP(SC) and Raj Narain JNP(JP), Two state parties FBL and RSP, two registered unrecognised parties JKD and SUC and some Independent Politicians took part in this assembly election. Indian National Congress (I) emerged as the winner by winning 118 seats. Janaki Ballabh Patnaik became the Chief Minister and Sarata Deb (ଶରତ ଦେବ) became the Leader of Opposition in the 8th Orissa Assembly.

== Results ==
Source: Election Commission of India
Party				Popular vote			Seats		
Color	Flag	Name	Symbol	Votes	%	±pp	Contested	Won	+/−
		Indian National Congress (I)		3,037,487	47.78	▲16.76	147	118	▲92
		Janata Party (Secular)		1,238,745	19.49	(new)	110	13	(new)
	-	Indian National Congress (U)	-	446,818	7.03	(new)	98	2	(new)
		Communist Party of India		323,411	5.09	▲1.52	27	4	▲3
		Janata Party		262,903	4.14	▼45.03	31	3	▼107
	-	Independents	-	755,087	11.88	▼1.38	248	7	▼2
Total				-	100	-	-	147	-
Valid Votes				6,357,005	45.70				
Invalid Votes				192,069	-				
Total Votes polled / turnout				6,549,074	47.08				
Abstentation				7,360,041	-				
Total No. of Electors				13,909,115					

== Elected members ==
District	AC. No.	Constituency	Member	Party
Mayurbhanj	1	Karanjia (ST)	Raghunath Hembram	Janata Party (Secular)
Mayurbhanj	2	Jashipur (ST)	Sundar Mohan Majhi	Indian National Congress (I)
Mayurbhanj	3	Bahalda (ST)	Rama Chandra Hansdah	Indian National Congress (I)
Mayurbhanj	4	Rairangpur (ST)	Sidhalal Murmu	Indian National Congress (I)
Mayurbhanj	5	Bangriposi (ST)	Kangoi Singh	Indian National Congress (I)
Mayurbhanj	6	Kuliana (ST)	Saraswati Hembram	Indian National Congress (I)
Mayurbhanj	7	Baripada	Prasanna Kumar Dash	Indian National Congress (I)
Mayurbhanj	8	Baisinga (ST)	Kuanria Majhi	Indian National Congress (I)
Mayurbhanj	9	Khunta (ST)	Ramesh Soren	Indian National Congress (I)
Mayurbhanj	10	Udala (ST)	Rauaneswar Madhei	Indian National Congress (I)
Baleshwar	11	Bhograi	Kartikeswar Patra	Indian National Congress (I)
Baleshwar	12	Jaleswar	Gadadhar Giri	Janata Party
Baleshwar	13	Basta	Bhopal Chandra Mohapatra	Indian National Congress (I)
Baleshwar	14	Balasore	Arun Dey	Communist Party of India
Baleshwar	15	Soro	Pitambar Panda	Communist Party of India
Baleshwar	16	Simulia	Parsuram Panigrahi	Janata Party
Baleshwar	17	Nilgiri	Akshaya Kumar Acharya	Indian National Congress (I)
Baleshwar	18	Bhandaripokhari (SC)	Purusottam Sethi	Indian National Congress (I)
Baleshwar	19	Bhadrak	Jugal Kishore Pattanaik	Indian National Congress (I)
Baleshwar	20	Dhamnagar	Jagannath Rout	Indian National Congress (I)
Baleshwar	21	Chandbali (SC)	Netrananda Mallick	Indian National Congress (I)
Baleshwar	22	Basudevpur	Jagabandhu Das	Indian National Congress (I)
Cuttack	23	Sukinda	Sarat Rout	Indian National Congress (I)
Cuttack	24	Korai	Ashok Kumar Das	Janata Party (Secular)
Cuttack	25	Jajpur (SC)	Niranjan Jena	Indian National Congress (I)
Cuttack	26	Dharamsala	Kangali Panda	Independent
Cuttack	27	Barchana	Sitakanta Mohapatra	Indian National Congress (I)
Cuttack	28	Bari-Derabisi	Srikant Kumar Jena	Janata Party (Secular)
Cuttack	29	Binjharpur (SC)	Naba Kishore Mallik	Indian National Congress (I)
Cuttack	30	Aul	Sarat Deb	Janata Party (Secular)
Cuttack	31	Patamundai (SC)	Biswanath Mallik	Indian National Congress (I)
Cuttack	32	Rajnagar	Nalinikanta Mohanty	Janata Party (Secular)
Cuttack	33	Kendrapara	Indramani Rout	Indian National Congress (I)
Cuttack	34	Patkura	Biju Pattanaik	Janata Party (Secular)
Cuttack	35	Tirtol	Basant Kumar Biswal	Indian National Congress (I)
Cuttack	36	Ersama	Damodar Rout	Janata Party (Secular)
Cuttack	37	Balikuda	Basudeba Mohapatra	Indian National Congress (I)
Cuttack	38	Jagatsinghpur (SC)	Krushna Chandra Mallik	Indian National Congress (I)
Cuttack	39	Kissannagar	Surendranath Patnaik	Independent
Cuttack	40	Mahanga	Sk. Matlub Ali	Indian National Congress (I)
Cuttack	41	Salepur (SC)	Mayadhar Sethi	Indian National Congress (I)
Cuttack	42	Gobindpur	Antarjyami Pradhan	Janata Party (Secular)
Cuttack	43	Cuttack Sadar	Dolagobinda Pradhan	Indian National Congress (I)
Cuttack	44	Cuttack City	Srikant Panda	Indian National Congress (I)
Cuttack	45	Choudwar	Kahnu Charan Lenka	Indian National Congress (I)
Cuttack	46	Banki	Akshaya Kumar Patnaik	Indian National Congress (I)
Cuttack	47	Athgarh	Rasananda Sahoo	Indian National Congress (I)
Cuttack	48	Baramba	Samir Kumar Routray	Indian National Congress (I)
Puri	49	Balipatna (SC)	Basanta Behera	Indian National Congress (I)
Puri	50	Bhubaneswar	Rama Krushna Pati	Communist Party of India
Puri	51	Jatni	Suresh Kumar Routray	Indian National Congress (I)
Puri	52	Pipli	Bipin Das	Indian National Congress (I)
Puri	53	Nimapara (SC)	Rabindra Kumar Sethy	Indian National Congress (I)
Puri	54	Kakatpur	Baikunthanath Swain	Indian National Congress (I)
Puri	55	Satyabadi	Rabindra Kumar Das	Indian National Congress (I)
Puri	56	Puri	Gadadhar Mishra	Indian National Congress (I)
Puri	57	Brahmagiri	Gangadhar Mohapatra	Indian National Congress (I)
Puri	58	Chilka	Debendranath Mansingh	Indian National Congress (I)
Puri	59	Khurda	Prasanna Kumar Patsani	Indian National Congress (I)
Puri	60	Begunia	Kailash Chandra Mohapatra	Indian National Congress (I)
Puri	61	Ranpur	Ramakant Mishra	Indian National Congress (I)
Puri	62	Nayagarh	Bansidhara Sahoo	Indian National Congress (I)
Puri	63	Khandapara	Bibhuti Bhusan Singh Mardraj	Independent
Puri	64	Daspalla	Harihar Karan	Indian National Congress (I)
Ganjam	65	Jaganathprasad (SC)	Sribaschha Naik	Indian National Congress (I)
Ganjam	66	Bhanjanagar	Somanath Rath	Indian National Congress (I)
Ganjam	67	Suruda	Gantayat Swain	Indian National Congress (I)
Ganjam	68	Aska	Raghaba Parida	Indian National Congress (I)
Ganjam	69	Kabisuryanagar	Radha Govinda Sahu	Indian National Congress (I)
Ganjam	70	Kodala	Kanhu Charan Naik	Indian National Congress (I)
Ganjam	71	Khallikote	Trinath Samantary	Indian National Congress (I)
Ganjam	72	Chatrapur	Biswanath Sahu	Communist Party of India
Ganjam	73	Hinjili	Brundaban Nayak	Janata Party (Secular)
Ganjam	74	Gopalpur (SC)	Ghanashyam Behera	Indian National Congress (I)
Ganjam	75	Berhampur	Krushna Charan Patnaik	Indian National Congress (I)
Ganjam	76	Chikati	Chintamani Dyan Samatra	Independent
Ganjam	77	Mohana	Udaya Narayan Dev	Janata Party (Secular)
Ganjam	78	Ramagiri (ST)	Gorsanga Savara	Indian National Congress (I)
Ganjam	79	Parlakhemundi	Bijoy Kumar Jena	Independent
Koraput	80	Gunupur (ST)	Bhagirathi Gamango	Indian National Congress (I)
Koraput	81	Bissam-cuttack (ST)	Dambarudhar Ulaka	Indian National Congress (I)
Koraput	82	Rayagada (ST)	Ulaka Ramchandra	Indian National Congress (I)
Koraput	83	Lakshmipur (ST)	Anantaram Majhi	Indian National Congress (I)
Koraput	84	Pottangi (ST)	Chandrama Santa	Indian National Congress (I)
Koraput	85	Koraput	Nrusinghananda Brahma	Indian National Congress (I)
Koraput	86	Malkangiri (SC)	Naka Laxmayya	Indian National Congress (I)
Koraput	87	Chitrakonda (ST)	Gangadhar Madi	Indian National Congress (I)
Koraput	88	Kotpad (ST)	Basudev Majhi	Indian National Congress (I)
Koraput	89	Jeypore	Raghunath Pattanaik	Indian National Congress (I)
Koraput	90	Nowrangpur	Habibulla Khan	Indian National Congress (I)
Koraput	91	Kodinga (ST)	Dombaru Majhi	Indian National Congress (I)
Koraput	92	Dabugam (ST)	Phulamani Santa	Indian National Congress (I)
Koraput	93	Umarkote (ST)	Parama Pujari	Indian National Congress (I)
Kalahandi	94	Nawapara	Bhanu Prakash Joshi	Indian National Congress (I)
Kalahandi	95	Khariar	Anup Singh Deo	Independent
Kalahandi	96	Dharamgarh (SC)	Gajanan Nayak	Indian National Congress (I)
Kalahandi	97	Koksara	Manmohan Mathur	Indian National Congress (I)
Kalahandi	98	Junagarh	Maheswar Barad	Indian National Congress (I)
Kalahandi	99	Bhawanipatna (SC)	Dayanidhi Naik	Indian National Congress (I)
Kalahandi	100	Narla (ST)	Tejraj Majhi	Indian National Congress (I)
Kalahandi	101	Kesinga	Bhupinder Singh	Indian National Congress (I)
Phulabani	102	Balliguda (ST)	Sahura Mallik	Indian National Congress (I)
Phulabani	103	Udayagiri (ST)	Nagarjun Pradhan	Indian National Congress (I)
Phulabani	104	Phulbani (SC)	Chandra Sekhar Behera	Indian National Congress (I)
Phulabani	105	Boudh	Himanshu Sekhar Pandhi	Indian National Congress (I)
Balangir	106	Titilagarh (SC)	Lalit Mohan Gandhi	Indian National Congress (I)
Balangir	107	Kantabanji	Prasanna Kumar Pal	Indian National Congress (I)
Balangir	108	Patnagarh	Brajamohan Thakur	Indian National Congress (I)
Balangir	109	Saintala	Ramesh Chandra Singh Bhoi	Indian National Congress (I)
Balangir	110	Loisingha	Balgopal Mishra	Independent
Balangir	111	Bolangir	Mahammad Muzafar Hussain Khan	Indian National Congress (I)
Balangir	112	Sonepur (SC)	Dhaneswar Kumbhar	Indian National Congress (I)
Balangir	113	Binka	Pradipta Hota	Indian National Congress (I)
Balangir	114	Birmaharajpur	Hrushikesh Hota	Indian National Congress (I)
Dhenkanal	115	Athmallik	Bhajaman Behera	Indian National Congress (I)
Dhenkanal	116	Angul	Santosh Kumar Pradhan	Indian National Congress (I)
Dhenkanal	117	Hindol (SC)	Trinath Nayak	Janata Party (Secular)
Dhenkanal	118	Dhenkanal	Nandini Satpathy	Indian National Congress (U)
Dhenkanal	119	Gondia	Haldhar Mishra	Indian National Congress (U)
Dhenkanal	120	Kamakhyanagar	Kailash Chandra Mohapatra	Indian National Congress (I)
Dhenkanal	121	Pallahara	Bibhudhendra Pratap Das	Indian National Congress (I)
Dhenkanal	122	Talcher (SC)	Brundaban Behera	Janata Party
Sambalpur	123	Padampur	Satya Bhusan Sahu	Indian National Congress (I)
Sambalpur	124	Melchhamunda	Prakash Chandra Debta	Indian National Congress (I)
Sambalpur	125	Bijepur	Rajib Lochan Hota	Indian National Congress (I)
Sambalpur	126	Bhatli (SC)	Mohan Nag	Indian National Congress (I)
Sambalpur	127	Bargarh	Jadumani Pradhan	Indian National Congress (I)
Sambalpur	128	Sambalpur	Aswini Kumar Guru	Indian National Congress (I)
Sambalpur	129	Brajarajnagar	Upendra Dixit	Indian National Congress (I)
Sambalpur	130	Jharsuguda	Birendra Pandey	Indian National Congress (I)
Sambalpur	131	Laikera (ST)	Hemananda Biswal	Indian National Congress (I)
Sambalpur	132	Kuchinda (ST)	Jagateswar Mirdha	Indian National Congress (I)
Sambalpur	133	Rairakhol (SC)	Abhimanyu Kumar	Indian National Congress (I)
Sambalpur	134	Deogarh	Aswini Kumar Behera	Indian National Congress (I)
Sundergarh	135	Sundargarh	Kishore Chandra Patal	Indian National Congress (I)
Sundergarh	136	Talsara (ST)	Gajadhar Majhi	Indian National Congress (I)
Sundergarh	137	Rajgangpur (ST)	Mukharam Naik	Indian National Congress (I)
Sundergarh	138	Biramitrapur (ST)	Jumus Bilung	Indian National Congress (I)
Sundergarh	139	Rourkela	Gurupada Nanda	Indian National Congress (I)
Sundergarh	140	Raghunathpali (ST)	Nelson Soreng	Indian National Congress (I)
Sundergarh	141	Bonai (ST)	Basanta Kumar Dandapat	Indian National Congress (I)
Keonjhar	142	Champua (ST)	Saharei Oram	Janata Party (Secular)
Keonjhar	143	Patna	Hrushikesh Naik	Janata Party (Secular)
Keonjhar	144	Keonjhar (ST)	Jogendra Naik	Indian National Congress (I)
Keonjhar	145	Telkoi (ST)	Chandrasen Nayak	Indian National Congress (I)
Keonjhar	146	Ramchandrapur	Niranjan Patnaik	Indian National Congress (I)
Keonjhar	147	Anandapur (SC)	Jayadev Jena/	Indian National Congress (I)
