= First Janaki Ballabh Patnaik ministry =

Government of Odisha (1980 – 1985)

- 18th Ministry of Orissa
- 1980 – 1985
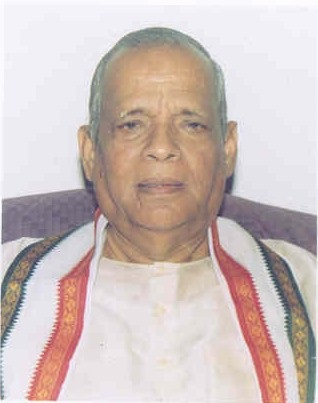
- Janaki Ballabh Patnaik; Hon'ble Chief Minister of Orissa
- Date formed: 9 June 1980
- Date dissolved: 10 March 1985

People and organisations
- Governor: C. M. Poonacha; Justice Sukanta Kishore Ray (acting); C. M. Poonacha; Justice Ranganath Misra (acting); C. M. Poonacha; Bishambhar Nath Pande
- Chief Minister: Janaki Ballabh Patnaik
- No. of ministers: 19
- Member parties: Indian National Congress (I)
- Status in legislature: Majority
- Opposition party: No Official Opposition (1980 – 1984); Janata Party (Secular) (1984 – 1985)
- Opposition leader: Vacant (1980 – 1984); Sarat Kumar Deb (1984 – 1985)

History
- Incoming formation: 8th Orissa Legislative Assembly
- Outgoing formation: 7th Orissa Legislative Assembly
- Election: 1980 Assembly election
- Legislature terms: 4 years, 274 days
- Predecessor: Nilamani Routray ministry
- Successor: Second Janaki Ballabh Patnaik ministry

Janaki Ballabh Patnaik was elected for the first time as the chief minister of Orissa following Indian National Congress (I) party's victory in 1980 Orissa Legislative Assembly election.

== Brief history ==
Following Cong (I) victory in 1980 Indian general election, Opposition led state govt were dismissed and early election were called. Dissatisfied with Janata Govt., Cong (I) was voted to power in 1980 Orissa Assembly election. Chief Minister Janaki Ballabh Patnaik along with 7 Cabinet ministers, 10 Ministers of state and 1 deputy minister were administered the oath of office and secrecy by Governor C. M. Poonacha at the Raj Bhavan, Bhubaneswar on 9 June 1980.

Ministry was further expanded on 14 July 1981 & 10 February 1984.

Following Cong win in 1985 Orissa Assembly election due to the sympathy wave created by the unfortunate death of Indira Gandhi, Chief Minister Janaki Patnaik resigned on 10 March 1985.

== Council of Ministers ==
Source
Portfolio	Portrait	Name Constituency	Tenure		Party
Chief Minister; Home; General Administration; Planning & Coordination; Industries; Information & Public Relations; Irrigation & Power; Other departments not allocated to any Minister.		Janaki Ballabh Patnaik; MLA from Athgarh	9 June 1980	10 March 1985	INC(I)
Science & Technology; Environment; Tourism; Culture		Janaki Ballabh Patnaik; MLA from Athgarh	9 June 1980	14 July 1981	INC(I)
Community Development & Rural Reconstruction		Janaki Ballabh Patnaik; MLA from Athgarh	14 April 1982	10 February 1984	INC(I)
Science & Technology; Environment; Sports; Culture		Janaki Ballabh Patnaik; MLA from Athgarh	10 February 1984	10 March 1985	INC(I)
Agriculture		Janaki Ballabh Patnaik; MLA from Athgarh	31 December 1984	10 March 1985	INC(I)
Co-operation; Finance; Law		Janaki Ballabh Patnaik; MLA from Athgarh	12 February 1985	10 March 1985	INC(I)
Cabinet Minister
Education & Youth Services		Gangadhar Mohapatra; MLA from Brahmagiri	9 June 1980	10 March 1985	INC(I)
Harijan & Tribal Welfare		Ulaka Rama Chandra; MLA from Rayagada	9 June 1980	10 March 1985	INC(I)
Finance		Raghunath Patnaik; MLA from Jeypore	9 June 1980	12 February 1985	INC(I)
Law		Raghunath Patnaik; MLA from Jeypore	14 July 1981	12 February 1985	INC(I)
Agriculture; Co-operation		Basudev Mahapatra; MLA from Balikuda	9 June 1980	10 February 1984	INC(I)
Agriculture		Somanath Rath; MLA from Bhanjanagar	10 February 1984	31 December 1984	INC(I)
Food & Civil Supplies		Upendra Dikshit; MLA from Brajarajnagar	9 June 1980	14 July 1981	INC(I)
Works		Dayanidhi Naik; MLA from Bhawanipatna	9 June 1980	14 July 1981	INC(I)
Excise; Revenue		Kanhu Charan Lenka; MLA from Choudwar	9 June 1980	14 July 1981	INC(I)
Revenue; Transport		Upendra Dikshit; MLA from Brajarajnagar	14 July 1981	10 February 1984	INC(I)
Revenue; Transport		Basudev Mahapatra; MLA from Balikuda	10 February 1984	10 March 1985	INC(I)
Commerce		Dayanidhi Naik; MLA from Bhawanipatna	14 July 1981	10 February 1984	INC(I)
Commerce		Upendra Dikshit; MLA from Brajarajnagar	10 February 1984	10 March 1985	INC(I)
Labour & Employment		Upendra Dikshit; MLA from Brajarajnagar	10 February 1984	10 March 1985	INC(I)
Minister of State
Irrigation & Power		Niranjan Patnaik; MLA from Ramchandrapur	9 June 1980	10 March 1985	INC(I)
Industries		Kishore Chandra Patel; MLA from Sundargarh	9 June 1980	10 March 1985	INC(I)
Housing & Urban Development; Mines & Geology		Basanta Kumar Biswal; MLA from Tirtol	9 June 1980	10 March 1985	INC(I)
Works		Basanta Kumar Biswal; MLA from Tirtol	14 July 1981	10 March 1985	INC(I)
Sports		Basanta Kumar Biswal; MLA from Tirtol	21 February 1984	10 March 1985	INC(I)
Health & Family Welfare		Harihar Karan; MLA from Daspalla	9 June 1980	11 February 1984	INC(I)
Health & Family Welfare		Jugal Kishore Pattanayak; MLA from Bhadrak	11 February 1984	10 March 1985	INC(I)
Forest; Fisheries & Animal Husbandry		Kuanria Majhi; MLA from Baisinga	9 June 1980	11 February 1984	INC(I)
Forest; Fisheries & Animal Husbandry		Harihar Karan; MLA from Daspalla	11 February 1984	10 March 1985	INC(I)
Labour & Employment; Sports; Tourism; Culture		Jugal Kishore Pattanayak; MLA from Bhadrak	9 June 1980	11 February 1984	INC(I)
Law; Commerce and Transport		Krushna Chandra Patnaik; MLA from Berhampur	9 June 1980	14 July 1981	INC(I)
Information & Public Relations		Lalit Mohan Gandhi; MLA from Titilagarh	9 June 1980	14 July 1981	INC(I)
Planning & Coordination		Lalit Mohan Gandhi; MLA from Titilagarh	9 June 1980	10 February 1984	INC(I)
Agriculture; Co-operation		Habibulla Khan; MLA from Nowrangpur	9 June 1980	14 July 1981	INC(I)
Excise		Habibulla Khan; MLA from Nowrangpur	14 July 1981	10 March 1985	INC(I)
Community Development & Rural Reconstruction		Bhajaman Behara; MLA from Talcher	9 June 1980	14 July 1981	INC(I)
Community Development & Rural Reconstruction		Krushna Chandra Patnaik; MLA from Berhampur	14 July 1981	14 April 1982	INC(I)
Community Development & Rural Reconstruction		Bhajaman Behara; MLA from Talcher	11 February 1984	10 March 1985	INC(I)
Food & Civil Supplies		Bhajaman Behara; MLA from Talcher	14 July 1981	11 February 1984	INC(I)
Food & Civil Supplies		Kishore Chandra Patel; MLA from Sundargarh	11 February 1984	10 March 1985	INC(I)
Co-operation		Kuanria Majhi; MLA from Baisinga	11 February 1984	12 February 1985	INC(I)
Deputy Minister
Community Development & Rural Reconstruction		Saraswati Hembram; MLA from Kuliana	9 June 1980	9 March 1985	INC(I)

== Demographics ==
Division	District	Ministers	Cabinet Ministers	Ministers of State / Deputy Ministers
Central	Cuttack	4	Janaki Ballabh Patnaik (Chief Minister); Basudev Mahapatra; Kanhu Charan Lenka	Basanta Kumar Biswal
Central	Puri	2	Gangadhar Mohapatra	Harihar Karan
Central	Balasore	1	–	Jugal Kishore Pattanayak
Central	Mayurbhanj	2	–	Kuanria Majhi; Saraswati Hembram
Northern	Sambalpur	1	Upendra Dikshit	–
Northern	Sundergarh	1	–	Kishore Chandra Patel
Northern	Keonjhar	1	–	Niranjan Patnaik
Northern	Dhenkanal	1	–	Bhajaman Behara
Northern	Balangir	1	–	Lalit Mohan Gandhi
Southern	Ganjam	2	Somanath Rath	Krushna Chandra Patnaik
Southern	Kalahandi	1	Dayanidhi Naik	–
Southern	Koraput	3	Ulaka Rama Chandra; Raghunath Patnaik	Habibulla Khan
Southern	Phulbani	0	–	–
