= Second Janaki Ballabh Patnaik ministry =

Government of Odisha (1985 – 1990)

- 19th Ministry of Orissa
- 1985 – 1989
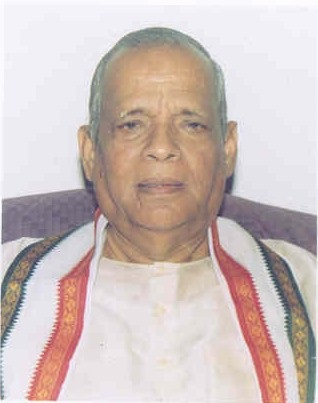
- Janaki Ballabh Patnaik; Hon'ble Chief Minister of Orissa
- Date formed: 10 March 1985
- Date dissolved: 7 December 1989

People and organisations
- Governor: Bishambhar Nath Pande; Saiyid Nurul Hasan
- Chief Minister: Janaki Ballabh Patnaik
- No. of ministers: 27
- Member parties: Indian National Congress
- Status in legislature: Majority
- Opposition party: Janata Party
- Opposition leader: Biju Patnaik

History
- Incoming formation: 9th Orissa Legislative Assembly
- Outgoing formation: 8th Orissa Legislative Assembly
- Election: 1985 Assembly election
- Legislature terms: 4 years, 272 days
- Predecessor: First Janaki Ballabh Patnaik ministry
- Successor: First Hemananda Biswal ministry

Janaki Ballabh Patnaik was elected as the chief minister of Orissa following Indian National Congress party's victory in 1985 Orissa Legislative Assembly election.

== Brief history ==
Riding on the sympathy wave, after the death of Indira Gandhi, Chief Minister Janaki Ballabh Patnaik won the reelection of 1985 Orissa Assembly election. He along with 5 Cabinet Ministers and 9 Minister of State were administered the oath of office and secrecy by Governor Bishambhar Nath Pande at the Raj Bhavan, Bhubaneswar on 10 March 1985.

Ministry was further expanded on 30 May 1985 & 22 July 1986.

Following poor performance of Congress party in the 1989 Lok Sabha elections, Shri Patnaik stepped down as CM taking moral responsibility on 7 December 1989. On Same day, Shri Hemananda Biswal was sworn in as Chief Minister.

== Council of Ministers ==
Source
Portfolio	Portrait	Name Constituency	Tenure		Party
Chief Minister; Home; General Administration; Planning & Coordination; Other departments not allocated to any Minister.		Janaki Ballabh Patnaik; MLA from Athgarh	10 March 1985	7 December 1989	INC
Finance		Janaki Ballabh Patnaik; MLA from Athgarh	10 March 1985	30 May 1985	INC
Science & Technology; Environment; Industries; Information & Public Relations; Sports; Works; Mines & Geology; Irrigation & Power; Housing & Urban Development		Janaki Ballabh Patnaik; MLA from Athgarh	10 March 1985	22 July 1986	INC
Revenue		Janaki Ballabh Patnaik; MLA from Athgarh	30 April 1985	30 May 1985	INC
Tourism; Culture		Janaki Ballabh Patnaik; MLA from Athgarh	30 May 1985	19 December 1986	INC
Administrative Reforms, Training Co-ordination & Public Grievances		Janaki Ballabh Patnaik; MLA from Athgarh	23 August 1985	7 December 1989	INC
Fisheries & Animal Husbandry		Janaki Ballabh Patnaik; MLA from Athgarh	22 July 1986	7 December 1989	INC
Finance; Harijan & Tribal Welfare; Health & Family Welfare		Janaki Ballabh Patnaik; MLA from Athgarh	19 December 1986	6 February 1987	INC
Commerce and Transport		Janaki Ballabh Patnaik; MLA from Athgarh	18 October 1989	7 December 1989	INC
Cabinet Minister
Commerce and Transport		Anupa Singh Deo; MLA from Khariar	10 March 1985	22 July 1986	INC
Labour & Employment		Anupa Singh Deo; MLA from Khariar	30 May 1985	22 July 1986	INC
Harijan & Tribal Welfare		Bhajaman Behara; MLA from Talcher	10 March 1985	19 December 1986	INC
Tourism; Culture		Gangadhar Mohapatra; MLA from Brahmagiri	10 March 1985	30 May 1985	INC
Law		Gangadhar Mohapatra; MLA from Brahmagiri	10 March 1985	19 December 1986	INC
Finance		Gangadhar Mohapatra; MLA from Brahmagiri	30 May 1985	19 December 1986	INC
Education & Youth Services		Jugal Kishore Pattanayak; MLA from Bhadrak	10 March 1985	30 May 1985	INC
Education & Youth Services		Jadunath Das Mohapatra; MLA from Soro	30 May 1985	7 December 1989	INC
Sports		Jadunath Das Mohapatra; MLA from Soro	22 July 1986	7 December 1989	INC
Revenue		Niranjan Patnaik; MLA from Ramchandrapur	10 March 1985	30 April 1985	INC
Revenue		Jugal Kishore Pattanayak; MLA from Bhadrak	30 May 1985	7 December 1989	INC
Law		Jugal Kishore Pattanayak; MLA from Bhadrak	19 December 1986	7 December 1989	INC
Finance		Jugal Kishore Pattanayak; MLA from Bhadrak	6 February 1987	7 December 1989	INC
Food & Civil Supplies		Harihar Karan; MLA from Daspalla	22 July 1986	7 December 1989	INC
Irrigation & Power		Sk. Matlub Ali; MLA from Mahanga	22 July 1986	7 December 1989	INC
Parliamentary Affairs in General Administration		Sk. Matlub Ali; MLA from Mahanga	1 September 1986	7 December 1989	INC
Science & Technology; Industries		Niranjan Patnaik; MLA from Ramchandrapur	22 July 1986	7 December 1989	INC
Health & Family Welfare		Niranjan Patnaik; MLA from Ramchandrapur	6 February 1987	7 December 1989	INC
Agriculture		Ras Bihari Behera; MLA from Koksara	22 July 1986	7 December 1989	INC
Harijan & Tribal Welfare; Co-operation		Ras Bihari Behera; MLA from Koksara	6 February 1987	7 December 1989	INC
Minister of State
Community Development & Rural Reconstruction		Batakrushna Jena; MLA from Kissannagar	10 March 1985	22 July 1986	INC
Community Development & Rural Reconstruction		Habibulla Khan; MLA from Nowrangpur	22 July 1986	7 December 1989	INC
Forest		Bhupal Chandra Mohapatra; MLA from Basta	13 March 1985	22 July 1986	INC
Forest; Environment		Dambarudhara Ulaka; MLA from Bissam-cuttack	22 July 1986	7 December 1989	INC
Excise		Dambarudhara Ulaka; MLA from Bissam-cuttack	10 March 1985	30 May 1985	INC
Excise		Nagarjuna Pradhan; MLA from Udayagiri	30 May 1985	7 December 1989	INC
Fisheries & Animal Husbandry		Frida Topno; MLA from Raghunathpali	10 March 1985	22 July 1986	INC
Food & Civil Supplies		Habibulla Khan; MLA from Nowrangpur	10 March 1985	22 July 1986	INC
Health & Family Welfare		Hemananda Biswal; MLA from Laikera	10 March 1985	19 December 1986	INC
Labour & Employment		Mahmmed Muzafar Hussain Khan; MLA from Bolangir	10 March 1985	30 May 1985	INC
Labour & Employment		Bhupal Chandra Mohapatra; MLA from Basta	22 July 1986	7 December 1989	INC
Works		Mahmmed Muzafar Hussain Khan; MLA from Bolangir	30 May 1985	7 December 1989	INC
Housing		Mahmmed Muzafar Hussain Khan; MLA from Bolangir	22 July 1986	7 December 1989	INC
Irrigation		Mohan Nag; MLA from Bhatli	10 March 1985	22 July 1986	INC
Mines & Geology		Mohan Nag; MLA from Bhatli	22 July 1986	7 December 1989	INC
Co-operation		Nagarjuna Pradhan; MLA from Udayagiri	10 March 1985	30 May 1985	INC
Co-operation		Sarat Chandra Panda; MLA from Suruda	30 May 1985	22 July 1986	INC
Agriculture		Sarat Chandra Panda; MLA from Suruda	10 March 1985	22 July 1986	INC
Commerce and Transport; Fisheries & Animal Husbandry		Sarat Chandra Panda; MLA from Suruda	22 July 1986	18 October 1989	INC
Housing & Urban Development		Dambarudhara Ulaka; MLA from Bissam-cuttack	30 May 1985	22 July 1986	INC
Urban Development		Batakrushna Jena; MLA from Kissannagar	22 July 1986	7 December 1989	INC
Information & Public Relations		Sarat Rout; MLA from Sukinda	30 May 1985	22 July 1986	INC
Information & Public Relations		Bhupinder Singh; MLA from Kesinga	22 July 1986	7 December 1989	INC
Irrigation & Power		Bhupinder Singh; MLA from Kesinga	22 July 1986	7 December 1989	INC
Planning & Coordination		Sarat Rout; MLA from Sukinda	30 May 1985	7 December 1989	INC
Tourism; Culture		Sarat Rout; MLA from Sukinda	22 July 1986	7 December 1989	INC
Education & Youth Services; Sports		Frida Topno; MLA from Raghunathpali	22 July 1986	7 December 1989	INC
Deputy Minister
Harijan & Tribal Welfare		Parama Pujari; MLA from Umarkote	22 July 1986	7 December 1989	INC
Community Development & Rural Reconstruction		Saraswati Hembram; MLA from Kuliana	22 July 1986	7 December 1989	INC

== Demographics ==
Division	District	Ministers	Cabinet Ministers	Ministers of State / Deputy Ministers
Central	Cuttack	4	Janaki Ballabh Patnaik (Chief Minister); Sk. Matlub Ali	Batakrushna Jena; Sarat Rout
Central	Puri	2	Gangadhar Mohapatra; Harihar Karan	–
Central	Balasore	3	Jugal Kishore Pattanayak; Jadunath Das Mohapatra	Bhupal Chandra Mohapatra
Central	Mayurbhanj	1	–	Saraswati Hembram
Northern	Sambalpur	2	–	Hemananda Biswal; Mohan Nag
Northern	Sundergarh	1	–	Frida Topno
Northern	Keonjhar	2	Niranjan Patnaik	Jayadev Jena
Northern	Dhenkanal	1	Bhajaman Behara	–
Northern	Balangir	1	–	Mahmmed Muzafar Hussain Khan
Southern	Ganjam	1	–	Sarat Chandra Panda
Southern	Kalahandi	3	Anupa Singh Deo; Ras Behari Behera	Bhupinder Singh
Southern	Koraput	3	–	Habibulla Khan; Dambarudhara Ulaka; Parama Pujari
Southern	Phulbani	1	–	Nagarjuna Pradhan
