= Binayak Acharya ministry =

Government of Odisha (1976 – 1977)

- 16th Ministry of Orissa
- 1976 – 1977
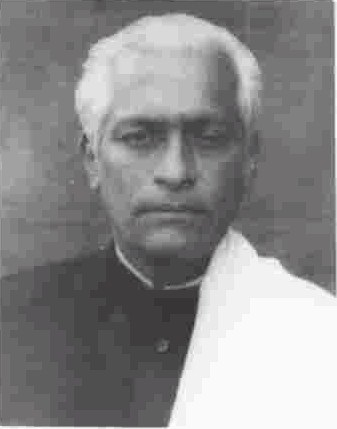
- Binayak Acharya; Hon'ble Chief Minister of Orissa
- Date formed: 29 December 1976
- Date dissolved: 30 April 1977

People and organisations
- Governor: Justice Siba Narain Sankar (acting); Harcharan Singh Brar
- Chief Minister: Binayak Acharya
- No. of ministers: 14
- Member parties: Indian National Congress (R)
- Status in legislature: Minority
- Opposition party: Bharatiya Lok Dal (1976 – 1977); Janata Party (1977)
- Opposition leader: Biju Patnaik (1976 – 1977); Ram Prasad Mishra (1977)

History
- Incoming formation: 6th Orissa Legislative Assembly
- Election: 1974 Assembly election
- Legislature term: 122 days
- Predecessor: Second Nandini Satpathy ministry
- Successor: Nilamani Routray ministry

Binayak Acharya was sworn in for the first time as the chief minister of Orissa following lifting of President's Rule in 1976.

== Brief history ==
Following Cong (R) narrow victory in 1974 Orissa Assembly election Smt. Nandini Satpathy was sworn into office on 6 March 1974. Due to rising unpopularity and unhappy with her style of functioning, Cong (R) MLAs forced Smt. Satpathy to resign on 16 December 1976. The State was placed under President's rule with the Assembly being kept under suspended animation. On 29 December 1976, President's rule was lifted of and Shri Binayak Acharya along with 8 Cabinet ministers, 4 Ministers of state and 1 deputy minister were administered the oath of office and secrecy by Governor Siba Narain Sankar at the Raj Bhavan, Bhubaneswar.

Following lifting of Emergency and subsequent Janata Party's landslide win in 1977 Indian general election, Congress ruled state govt were dismissed. Shri Acharya tendered his resignation on 30 April 1977.

== Council of Ministers ==
Source
Portfolio	Portrait	Name Constituency	Tenure		Party
Chief Minister; Home; Political and Services; Finance; Planning & Coordination; Tribal & Rural Welfare; Other departments not allocated to any Minister.		Binayak Acharya; MLA from Berhampur	29 December 1976	30 April 1977	INC(R)
Cabinet Minister
Revenue; Irrigation & Power; Law; Education & Youth Services		Sriballav Panigrahi; MLA from Sambalpur	29 December 1976	30 April 1977	INC(R)
Food & Civil Supplies		Ulaka Rama Chandra; MLA from Rayagada	29 December 1976	30 April 1977	INC(R)
Works; Transport		Laxman Mallick; MLA from Jagatsinghpur	29 December 1976	30 April 1977	INC(R)
Community Development & Social Welfare; Urban Development		Mohan Nayak; MLA from Gopalpur	29 December 1976	30 April 1977	INC(R)
Industries; Commerce		Kanhu Charan Lenka; MLA from Choudwar	29 December 1976	30 April 1977	INC(R)
Excise; Labour & Employment; Housing		Benudhar Baliarsingh; MLA from Khurda	29 December 1976	30 April 1977	INC(R)
Health & Family Planning		Bhagirathi Gomango; MLA from Gunupur	29 December 1976	30 April 1977	INC(R)
Agriculture; Co-operation		Jogesh Chandra Rout; MLA from Banki	29 December 1976	30 April 1977	INC(R)
Minister of State
Finance; Planning & Coordination; Mines & Geology		Jagannath Pattanaik; MLA from Nawapara	29 December 1976	30 April 1977	INC(R)
Revenue; Education & Youth Services; Tourism; Culture		Sk. Matlub Ali; MLA from Mahanga	29 December 1976	30 April 1977	INC(R)
Forest; Fisheries & Animal Husbandry		Ananga Udaya Singh Deo; MLA from Loisingha	29 December 1976	30 April 1977	SWA
Rural Development; Tribal & Rural Welfare		Bhajaman Behara; MLA from Athmallik	29 December 1976	30 April 1977	INC(R)
Deputy Minister
Health & Family Planning		Mohan Nag; MLA from Bhatli	29 December 1976	30 April 1977	INC(R)

== Demographics ==
Division	District	Ministers	Cabinet Ministers	Ministers of State / Deputy Ministers
Central	Cuttack	4	Laxman Mallick; Kanhu Charan Lenka; Jogesh Chandra Rout	Sk. Matlub Ali
Central	Puri	1	Benudhar Baliarsingh	–
Central	Balasore	0	–	–
Central	Mayurbhanj	0	–	–
Northern	Sambalpur	2	Sriballav Panigrahi	Mohan Nag
Northern	Sundergarh	0	–	–
Northern	Keonjhar	0	–	–
Northern	Dhenkanal	1	–	Bhajaman Behara
Northern	Balangir	1	–	Ananga Udaya Singh Deo
Southern	Ganjam	2	Binayak Acharya (Chief Minister); Mohan Nayak	–
Southern	Kalahandi	1	–	Jagannath Pattanaik
Southern	Koraput	2	Ulaka Rama Chandra; Bhagirathi Gomango	–
Southern	Phulbani	0	–	–
