= Nilamani Routray ministry =

Government of Odisha (1977 – 1980)

- 17th Ministry of Orissa
- 1977 – 1980
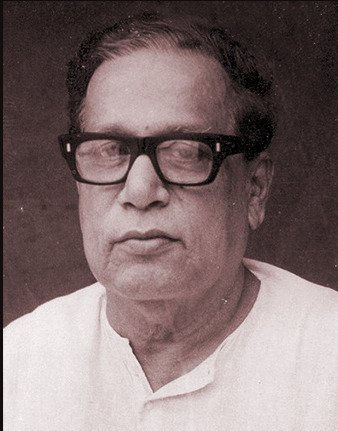
- Nilamani Routray; Hon'ble Chief Minister of Orissa
- Date formed: 26 June 1977
- Date dissolved: 17 February 1980

People and organisations
- Governor: Harcharan Singh Brar; Bhagwat Dayal Sharma
- Chief Minister: Nilamani Routray
- No. of ministers: 25
- Member parties: Janata Party
- Status in legislature: Majority
- Opposition party: Indian National Congress (Requisitionists); Janata Party
- Opposition leader: Chintamani Panigrahi (1977 – 1978); Brundaban Nayak (1978 – 1979); Prahlad Mallik (1979 – 1980); Ananta Narayan Singh Deo (1980)

History
- Incoming formation: 7th Orissa Legislative Assembly
- Outgoing formation: 6th Orissa Legislative Assembly
- Election: 1977 Assembly election
- Legislature terms: 2 years, 236 days
- Predecessor: Binayak Acharya ministry
- Successor: First Janaki Ballabh Patnaik ministry

Nilamani Routray was elected for the first time as the chief minister of Orissa following Janata Party's victory in 1977 Orissa Legislative Assembly election.

== Brief history ==
Following lifting of emergency and subsequent victory of Janata Party in 1977 Indian general election, Congress led state govt were dismissed and early election were called. Dissatisfied with Cong Govt., Janata Party was voted to power in 1977 Orissa Assembly election. Chief Minister Nilamani Routray along with 8 Cabinet ministers and 6 Ministers of state were administered the oath of office and secrecy by Governor Harcharan Singh Brar at the Raj Bhavan, Bhubaneswar on 26 June 1977.

Ministry was further expanded on 25 October 1979.

Following Cong win in 1980 Indian general election, Opposition led state govt were dismissed and early election were called. Shri Routray submitted his resignation to the governor on 17 February 1980.

== Council of Ministers ==
Source
Portfolio	Portrait	Name Constituency	Tenure		Party
Chief Minister; Home; Planning & Coordination; Political & Services (till 1979); Political & Services (except Parliamentary Affairs) (after 1979); Other departments not allocated to any Minister.		Nilamani Routray; MLA from Basudevpur	26 June 1977	17 February 1980	JP
Information & Public Relations; Labour & Employment; Housing		Nilamani Routray; MLA from Basudevpur	25 October 1979	17 February 1980	JP
Cabinet Minister
Revenue; Lift Irrigation & Power in Irrigation & Power		Pratap Chandra Mohanty; MLA from Tirtol	26 June 1977	17 February 1980	JP
Commerce		Pratap Chandra Mohanty; MLA from Tirtol	26 June 1977	25 October 1979	JP
Commerce		Bed Prakash Agarwal; MLA from Kendrapara	25 October 1979	17 February 1980	JP
Education & Youth Services		Pradipta Kishore Das; MLA from Mahanga	26 June 1977	25 October 1979	JP
Education & Youth Services		Pratap Chandra Mohanty; MLA from Tirtol	25 October 1979	17 February 1980	JP
Health & Family Welfare		Pradipta Kishore Das; MLA from Mahanga	26 June 1977	25 October 1979	JP
Health & Family Welfare		Ghasiram Majhi; MLA from Nawapara	25 October 1979	17 February 1980	JP
Agriculture; Co-operation		Prahlad Mallik; MLA from Patkura	26 June 1977	25 October 1979	JP
Agriculture; Co-operation		Jagannath Mallik; MLA from Jajpur	25 October 1979	17 February 1980	JP
Tribal & Rural Welfare		Prahlad Mallik; MLA from Patkura	26 June 1977	25 October 1979	JP
Tribal & Rural Welfare		Ghasiram Majhi; MLA from Nawapara	25 October 1979	17 February 1980	JP
Irrigation in Irrigation & Power		Prahlad Mallik; MLA from Patkura	26 June 1977	25 October 1979	JP
Irrigation in Irrigation & Power		Sarat Kumar Deb; MLA from Aul	25 October 1979	17 February 1980	JP
Finance		Ram Prasad Mishra; MLA from Loisingha	26 June 1977	17 February 1980	JP
Animal Husbandry in Fisheries & Animal Husbandry		Ram Prasad Mishra; MLA from Loisingha	26 June 1977	25 October 1979	JP
Forest		Natabara Pradhan; MLA from Boudh	26 June 1977	17 February 1980	JP
Fisheries in Fisheries & Animal Husbandry		Natabara Pradhan; MLA from Boudh	26 June 1977	17 February 1980	JP
Fisheries & Animal Husbandry		Natabara Pradhan; MLA from Boudh	25 October 1979	17 February 1980	JP
Works		Natabara Pradhan; MLA from Boudh	26 June 1977	25 October 1979	JP
Works		Brundaban Nayak; MLA from Hinjili	25 October 1979	17 February 1980	JP
Transport		Natabara Pradhan; MLA from Boudh	26 June 1977		JP
Transport		Bed Prakash Agarwal; MLA from Kendrapara	25 October 1979	17 February 1980	JP
Labour & Employment; Housing		Biswa Bhusan Harichandan; MLA from Chilka	26 June 1977	25 October 1979	JP
Food & Civil Supplies; Law		Biswa Bhusan Harichandan; MLA from Chilka	26 June 1977	25 October 1979	JP
Food & Civil Supplies; Law		Natabara Pradhan; MLA from Boudh	25 October 1979	17 February 1980	JP
Culture		Biswa Bhusan Harichandan; MLA from Chilka	26 June 1977	25 October 1979	JP
Culture		Bed Prakash Agarwal; MLA from Kendrapara	25 October 1979	17 February 1980	JP
Industries; Mines & Geology		Harish Chandra Buxipatra; MLA from Koraput	26 June 1977	17 February 1980	JP
Tourism		Harish Chandra Buxipatra; MLA from Koraput	26 June 1977	25 October 1979	JP
Tourism		Bed Prakash Agarwal; MLA from Kendrapara	25 October 1979	17 February 1980	JP
Parliamentary Affairs in Political & Services		Bed Prakash Agarwal; MLA from Kendrapara	25 October 1979	17 February 1980	JP
Rural Development		Harish Chandra Buxipatra; MLA from Koraput	26 June 1977	25 October 1979	JP
Rural Development		Brundaban Nayak; MLA from Hinjili	25 October 1979	17 February 1980	JP
Urban Development; Excise (till 1979); Excise & Prohibition (after 1979)		Jhasketan Sahu; MLA from Sambalpur	26 June 1977	17 February 1980	JP
Community Development & Social Welfare		Adwait Prasad Singh; MLA from Angul	25 October 1979	17 February 1980	JP
Minister of State
Tribal & Rural Welfare		Birabhadra Singh; MLA from Udala	26 June 1977	17 February 1980	JP
Lift Irrigation & Power in Irrigation & Power		Birabhadra Singh; MLA from Udala	25 October 1979	17 February 1980	JP
Health & Family Welfare		Ghasiram Majhi; MLA from Nawapara	26 June 1977	25 October 1979	JP
Health & Family Welfare		Maheswar Baug; MLA from Basta	25 October 1979	17 February 1980	JP
Forest		Ghasiram Majhi; MLA from Nawapara	26 June 1977	25 October 1979	JP
Forest		Raghunath Hembram; MLA from Karanjia	25 October 1979	17 February 1980	
Animal Husbandry in Fisheries & Animal Husbandry		Ghasiram Majhi; MLA from Nawapara	26 June 1977	25 October 1979	JP
Animal Husbandry in Fisheries & Animal Husbandry		Premchand Bhagat; MLA from Biramitrapur	25 October 1979	17 February 1980	JP
Community Development & Social Welfare; Public Relations in Home (till 1979); Information & Public Relations (after 1979)		Adwait Prasad Singh; MLA from Angul	26 June 1977	25 October 1979	JP
Community Development & Social Welfare; Public Relations in Home (till 1979); Information & Public Relations (after 1979)		Damodar Rout; MLA from Ersama	25 October 1979	17 February 1980	JP
Co-operation		Adwait Prasad Singh; MLA from Angul	26 June 1977	25 October 1979	JP
Co-operation		Nabin Kumar Pradhan; MLA from Bargarh	25 October 1979	17 February 1980	JP
Rural Development; Fisheries in Fisheries & Animal Husbandry		Saharai Oram; MLA from Champua	26 June 1977	17 February 1980	JP
Labour & Employment; Housing; Law (till 1979); Law (except Hindu Religious Endowments) (after 1979)		Ignace Majhi; MLA from Talsara	26 June 1977	17 February 1980	JP
Hindu Religious Endowments in Law; Agriculture		Muralidhar Guru; MLA from Bolangir	25 October 1979	17 February 1980	JP
Jails in Home; Commerce; Transport		Harihar Swain; MLA from Aska	26 June 1977	17 February 1980	JP
Tourism; Culture		Harihar Swain; MLA from Aska	25 October 1979	17 February 1980	JP
Excise & Prohibition		Rabi Singh Majhi; MLA from Umerkote	25 October 1979	17 February 1980	JP
Education & Youth Services; Culture		Kalindi Behera; MLA from Salepur	25 October 1979	17 February 1980	JP
Urban Development; Industries		Srikant Kumar Jena; MLA from Bari Derabisi	25 October 1979	17 February 1980	JP

== Demographics ==
Division	District	Ministers	Cabinet Ministers	Ministers of State / Deputy Ministers
Central	Cuttack	9	Pratap Chandra Mohanty; Bed Prakash Agarwal; Pradipta Kishore Das; Prahlad Mallik; Jagannath Mallik; Sarat Kumar Deb	Damodar Rout; Kalindi Behera; Srikant Kumar Jena
Central	Puri	1	Biswa Bhusan Harichandan	–
Central	Balasore	2	Nilamani Routray (Chief Minister)	Maheswar Baug
Central	Mayurbhanj	2	–	Birabhadra Singh; Raghunath Hembram
Northern	Sambalpur	3	Jhasketan Sahu	Nabin Kumar Pradhan; Ignace Majhi
Northern	Sundergarh	1	–	Premchand Bhagat
Northern	Keonjhar	1	–	Saharai Oram
Northern	Dhenkanal	1	Adwait Prasad Singh	–
Northern	Balangir	2	Ram Prasad Mishra	Muralidhar Guru
Southern	Ganjam	2	Brundaban Nayak	Harihar Swain
Southern	Kalahandi	0	–	–
Southern	Koraput	3	Harish Chandra Buxipatra; Ghasiram Majhi	Rabi Singh Majhi
Southern	Phulbani	1	Natabara Pradhan	–
