= Kamala Das (politician) =

Politician from Odisha, India

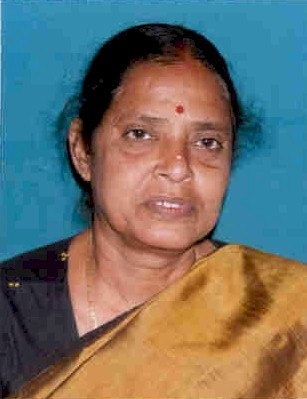

Minister for Health & Family Welfare Government of Odisha
- In office 2000–2001

Minister for Education and Youth Services Government of Odisha
- In office 1990–1995

Member of Legislative Assembly
- In office 1990–2004
- Preceded by: Umarani Patra
- Succeeded by: Ananta Das
- Constituency: Bhograi

Personal details
- Born: 16 August 1945 Balasore district, Odisha
- Died: 12 April 2024 (aged 78) Cuttack, Odisha
- Party: Biju Janata Dal
- Other political affiliations: Janata Dal, INC

Kamala Das (16 August 1945 – 12 April 2024) was an Indian politician from Odisha. She was a former member of the Odisha Legislative Assembly representing the Bhograi Assembly constituency and served as minister for Education & Youth Services, Health & Family Welfare, Woman and Child Development in Biju Patnaik and Naveen Patnaik Ministry.

== Political career ==
Kamala Das was first elected as an MLA in 1990 from Bhograi Constituency in Balasore district on Janata Dal ticket. She was re-elected in 1995, and then again in 2000 as a BJD candidate. She served as MoS for Education & Youth Services, and MoS for Health & Family Welfare in the Biju Patnaik government from 1991 to 1996. She was also the Woman and Child Development Minister in the Naveen Patnaik Ministry from 2000 to 9 July 2001. She was dropped as minister in 2001 and later she switched over to Congress party and returned to the BJD in 2014.

== Political statistics ==
	Year	Contested for	Party	Constituency	Opponent	Votes	Majority	Result
1	1990	MLA	Janata Dal	Bhograi	Bijaya Kumar Pati (INC)	61687 - 38845	22842	Won
2	1995	MLA	Janata Dal	Bhograi	Umarani Patra (INC)	52824 - 38797	14027	Won
3	2000	MLA	Biju Janata Dal	Bhograi	Kartikeswar Patra (INC)	55763 - 54708	1055	Won

== Death ==
Kamala Das was admitted to a private hospital in Bhubaneswar after she complained of chest pain, during the course of the treatment, she was diagnosed with a lung infection and she was shifted to a hospital in Cuttack and died while undergoing treatment on 12 April 2024.
