= Goutam Buddha Das =

Goutam Buddha Das may refer to:

- Goutam Buddha Das (academic administrator)
- Goutam Buddha Das (politician)
