= Goutam Buddha Das (politician) =

Indian politician

- Goutam Buddha Das during a book inauguration at Bhubaneswar in 2026

Member of Odisha Legislative Assembly
- Incumbent
- Assumed office 4 June 2024
- Preceded by: Ananta Das
- Constituency: Bhograi

Personal details
- Party: Biju Janata Dal
- Profession: Politician

Goutam Buddha Das is an Indian politician from Odisha. He is a Member of the Odisha Legislative Assembly from 2024, representing Bhograi Assembly constituency as a Member of the Biju Janata Dal.

== See also ==
- 2024 Odisha Legislative Assembly election
- Odisha Legislative Assembly
