= Baikunthanath Swain =

- ବୈକୁଣ୍ଠନାଥ ସ୍ୱାଇଁ

Member: 11th Odisha Legislative Assembly
- In office 1995 – 2 October 1995
- Preceded by: Surendranath Nayak
- Succeeded by: Surendranath Nayak
- Constituency: Kakatpur Assembly constituency

Member: 8th Odisha Legislative Assembly
- In office 1980–1985
- Preceded by: Surendranath Nayak
- Succeeded by: Surendranath Nayak
- Constituency: Kakatapur

Personal details
- Born: 13 January 1935
- Died: 2 October 1995 (aged 60)
- Citizenship: Indian
- Party: Indian National Congress
- Spouse: Kadambini Swain
- Parent: Achyutananda Swain (father)
- Occupation: politician

Baikunthanath Swain (13 January 1935 – 2 October 1995) was an Odia politician. He was elected to the 8th and 11th Odisha Legislative Assembly from Kakatpur Assembly constituency in 1980 and 1995.

== Early life ==
Swain was born to Achutananda Swain on 13 January 1935. His wife's name was Kadambini Swain.

== Political career ==
He was active in Odisha politics as a member of Indian National Congress and elected twice to Odisha Legislative Assembly.

== Death ==
He died on 2 October 1995 at 60.
