= Bhograi Assembly constituency =

Constituency of the Odisha legislative assembly in India

Coordinates: 21.66°N 87.36°E

Bhograi
- Constituency No. 36 for the Odisha Legislative Assembly

Constituency details
- Country: India
- Region: East India
- State: Odisha
- Division: Central Division
- District: Balasore
- Lok Sabha constituency: Balasore
- Established: 1951
- Total electors: 2,33,902 (Note: as on 2024) (Note: as data published by election commission)
- Reservation: None

Member of Legislative Assembly
- 17th Odisha Legislative Assembly
- Incumbent Goutam Buddha Das
- Party: Biju Janata Dal
- Elected year: 2024

Bhograi is a Vidhan Sabha constituency of Balasore district, Odisha.

Area of this constituency includes Bhograi block.

== Elected members ==
Vote share of winning candidates
| 2024 | 39.89% |
| 2019 | 46.79% |
| 2014 | 50.11% |
| 2009 | 53.34% |
| 2004 | 41.03% |
| 2000 | 45.92% |
| 1995 | 40.03% |
| 1990 | 60.48% |
| 1985 | 46.86% |
| 1980 | 50.55% |
| 1977 | 62.13% |

Since its formation in 1951, 17 elections were held till date.

List of members elected from Bhograi constituency are:

| Year | Member | Party |
|---|---|---|
| 2024 | Goutam Buddha Das | Biju Janata Dal |
| 2019 | Ananta Das | Biju Janata Dal |
| 2014 | Ananta Das | Biju Janata Dal |
| 2009 | Ananta Das | Biju Janata Dal |
| 2004 | Ananta Das | Biju Janata Dal |
| 2000 | Kamala Das | Biju Janata Dal |
| 1995 | Kamala Das | Janata Dal |
| 1990 | Kamala Das | Janata Dal |
| 1985 | Umarani Patra | Indian National Congress |
| 1980 | Kartikeswar Patra | Indian National Congress (I) |
| 1977 | Sushanta Chand | Janata Party |
| 1974 | Kartikeswar Patra | Indian National Congress |
| 1971 | Kartikeswar Patra | Indian National Congress (R) |
| 1967 | Pyarimohan Das | Praja Socialist Party |
| 1961 | Pyarimohan Das | Praja Socialist Party |
| 1957 | Durga Sankar Das | Indian National Congress |
| 1951 | Sashikanta Bhanj | Independent politician |

== Election results ==
=== 2024 ===
Voting were held on 1 June 2024 in 4th phase of Odisha Assembly Election & 7th phase of Indian General Election. Counting of votes was on 4 June 2024. In 2024 election, Biju Janata Dal candidate Goutam Buddha Das defeated Indian National Congress candidate Satya Shiba Das by a margin of 6,564 votes.

2024 Odisha Vidhan Sabha Election, Bhograi
| Party | Candidate | Votes | % | ±% |
|---|---|---|---|---|
| BJD | Goutam Buddha Das | 70,198 | 39.89 | ▼6.90 |
| INC | Satya Shiba Das | 63,634 | 36.16 | ▼0.35 |
| BJP | Ashish Patra | 41,059 | 23.33 | ▲7.81 |
| NOTA | None of the above | 458 | 0.26 | ▼0.04 |
| Majority | | 6,564 | 3.73 | |
| Turnout | | 1,75,975 | 75.23 | |
| BJD hold | | | | |

=== 2019 ===
In 2019 election, Biju Janata Dal candidate Ananta Das defeated Indian National Congress candidate Satya Shiba Das by a margin of 19,512 votes.

2019 Vidhan Sabha Election, Bhograi
| Party | Candidate | Votes | % | ±% |
|---|---|---|---|---|
| BJD | Ananta Das | 76,796 | 46.79 | ▼3.32 |
| INC | Satya Shiba Das | 59,921 | 36.51 | ▼0.86 |
| BJP | Anshuman Mohanty | 25,474 | 15.52 | ▲5.88 |
| NOTA | None of the above | 488 | 0.30 | |
| Majority | | 16,875 | 10.28 | |
| Turnout | | 164116 | 72.44 | |
| BJD hold | | | | |

=== 2014 ===
In 2014 election, Biju Janata Dal candidate Ananta Das defeated Indian National Congress candidate Satya Shiba Das by a margin of 19,512 votes.

2014 Vidhan Sabha Election, Bhograi
| Party | Candidate | Votes | % | ±% |
|---|---|---|---|---|
| BJD | Ananta Das | 76,761 | 50.11 | ▼3.23 |
| INC | Satya Shiba Das | 57,249 | 37.37 | ▼3.16 |
| BJP | Paresh Chandra Nayak | 14,772 | 9.64 | ▲4.94 |
| NOTA | None of the above | 531 | 0.35 | − |
| Majority | | 19,512 | 12.74 | |
| Turnout | | 1,53,177 | 75.74 | 3.53 |
| Registered electors | | 2,02,228 | | |
| BJD hold | | | | |

=== 2009 ===
In 2009 election, Biju Janata Dal candidate Ananta Das defeated Indian National Congress candidate Kartikeswar Patra by a margin of 17,650 votes.

2009 Vidhan Sabha Election, Bhograi
| Party | Candidate | Votes | % | ±% |
|---|---|---|---|---|
| BJD | Ananta Das | 73,474 | 53.34 | − |
| INC | Kartikeswar Patra | 55,824 | 40.53 | − |
| BJP | Ramakanta Behera | 6,468 | 4.70 | − |
| Majority | | 17,650 | 12.81 (Note: %of total valid votes) | − |
| Turnout | | 1,37,773 | 72.21 | − |
| BJD hold | | | | |
