= Lalit Mohan Gandhi =

Indian politician (1951–2016)

Lalit Mohan Gandhi (2 October 1951 – 6 December 2016) was an Indian National Congress politician from Odisha.

He was inducted into the Youth Congress during the Emergency as one of the Sanjay storm-troopers. Elected in the Odisha Legislative Assembly election in 1977 and 1980 from Titlagarh constituency. In 1980, he retained his Titlagarh seat due to the "Indira Wave" and served as Minister of State, Information Broadcasting and Public Relations and Planning and Coordination under Janaki Ballabh Patnaik's cabinet. He was also a renowned writer and had penned many short stories, Hindi poems and composed Sambalpuri songs.

Gandhi died on 6 December 2016, of injuries suffered while trying to reboard his train after a brief halt at Khariar Road railway station.

He is survived by his wife, two daughters and a son.

Odisha chief minister Naveen Patnaik condoled the death of Gandhi. “My thoughts and prayers with the bereaved family,” wrote the CM on his twitter handle.
