= Kartikeswar Patra =

Indian politician

Kartikeswar Patra (25 May 1941 – 6 October 2020) was an Indian politician and Odia writer.

== Career ==
Patra was first elected as MLA from Bhograi Assembly constituency in 1971, 1974 and 1980 and served as a member of the Lok Sabha, for the Indian National Congress, from 1991-1996, representing Balasore. His wife Umarani Patra is also a former MLA of Bhograi.

Patra died in 2020 from COVID-19 aged 79.
