= Naka Laxmaya =

Indian politician (1950–2020)

Odisha Legislative Assembly
- In office 9 June 1980 – 9 March 1985
- Preceded by: Naka Kannaya
- Succeeded by: Nadiabasi Biswas
- Constituency: Malkangiri

Personal details
- Born: 2 December 1950
- Died: 16 January 2020 (aged 69)
- Political party: Indian National Congress

Naka Laxmaya (2 December 1950 – 16 January 2020) was an Indian politician from Odisha belonging to Indian National Congress. He was a legislator of the Odisha Legislative Assembly.

== Biography ==
Laxmaya was born on 2 December 1950. He was elected as a member of the Odisha Legislative Assembly from Malkangiri in 1980.

Laxmaya died on 16 January 2020 at the age of 69.
