= Manmohan Mathur =

Indian politician

Member of Parliament, Rajya Sabha
- In office 1988–1994
- Constituency: Odisha

Personal details
- Born: 16 August 1946
- Party: Indian National Congress
- Spouse: Laxmi Mathur

Manmohan Mathur is an Indian politician. He was a Member of Parliament, representing Odisha in the Rajya Sabha the upper house of India's Parliament as a member of the Indian National Congress.
