= Niranjan Patnaik =

Indian politician

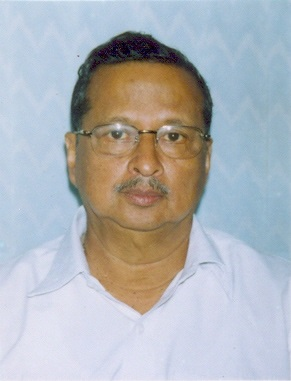

President of the Odisha Pradesh Congress Committee
- In office 19 April 2018 – 23 May 2022
- Preceded by: Prasad Harichandan
- Succeeded by: Sarat Pattanayak
- In office 7 June 2011 – 13 May 2013
- Preceded by: K. P. Singh Deo
- Succeeded by: Jayadev Jena

Cabinet Minister of Revenue, Science & Technology, Government of Odisha
- In office 15 March 1995 – 29 February 2000
- Governor: B. Satya Narayan Reddy; G. Ramanujam; C. Rangarajan

Cabinet Minister of Irrigation & Power, Government of Odisha
- In office 9 March 1985 – 3 March 1990
- Governor: Bishambhar Nath Pande

Cabinet Minister of Health & Family Welfare, Government of Odisha
- In office 6 February 1987 – 3 March 1990
- Governor: Bishambhar Nath Pande

Cabinet Minister of Industries, Textiles & Handlooms, Government of Odisha
- In office 9 June 1980 – 9 March 1985
- Governor: Bhagwat Dayal Sharma; Cheppudira Muthana Poonacha

Member of the Odisha Legislative Assembly
- In office 9 June 1980 – 19 May 2009
- Constituency: Ramachandrapur

Personal details
- Born: 22 February 1942 (age 84) Anandapur, Keonjhar district, Odisha, India
- Party: Indian National Congress
- Children: Devjyoti Patnaik; Navajyoti Patnaik
- Relatives: Soumya Ranjan Patnaik (brother); Amiya Ranjan Patnaik (brother); Dipti Ranjan Patnaik (brother)
- Education: Utkal University (BA)

Niranjan Patnaik (born 22 February 1942) is an Indian politician from Odisha. He is a former state president of the Odisha Pradesh Congress Committee and has served as a cabinet minister in the Odisha State Government under Chief Minister Janaki Ballabh Patnaik. He has been associated with various labour unions in the Keonjhar region and worked as an artisanal miner, securing his first lease in 1969.

During his ministerial tenures, Patnaik worked on infrastructure development, irrigation, and flood control systems across Odisha. He has publicly raised concerns regarding urban flooding stemming from rapid urbanisation and industrial growth affecting land use and water tables in the state.

== Political career ==
Patnaik held multiple portfolios during his service in the Janaki Ballabh Patnaik cabinet. He served as the Minister of Industries & Textiles, Handlooms, and Handicrafts & Cottage Industries, and also managed portfolios including Irrigation & Power, Revenue, Science, and Health & Family Welfare. During his tenure, his ministry focused on drafting a long-term irrigation master plan for water management in the state, drawing insights from project models in Canada, Arizona, and Texas.

As Minister of Health in 1987, Patnaik focused on state administrative reforms regarding the recording and reporting of public health outbreaks, pandemics, and hunger-related mortality in vulnerable, infrastructure-deficient regions of Odisha.

During his tenure as the Pradesh Congress Committee President leading into the 2019 General Elections and concurrent Odisha State Legislative Assembly elections, the state party apparatus drafted an election manifesto highlighting policies targeted at marginalized demographics and integrating the national Congress party's Universal Basic Income initiative, Nyuntam Aay Yojana (NYAY).

== Personal life ==
Patnaik belongs to the Karan caste of Odisha. He is the son of Braja Bandhu Patnaik and is from the Anandapur region in the Keonjhar district. He has two sons, Devjyoti Patnaik and Nabajyoti Patnaik, the latter of whom is also active in state politics.

Patnaik has three brothers: Soumya Ranjan Patnaik, a politician, media business owner, and the founder-editor of the Odia daily newspaper Sambad; Amiya Ranjan Patnaik, who worked as an Odia film producer and director; and Dipti Ranjan Patnaik. His family maintains business interests in various industrial sectors across the state, including mineral mining and seafood exports.
