= Niranjan Jena =

Indian politician (1916–1983)

Member of Parliament, Lok Sabha
- In office 1952–1957
- Succeeded by: Surendra Mohanty
- Constituency: Dhenkanal, Odisha

Personal details
- Born: 1 August 1916 Nrutang, Cuttack district, Odisha, British India
- Died: 18 July 1983 (aged 66) Cuttack, Odisha, India
- Party: Indian National Congress
- Spouse: Rama Devi

Niranjan Jena (1 August 1916 – 18 July 1983) was an Indian politician. He was elected to the Lok Sabha, the lower house of the Parliament of India as a member of the Indian National Congress.

Jena died in Cuttack on 18 July 1983, at the age of 66.
