= Sahura Mallick =

Indian politician (died 2019)

MLA of Baliguda
- In office 1974–1977
- Preceded by: Naresh Pradhan
- Succeeded by: Sadananda Kanhar
- In office 1980–1985
- Preceded by: Sadananda Kanhar
- Succeeded by: Laxmikanta Mallick
- In office 1995–2000
- Preceded by: Bhagaban Kanhar
- Succeeded by: Surendra Kanhar

Personal details
- Born: 1933/34
- Died: 16 August 2019
- Party: Indian National Congress

Sahura Mallick was an Indian politician belonging to the Indian National Congress. He was elected as a member of Orissa Legislative Assembly in 1974, 1980, and 1995. He died on 16 August 2019 at the age of 85.
