= Biju Patnaik =

Indian politician and aviator (1916-1997)

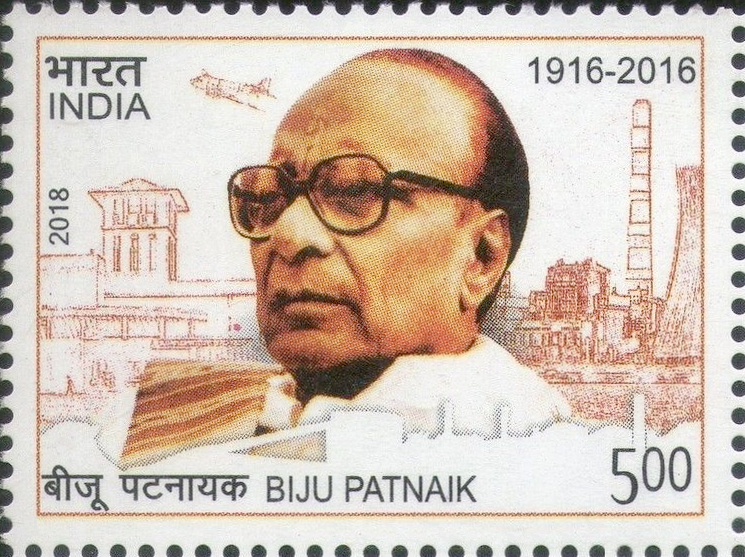
- Biju Patnaik commemorative stamp

3rd Chief Minister of Odisha
- In office 5 March 1990 – 15 March 1995
- Preceded by: Hemananda Biswal
- Succeeded by: Janaki Ballabh Pattanaik
- In office 23 June 1961 – 2 October 1963
- Preceded by: Harekrushna Mahatab
- Succeeded by: Biren Mitra

Union Minister of Steel, Mines and Coals
- In office 30 July 1979 – 14 January 1980
- Prime Minister: Charan Singh
- Preceded by: Vacant
- Succeeded by: Pranab Mukherjee
- In office 26 March 1977 – 15 July 1979
- Prime Minister: Morarji Desai
- Preceded by: Chandrajit Yadav (as MoS)
- Succeeded by: Vacant

Member of Parliament, Lok Sabha
- In office 1996–1997
- Preceded by: Ramchandra Rath
- Succeeded by: Naveen Patnaik
- Constituency: Aska
- In office 1977–1985
- Preceded by: Surendra Mohanty
- Succeeded by: Sarat Kumar Deb
- Constituency: Kendrapara

Member of Parliament, Rajya Sabha
- In office 13 May 1971 – 6 October 1971
- Constituency: Orissa

Member of the Orissa Legislative Assembly
- In office 1985–1996
- Preceded by: Rama Krushna Pati
- Succeeded by: Biswabhusan Harichandan
- Constituency: Bhubaneswar
- In office 1980–1980
- Preceded by: Bijoy Mohapatra
- Succeeded by: Prahlad Mallik
- Constituency: Patkura
- In office 1971–1977
- Preceded by: Prahlad Mallik
- Succeeded by: Nalinikanta Mohanty
- Constituency: Rajanagar
- In office 1961–1967
- Preceded by: Constituency established
- Succeeded by: Akulananda Behera
- Constituency: Choudwar
- In office 1957–1961
- Preceded by: Constituency established
- Succeeded by: Arjun Naik
- Constituency: Surada
- In office 1952–1957
- Preceded by: Constituency established
- Succeeded by: Constituency abolished
- Constituency: Jaganathprasad
- In office 18 April 1946 – 20 February 1952
- Preceded by: Constituency established
- Succeeded by: Constituency abolished
- Constituency: Central Cuttack Sadar

Personal details
- Born: Bijayananda Patnaik; 5 March 1916 Cuttack, Bihar and Orissa Province, British India (now Odisha, India)
- Died: 17 April 1997 (aged 81) New Delhi, India
- Party: Janata Dal (1989–1997)
- Other political affiliations: Janata Party (1977–1989); Utkal Congress (1969–1977); Indian National Congress (1946–1969)
- Spouse: Gyan Patnaik
- Children: Prem Patnaik; Naveen Patnaik; Gita Mehta
- Relatives: Sonny Mehta (son-in-law)
- Education: Ravenshaw Collegiate SchoolRavenshaw College
- Profession: Politician; Entrepreneur; Aviator
- Awards: Bintang Jasa Utama (1995); Order of Lenin

Bijayananda Patnaik (5 March 1916 – 17 April 1997) was an Indian politician, aviator and businessman. He served as the 3rd chief minister of the State of Odisha from 1961 to 1963 and from 1990 to 1995. He was also the 14th steel and mines minister, and 1st coal union minister of India from 1979 to 1980, and from 1977 to 1979. He was a member of Lok Sabha from Kendrapara from 1977 to 1985. He was the father of Naveen Patnaik, also a former chief minister of the state.

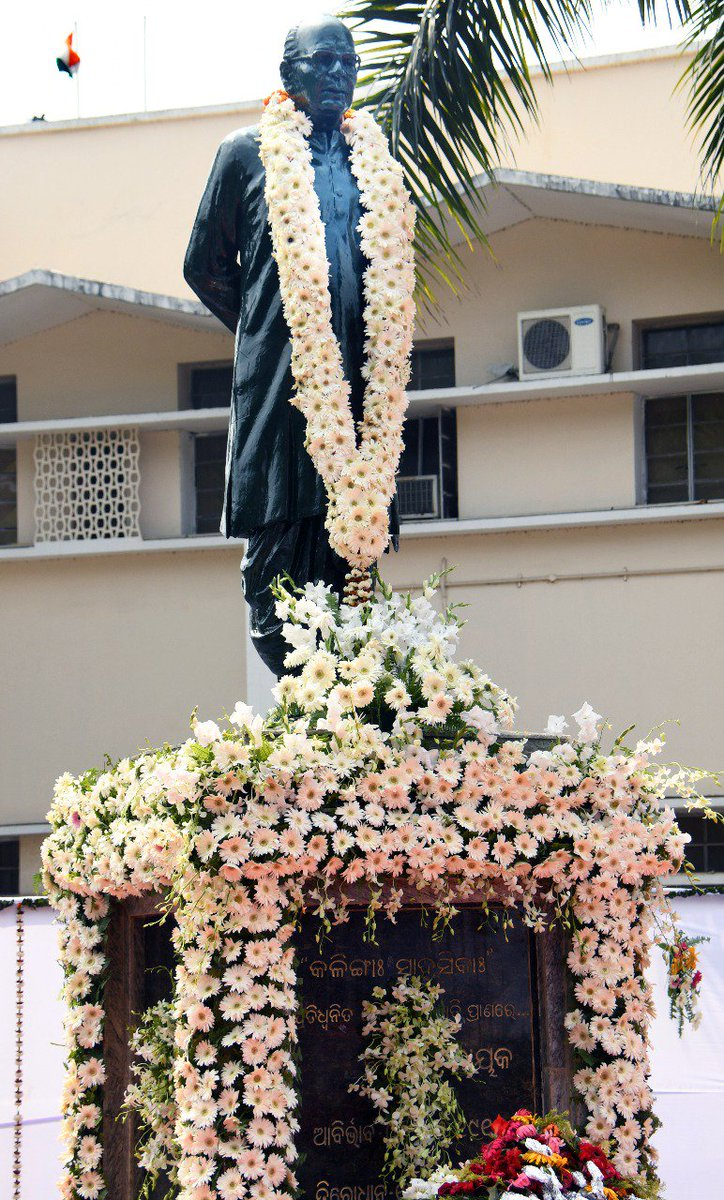
Statue of Biju Patnaik

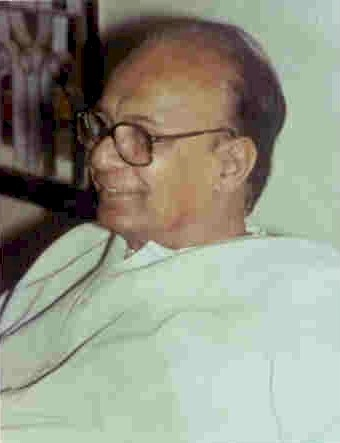
Biju Patnaik In 1990

== Early life ==
Biju Patnaik’s father, Laxminarayan Patnaik, as the Dewan of Parlakimedi in the 1931 Purnachandra Odia Bhashakosha

Biju Patnaik was born into an 'aristocratic' Karan family of Odisha. His parents lived in Ghumusar Nuagam, Bellaguntha, Ganjam district, around 80km from Bramhapur. Patnaik's father Laxminarayan Patnaik was the Dewan of Paralakhemundi Estate under Maharaja Krushna Chandra Gajapati. His mothers name was Ashalata Ray who was a major influence in Biju's formulative years. Patnaik was educated at Ravenshaw College in Odisha but, due to his interest in aviation, dropped out and trained as a pilot.

== Aviation career and role in World War II ==
Patnaik began his career as a pilot in the 1930s and quickly established himself as a skilled aviator. Patnaik trained as a pilot in the 1930s and joined the Indian National Airways after completion of training. Biju joined aviation services during Second World War where he worked as a pilot, flying transport aircraft and gaining experience in challenging conditions. He also served as the head of the Air Transport Command during the period of belligerency.

=== Role in Second World War ===
As part of the Royal Indian Air Force and civilian aviation networks, he flew transport aircraft in dangerous war zones. He undertook multiple missions, including evacuating civilians from Japanese-occupied regions such as Rangoon, supplying arms and logistics to Allied forces, and supporting Chinese and Soviet troops fighting Axis powers. Patnaik notably delivered supplies and logistical support to Soviet forces and assisted operations connected to the Eastern Front, including the Soviet Red Army during the Battle of Stalingrad.

For his contributions to the Soviet cause, he was awarded the Order of Lenin, the highest civilian decoration of the Soviet Union. He was later honored by Russian authorities on the anniversary of the Allied victory with the Jubilee Medal "50 Years of Victory in the Great Patriotic War 1941–1945", recognizing his role in strengthening wartime logistics for the Soviet Red Army.

=== Role in Indonesian independence ===
Patnaik met Jawaharlal Nehru during his participation in Indonesian freedom struggle and formed a political association with him. Nehru viewed the freedom struggle of the Indonesian people as parallel to that of India, and viewed Indonesia as a potential ally. When the Dutch attempted to quell Indonesian independence on 21 July 1947, President Sukarno ordered Sjahrir, the former prime minister of Indonesia, to leave the country to attend the first Inter-Asia Conference, organised by Nehru, in July 1947 and to foment international public opinion against the Dutch. Sjahrir was unable to leave as the Dutch controlled the Indonesian sea and air routes. Nehru asked Patnaik, an experienced pilot, to help evacuate Sjahrir and other Indonesian leaders. Patnaik and his wife flew to an airstrip near Jakarta and landed on an improvised airstrip near Jakarta. Using left-over fuel from abandoned Japanese military dumps, Patnaik took off with Indonesian political leaders such as Sjahrir and Sukarno, for a secret meeting with Nehru at New Delhi and brought out on a Douglas C-47 (Dakota) military aircraft reaching India via Singapore on 24 July 1947.

Patnaik transported supplies and aid to Indonesian resistance fighters, helped train Indonesian aviation personnel, and facilitated diplomatic engagement between India and Indonesia. For his contributions to the Indonesian independence movement, Indonesia granted him the honorary citizenship and awarded Patnaik with the Bhoomi Putra (Son of the Soil) award, described as one of Indonesia's highest honors, rarely granted to a foreigner.

In 1995, when Indonesia was celebrating its 50th Independence Day, Patnaik was awarded the highest national award, the Bintang Jasa Utama. The Dakota laid abandoned at Kolkata airport before being restored and put up on display at Bubhaneswar Airport.

In 2015, Sukarno's daughter Megawati Sukarnoputri recounted that it was Patnaik who suggested she be named Meghavati or "daughter of clouds". She, whose full name is Diah Permata Megawati Setiawati Sukarnoputri, later became Indonesia's first female president, serving from 2001 to 2004.

In 2021, the Indonesian Embassy in New Delhi designated a room in the name of Patnaik. On the walls of the Patnaik room are photographs, newspaper clippings and letters that document Mr. Patnaik's secret assignments to fly out Indonesian leaders, as well as his relations with the Indonesian leadership.

=== Role in Indian independence ===
Patnaik actively participated in the Quit India Movement and assisted prominent leaders such as Ram Manohar Lohia and Jayaprakash Narayan by secretly transporting them across the country. While in service, he developed an interest in nationalist politics and used air force transports to distribute nationalist literature among Indian troops, which British authorities regarded as subversive. He was imprisoned by the British authorities for flying unauthorized missions and distributing political leaflets in support of Indian independence. However Patnaik remained committed to fighting the Axis powers.

Following India's independence in 1947, he played a key role in critical aviation operations. One of his most notable contributions was his involvement in airlifting troops to Kashmir during the early stages of the conflict in 1947, which was crucial in securing the region for India. Patnaik flew the first of many sorties on his Dakota DC-3 from Delhi Safdarjung Airport on 27 October 1947, after the first Dakota DC-3 (Reg. No: VP 905) flown by Wg. Cdr. KL Bhatia landed in Srinagar Airport early morning. Which followed right after the signing of the Instrument of Accession by Maharaja Hari Singh on 26 October 1947. He brought 17 soldiers of 1st Sikh regiment commanded by Lt. Col. Dewan Ranjit Rai. He flew low on the airstrip twice to ensure that no raiders were around. Instructions from Prime Minister Nehru's office were clear: If the airport was taken over by the enemy, he was not to land. Taking a full circle the DC-3 flew ground level, the crew observed that the airstrip was empty. No one was in sight. No opposing combatants were present at the airfield at that time.

== Political career ==
Patnaik has been described as supporting socialist and federalist principles. He advocated the equitable distribution of resources among Indian states, a position noted in his political speeches and writings.

In 1946, Patnaik was elected uncontested to the Odisha Legislative Assembly from North Cuttack constituency. In 1952 and 1957, he won from Jagannathprasad and Surada, respectively. In 1960 he assumed the presidency of the Odisha Pradesh Congress Committee (state unit of the Congress Party).

=== First tenure as chief minister (1961–1963) ===
Patnaik, representing Chowdwar constituency, became chief minister of Odisha on 23 June 1961 at the age of 45 with the Indian National Congress winning 82 of 140 seats. During his tenure, he focused on industrialisation and infrastructure development, aiming to transform Odisha into a modern industrial state. Patnaik remained in the position until 2 October 1963, when he resigned from the post under the Kamaraj Plan to revitalise the Congress party.

=== Role in national administration ===
In the 1960s, due to his proximity to the then Prime Minister of India, Jawaharlal Nehru, Patnaik assumed the planning and special projects mandate of the defense ministry of India becoming an "overseer of the defense effort". With his skills and qualifications in the field of aviation and guerilla warfare during the Second World War, Patnaik carried out a one-man covert mission to Washington DC in March 1963. He conveyed to Robert McNamara and President of the United States John F. Kennedy the need and possibilities for collaboration between American and Indian agencies for specialised military assistance especially in the field of night fighter capabilities of the Indian Airforce and special forces. During this visit he also made a stop at the CIA headquarters to convey possible collaborations between the two nations related to the ongoing Indo-China conflict and worsening Indo-Pak relations. This visit led to the formation of the Aviation Research Centre at Charbatia airbase in Chowduar, Cuttack with the help of American experts and specialists like Ed Rector and Moose Marrero.

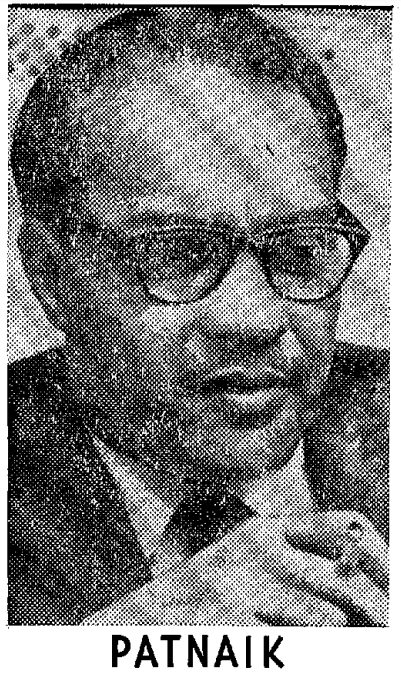
Patnaik at a meeting with CIA and United States officials during his visit in 1963

Patnaik had a political relationship with Indira Gandhi, who took over the Congress Party in 1967. However, they clashed in 1969 over the presidential election. He left the Congress and formed a regional party—the Utkal Congress. His party won several seats in the 1971 assembly election. Patnaik then re-established contact with his old friend Jayaprakash Narayan (whom he knew from his WW2 days) and joined the JP movement as it gained support in 1974. When the Emergency was declared in 1975, Patnaik was one of the first to be arrested, along with other opposition leaders. He was released in 1977.

Later, in the same year, he was elected to the Lok Sabha for the first time from Kendrapara and became Union minister for steel and mines in both the Morarji Desai and the Charan Singh governments until 1979. He was re-elected to the Lok Sabha again in 1980 and 1984 from Kendrapara as Janata Party candidate despite the Congress wave in 1984 following Indira Gandhi's death. He returned to active politics after the Congress defeat in 1989. He supported V. P. Singh during the period leading to Singh’s term as Prime Minister, chose to go back to Odisha, and prepared for the assembly election. Former Chief Minister of Tamil Nadu, M. Karunanidhi claimed in two separate interviews, in April 2009 and in May 2012, that his friend-turned foe M. G. Ramachandran who is also a former chief minister, was ready for the merger of his party, AIADMK, with the mother party DMK in September 1979, with Patnaik acting as the mediator. However, the plan failed to materialise as Panruti S. Ramachandran, a close confidante of Ramachandran, acted as a spoiler and Ramachandran later changed his mind.

=== Second tenure as chief minister (1990–1995) ===
Patnaik returned to power as chief minister of Odisha in 1990. In 1990 state assembly election, the Janata Dal won a two-thirds majority in the state assembly election, which saw Patnaik being the chief minister of Odisha for the second time until 1995.

In 1992, Patnaik famously stated, "In my dream of the 21st century for the State, I would have young men and women who put the interest of the State before them. They will have pride in themselves, confidence in themselves. They will not be at anybody's mercy, except their own selves. By their brains, intelligence and capacity, they will recapture the history of Kalinga."

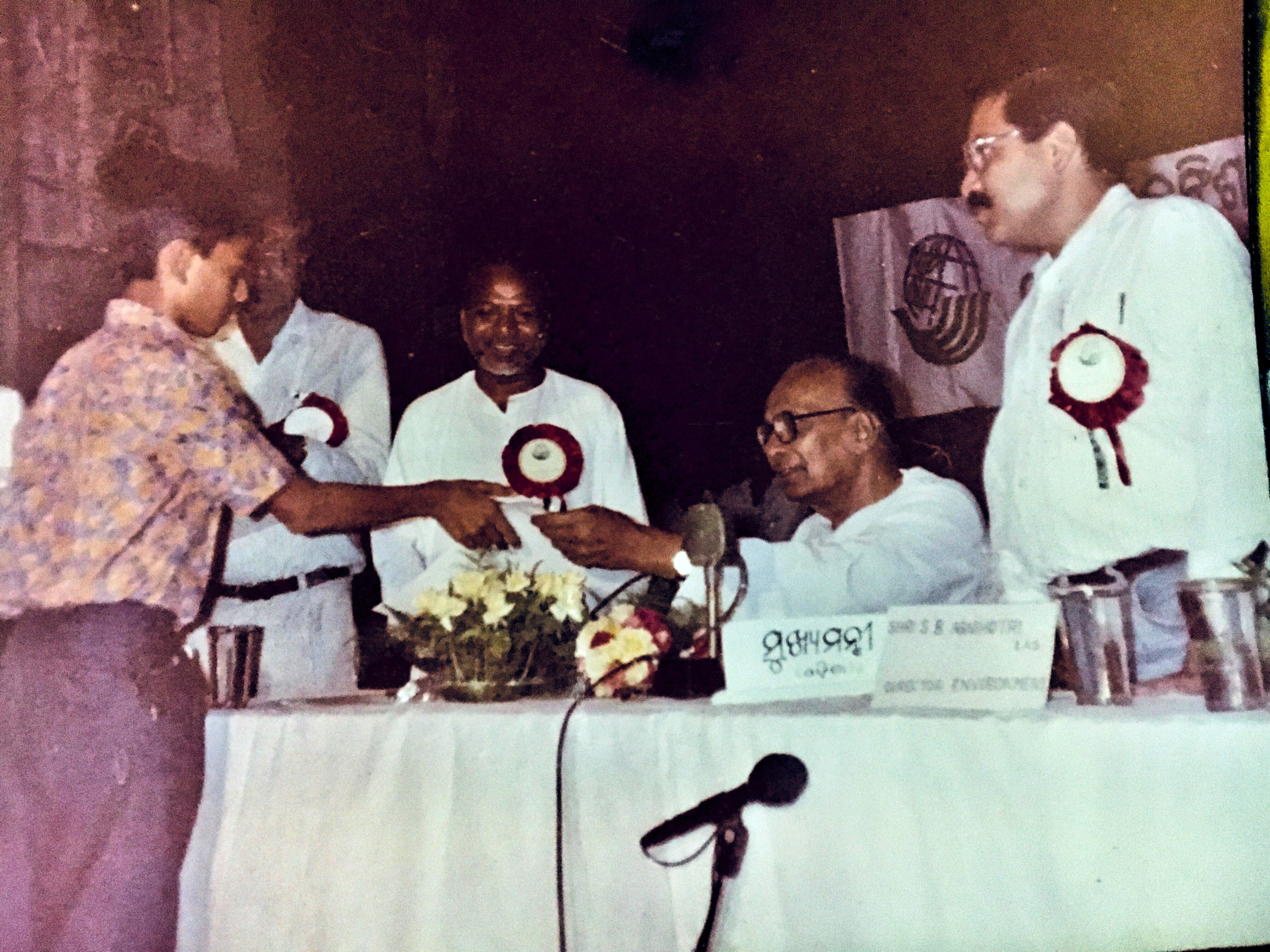
Patnaik giving award to student with then Minister Mangala Kisan in 1990s

Patnaik was re-elected to the Lok Sabha in 1996 from Cuttack and Aska constituencies as a Janata Dal candidate. He retained the latter until his death on 17 April 1997 of cardio-respiratory failure.

=== Achievements as a public representative ===
Patnaik played a key role in promoting industrial development in Odisha. He was associated with the establishment and expansion of major infrastructure and industrial projects, including ports and public sector industries. His vision emphasized the use of Odisha’s natural resources for economic growth and employment generation. He also supported the development of transportation networks and industrial corridors. These efforts contributed to laying the foundation for Odisha’s industrial economy.

== Entrepreneurship and contributions to the Industrial landscape of Odisha ==
Patnaik was involved in establishing several industrial and infrastructure projects, including Kalinga tubes, Kalinga Airlines, Kalinga Iron work, Kalinga Refractories and the Kalinga, a daily Odia newspaper. In 1951 he established the international Kalinga Prize for popularisation of Science and Technology among the people and entrusted the responsibility to the UNESCO. He was involved in establishing or promoting several industrial and infrastructure projects, including the Port of Paradip, Odisha Aviation Centre, Bhubaneswar Airport, the Cuttack-Jagatpur Mahanadi highway bridge, Regional Engineering College, Rourkela, Sainik School Bhubaneswar, Odisha University of Agriculture and Technology-Bhubaneswar, NALCO (National Aluminum Company), Talcher Thermal Power Station, Balimela Hydel Project, HAL-Sunabeda, and Choudwar and Barbil industrial belts. He also established the Kalinga Cup in football.

== Commemoration ==
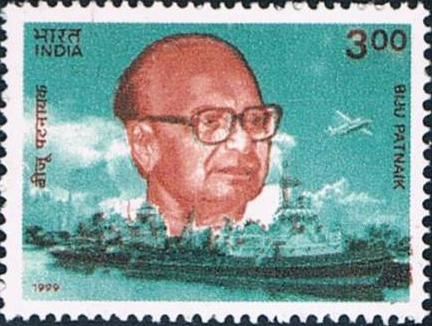
Patnaik's 1999 stamp photo

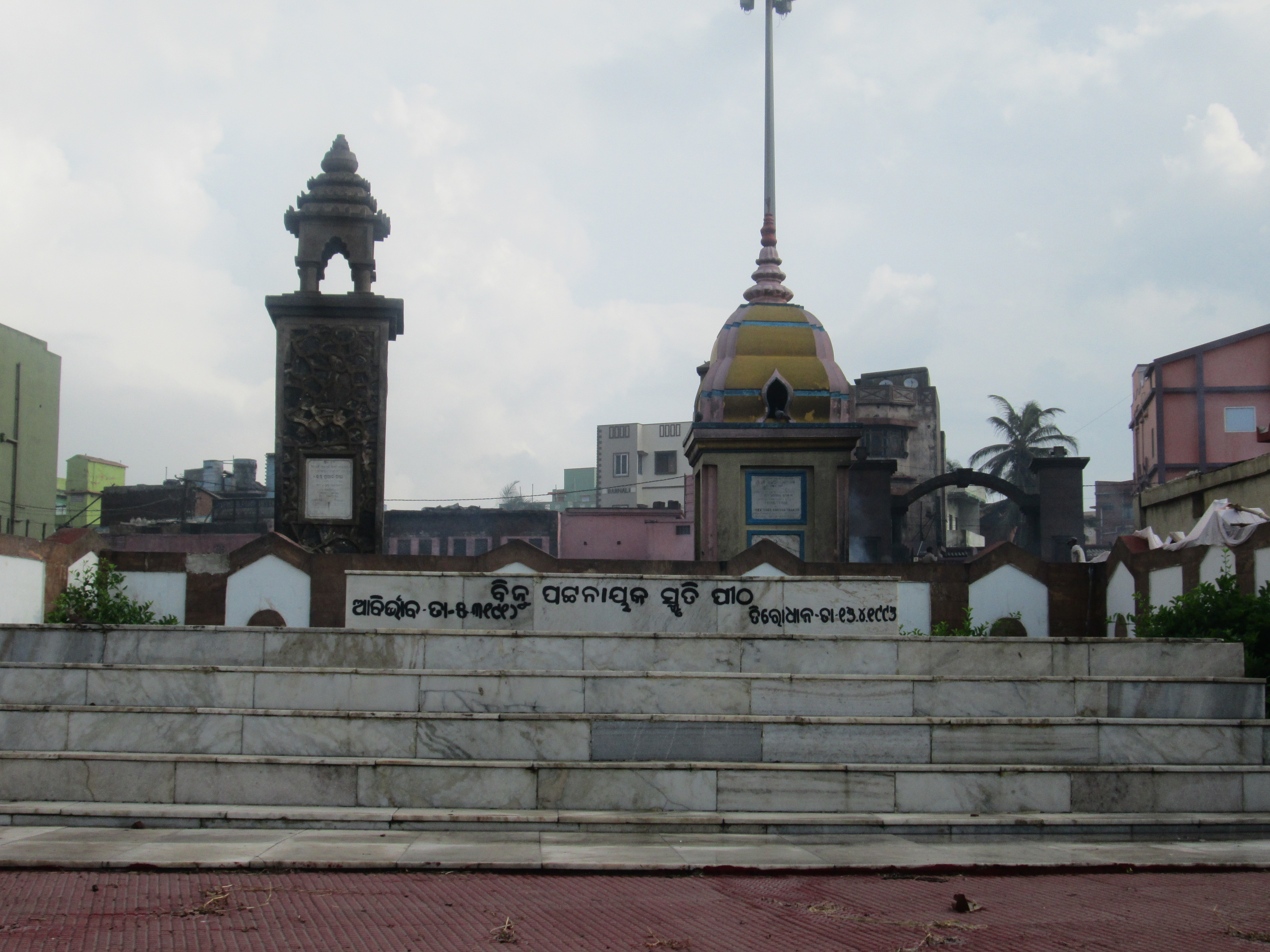
Biju Patnaik Memorial

Institutions in Odisha named after Patnaik include the Biju Patnaik Airport at Bhubaneswar, and the Biju Patnaik University of Technology at Nalco Nagar, Angul. The Odisha government observes 5 March, Patnaik's birthday, as Panchayat Raj Divas in his memory. The Biju Patnaik 5 rupee commemorative coin was released in 2016. Reports noted that his coffin was draped with the flags of India, Russia, and Indonesia.

A commemorative postage stamp was released by India Post to mark his 102nd birth anniversary.

== Personal life ==
Patnaik was an avid bridge player. He married Gyanwati Sethi of Rawalpindi, a Kinnaird College, Lahore alumnus. Because his wife was from Punjab, he was sometimes referred to as a 'son-in-law of Punjab'. She was the first Indian woman to get a commercial pilot's licence. In the 1940s, Gyanwati, also known as Gyan Patnaik, participated with Biju Patnaik in air missions during World War II, including the evacuation of civilians from Rangoon during the Japanese advance.

Together they had three children, Prem, Naveen and Gita. Patnaik's younger son, Naveen Patnaik, was chief minister of Odisha from 2000 to June 2024. His daughter, Gita Mehta, was an author. His elder son Prem Patnaik is a Delhi-based industrialist.

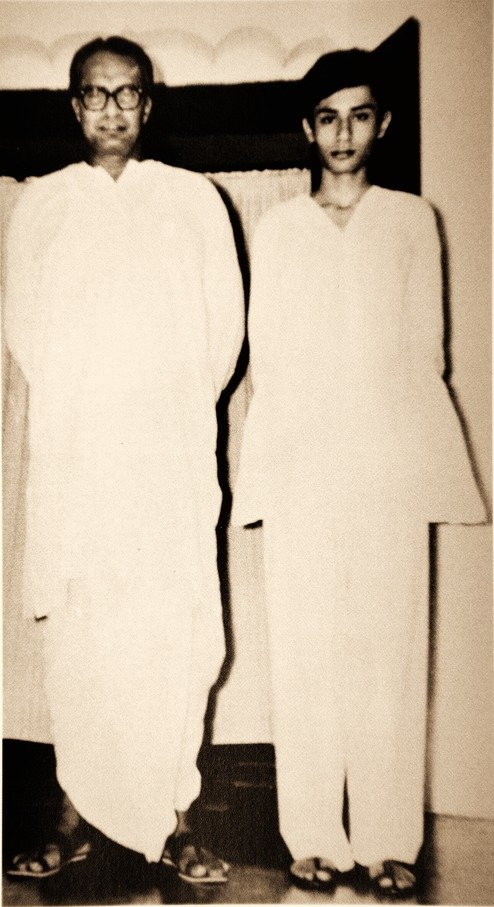
Patnaik with his youngest son, Naveen Patnaik, in the 1950s

== Electoral history ==
House	Constituency	Start	End	Party	Notes
11th Lok Sabha	Aska	22 May 1996	17 April 1997*	JD	*Expired
11th Orissa Vidhan Sabha	Bhubaneswar	15 March 1995	20 May 1996	JD	LoP, Odisha Assembly; Resigned as elected to Lok Sabha
10th Orissa Vidhan Sabha	Bhubaneswar	3 March 1990	15 March 1995	JD	Chief Minister
9th Orissa Vidhan Sabha	Bhubaneswar	9 March 1985	3 March 1990	JP	LoP, Odisha Assembly
8th Lok Sabha	Kendrapara	15 January 1985	25 March 1985	JP	Resigned as elected to Odisha Assembly
8th Orissa Vidhan Sabha	Patkura	9 June 1980	11 June 1980	Janata Party (Secular)	Resigned as he was member of Lok Sabha
7th Lok Sabha	Kendrapara	21 January 1980	31 December 1984	Janata Party (Secular)	
6th Lok Sabha	Kendrapara	25 March 1977	22 August 1979	BLD	
6th Orissa Vidhan Sabha	Rajanagar	6 March 1974	30 April 1977	Utkal Congress	LoP, Odisha Assembly
5th Orissa Vidhan Sabha	Rajanagar	24 September 1971	3 March 1973	Utkal Congress	LoP, Odisha Assembly
Rajya Sabha	Odisha	13 May 1971	6 October 1971	Utkal Congress	Resigned as elected to Odisha Assembly
3rd Orissa Vidhan Sabha	Choudwar	21 June 1961	1 March 1967	INC	Chief Minister
2nd Orissa Vidhan Sabha	Surada	1 April 1957	25 February 1961	INC	
1st Orissa Vidhan Sabha	Jagannathprasad	20 February 1952	4 March 1957	INC	
2nd Orissa Provisional Assembly	Central Cuttack Sadar	18 April 1946	20 February 1952	INC	

== Awards and honours ==
This is a comprehensive list of state honours received by Biju Patnaik.

Ribbon	Decoration	Country	Year	Presenter	Note
	Order of Lenin	Soviet Union	1967	Government of the Soviet Union	Single-grade order, the highest civilian decoration bestowed by the Soviet Union.
	Jubilee Medal	Russia	1995	Federal Government of Russia	State Commemorative Medal, awarded to veterans who participated in the fighting in the Great Patriotic War.
	Bintang Jasa Utama	Indonesia	1995	Government of Indonesia	First-class, awarded for civil bravery and courage in times of adversity in Indonesia.

== See also ==
- List of chief ministers of Odisha
- Biju Sena

Preceded by Harekrushna Mahatab (1st term); Hemananda Biswal (2nd term)	Chief Minister of Odisha; 28 June 1961 to 2 October 1963 (1st term); 5 March 1990 to 15 March 1995 (2nd term)	Succeeded by Biren Mitra (1st term); Janaki Ballabh Pattanaik (2nd term)
