= Somnath Rath =

Indian politician (1924–2013)

Member of Parliament, Lok Sabha
- In office 1984–1989
- Preceded by: Ramchandra Rath
- Succeeded by: Ananta Narayan Singh Deo
- Constituency: Aska, Odisha

Personal details
- Born: 17 February 1924 Badagada, Ganjam district, Odisha, British India
- Died: 7 October 2013 (aged 89)
- Party: Indian National Congress
- Spouse: Anasuya Rath

Somnath Rath (17 February 1924 – 7 October 2013) was an Indian politician. He was elected to the Lok Sabha, the lower house of the Parliament of India as a member of the Indian National Congress.
