= Bishambhar Nath Pande =

Indian activist and politician

Governor of Odisha
- In office 17 August 1983 – 20 November 1988
- Preceded by: Cheppudira Muthana Poonacha
- Succeeded by: Saiyid Nurul Hasan

Personal details
- Born: 23 December 1906
- Died: 1 June 1998 (aged 91)
- Citizenship: India
- Occupation: Politician

Bishambhar Nath Pande (23 December 1906 – 1 June 1998) was a freedom fighter, social worker, writer, ideological historical negationist and parliamentarian in India. Pande devoted his life to the cause of national integration, and to the spread of the Gandhian way of life.

== Life ==
B. N. Pande was a member of the Indian National Congress and a close associate of Jawaharlal Nehru, the first prime minister of the Republic of India, as well as of Indira Gandhi, Rajiv Gandhi and Sonia Gandhi. He pursued a Gandhian philosophy and was for 18 years vice-chairman of the Gandhi Smriti and Darshan Samiti (GSDS), which aims to spread Gandhian principles and philosophy globally.

Pande gave lectures in countries such as Japan, Russia, Germany and Canada on the life and ideals of Mohandas K. Gandhi.

== Awards ==
In 1976, Pande was awarded the Padma Shri for his achievements in the field of social work.

Pande was awarded the Indira Gandhi Award for National Integration by then Indian prime minister P. V. Narasimha Rao in 1996 for his lifetime achievements in the field of Hindu-Muslim unity in India. He was also awarded the Khuda Baksh Award for his contribution to the composite culture of India.

== Political career ==
- Member of the Legislative Assembly, 1952–53
- Mayor of Allahabad 1948–52
- Member of Parliament in the Rajya Sabha (upper house), 1976 to 1984 and 1989 to 1998
- President of the Pradesh Congress Committee, Uttar Pradesh, 1980 to 1983
- Governor of Odisha, 1984 to 1988

== Books ==
Pande devoted a major part of his life to research on secularism with the objective of promoting unity amongst all religions in India. As part of his research, he wrote several books, including:

- Centenary history of the Indian National Congress 1885–1985
- A Concise History of the Indian National Congress, 1947–1985 (1986)
- Indira Gandhi
- Islam and Indian culture
- Aurangzeb

== Family ==
Pande was married to Shanta Pande (d. 2000), a former freedom fighter. He had one child, Nandita Rao, and two grandchildren, Probir and Rahul Rao. He also has four great-granddaughters: Niharika, Sudiksha, Sanaaya and Advika Rao.

Preceded by Cheppudira Muthana Poonacha	Governor of Odisha; 1983–1988	Succeeded by Saiyid Nurul Hasan
