= Janata Party (Secular) =

- Abbreviation: JP(S)
- Founder: Raj Narain
- Founded: July 1979
- Split from: Janata Party
- Merged into: Lokdal (1980); Janata Dal (1988)
- Ideology: Social democracy
- Political position: Centre-left

The Janata Party (Secular) was an Indian political party founded by Raj Narain in July 1979.

On 16 July 1979, Chaudhary Charan Singh assumed its leadership and became the Prime Minister of India on 28 July 1979 with the support of the Indian National Congress (I) but resigned on 20 August 1979 after their withdrawal of support. The Janata Party led by Charan Singh was later renamed as Lok Dal before the 1980 Indian general election but officially contested the elections under its previous name. In the elections for the 7th Lok Sabha in 1980, the party won 41 seats and received 9.39% of the total votes polled.

In 1980 the party was merged into the Lok Dal, that would form, along with other parties, the Janata Dal in 1988.

== See also ==
- Janata Party
- Lokdal
