= Bhajaman Behara =

Indian politician

Member of Parliament, Lok Sabha
- In office 1989–1991
- Preceded by: Kamakhya Prasad Singh Deo
- Succeeded by: Kamakhya Prasad Singh Deo
- Constituency: Dhenkanal, Odisha

Personal details
- Born: 1 November 1943 (age 82) Bagdia, Dhenkanal District, Orissa, British India
- Party: Janata Dal

Bhajaman Behara is an Indian politician, belonging to Janata Dal. In the 1989 election he was elected to the Lok Sabha from Dhenkanal in Odisha and he was Union Minister of State, Petroleum & Chemicals.
