= Lok Bhavan, Bhubaneswar =

Official residence of the Governor of Odisha

Coordinates: 20.271327°N 85.817635°E

- ରାଜଭବନ, ଭୁବନେଶ୍ୱର
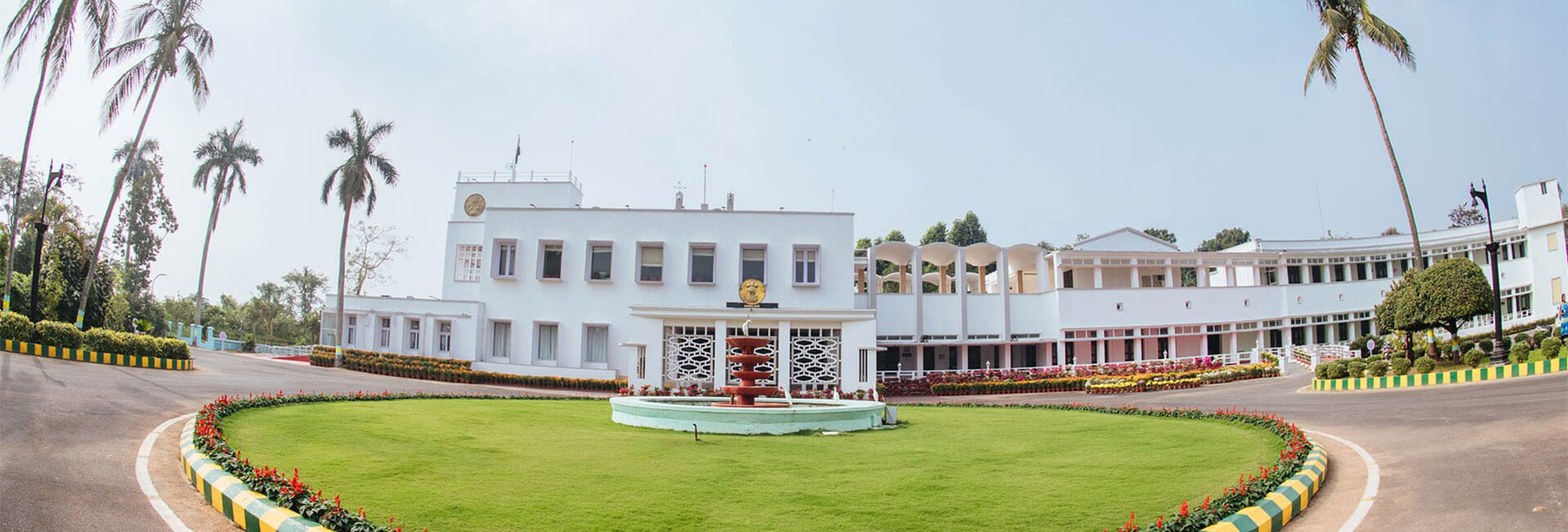
- Lok Bhavan Odisha main building

- Location within Odisha

General information
- Current tenants: Kamphabati Hari Babu
- Completed: 31st March, 1960

References
- RAJ BHAVAN ODISHA

Lok Bhavan formerly Raj Bhavan of Bhubaneswar is the official residence of the Governor of Odisha. It is located in the city of Bhubaneswar, Odisha. It currently tenanted by Kambhapati Hari Babu.

== History ==
The construction of Raj Bhavan started on 1 January 1958 under the architect Julius Vaz. The land area is about 88 acres.

The 9th governor of Odisha, Sri Y. N. Sukthankar, was the first governor to stay here. Since then it has been the official residence of the governor.
