= Janaki Ballabh Patnaik =

Politician from Odisha, India (1927–2015)

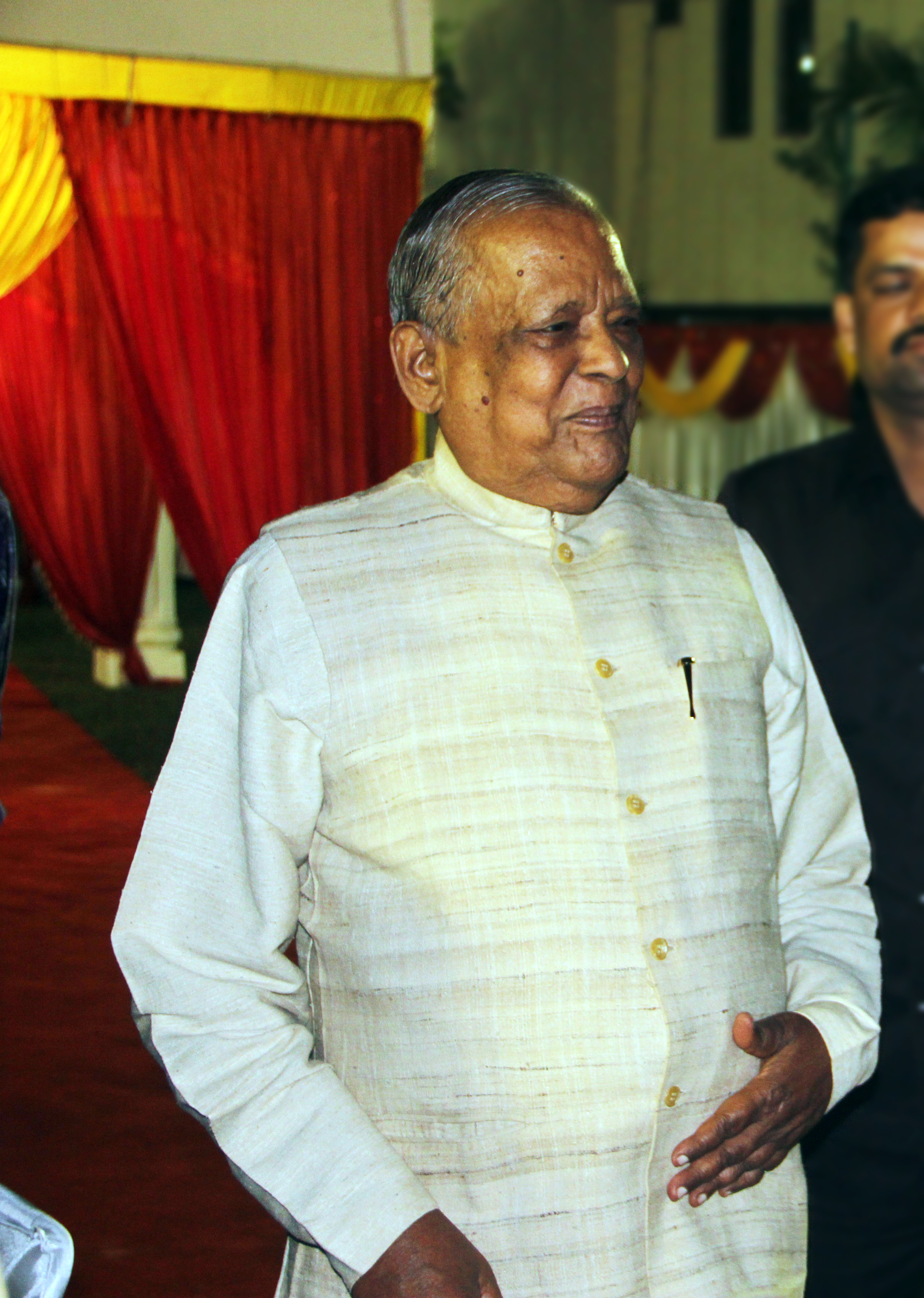
- Janaki Ballabh Patnaik in 2009

25th Governor of Assam
- In office 11 December 2009 – 10 December 2014
- Chief Minister: Tarun Gogoi
- Preceded by: Syed Sibtey Razi
- Succeeded by: Padmanabha Acharya

11th Chief Minister of Odisha
- In office 15 March 1995 – 17 February 1999
- Preceded by: Biju Patnaik
- Succeeded by: Giridhar Gamang
- In office 9 June 1980 – 7 December 1989
- Preceded by: Nilamani Routray
- Succeeded by: Hemananda Biswal

Union Minister of Tourism, Civil Aviation and Labour
- In office 16 January 1980 – 7 June 1980

President of Indian Youth Congress, Odisha state unit
- In office 1950–n/a

Member Of odisha legislative assembly
- In office 1980–2009

Personal details
- Born: 3 January 1927 Rameshwar, Bihar and Orissa Province, British India
- Died: 21 April 2015 (aged 88) Tirupati, Andhra Pradesh, India
- Party: Indian National Congress
- Spouse: Jayanti Patnaik
- Children: Pruthvi Ballabh Patnaik (son); Sudatta Patnaik (daughter); Supriya Patnaik (daughter)
- Parent: Gokulananda Patnaik (father)
- Relatives: Soumya Ranjan Patnaik (son in law)
- Education: Ravenshaw University; Utkal University; Banaras Hindu University
- Website: Official website

Janaki Ballabh Patnaik (3 January 1927 – 21 April 2015) was an Indian politician who had been 25th Governor of Assam from 2009 to 2014. A leader of the Indian National Congress, he was Chief Minister of Odisha from 1980 to 1989 and again from 1995 to 1999, holding that post for the longest time on record before Naveen Patnaik. In 1950, he became the President of the Odisha state unit of the youth wing of the Congress. In 1980, he became the Union Minister for Tourism, Civil Aviation and Labour from 16 January to 7 June.

== Personal life ==
He was born in a humble Karan family. His father Gokulananda Patnaik was a reputed writer and teacher. He married Jayanti Patnaik in 1953, a four-time Member of Parliament and first Chairperson of National Commission for Women. He completed his schooling from Khurda High School, he graduated in Sanskrit (Honours) from Utkal University in 1947 and received his master's degree in political science from the Banaras Hindu University in 1949.

He was accused of involvement in the Anjana Mishra case.

== Death ==
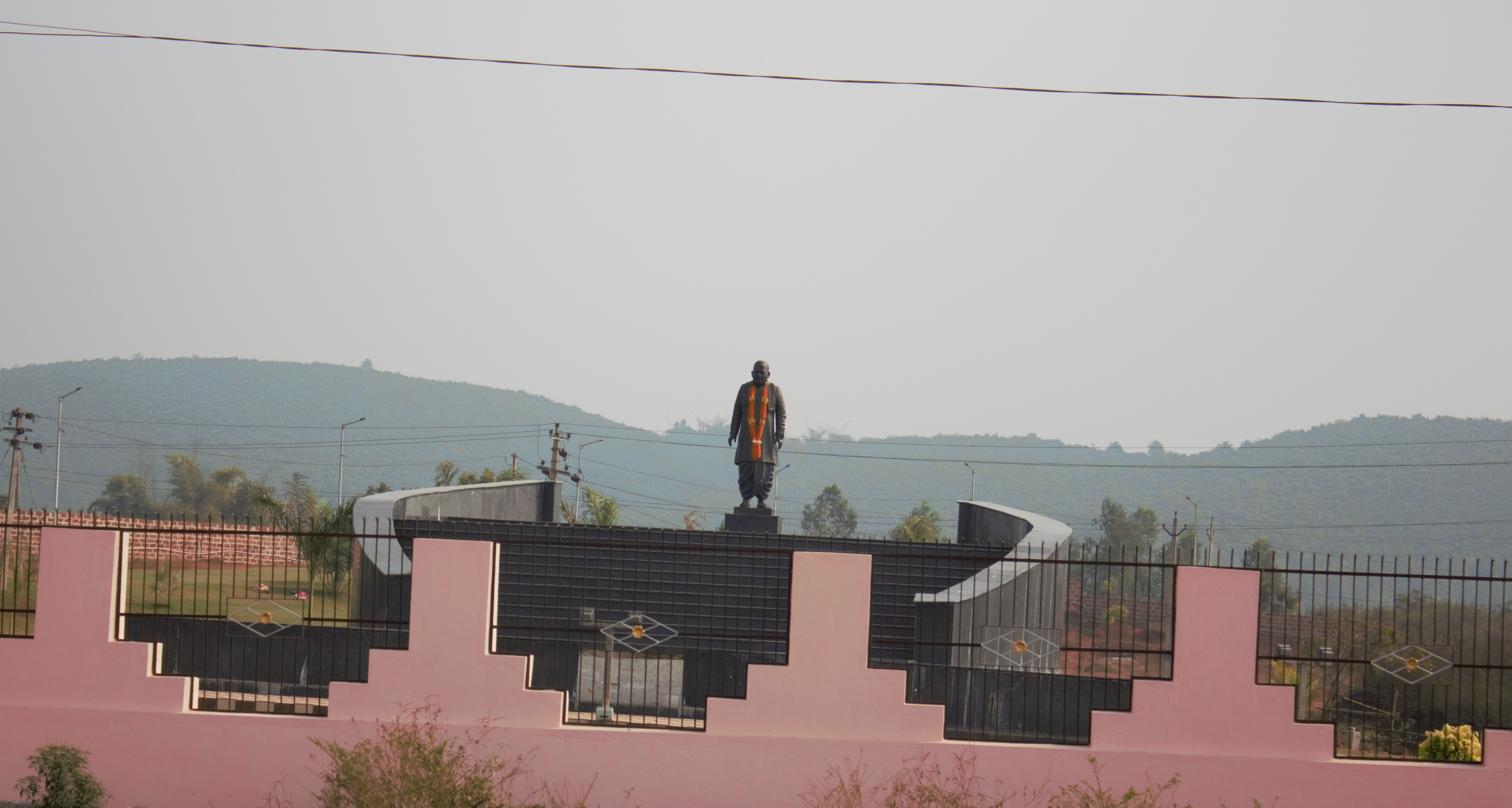
Janaki Patnaik's statue in JB Patnaik memorial park, Khordha.

He died on Tuesday, 21 April 2015, aged 88 at Tirupati in Andhra Pradesh. On Monday, 20 April 2015, he had gone to attend the convocation of Rashtriya Sanskrit Vidyapeetha, of which he was chancellor, and also visited the Lord Venkateswara Temple, Tirumala. Later in the night, he complained of severe chest pain and was subsequently shifted to Sri Venkateswara Institute of Medical Sciences (SVIMS) where he died at around 3:00 am. on 21 April. He leaves behind a legacy of having translated the Mahabharata, the Ramayana and the Bhagavad Gita into Odia (his mother tongue), as he was a Sanskrit-Odia scholar.

Government offices
Preceded by Syed Sibtey Razi	Governor of Assam; 2009-2014	Succeeded by Padmanabha Acharya
Preceded by Nilamani Routray(1st term); Biju Pattanaik(3rd term)	Chief Minister of Odisha; 9 June 1980 to 7 December 1989 (1st & 2nd term); 15 March 1995 to 17 February 1999 (3rd term)	Succeeded by Hemananda Biswal(2nd term); Giridhar Gamang(3rd term)
