= Nabarangpur Lok Sabha constituency =

Lok Sabha constituency in Odisha

Coordinates: 19.23°N 82.55°E

Nabarangpur (ST) OD-12
- Lok Sabha constituency
- Interactive Map Outlining Nabarangpur Lok Sabha constituency

Constituency details
- Country: India
- Region: East India
- State: Odisha
- Assembly constituencies: Umerkote; Jharigam; Nabarangpur; Dabugam; Kotpad; Malkangiri; Chitrakonda
- Established: 1952
- Total electors: 15,14,610 (Note: as on 2024) (Note: as data published by election commission)
- Reservation: ST

Member of Parliament
- 18th Lok Sabha
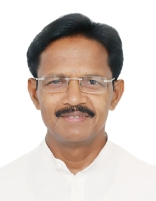
- Incumbent Balabhadra Majhi
- Party: BJP
- Elected year: 2024

Nabarangpur Lok Sabha constituency (formerly known as Nowrangpur Lok Sabha constituency) is one of the 21 Lok Sabha (parliamentary) constituencies in Odisha state in eastern India. It was one of the safe seat of Indian National Congress as Khagapati Pradhani represented this seat for a record 9 times from 1967 to 1998.

== Assembly Segments ==
Before delimitation in 2008, the legislative assembly segments which constituted this parliamentary constituency were: Malkangiri, Chitrakonda, Kotpad, Nabarangpur, Kodinga, Dabugam and Umerkote.

Following delimitation, at present, this constituency comprises the following legislative assembly segments:

#	Name	District	Member	Party	Leading (in 2024)
73	Umerkote (ST)	Nabarangpur	Nityananda Gond	BJP	BJP
74	Jharigam (ST)	Nabarangpur	Narsing Bhatra	BJP	BJP
75	Nabarangpur (ST)	Nabarangpur	Gouri Shankar Majhi	BJP	BJP
76	Dabugam (ST)	Nabarangpur	Manohar Randhari	BJD	BJD
142	Kotpad (ST)	Koraput	Rupu Bhatra	BJP	BJP
146	Malkangiri (ST)	Malkangiri	Narasinga Madkami	BJP	BJP
147	Chitrakonda (ST)	Malkangiri	Mangu Khilla	INC	INC

== Elected members ==
Vote share of winning candidates
2024	38.74%
2019	33.78%
2014	36.57%
2009	38.93%
2004	46.11%
1999	50.78%
1998	50.06%
1996	58.04%
1991	48.11%
1989	50.48%
1984	71.53%
1980	59.21%
1977	51.14%
1971	41.90%

Since its formation in 1952, 17 elections have been held till date.

List of elected members from Nabarangpur constituency are:

Year	Member	Party
1952	Ponnada Subba Rao	Ganatantra Parishad
1957-1961 : Constituency did not exist
1962	R Jagannath Rao	Indian National Congress
1967	Khagapati Pradhani	Indian National Congress
1971	Khagapati Pradhani	Indian National Congress
1977	Khagapati Pradhani	Indian National Congress
1980	Khagapati Pradhani	Indian National Congress (I)
1984	Khagapati Pradhani	Indian National Congress
1989	Khagapati Pradhani	Indian National Congress
1991	Khagapati Pradhani	Indian National Congress
1996	Khagapati Pradhani	Indian National Congress
1998	Khagapati Pradhani	Indian National Congress
1999	Parsuram Majhi	Bharatiya Janata Party
2004	Parsuram Majhi	Bharatiya Janata Party
2009	Pradeep Kumar Majhi	Indian National Congress
2014	Balabhadra Majhi	Biju Janata Dal
2019	Ramesh Chandra Majhi	Biju Janata Dal
2024	Balabhadra Majhi	Bharatiya Janata Party

== Election results ==
=== 2024 ===
Voting were held on 13th May 2024 in 4th phase of Indian General Election. Counting of votes was on 4th June 2024. In 2024 election, Bharatiya Janata Party candidate Balabhadra Majhi defeated Biju Janata Dal candidate Pradeep Kumar Majhi by a margin of 87,536 votes.

2024 Indian general election: Nabarangpur
Party	Candidate	Votes	%	±%
BJP	Balabhadra Majhi	481,396	38.74	▲9.24
BJD	Pradeep Kumar Majhi	3,93,860	31.70	▼2.08
INC	Bhujabal Majhi	3,03,392	24.42	▼5.78
NOTA	None of the above	43,268	3.48	
Majority		87,536	7.04	
Turnout		12,50,175	82.54	▲3.02
BJP gain from BJD				

=== 2019 ===
In 2019 election, Biju Janata Dal candidate Ramesh Chandra Majhi defeated Indian National Congress candidate Pradeep Kumar Majhi by a margin of 41,634 votes.

2019 Indian general elections: Nabarangpur
Party	Candidate	Votes	%	±%
BJD	Ramesh Chandra Majhi	392,504	33.78	▼2.79
INC	Pradeep Kumar Majhi	3,50,870	30.20	▼6.17
BJP	Balabhadra Majhi	3,42,839	29.50	▲15.96
NOTA	None of the above	44,582	3.84	
BSP	Chandradhwaj Majhi	28,905	2.49	
Majority		41,634	3.58	
Turnout		11,61,787	79.52	
BJD hold				

=== 2014 ===
In 2014 election, Biju Janata Dal candidate Balabhadra Majhi defeated Indian National Congress candidate Pradeep Kumar Majhi by a margin of 2,042 votes. NOTA received 44,408 votes (5%) which is significantly higher than the victory margin.

2014 Indian general elections: Nabarangpur
Party	Candidate	Votes	%	±%
BJD	Balabhadra Majhi	373,887	36.57	
INC	Pradeep Kumar Majhi	3,71,845	36.37	
BJP	Parsuram Majhi	1,38,430	13.54	
NOTA	None of the above	44,408	4.34	
BSP	Gopinath Jani	31,707	3.10	
OJM	Arjun Bhatra	24,832	2.42	
AOP	Gopal Pujari	18,675	1.82	
Independent	Chandradhwaja Majhi	18,388	1.79	
Majority		2,042	0.20	
Turnout		10,22,187	78.80	
BJD gain from INC				

=== 2009 ===
In 2009 election, Indian National Congress candidate Pradeep Kumar Majhi defeated Biju Janata Dal candidate Domburu Majhi by a margin of 29,977 votes.

2009 Indian general elections: Nabarangpur
Party	Candidate	Votes	%	±%
INC	Pradeep Kumar Majhi	308,307	38.93	
BJD	Domburu Majhi	2,78,330	35.15	
BJP	Parsuram Majhi	1,56,784	19.80	
BSP	Chandradhwaja Majhi	48,514	6.13	
Majority		29,977	3.79	
Turnout		7,91,935	65.14	
INC hold				
