= Papadahandi =

Papadahandi Papadahandi
- Town
- Location in Odisha, India Papadahandi (India)
- Coordinates: 19.323374°N 82.517524°E
- Country: India
- State: Odisha
- District: Nabarangpur

Languages
  - Official: Odia
- Time zone: UTC+5:30 (IST)
- Vehicle registration: OD
- Lok Sabha constituency: Nabarangpur
- Vidhan Sabha constituency: Nabarangpur
- Website: odisha.gov.in

Papadahandi is a small town located in Nabarangpur district of Odisha, India. It is the block headquarters of Papadahandi block. Papadahandi is situated on National Highway number 201. It is famous for the Ancient Shiva temple and the Champa garden having hundreds of Champa tree. The Sahid Minar located on the bank of Turi river is a memorial.

== Politics ==
Papadahandi comes under Nabarangpur (Odisha Vidhan Sabha constituency) and Nabarangpur (Lok Sabha constituency).

Current MLA for Nabarangpur (Odisha Vidhan Sabha constituency) is Sadasiva Pradhani from BJD.

Current MP for Nabarangpur (Lok Sabha constituency) is Ramesh Chandra Majhi from BJD.

== Culture ==
For the local people, Dussehra is one of the major festival that has been celebrated in the month of Ashvina. Every year during the time of Dussehra peoples from the neighboring villages come here to see the Durga Puja Pandals and get blessings of Goddess Durga. For the development and renovation of Sri Nilakantheswar Mahadev Temple, recently Govt. of Odisha has approved for the opening of Pilgrim Amenities and community centre at Papadahandi Block.
