= Ramesh Chandra Majhi =

Indian politician (born 1978)

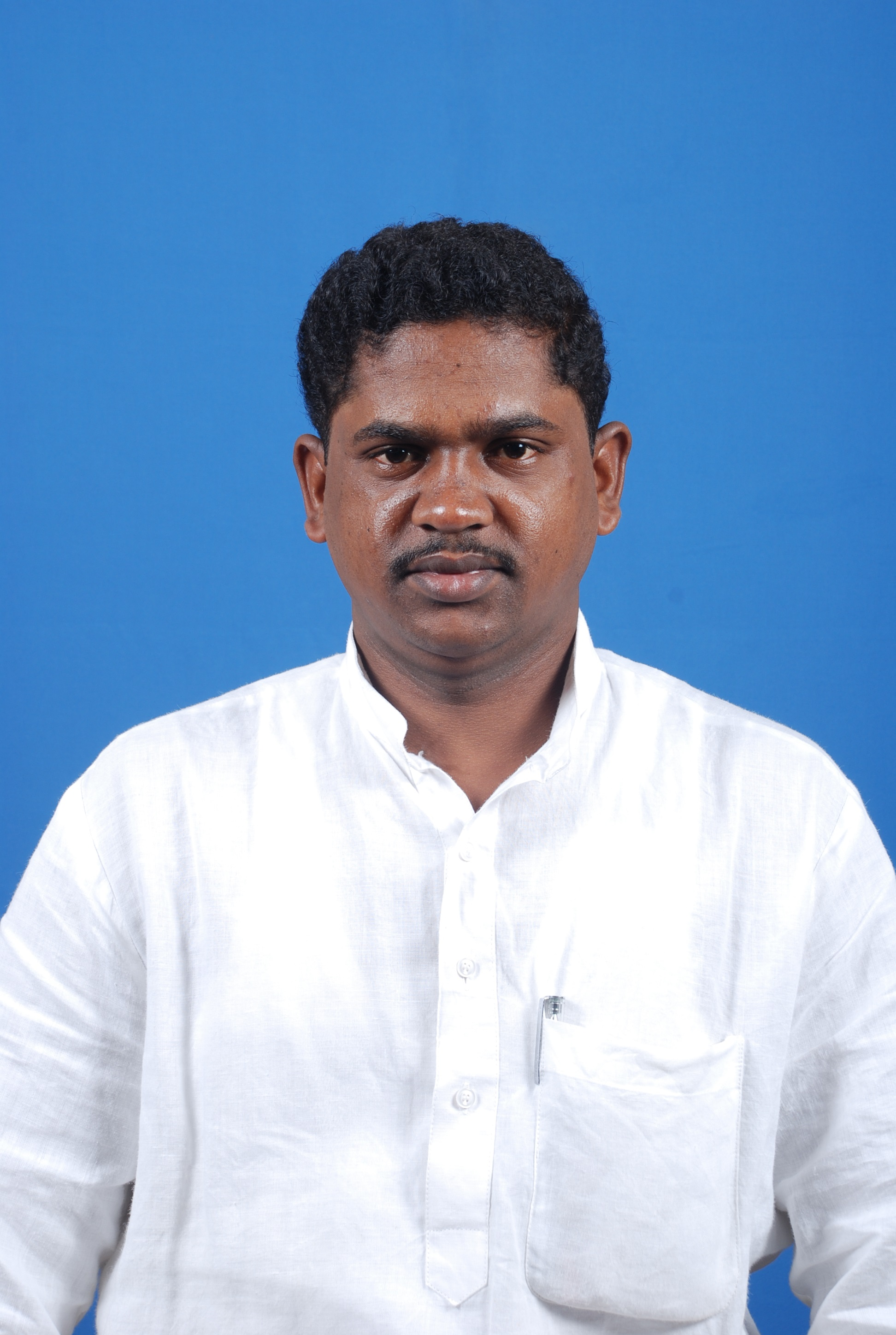
- Portrait of Ramesh Chandra Majhi

Member of Indian Parliament (Lok Sabha)
- In office 2019–2024
- Preceded by: Balabhadra Majhi
- Succeeded by: Balabhadra Majhi
- Constituency: Nabarangpur

Member of Odisha Legislative Assembly
- In office 2009–2014
- Preceded by: new seat
- Succeeded by: Prakash Chandra Majhi
- Constituency: Jharigam

Member of Odisha Legislative Assembly
- In office 2004–2009
- Preceded by: Bhujabal Majhi
- Succeeded by: Bhujabal Majhi
- Constituency: Dabugam

Personal details
- Born: 9 April 1978 (age 48)
- Party: Biju Janata Dal
- Relatives: Prakash Chandra Majhi (brother)
- Profession: Politician

Ramesh Chandra Majhi (born 9 April 1978) is an Indian politician. He was elected to the Lok Sabha, lower house of the Parliament of India from Nabarangpur, Odisha in the 2019 Indian general election as a member of the Biju Janata Dal. He is Ex Cabinet Minister for ST & SC Development, Minorities & Backward Classes Welfare, Panchayatraj Department in Government of Odisha.

== Early life and education ==
Ramesh Chandra Majhi was born to Jadav Majhi and Balamati Majhi on 9 April 1978 in Dandamunda village under Chandahandi tehsil in Nabarangpur district. He has one brother and three sisters. Due to his involvement in politics at a very young age, the lack of attention to his study interrupted his higher studies and further education. Even after holding the post of Minister of State (Ind) for Information and Technology, Majhi was not a graduate; he did not pass his +2 exams until April 2011. In 2011 he appeared for his +2(Arts) examination under the Council of Higher Secondary Education, Orissa.

== Career ==
At the age of 20, Majhi became chairman of Chandahandi Block, at 25 Zilla Parishad member, at 27 youngest legislator of the State and at 31 Minister after being re-elected to the State Assembly.

1. Entered Politics during the tenure of late Biju Patnaik
2. Jan. 1997: Elected as Panchayat Samiti Member of "Dhodipani" Gram Panchayat under Chandahandi Block.
3. Elected as chairman, Panchayat Samiti of Chandahandi, Dist.-Nabarangpur
4. Elected as State Executive Member of B.J.D., Orissa
5. Feb. 2002: Elected as Zilla Parishad Member of Chandahandi.

== Assembly & Parliament Membership ==
1. Member of Orissa Legislative Assembly from 2004 to 2009 (13th). Elected from Dabugam and contested from Biju Janata Dal party.
2. Member of Orissa Legislative Assembly from 2009 to date (14th). Elected from Jharigam and contested from Biju Janata Dal party.

Loksabha

1. Member of Parliament From 2019 Loksabha from Nabarangpur and contested from Biju Janata Dal Party
