= Pradeep Kumar Majhi =

Indian politician (born 1976)

Pradeep Majhi
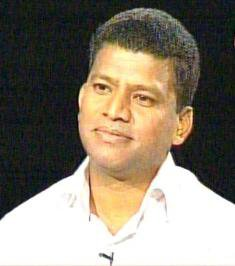
- Pradeep Majhi

Member: 15th Lok Sabha
- In office 2009–2014
- Preceded by: Parsuram Majhi
- Succeeded by: Balabhadra Majhi
- Constituency: Nabarangpur

President Orissa Youth Congress
- In office 2009–2011

Secretary Indian Youth Congress
- In office 2007–2009

President Zila Parishad Nabarangpur
- In office 2007–2009

Personal details
- Born: 22 February 1976 (age 50)
- Party: Biju Janta Dal (since 2021)
- Other political affiliations: Indian National Congress(before 2021)
- As of 28 August, 2014

Pradeep Majhi (Odia: ପ୍ରଦୀପ ମାଝି; born 22 February 1976) is an Indian politician. He was a member of parliament in 15th Lok Sabha from Nabarangpur and was the State Vice-president of Odisha Pradesh Congress Committee, having held previous offices of State President of Orissa Pradesh Youth Congress, Secretary of the Indian Youth Congress, and President of Zilla Parishad. In 15th Lok Sabha, he asked 1160 questions inside Parliament, the third-highest number questions asked in that Lok Sabha tenure. He asked 501 questions in his first two years, according to The Week magazine. In 2021, Majhi quit from Congress and joined BJD in a Mishran Parba.

== Political career ==
Majhi is among the young leaders of National Congress Party. He is very close to Rahul Gandhi, who is the party's working president and also in charge of the Youth Congress affairs. Majhi from Orissa was appointed as the secretary of Indian Youth Congress, and this was the first time a person from Orissa has been elevated to this post. While the UPA 2 government was all set to complete two years, prominent "Week' magazine came up with detailed statistics that Congress MP from Nabarangpur, Mr Majhi has set a new record. The first-timer Lok Sabha MP asked 501 questions in two years with 75% attendance in Parliament irrespective of his additional Orissa Youth Congress responsibilities.

=== Orissa Youth Congress president ===
Orissa Youth Congress had advanced under his leadership and guidance in conduct, agitations and movements, infusion of new members in party carder and significantly promoting Rahul Gandhi's vision and message to youth across the state.

=== 2009 Lok Sabha Elections ===
He was nominated by the Congress party to contest the Lok Sabha elections 2009 from Nabarangpur in Odisha. He won the 2009 Lok Sabha election by a margin of 30830 votes. During his tenure as a parliamentarian among others he played a decisive role in Food Corporation of India procuring maize at MSP from Nabarangpur farmers.

== Biju Janata Dal ==
and joined BJD in a Mishran Parba.
