= Khagapati Pradhani =

Indian politician (1922–2010)

Member of Parliament, Lok Sabha
- In office 1967-1999
- Preceded by: Jagannath Rao
- Succeeded by: Parsuram Majhi
- Constituency: Nowrangpur, Odisha

Personal details
- Born: 15 July 1922 Koraput, Odisha, British India
- Died: 3 February 2010 (aged 87) Nabrangpur, Odisha
- Party: Indian National Congress
- Spouse: Jasoda Pradhani
- Children: 4 sons and 3 daughters

Khagapati Pradhani (15 July 1922 - 3 February 2010) was an Indian politician belonging to the Indian National Congress and he was elected 9 times to the Lower House of the Indian Parliament the Lok Sabha in 1967, 1971, 1977, 1980, 1984, 1989, 1991, 1996 and 1998 from Nowrangpur constituency of Odisha.
