= Nabarangpur Assembly constituency =

Constituency of the Odisha legislative assembly in India

Coordinates: 19.23°N 82.55°E

Nabarangpur
- Constituency No. 75 for the Odisha Legislative Assembly

Constituency details
- Country: India
- Region: East India
- State: Odisha
- Division: Southern Division
- District: Nabarangpur
- Lok Sabha constituency: Nabarangpur
- Established: 1951
- Total electors: 2,34,183 (Note: as on 2024) (Note: as data published by election commission)
- Reservation: ST

Member of Legislative Assembly
- 17th Odisha Legislative Assembly
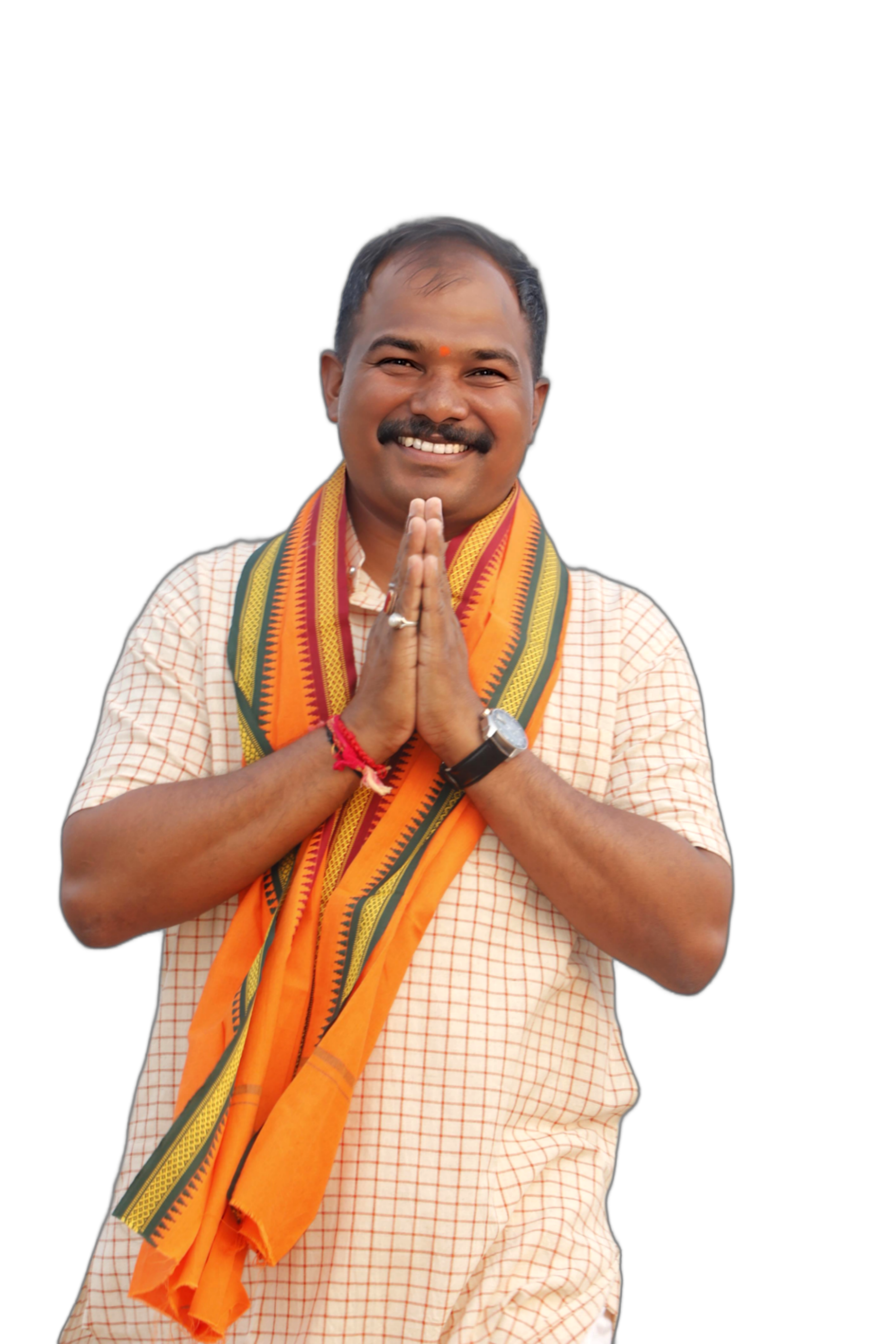
- Incumbent Gouri Shankar Majhi
- Party: Bhartiya Janata Party
- Elected year: 2024

Nabarangpur is a Vidhan Sabha constituency of Nabarangpur district, Odisha.

This constituency includes Nabarangpur, Nabarangpur block, Tentulikhunti block, Nandahandi block and 10 Gram panchayats (Madiagam, Chirma, Badambada, Panduguda, Kukudisemla, Rajoda, Bamuni, Sanambada, Binjili and Ukiapali) of Kosagumuda block.

== Elected members ==
Vote share of winning candidates
2024	45.35%
2019	34.58%
2014	44.36%
2009	36.41%
2004	49.31%
2000	60.90%
1995	57.80%
1990	48.54%
1985	76.09%
1980	75.75%
1977	55.73%

Since its formation in 1951, 18 elections were held till date including in one bypoll in 1960. It was a 2 member constituency for 1952 & 1957.

List of members elected from Nabarangpur constituency are:

Year	Member	Party
2024	Gouri Shankar Majhi	Bharatiya Janata Party
2019	Sadasiva Pradhani	Biju Janata Dal
2014	Manohar Randhari	Biju Janata Dal
2009	Manohar Randhari	Biju Janata Dal
2004	Habibulla Khan	Indian National Congress
2000	Habibulla Khan	Indian National Congress
1995	Habibulla Khan	Indian National Congress
1990	Habibulla Khan	Indian National Congress
1985	Habibulla Khan	Indian National Congress
1980	Habibulla Khan	Indian National Congress (I)
1977	Habibulla Khan	Indian National Congress
1974	Habibulla Khan	Swatantra Party
1971	Habibulla Khan	Swatantra Party
1967	Sadasiva Tripathy	Indian National Congress
1961	Harijan Miru	Indian National Congress
1960 (bypoll) (Note: Resignation of Sadasiba Tripathy)	Jagannath Tripathy	Indian National Congress
1957 (Note: It was a 2 member constituency)	Harijan Miru	Indian National Congress
1957	Sadasiba Tripathy	Indian National Congress
1951 (Note: It was a 2 member constituency)	Mudi Naiko	Indian National Congress
1951	Sadasiba Tripathy	Indian National Congress
1946	Sadasiba Tripathy	Indian National Congress
1937	Sadasiba Tripathy	Indian National Congress

== Election results ==
=== 2024 ===
Voting were held on 13th May 2024 in 1st phase of Odisha Assembly Election & 4th phase of Indian General Election. Counting of votes was on 4th June 2024. In 2024 election, Bharatiya Janata Party candidate Gouri Shankar Majhi defeated Biju Janata Dal candidate Kausalya Pradhani by a margin of 25,094 votes.

2024 Odisha Vidhan Sabha Election, Nabarangpur
Party	Candidate	Votes	%	±%
BJP	Gouri Shankar Majhi	90,895	45.35	▲14.37
BJD	Kausalya Pradhani	65,801	32.83	▼1.75
INC	Dillip Kumar Pradhani	40,271	20.09	▼9.09
NOTA	None of the above	3,472	1.73	▼0.31
Majority		25,094	12.52	▲8.92
Turnout		2,00,439	85.59	
BJP gain from BJD				

=== 2019 ===
In 2019 election, Biju Janata Dal candidate Sadasiva Pradhani defeated Bharatiya Janata Party candidate Gouri Shankar Majhi by a margin of 6,064 votes.

2019 Odisha Legislative Assembly election: Nabarangpur
Party	Candidate	Votes	%	±%
BJD	Sadasiva Pradhani	58,335	34.58	
BJP	Gouri Shankar Majhi	52,271	30.98	
INC	Sadan Nayak	49,232	29.18	
NOTA	None of the above	3,439	2.04%	
Majority		6,064	3.60	
Turnout		1,87,789	81.13	
BJD hold				

=== 2014 ===
In 2014 election, Biju Janata Dal candidate Manohar Randhari defeated Indian National Congress candidate Sadan Nayak by a margin of 11,389 votes.

2014 Vidhan Sabha Election, Nabarangpur
Party	Candidate	Votes	%	±%
BJD	Manohar Randhari	76,659	44.36	▲7.95
INC	Sadan Nayak	65,270	37.77	▲3.72
BJP	Birendra Pujari	13,496	7.81	▼12.1
NOTA	None of the above	3,624	2.1	−
Majority		11,389	6.59	
Turnout		1,72,817	82.6	▲12.81
Registered electors		2,09,213		
BJD hold				

=== 2009 ===
In 2009 election, Biju Janata Dal candidate Manohar Randhari defeated Indian National Congress candidate Sadan Nayak by a margin of 3,334 votes.

2009 Vidhan Sabha Election, Nabarangpur
Party	Candidate	Votes	%	±%
BJD	Manohar Randhari	51,448	36.41	−
INC	Sadan Nayak	48,114	34.05	−
BJP	Manjula Majhi	28,135	19.91	−
Majority		3,334	2.36 (Note: % of total valid votes)	−
Turnout		1,41,312	69.79	▼0.3'"`UNIQ−−ref−00000053−QINU`"'
BJD gain from INC				
