= Ponnada =

Ponnada (Telugu: పొన్నాడ) is a Telugu surname. Notable people with the surname include:

- Ponnada Pujita (born 1989), Indian actress known professionally as Pujita Ponnada
- Ponnada Subba Rao (born 1889), Indian politician and lawyer
- Ponnada Venkata Satish Kumar (born 1974), Indian politician
