= Laxman Gouda =

Indian politician

Member: Odisha Legislative Assembly
- In office 1952–1957
- Constituency: Malkangiri

Member: Odisha Legislative Assembly
- In office 1957–1961
- Constituency: Padwa

Personal details
- Born: Malkangiri, Odisha, India
- Party: All India Ganatantra Parishad
- Spouse: Ramamani Nayak
- Parent: Balaram Nayak (father)
- Profession: Politician, Social Worker

Laxman Gouda was a Politician in Odisha. He has served as the Member of Legislative Assembly for Malkangiri and Padwa.
