= Balabhadra Majhi =

Member of the Lok Sabha

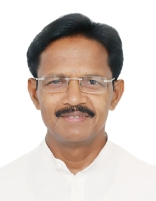
- Official Portrait

Member of Parliament, Lok Sabha
- Incumbent
- Assumed office 4 June 2024
- Preceded by: Ramesh Chandra Majhi
- In office 2014–2019
- Preceded by: Pradeep Kumar Majhi
- Succeeded by: Ramesh Chandra Majhi
- Constituency: Nabarangpur

Personal details
- Born: 9 February 1961 (age 65) Phataki, Nabarangapur district
- Party: Bharatiya Janata Party(2019-)
- Other political affiliations: Biju Janata Dal (2014-2019)
- Spouse: Amrita Majhi
- Children: Ritu Kumari, Samyak
- Education: B.Sc. (Engineering)-Civil
- Alma mater: NIT Rourkela
- Profession: Social Worker, Ex-Railway Servant

Balabhadra Majhi (9 February 1961) is an Indian politician. He is a Member of Parliament from Nabarangpur. He was also elected to the 16th Lok Sabha in 2014 from Nabarangpur constituency in Odisha. He is a member of the Bhartiya Janta Party since March 2019.

== Career ==
He graduated in B.Sc. (Engineering)-Civil, from NIT Rourkela and served as a chief engineer in Indian Railways until 2014, when he resigned from government service (wherein he had 7 years remaining for retirement) to contest the Lok Sabha elections for his constituency.

He was a member of the Biju Janata Dal political party and elected to the 16th Lok Sabha in 2014 from Nabarangpur constituency as member of the Biju Janata Dal candidate. But in 2019 Indian general election, Biju Janata Dal denied a ticket to him. He joined Bhartiya Janta Party in March 2019 and was given ticket from the same constituency but lost to state minister Ramesh Chandra Majhi of Biju Janata Dal. He fought the 2024 General Elections and won the Lok Sabha seat of Nabarangpur by defeating the BJD candidate Pradeep Kumar Majhi by 87,536 votes.

== See also ==
- Indian general election, 2014 (Odisha)
