= Jharigam Assembly constituency =

Constituency of the Odisha legislative assembly in India

Coordinates: 19.72°N 82.37°E

Jharigam
- Constituency No. 74 for the Odisha Legislative Assembly

Constituency details
- Country: India
- Region: East India
- State: Odisha
- Division: Southern Division
- District: Nabarangpur
- Lok Sabha constituency: Nabarangpur
- Established: 2009
- Total electors: 2,17,126 (Note: as on 2024) (Note: as data published by election commission)
- Reservation: ST

Member of Legislative Assembly
- 17th Odisha Legislative Assembly
- Incumbent Narsing Bhatra
- Party: Bharatiya Janata Party
- Elected year: 2024

Jharigam is an Odisha Legislative Assembly constituency in Nabarangpur district, Odisha.

This constituency includes Jharigam block, Chandahandi block and 10 Gram panchayats (Badabharandi, Badakumari, Bhamini, Benora, Singisari, Bhandariguda, Chikalpadar, Hirapur, Karagam and Rajpur) of Umerkote block.

The constituency was formed in 2008 Delimitation and went for polls in 2009 election.

== Elected members ==
Vote share of winning candidates
2024	42.33%
2019	44.58%
2014	41.99%
2009	45.72%

Since its formation in 2009, 4 elections were held till date.

List of members elected from Jharigam constituency are:

Year	Member	Party
2024	Narsing Bhatra	Bharatiya Janata Party
2019	Prakash Chandra Majhi	Biju Janata Dal
2014	Ramesh Chandra Majhi	Biju Janata Dal
2009	Ramesh Chandra Majhi	Biju Janata Dal

== Election results ==
=== 2024 ===
Voting were held on 13th May 2024 in 1st phase of Odisha Assembly Election & 4th phase of Indian General Election. Counting of votes was on 4th June 2024. In 2024 election, Bharatiya Janata Party candidate Narsing Bhatra defeated Biju Janata Dal candidate Ramesh Chandra Majhi by a margin of 3,278 votes.

2024 Vidhan Sabha Election, Jharigam
Party	Candidate	Votes	%	±%
BJP	Narsing Bhatra	76,748	42.33	▲19.64
BJD	Ramesh Chandra Majhi	73,470	40.52	▼4.06
INC	Harabati Gond	25,577	14.11	▼12.51
NOTA	None of the above	5,514	3.04	▼0.22
Majority		3,278	1.81	▼16.15
Turnout		1,81,309	83.5	
BJP gain from BJD				

=== 2019 ===
In 2019 election, Biju Janata Dal candidate Prakash Chandra Majhi defeated Indian National Congress candidate Uldhar Majhi by a margin of 31,370 votes.

2019 Vidhan Sabha Election, Jharigam
Party	Candidate	Votes	%	±%
BJD	Prakash Chandra Majhi	77,881	44.58	
INC	Uldhar Majhi	46,511	26.62	
BJP	Parsuram Majhi	39,631	22.69	
NOTA	None of the above	5,689	3.26	
Majority		31,370	17.96	
Turnout		1,74,696	82.24	
BJD hold				

=== 2014 ===
In 2014 election, Biju Janata Dal candidate Ramesh Chandra Majhi defeated Indian National Congress candidate Uldhar Majhi by a margin of 11,196 votes.

2014 Vidhan Sabha Election, Jharigam
Party	Candidate	Votes	%	±%
BJD	Ramesh Chandra Majhi	65,254	41.99	▼3.73
INC	Uldhar Majhi	54,058	34.78	▲7.66
BJP	Kumar Pujari	14,010	9.01	▼2.03
NOTA	None of the above	9,498	6.11	
Majority		11,196	7.20	▼11.4
Turnout		1,55,415	80.86	▲11.42
Registered electors		1,92,205		
BJD hold				

=== 2009 ===
In 2009 election, Biju Janata Dal candidate Ramesh Chandra Majhi defeated Indian National Congress candidate Jalandhar Majhi by a margin of 22,276 votes.

2009 Vidhan Sabha Election, Jharigam
Party	Candidate	Votes	%	±%
BJD	Ramesh Chandra Majhi	54,767	45.72	−
INC	Jalandhar Majhi	32,491	27.12	−
BJP	Sona Majhi	13,226	11.04	−
Majority		22,276	18.60 (Note: %of total valid votes)	−
Turnout		1,19,791	69.44	−
BJD win (new seat)				
