= Digisalapa =

Village in Odisha, India

Coordinates: 19.264945°N 82.704102°E

Digisalapa is a small village in the district of Nabarangpur in Odisha, India. It has a population of approximately 2,000 who are largely dependent on agriculture. The Siba Prasad High School is here.

The history of this place can be traced back to 16th century. The people of this village are largely dependent on agriculture as it is surrounded by highly fertile land. The main agricultural products are paddy, maize and sugar cane
