= Khatiguda =

- Town
- Location in Odisha, India Khatiguda (India)
- Coordinates: 19.2558°N 82.787°E
- Country: India
- State: Odisha
- District: Nabarangapur

Population (2001)
  - Total: 6,398

Languages
  - Official: Odia
- Time zone: UTC+5:30 (IST)
- Vehicle registration: OD
- Website: odisha.gov.in

Khatiguda is a census town in Nabarangapur district in the Indian state of Odisha.

== Demographics ==
As of 2001 India census, Khatiguda had a population of 6398. Males constitute 52% of the population and females 48%. Khatiguda has an average literacy rate of 70%, higher than the national average of 59.5%: male literacy is 78%, and female literacy is 61%. In Khatiguda, 12% of the population is under 6 years of age.
