= Indravati Dam =

Dam in km from Nabarangpur, Odisha, India

Indravati Dam ଇନ୍ଦ୍ରାବତୀ ଜଳବନ୍ଧ
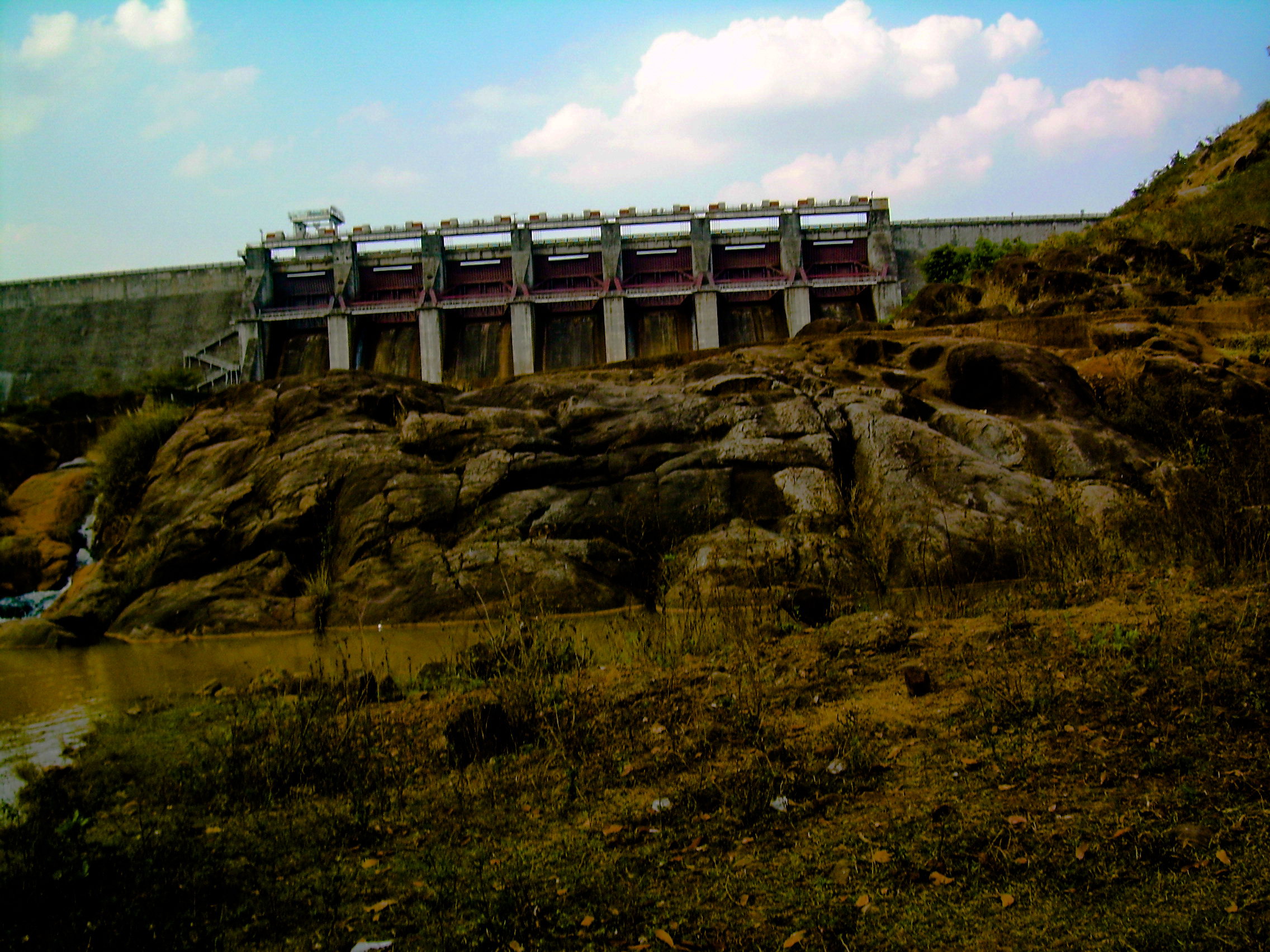
- Indravati Dam at Indravati Nadi (Nabarangpur)

- Location within India
- Official name: Upper Indravati Power Station
- Location: 40 km from Nabarangpur, Odisha
- Coordinates: 19°16′34.8″N 082°49′42.4″E
- Construction began: 1978
- Opening date: 2001

Dam and spillways
- Type of dam: Gravity, masonry
- Impounds: Indravati River
- Height: 45 m (148 ft)
- Length: 539 m (1,768 ft)

Reservoir
- Creates: Upper Indravati
- Total capacity: 2,300,000,000 m^{3} (1,900,000 acre⋅ft)
- Catchment area: 2,630 km^{2} (1,020 mi^{2})
- Surface area: 110 km^{2} (42 mi^{2})

Upper Indravati Power Station
- Coordinates: 19°25′37.2″N 082°51′22.7″E
- Operator: OHPC
- Commission date: 1999
- Turbines: 4 x 150 Francis-type
- Installed capacity: 600 MW

Indravati Dam is a gravity dam on the Indravati River a tributary of Godavari, about 40 km from Nabarangpur in the state of Odisha in India. It is connected to the main Indravati reservoir via 4.32 km long and 7 m dia head race tunnel designed for a discharge capacity of 210 cumecs and terminating in a surge shaft. Currently it is the largest power producing dam in eastern India with a capacity of 600 MW.

== Characteristics ==
The height of the Dam is 45 m (148 ft) and the length is 539 m (1,768 ft).

== History ==
Prior 1947 Late HH Maharaja PK Deo had already envisioned the project, and played a pivotal role afterwards. The main purpose of the dam was Hydroelectricity and irrigation. The project was operating and maintaining by Govt. of Odisha and Water Resources Department. The dam was completed by Govt. of Odisha in 1996.

== Hydroelectric Project ==
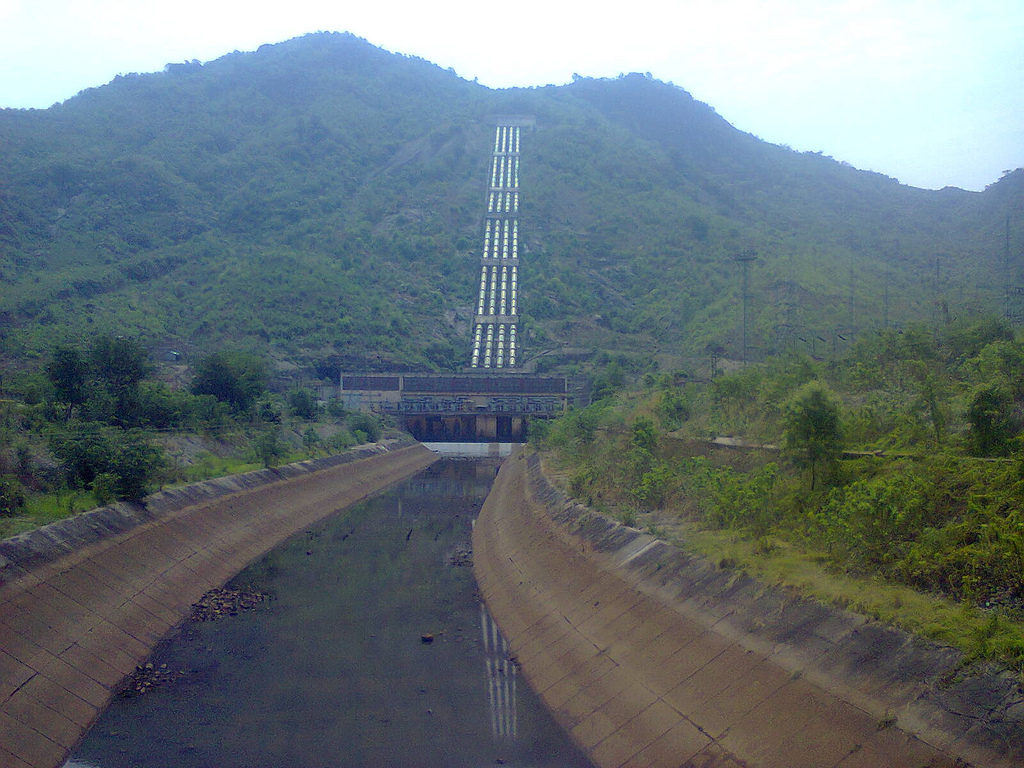
Upper Indravati Hydroelectric Project

The Upper Indravati Project envisages diversion of water of the Indravati river in its upper reaches into the Mahanadi river basin for power generation and irrigation. In addition to the power house, the project involved construction of 4 dams across the Indravati and its tributaries, 8 dykes and two inter-linking channels to form a single reservoir with a live capacity of 1,435.5 Million m^{3} and a barrage across Hati river in Mahanadi river basin.
