= Jagannath Rao =

Indian politician

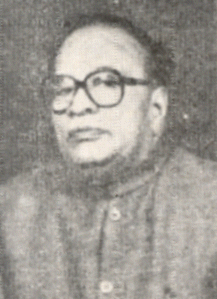
- Rao in 1957

Member of Parliament, Lok Sabha
- In office 1971–1989
- Preceded by: Ananta Tripathi Sarma
- Succeeded by: Gopinath Gajapati
- Constituency: Berhampur, Odisha
- In office 1957–1967
- Succeeded by: Khagapati Pradhani
- Constituency: Nowrangpur, Odisha

Personal details
- Born: 10 December 1909 Visakhapatnam, Madras Presidency, British India (now in Andhra Pradesh, India)
- Died: 30 January 1991 (aged 81) New Delhi, India
- Party: Indian National Congress
- Spouse: Janakiamma
- Children: 2 son and 5 daughters

Jagannath Rao (also known as Jagannath rao Chandriki) was a prominent Indian politician, freedom fighter, and veteran leader of the Indian National Congress. He played a significant role in the liberation movement of the Hyderabad-Karnataka region (now Kalyana Karnataka) and served as a Member of Parliament and a state minister in both the former Hyderabad State and Mysore State. He was born on 10th December 1909 and died on 30 January 1991. He was elected to the Lok Sabha, the lower house of the Parliament of India as a member of the Indian National Congress .

== Early life and education ==
Born in Chandriki village in the present-day Yadgir district of Karnataka, took his surname from his ancestral roots. His early life was defined by his role as a prominent student leader at Osmania University in Hyderabad during the 1930s and 1940s. He became a central figure in the historic Vande Mataram movement, leading student protests against the Nizam's administration for its restrictions on patriotic expressions. This political activism had a significant academic impact; he and several other student leaders were expelled from Osmania University. However, they were eventually able to complete their education at Nagpur University following a high-profile intervention by its Vice-Chancellor.

As a student Chandriki refused to apologise or retract their stance, resulting in his expulsion from Osmania University along with hundreds of others. However, many of the expelled students, including Chandriki, were later admitted to Nagpur University (with the support of its liberal‑minded Vice‑Chancellor T. J. Kedar), where they completed their higher education.

This period exposed him to wider nationalist networks, as many of the expelled students met national leaders such as Jawaharlal Nehru, Subhas Chandra Bose, and V. D. Savarkar, which deepened their commitment to the freedom struggle and the integration of Hyderabad State into the Indian Union.

== Legacy and historiographical notes ==
Modern academic studies on political movements in Kalyana Karnataka consistently highlight Jagannath Rao Chandriki as one of the foundational figures of the Hyderabad‑Karnataka freedom movement who emerged from the Vande Mataram agitation and later occupied an important place in post‑integration Congress politics.

Histories of the Hyderabad‑Karnataka region (1946–56 and 1935–48) note that many of the leading Kannadiga and Marathi‑Telugu leaders from Gulbarga, Yadgir, Raichur, and Bidar trace their political initiation to the Vande Mataram, Arya Samaj‑linked, and Congress‑organised satyagrahas in which Chandriki participated.

Because much of his career unfolded in regional politics, detailed biographical records are sparse, and most information comes from regional academic histories, Karnataka‑specific freedom‑movement studies, and occasional references in Congress‑related archives and South Indian political‑movement monographs.
