= Kotri River =

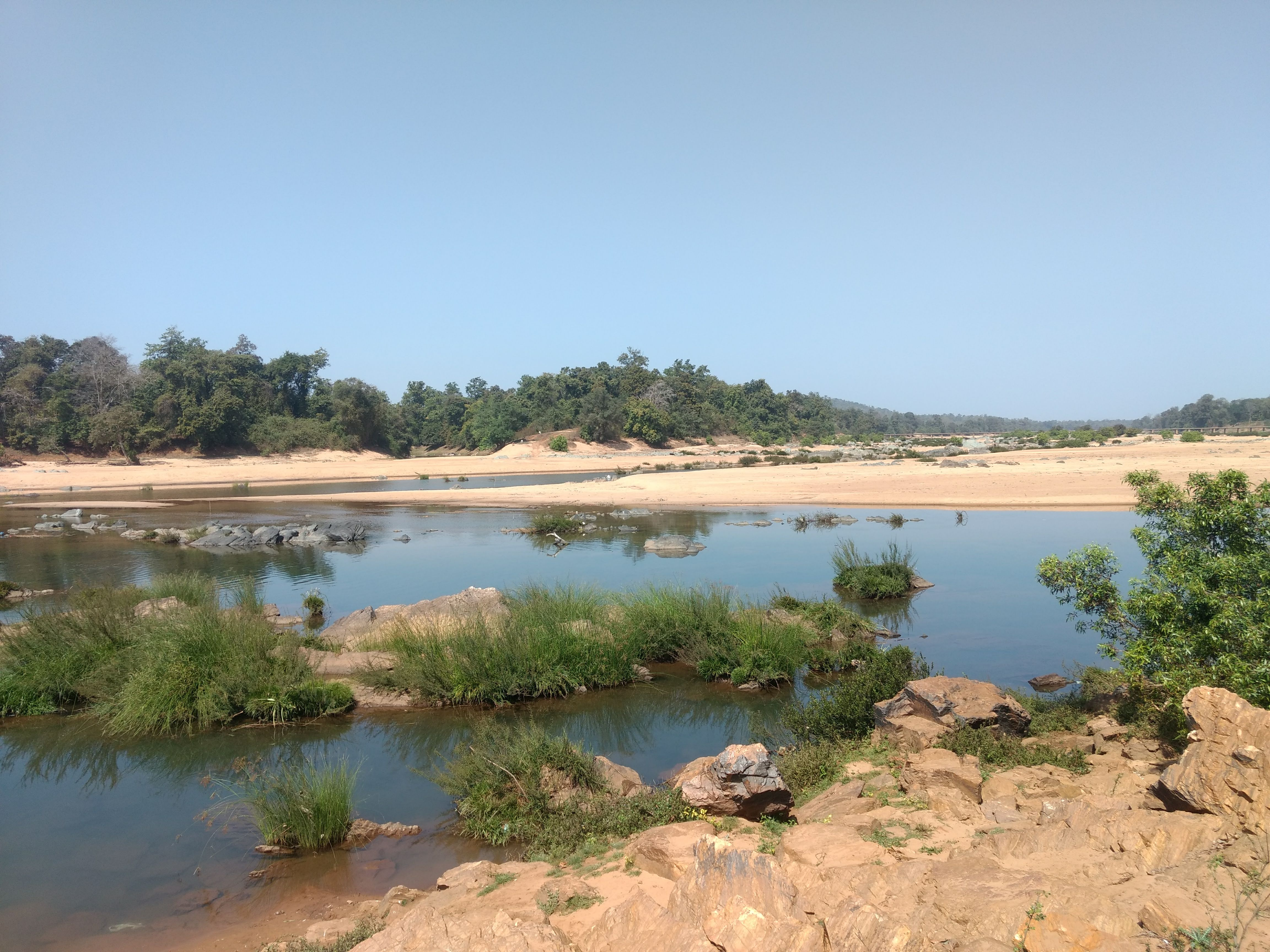
- Kotri river at Bhamragad.jpg
- Native name: कोटरी नदी (Hindi)

Location
- State: Chhattisgarh, Maharashtra
- District: Gadchiroli

Physical characteristics
- Mouth: Indravati River
  - coordinates: 19.4058°N 80.5764°E

Basin features
- River system: Godavari basin
- Bridges: Bridge near Bhamragad

Kotri river (also known as Paralkot river) is a tributary of Indravati River that flows through Chhattisgarh and Gadchiroli district of Maharashtra.

The river rises in the western hills of Bastar and flows south till it meets Indravati near Bhamragad.
