= Nityananda Gond =

Indian politician

Minister of School & Mass Education Government of Odisha
- Incumbent
- Assumed office 12 June 2024
- Chief Minister: Mohan Charan Majhi
- Preceded by: Sudam Marndi

Minister of ST & SC Development, Minorities & Backward Classes Welfare Government of Odisha
- Incumbent
- Assumed office 12 June 2024
- Chief Minister: Mohan Charan Majhi
- Preceded by: Jagannath Saraka

Member of Odisha Legislative Assembly
- Incumbent
- Assumed office 2019
- Preceded by: Subash Gond
- Constituency: Umerkote (ST)

Personal details
- Born: 1 June 1978 (age 47)
- Political party: Bharatiya Janata Party
- Spouse: Chaiti Gond
- Children: 1 son & 1 daughter
- Parent: Samaru Gond (father)
- Education: Master of Arts; Bachelor of Laws
- Profession: Advocate, Politician

Nityananda Gond is an Indian politician and Minister of School and Mass Education, ST & SC Development, Minorities & Backward Classes Welfare Government of Odisha. He is a Member of Odisha Legislative Assembly from Umerkote assembly constituency of Nabarangpur district.

He did his M.A. in history from Berhampur University in 2000, and LLB from Jeyopre Law College in 2003.

On 12 June 2024, he took oath along with Chief Minister Mohan Charan Majhi took oath in Janata Maidan, Bhubaneswar. Governor Raghubar Das administered their oath. Prime Minister Narendra Modi, Home Minister Amit Shah, Defense Minister Rajnath Singh, along with Chief Ministers of 10 BJP-ruled states were present.
