= Bhujabal Majhi =

Indian politician (born 1966)

Member of Odisha Legislative Assembly
- In office 2009–2019
- Preceded by: Ramesh Chandra Majhi
- Succeeded by: Monohara Randhari
- Constituency: Dabugam

Member of Odisha Legislative Assembly
- In office 2000–2004
- Preceded by: Jadav Majhi
- Succeeded by: Ramesh Chandra Majhi
- Constituency: Dabugam

Personal details
- Party: Indian National Congress

Bhujabal Majhi (born 20 August 1966) is an Indian National Congress politician from Odisha. He has been a member of the Odisha Legislative Assembly from 2000 to 2004 and from 2009 to 2019, elected three times from Dabugam in the 2000, 2009 and 2014 elections. He has been fielded as the Congress candidate from Nabarangpur (ST) in the 2024 general election.
