= Dabugam Assembly constituency =

Constituency of the Odisha legislative assembly in India

Coordinates: 19.46°N 82.403°E

Dabugam
- Constituency No. 76 for the Odisha Legislative Assembly

Constituency details
- Country: India
- Region: East India
- State: Odisha
- Division: Southern Division
- District: Nabarangpur
- Lok Sabha constituency: Nabarangpur
- Established: 1961
- Total electors: 2,04,966 (Note: as on 2024) (Note: as data published by election commission)
- Reservation: ST

Member of Legislative Assembly
- 17th Odisha Legislative Assembly
- Incumbent Manohar Randhari
- Party: Biju Janata Dal
- Elected year: 2024

Dabugam is a Vidhan Sabha constituency of Nabarangpur district, Odisha. After 2008 Delimitation, Kodinga Assembly constituency was subsumed into this constituency.

This constituency includes Dabugam block, Papadahandi block and 14 Gram panchayats (Atigam, Badagumuda, Balenga, Bankuli, M. Karagam, Butimajhisemla, Ekori, Kodinga, Kosagumuda, Majhidhanua, Motigam, Santoshpur, Taragam and Temara) of Kosagumuda block.

== Elected members ==
Vote share of winning candidates
2024	44.95%
2019	44.43%
2014	41.72%
2009	37.30%
2004	46.91%
2000	52.02%
1995	45.38%
1990	72.29%
1985	52.13%
1980	43.52%
1977	47.75%

Since its formation in 1961, 15 elections were held till date.

List of members elected from Dabugam constituency are:

Year	Member	Party
2024	Manohar Randhari	Biju Janata Dal
2019	Manohar Randhari	Biju Janata Dal
2014	Bhujabal Majhi	Indian National Congress
2009	Bhujabal Majhi	Indian National Congress
2004	Ramesh Chandra Majhi	Biju Janata Dal
2000	Bhujabal Majhi	Indian National Congress
1995	Jadav Majhi	Janata Dal
1990	Jadav Majhi	Janata Dal
1985	Damburu Majhi	Indian National Congress
1980	Phulamani Santa	Indian National Congress (I)
1977	Shyamghan Majhi	Janata Party
1974	Shyamghan Majhi	Utkal Congress
1971	Damburu Majhi	Swatantra Party
1967	Damburu Majhi	Swatantra Party
1961	Jagannath Tripathy	Indian National Congress

== Election results ==
=== 2024 ===
Voting were held on 13 May 2024 in 1st phase of Odisha Assembly Election & 4th phase of Indian General Election. Counting of votes was on 4 June 2024. In 2024 election, Biju Janata Dal candidate Manohar Randhari defeated Indian National Congress candidate Lipika Majhi by a margin of 21,455 votes.

2024 Vidhan Sabha Election, Dabugam
Party	Candidate	Votes	%	±%
BJD	Manohar Randhari	77,511	44.95	▲0.52
INC	Lipika Majhi	56,056	32.51	▼7.46
BJP	Somnath Pujari	34,318	19.90	▲9.96
NOTA	None of the above	4,543	2.63	▲0.33
Majority		21,455	12.44	▲7.98
Turnout		1,72,428	84.13	
BJD hold				

=== 2019 ===
In 2019 election, Biju Janata Dal candidate Manohar Randhari defeated Indian National Congress candidate Bhujabal Majhi by a margin of 7,363 votes.

2019 Vidhan Sabha Election, Dabugam
Party	Candidate	Votes	%	±%
BJD	Manohar Randhari	73,264	44.43	
INC	Bhujabal Majhi	65,901	39.97	
BJP	Padman Nayak	16394	9.94	
Independent	Manohar Randhari	3,407	2.07	
NOTA	None of the above	3,799	2.3	
Majority		7,363	4.46	
Turnout		1,64,885	83	
BJD gain from INC				

=== 2014 ===
In 2014 election, Indian National Congress candidate Bhujabal Majhi defeated Biju Janata Dal candidate Motiram Nayak by a margin of 6,097 votes.

2014 Odisha Legislative Assembly election: Dabugam
Party	Candidate	Votes	%	±%
INC	Bhujabal Majhi	62,957	41.72	▲4.42
BJD	Motiram Nayak	56,860	37.68	▲6.53
BJP	Sasi Dhar Majhi	10,853	7.19	▼11.61
NOTA	None of the above	4,696	3.11	−
Majority		6,097	4.04	▼2.11
Turnout		1,50,912	85.42	▲13.11
Registered electors		1,76,666		
INC hold				

=== 2009 ===
In 2009 election, Indian National Congress candidate Bhujabal Majhi defeated Biju Janata Dal candidate Motiram Nayak by a margin of 7,374 votes.

2009 Vidhan Sabha Election, Dabugam
Party	Candidate	Votes	%	±%
INC	Bhujabal Majhi	44,723	37.30	−
BJD	Motiram Nayak	37,349	31.15	−
BJP	Mohan Majhi	22,543	18.80	−
SAMO	Mangal Charan Naik	9,773	8.15	−
BSP	Bhaskar Majhi	5,519	4.60	−
Majority		7,374	6.15 (Note: %of total valid votes)	−
Turnout		1,19,909	72.31	−
INC gain from BJD		Swing	5.88 (Note: 2004 Voter turnout was 66.43%)	
