= Indravati River =

River in India

Indravati
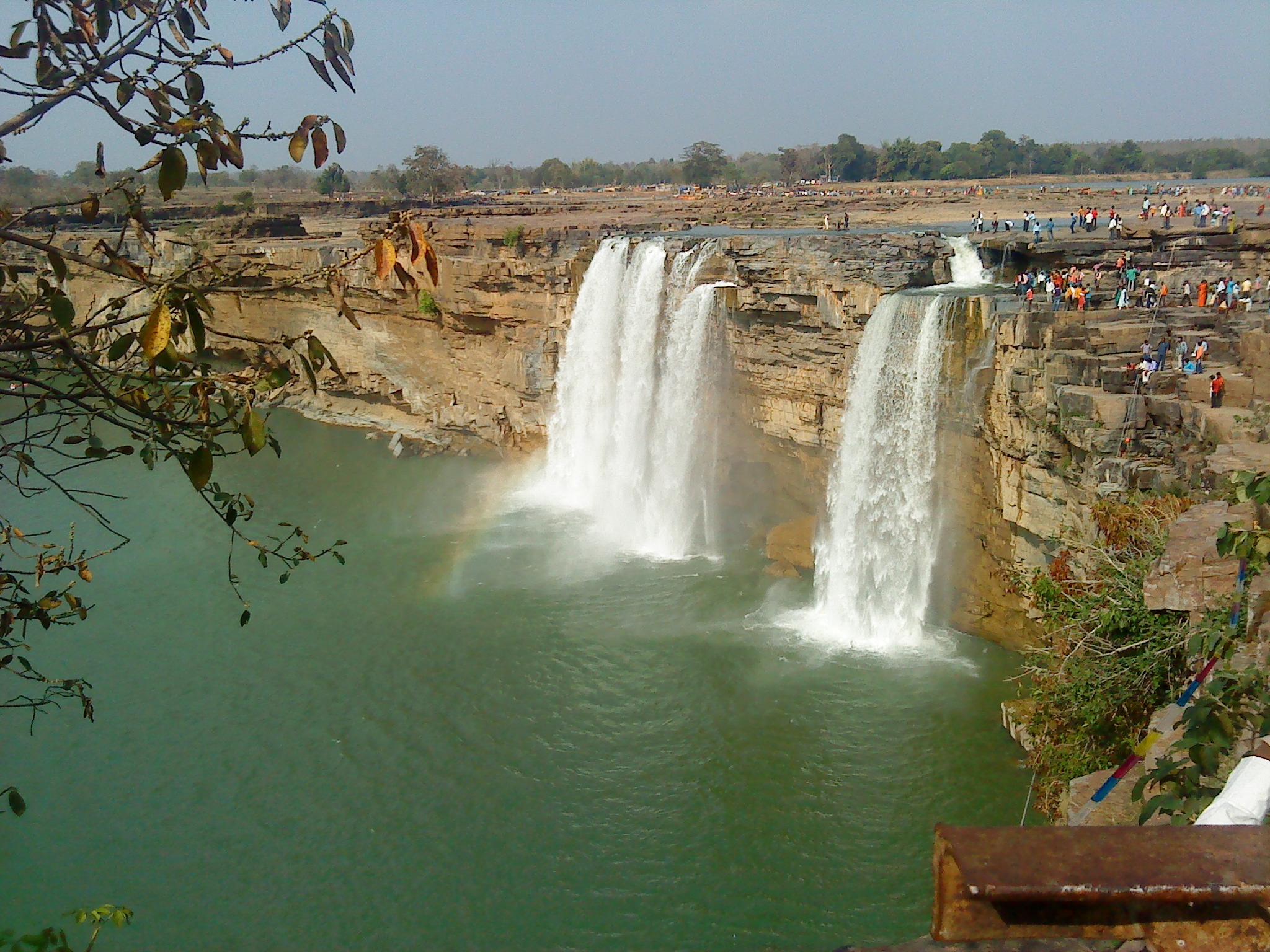
- Chitrakoot Falls on the Indravati

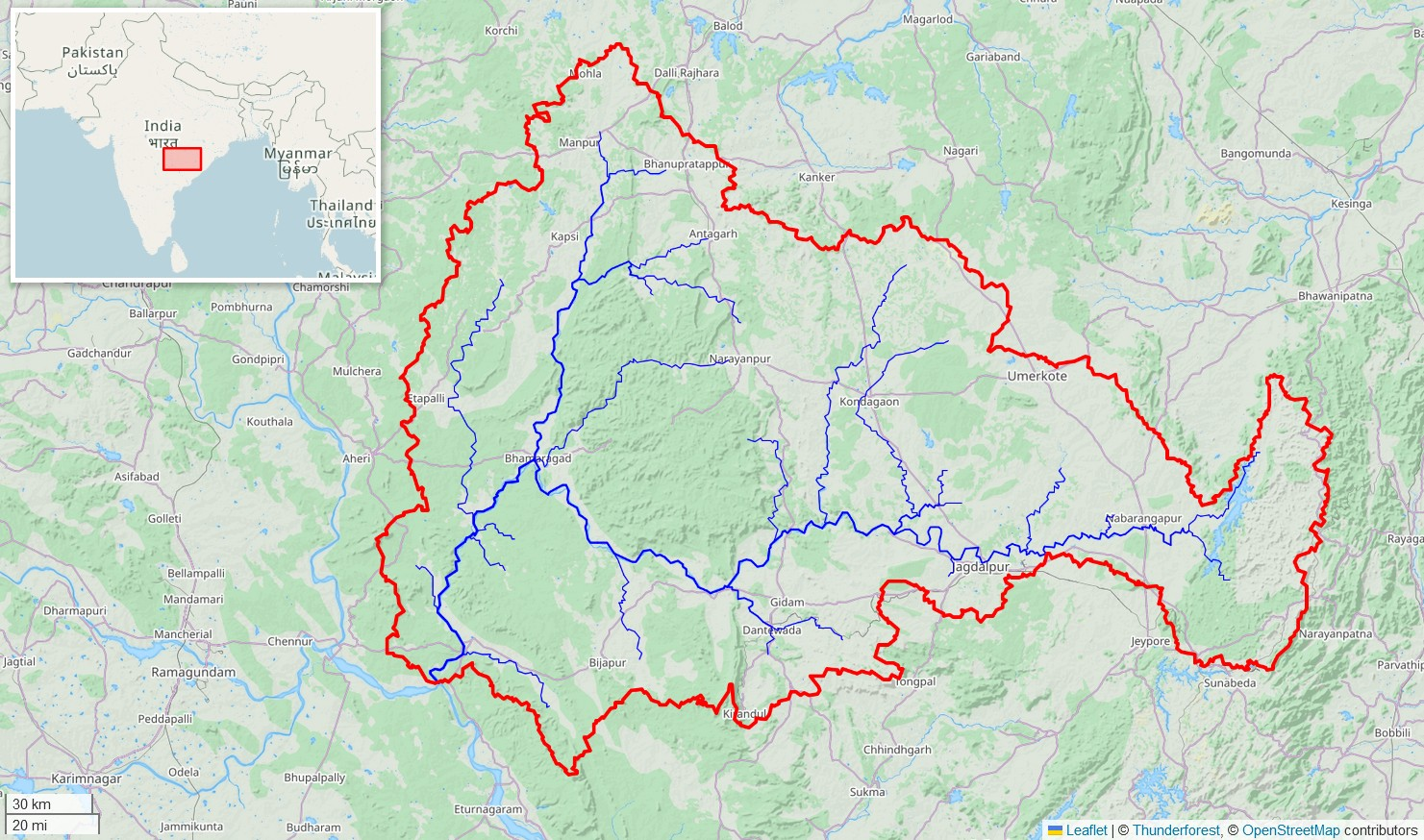
- Indravati River watershed (Interactive map)

Location
- Country: India
- State: Odisha, Chhattisgarh, Telangana, Maharashtra.

Physical characteristics
- Source
  - location: Dandakaranya Range, Kalahandi, Odisha, India
  - coordinates: 19°26′46″N 83°07′10″E
  - elevation: 914 m (2,999 ft)
- Mouth: Godavari River
  - location: Somnoor Sangam, Gadchiroli, Maharashtra, India
  - coordinates: 18°43′25″N 80°16′19″E
  - elevation: 82.3 m (270 ft)
- Length: 535 km (332 mi)
- Basin size: 40,625 km^{2} (15,685 sq mi)

Basin features
- Tributaries
  - left: Nandiraj River
  - right: Bhaskel River, Narangi River, Nimbra River, Kotri River, Bandia River

Indravati River is a tributary of the Godavari River in India. Its source is in the Dandakaranya Range, at the hilltop village of Mardiguda, Thuamula Rampur Block, Kalahandi district, Odisha. The river follows a westerly path to Jagadalpur, Chhattisgarh, then goes south, before eventually uniting with the Godavari at the borders of Chhattisgarh, Maharashtra, and Telangana states. The river flows for 535 kilometres (332 mi) and has a drainage area of 41,665 square kilometres (16,087 mi^{2}).

At various stages of its course, the river forms the boundary between Chhattisgarh and Maharashtra, and much of its course is through dense forests. It is sometimes known as the "lifeline" of the Kalahandi, Nabarangapur, and Bastar districts.

The Indravati River is the site of the Indravati Dam, the largest in eastern India. A further five hydroelectric projects were planned, but these were cancelled due to ecological reasons.

== Mythology ==
There is a Hindu mythological story behind the formation of Indravati River. Once upon a time, the place was full of Champa and Chandan trees, which fragranced the whole forest.

Due to being such a beautiful place on earth, Lord Indra and Indrani went down from Heaven to stay here for a while. They deeply enjoyed the beauty of nature; while wandering in the jungle Indra went to a small village, Sunabeda, where he met with a beautiful girl called Udanti. At first sight, they fell in love with each other, and Indra didn't want to return.

Back in the jungle, due to loneliness, Indrani cried sorrowfully and expressed her pain to the people, who gathered around. The people knew well about the affair of Indra and Udanti; they informed Indrani and suggested she stay there. Indrani became enraged over Indra and poured scorn on him and Udanti so that they would never meet again, creating the Indravati River which still flows in present day. The Indra and Udanti rivers also flow there separately, without meeting each other due to Indrani's offense.

== Source and flow ==
The river Indravati rises at an elevation of 914 metres (2,999 ft) in the Kalahandi district of Odisha on the western slopes of the Eastern Ghats. It flows west-ward through the Kalahandi, Nabarangapur and Koraput districts for 164 kilometres (102 mi) and after forming the boundary between Odisha and Chhattisgarh states for 9.5 kilometres (5.9 mi), enters the Bastar district of Chhattisgarh. After flowing 233 kilometres (145 mi) in Chhattisgarh, it turns south and flows along the boundary of Chhattisgarh and Maharashtra for about 129 kilometres (80 mi) and joins Godavari River at the junction of the boundaries of Maharashtra, Chhattisgarh and Telangana states.

The Indravati sub-basin covers a total area of about 40,625 square kilometres (15,685 mi^{2}). Indravati has a catchment area of 7,435 square kilometres (2,871 mi^{2}) in Odisha. The length of river is about 535.80 kilometres (332.93 mi), and starting from the hills of Kalahandi, it joins the Godavari river near village Bhadrakali in Bijapur district of Chhattisgarh. It has a well-defined course from its origin to its confluence with the Godavari River. Starting in a south-east direction as a small rivulet in Odisha, it later runs in the western direction through Bastar district of Chhattisgarh until it is deflected and runs north-west and then again takes a turn to the south-west. During its total course of 535.80 kilometres (332.93 mi) the river drops by 832.10 metres (2,730.0 ft). Its bed level at its junction with the Godavari River is of the order of R.L. 82.3 m compared to the level of 914.4m in Kalahandi from where it takes off.

Indravati and Sabari are interconnected naturally in Odisha area. Indravati waters overflow into the Sabari through Jaura Nallah during floods..

== Tributaries ==
The major tributaries of river Indravati are Keshadhara Nalla, Kandabindha Nallah, Chandragiri Nalla, Golagar Nalla, Poragarh Nalla, Kapur Nallah, Muran River, Bangiri Nallah, Telengi Nallah, Parlijori Nallah, Turi Nallah, Chourijori Nallah, Damayanti Sayarh, Kora river, Modang river, Padrikundijori river, Jaura river and Bhaskel river.

The important right bank tributaries of the Indravati are Bhaskel, Boarding, Narangi, Nimbra (Parlkota), Kotri and Bandia. The important left bank tributary is Nandiraj.

== Hydroelectric projects ==
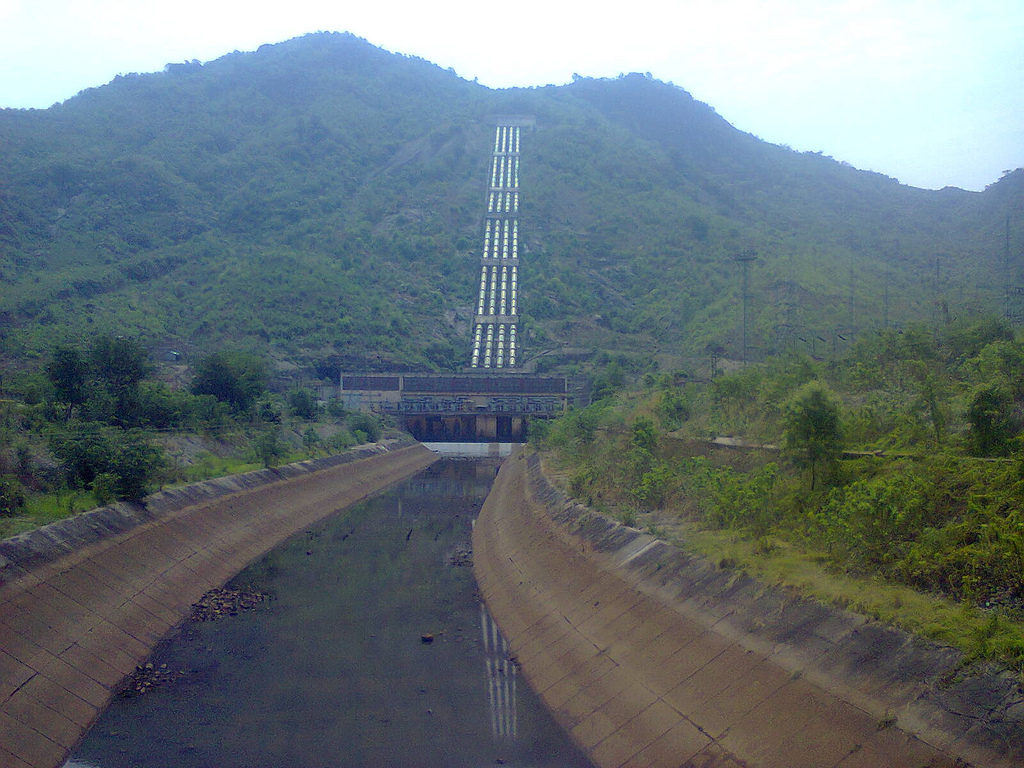
Indiravati Dam

The Indravati Dam or Upper Indravati Hydro Power Project built near Mukhiguda, Kalahandi is one of the largest dams in India as well as Asia. It is the largest dam in eastern India, and it produces 600 MW of electricity. The Upper Indravati Project envisages diversion of the water of the Indravati River in its upper reaches into the Mahanadi Valley for power generation and irrigation.

A total of five hydroelectric projects (Kutru I, Kutru II, Nugur I, Nugur II and Bhopalpatnam) were planned on the stretch of Indravati River at various points in time. But none could see the light of the day due to ecological concerns raised in various fora.

According to Interstate Agreement as per Godavari Water Disputes Tribunal (GWDT) Report, the State of Odisha has to ensure 1.3×10^{9} cubic metres (45,000×10^{6} cu ft) (45 TMC) of water at the Odisha–Chhattisgarh border.

== Ecology ==
The Chitrakoot Falls are located 40 kilometres (25 mi) from Jagdalpur, in Chhattisgarh. It is almost extinguished because of indiscriminate construction of check dams near the fall. Social Activists and environmentalists have campaigned to protect it.

Indravati National Park and Tiger Reserves are also located in the adjoining region of Chhattisgarh state.

== See also ==
- List of rivers of India
- Rivers of India
- Icchampally Project
- Eastern States Union
