= Umerkote Assembly constituency =

Constituency of the Odisha legislative assembly in India

Coordinates: 19.66°N 82.21°E

Umerkote
- Constituency No. 73 for the Odisha Legislative Assembly

Constituency details
- Country: India
- Region: East India
- State: Odisha
- Division: Southern Division
- District: Nabarangpur
- Lok Sabha constituency: Nabarangpur
- Established: 1957
- Total electors: 1,96,646 (Note: as on 2024) (Note: as data published by election commission)
- Reservation: ST

Member of Legislative Assembly
- 17th Odisha Legislative Assembly
- Incumbent Nityananda Gond
- Party: Bharatiya Janata Party
- Elected year: 2024

Umerkote is a Vidhan Sabha constituency of Nabarangpur district, Odisha.

This constituency includes Umerkote, Raighar block and 8 Gram panchayats (Kurushi, Beheda, Kopena, Bakoda, Murtuma, Burja, Sunabeda and Semala) of Umerkote block.

== Elected members ==
Vote share of winning candidates
2024	43.35%
2019	39.12%
2014	37.15%
2011 (bypoll)	45.13%
2009	40.60%
2004	38.29%
2000	49.75%
1995	47.42%
1990	56.24%
1985	49.94%
1980	53.22%
1977	58.61%

Since its formation in 1957, 18 elections were held till date including in two bypolls in 1959 & 2011.

List of members elected from Umerkote constituency are:

Year	Member	Party
2024	Nityananda Gond	Bharatiya Janata Party
2019	Nityananda Gond	Bharatiya Janata Party
2014	Subash Gond	Biju Janata Dal
2011 (bypoll) (Note: Death of Jagabandhu Majhi)	Subash Gond	Biju Janata Dal
2009	Jagabandhu Majhi	Biju Janata Dal
2004	Dharmu Gond	Bharatiya Janata Party
2000	Parama Pujari	Indian National Congress
1995	Parama Pujari	Indian National Congress
1990	Gurubaru Majhi	Janata Dal
1985	Parama Pujari	Indian National Congress
1980	Parama Pujari	Indian National Congress
1977	Rabi Singh Majhi	Janata Party
1974	Rabi Singh Majhi	Utkal Congress
1971	Rabi Singh Majhi	Utkal Congress
1967	Rabi Singh Majhi	Indian National Congress
1961	Sadashiva Tripathy	Indian National Congress
1959 (bypoll) (Note: Resignation of Radhakrushna Biswas Ray)	Abdur Rahiman	Ganatantra Parishad
1957	Radhakrushna Biswas Ray	Indian National Congress

== Election results ==
=== 2024 ===
Voting were held on 13th May 2024 in 1st phase of Odisha Assembly Election & 4th phase of Indian General Election. Counting of votes was on 4th June 2024. In 2024 election, Bharatiya Janata Party candidate Nityananda Gond defeated Biju Janata Dal candidate Nabina Nayak by a margin of 10,373 votes.

2024 Vidhan Sabha Election, Umerkote
Party	Candidate	Votes	%	±%
BJP	Nityananda Gond	70,170	43.35	▲4.23
BJD	Nabina Nayak	59,797	36.94	▲4.30
INC	Sanaraj Gond	25,026	15.46	▼5.67
NOTA	None of the above	4,076	2.52	▼0.21
Majority		10,373	6.41	▼0.07
Turnout		1,61,858	82.31	
BJP hold				

=== 2019 ===
In 2019 election, Bharatiya Janata Party candidate Nityananda Gond defeated Biju Janata Dal candidate Subash Gond by a margin of 9,922 votes.

2019 Vidhan Sabha Election, Umerkote
Party	Candidate	Votes	%	±%
BJP	Nityananda Gond	59,895	39.12	
BJD	Subash Gond	49,973	32.64	
INC	Jasoda Gond	32,343	21.13	
NOTA	None of the above	4,181	2.73	
Majority		9,922	6.48	
Turnout		1,53,088	78.95	
BJP gain from BJD				

=== 2014 ===
In 2014 election, Biju Janata Dal candidate Subash Gond defeated Indian National Congress candidate Jatindra Nath Gond by a margin of 10,522 votes.

2014 Vidhan Sabha Election, Umerkote
Party	Candidate	Votes	%	±%
BJD	Subash Gond	50,500	37.15	▼3.45
INC	Jatindra Nath Gond	39,978	29.41	▲6.04
BJP	Nityananda Gond	21,351	15.71	▼11.91
NOTA	None of the above	4,930	3.63	−
Majority		10,522	7.74	▼5.24
Turnout		1,35,943	78.67	8.5
Registered electors		1,72,800		
BJD hold				

=== 2011 Bypoll ===
In 2011 bye-election, Biju Janata Dal candidate Subash Gond defeated Bharatiya Janata Party candidate Dharmu Gond by a margin of 21061 votes.

2011 (bypoll), Umerkote
Party	Candidate	Votes	%	±%
BJD	Subash Gond	54,713	45.13	
BJP	Dharmu Gond	33,652	27.76	
INC	Jatindranath Gond	32,877	27.12	
Majority		21,061	17.37	
Turnout		1,21,242	73.4	
BJD hold				

=== 2009 ===
In 2009 election, Biju Janata Dal candidate Jagabandhu Majhi defeated Bharatiya Janata Party candidate Dharmu Gond by a margin of 14,171 votes.

2009 Vidhan Sabha Election, Umerkote
Party	Candidate	Votes	%	±%
BJD	Jagabandhu Majhi	44,326	40.60	−
BJP	Dharmu Gond	30,155	27.62	−
INC	Parama Pujari	25,512	23.37	−
Majority		14,171	12.98 (Note: % of total valid votes)	−
Turnout		1,09,187	70.17	−
BJD gain from BJP		Swing	3.78 (Note: 2004 Voter turnout was 66.39%)	
