= Malkangiri Assembly constituency =

Constituency of the Odisha legislative assembly in India

Coordinates: 18.35°N 81.89°E

Malkangiri
- Constituency No. 146 for the Odisha Legislative Assembly

Constituency details
- Country: India
- Region: East India
- State: Odisha
- Division: Southern Division
- District: Malkangiri
- Lok Sabha constituency: Nabarangpur
- Established: 1951
- Total electors: 2,47,087 (Note: as on 2024) (Note: as data published by election commission)
- Reservation: ST

Member of Legislative Assembly
- 17th Odisha Legislative Assembly
- Incumbent Narasinga Madkami
- Party: Bharatiya Janata Party
- Elected year: 2024

Malkangiri is a Vidhan Sabha constituency of Malkangiri district, Odisha.

Map of Malkangiri Constituency

This constituency includes Malkangiri, Malkangiri block, Kalimela block, Podia block and 7 Gram panchayats (Tandiki, Chalanguda, Matapaka, Tandapalli, Gorakhunta, Sikhapalli, Badili, Korukonda and Tumusapali) of Korukunda block.

== Elected members ==
Vote share of winning candidates
2024	41.76%
2019	41.61%
2014	32.61%
2009	39.96%
2004	45.72%
2000	46.62%
1995	39.25%
1992 (bypoll)	50.04%
1990	45.15%
1985	36.96%
1980	40.47%
1977	67.09%

Since its formation in 1951, 18 elections were held till date including one bypoll in 1992.

List of members elected Malkangiri constituency are:

Year	Member	Party
2024	Narasinga Madkami	Bharatiya Janata Party
2019	Aditya Madhi	Bharatiya Janata Party
2014	Manas Madkami	Biju Janata Dal
2009	Mukunda Sodi	Biju Janata Dal
2004	Nimai Chandra Sarkar	Indian National Congress
2000	Arabinda Dhali	Bharatiya Janata Party
1995	Arabinda Dhali	Bharatiya Janata Party
1992 (bypoll) (Note: Resignation of Naka Kannaya)	Arabinda Dhali	Bharatiya Janata Party
1990	Naka Kannaya	Janata Dal
1985	Nadiabasi Biswas	Independent
1980	Naka Laxmaya	Indian National Congress (I)
1977	Naka Kannaya	Janata Party
1974	Naka Kannaya	Utkal Congress
1971	Gangadhar Madhi	Indian National Congress (R)
1967	Gangadhar Madhi	Indian National Congress
1961	Guru Nayak	Indian National Congress
1957	Guru Nayak	Ganatantra Parishad
1952	Laxman Gauda	Ganatantra Parishad

== Election results ==
=== 2024 ===
Voting were held on 13 May 2024 in 1st phase of Odisha Assembly Election & 4th phase of Indian General Election. Counting of votes was on 4 June 2024. In 2024 election, Bharatiya Janata Party candidate Narasinga Madkami defeated Indian National Congress candidate Mala Madhi by a margin of 14,890 votes.

2024 Odisha Vidhan Sabha Election: Malkangiri
Party	Candidate	Votes	%	±%
BJP	Narasinga Madkami	78,679	41.76	▲0.15
INC	Mala Madhi	63,789	33.85	▲9.18
BJD	Manas Madkami	34,688	18.41	▼8.05
NOTA	None of the above	4,102	2.18	▲0.24
Majority		14,890	7.91	▼7.24
Turnout		1,88,423	76.26	▲3.67
BJP hold				

=== 2019 ===
In 2019 election, Bharatiya Janata Party candidate Aditya Madhi defeated Indian National Congress candidate Mala Madhi by a margin of 25,929 votes.

2019 Odisha Vidhan Sabha Election: Malkangiri
Party	Candidate	Votes	%	±%
BJP	Aditya Madhi	70,263	41.61	▲16.7
INC	Mala Madhi	44,694	26.46	▼3.89
BJD	Mukunda Sodi	41,667	24.67	▼7.94
NOTA	None of the above	3,274	1.94	
Majority		25,929	15.15	▼0.51
Turnout		1,63,739	72.59	▼2.19
BJP gain from BJD				

=== 2014 ===
In 2014 election, Biju Janata Dal candidate Manas Madkami defeated Indian National Congress candidate Mala Madhi by a margin of 3,312 votes.

2014 Odisha Vidhan Sabha Election: Malkangiri
Party	Candidate	Votes	%	±%
BJD	Manas Madkami	47,737	32.61	▲7.35
INC	Mala Madhi	44,425	30.35	▲1.62
BJP	Aditya Madhi	36,212	24.74	▲4.71
NOTA	None of the above	3,591	2.45	−
Majority		3,312	2.26	▼8.98
Turnout		1,46,383	74.78	▲24.51
Registered electors		1,95,739		
BJD hold				

=== 2009 ===
In 2009 election, Biju Janata Dal candidate Mukunda Sodi defeated Indian National Congress candidate Nabin Chandra Madkami by a margin of 10,906 votes.

2009 Odisha Vidhan Sabha Election: Malkangiri
Party	Candidate	Votes	%	±%
BJD	Mukunda Sodi	38,788	39.96	−
INC	Nabin Chandra Madkami	27,882	28.73	−
BJP	Aditya Madhi	19,445	20.03	−
Majority		10,906	11.24 (Note: % of total valid votes)	−
Turnout		97073	50.27 (Note: 2004 Voter turnout was 66.80%)	▼16.53
BJD gain from INC				
