= Ponnada Subba Rao =

Indian politician and lawyer

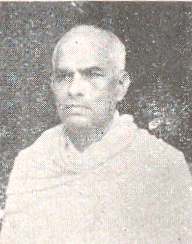
Ponnada Subba Rao in 1952

Ponnada Subba Rao was an Indian politician and lawyer. He represented the Nowrangpur constituency in the 1st Lok Sabha (lower house of the parliament of India) elected in 1952.

== Early life and youth ==
He was born in Yellamacnchili, Vizagapatam District, on 7 November 1889, son of Ponnada Ramayya. He studied at London Mission High School in Vizagapatam, Rajah's College in Parlakimedi, Pachaiyappas College in Madras, Maharajah's College in Vizianagaram and at the Madras Law College. Ponnada Subba Rao obtained Bachelor of Arts and Bachelor of Law degrees. In 1908 he married Seshama, the couple had eight children (five sons and three daughters). Ponnada Subba Rao tough at C.B. Mission High School in Vizagapatam between July 1913 and July 1915. He authored a book on history of Rome in Telugu language, published in 1914.

== Struggle for Independence ==
Ponnada Subba Rao became a member of the Indian National Congress in 1920. During 1921-1922 he suspended his law practice and joined the Non-Cooperation Movement. During this period he served as Secretary of the Vizagapatam District Congress Committee.

== Parliamentarian ==
Rao renounced his membership in the Indian National Congress in March 1951. In 1952, Rao was elected to the first Lok Sabha from the Nowrangpur constituency as a candidate of the All India Ganatantra Parishad. He obtained 67,257 votes (46.96%). Rao was one of six AIGP members from Orissa in the first Lok Sabha.

According to the official Lok Sabha biography, Rao's past-time interests included Hindu and Christian literature studies, issues relating to railways and statistics.
