= Gouri Shankar Majhi =

Indian politician

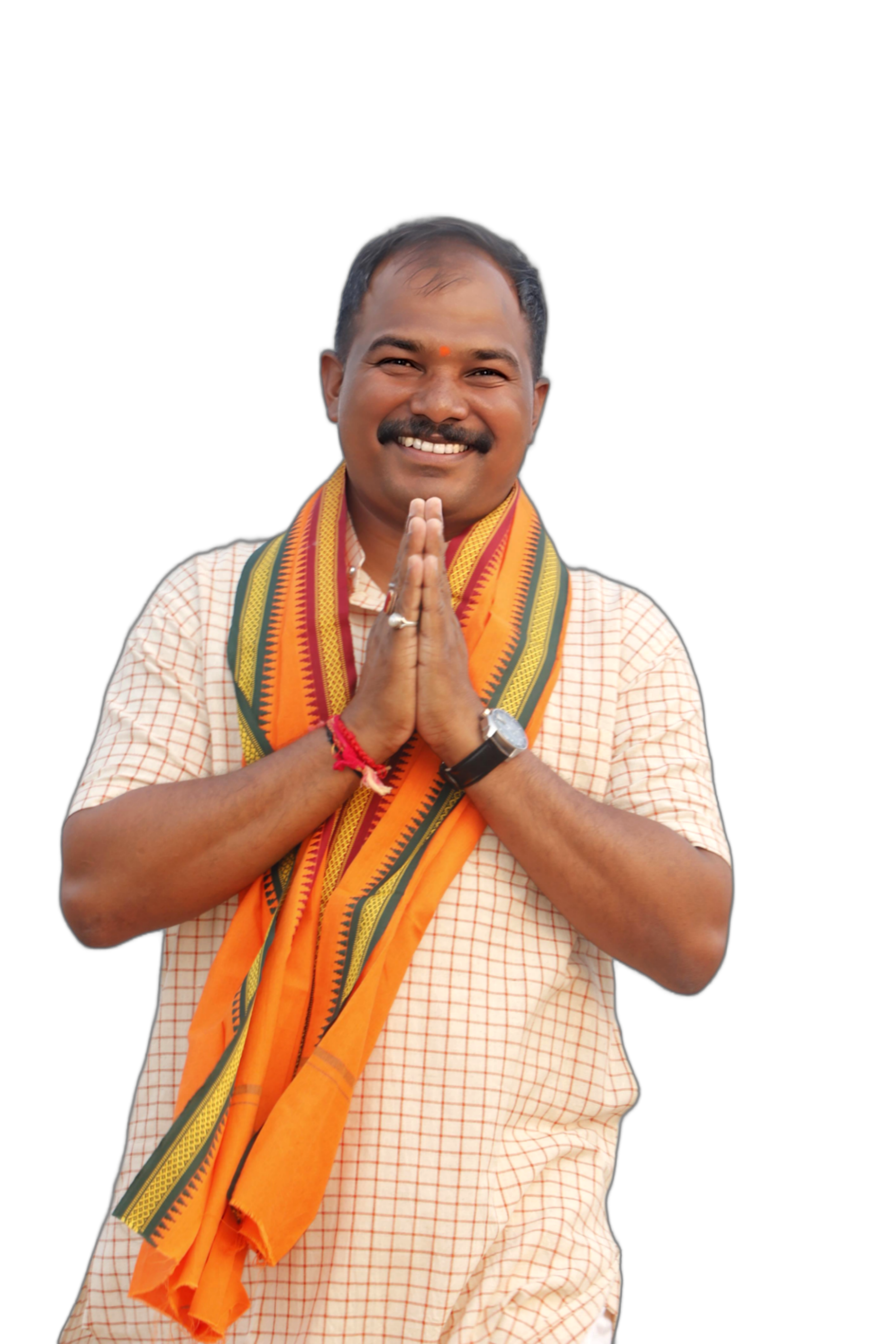

Member of Odisha Legislative Assembly
- Incumbent
- Assumed office 4 June 2024
- Preceded by: Sadasiva Pradhani
- Constituency: Nabarangpur

Personal details
- Party: Bharatiya Janata Party
- Profession: Politician

Gouri Shankar Majhi is an Indian politician. He was elected to the Odisha Legislative Assembly from Nabarangpur as a member of the Bharatiya Janata Party.
