= Parsuram Majhi =

Indian politician

Member: 13th and 14th Lok Sabha
- Constituency: Nowrangpur

Personal details
- Born: 1 December 1961 (age 64) Nowrangpur, Odisha
- Party: BJP
- Spouse: Kusum Majhi
- Children: 1 son and 2 daughters
- As of 22 September, 2006

Parsuram Majhi (born 1 December 1961) was a member of the 13th Lok Sabha and 14th Lok Sabha of India. He represented the Nowrangpur constituency of Odisha and is a member of the Bharatiya Janata Party (BJP) political party.
