= Narsing Bhatra =

Indian politician

Member of the Odisha Legislative Assembly
- Incumbent
- Assumed office 4 June 2024
- Preceded by: Prakash Chandra Majhi
- Constituency: Jharigam

Personal details
- Party: Bharatiya Janata Party
- Profession: Politician

Narsing Bhatra is an Indian politician. He was elected to the Odisha Legislative Assembly from Jharigam as a member of the Bharatiya Janata Party in 2024.
