= Manohar Randhari =

Indian politician

Member of Odisha Legislative Assembly
- Incumbent
- Assumed office 4 June 2024
- Preceded by: Manohar Randhari
- Constituency: Dabugam

Personal details
- Party: Biju Janata Dal
- Profession: Politician

Manohar Randhari is an Indian politician who was elected to the Odisha Legislative Assembly from Dabugam as a member of the Biju Janata Dal.
