= Chandahandi =

Chandahandi Panabeda
- Town
- Location in Odisha, India Chandahandi (India)
- Coordinates: 19.8449215°N 82.4912886°E
- Country: India
- State: Odisha
- District: Nabarangpur

Population (2001)
  - Total: 61,076

Languages
  - Official: Odia
- Time zone: UTC+5:30 (IST)
- PIN: 764077
- Telephone code: 06867
- Vehicle registration: OD 24
- Sex ratio: 49.7:50.3 ♂/♀
- Website: odisha.gov.in

Chandahandi is a town and Administrative Block in Nabarangpur District in Odisha State in India.

== Demographics ==
As of 2001 a total population of 61076, which consists of 30350 male and 30726 female. Total SC (Scheduled Caste) and ST (Scheduled Tribe) population was 6,479 and 20,276 respectively. According to census 2011 information the sub-district code of Chandahandi Block (CD) is 03190. Total area of chandahandi tehsil is 265 km^{2}.According to Census 2011, the block had a total of 73,953, which constitutes 36,460 males and 37,493 females across 89 census villages.

== History ==
Chandahandi Block started functioning on April 1, 1961, with its headquarters at Chandahandi. It entered Stage-II on April 1, 1974. The block falls under the Tribal Sub-Plan area of Nabarangpur ITDA and the jurisdiction of DRDA, Nabarangpur.

== Geography ==
Chandahandi is only 500 ft above the sea level

The Tel River, which emerges from the dense forest of Beheda village in the Umerkote region, flows through Laxidora and Telnadi villages before entering Chandahandi. It continues into the Kalahandi district at Gambhariguda village and eventually merges into the Mahanadi River.

Governance:

The Panchayat Samiti of Chandahandi comprises 14 Gram Panchayats (GPs) and includes 88 revenue villages covering an area of 600 square kilometers.

== Education and health ==
1. Panabeda Degree College, Chandahandi
2. Panabeda Higher Secondary School Chandahandi
3. Govt (SSD) Higher Secondary School Chandahandi
4. Govt Panabeda High School Chandahandi
5. Jadav Majhi Girls High School Mohra
6. Khambeswari High School Khairabhadi
7. Govt (SSD) Girls High School Dalabeda
8. ITI Phatki
9. OAV Phatki

Healthcare centre

1. CHC Chandahandi
2. PHC Anakabeda
3. PHC Beheramunda
4. PHC Dalabeda
5. PHC Deobandha

Many Sub-Health Centres are situated throughout the Chandahandi Block

== Art & culture ==
As this place is happened to be a town of Nabarangpur District has an old tradition of Art and Culture, People of the tehsil perform folk dance like Geet Kudia, Ghumura, Banabadi, Madhia, Samparda, Sankirtann etc. Rath Jatra, Dusshera (Dasahara), Holi and Mahasivaratri all these Hindu festivals are celebrated together by the town people.

== Festivals ==
- Mondei (Derived from Hindi word "Mondi" means "small market") is a local festival and is a huge celebration in this town and Nabarangpur District. Most people of the town as well as the district celebrates the festival by worshipping a common presiding deity. Generally this festival is celebrated after harvesting of crops. During the festival many entertainment programmes like plays, opera, melody and folk dances are performed whole night. To watch this large no. of men and women comes from all corner of the Nabarangpur district.

Holi, Dussehra, Ratha Yatra, Nua khai, Bol Bum, Kalasi etc. are among festivals that are celebrated in the Chandahandi Tehsil.
