= Nabarangpur district =

Nabarangpur district Nowrangpur district
- District of Odisha
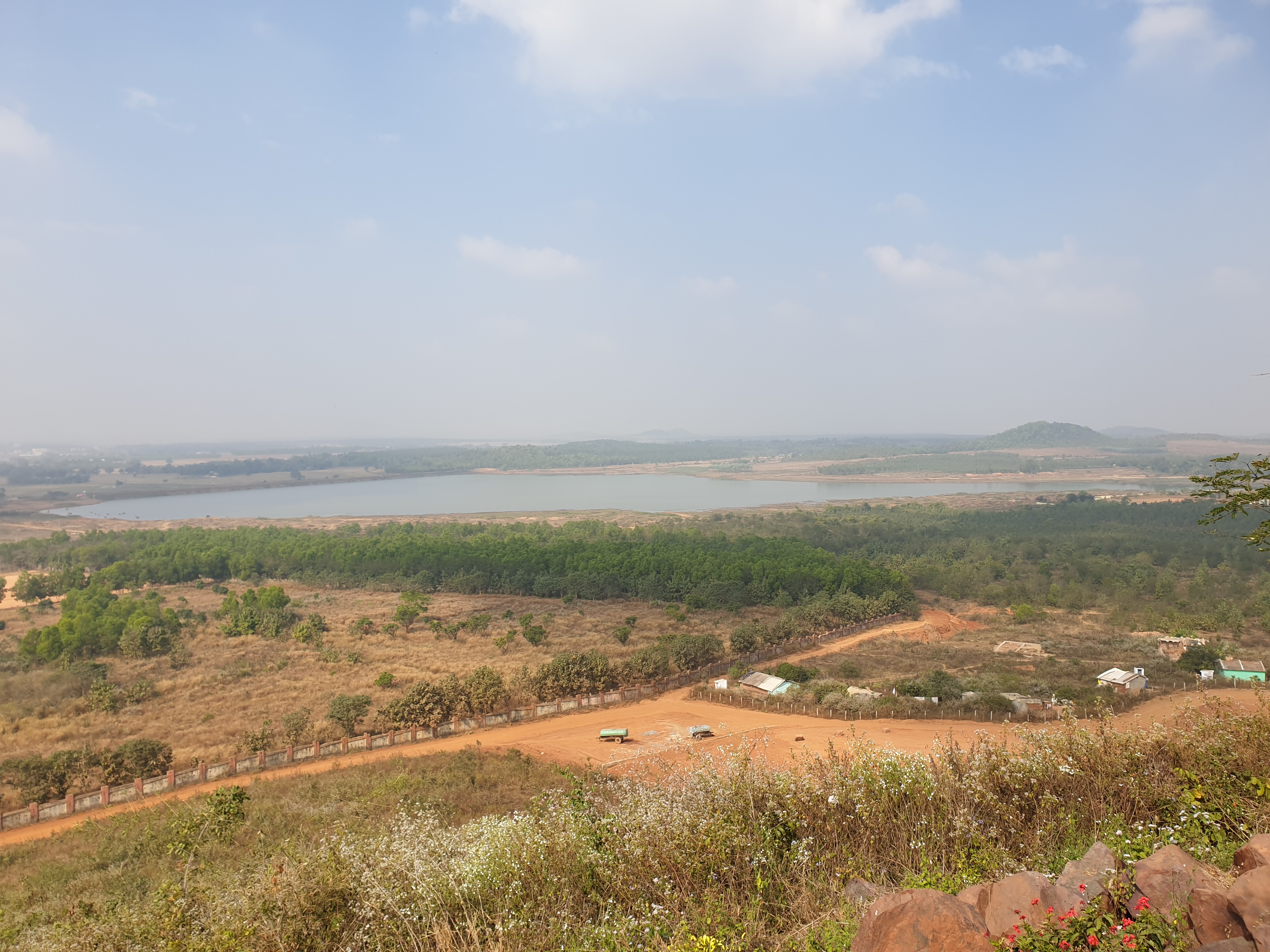
- View of Nabarangpur Lake

- Location in Odisha
- Coordinates: 19.23°N 82.55°E
- Country: India
- State: Odisha
- Headquarters: Nabarangpur

Government
  - Collector & District Magistrate: Subhankar Mohapatra, IAS
  - Divisional Forest Officer Cum Wildlife Warden: K.R Parida, [OFS-1]
  - Superintendent of Police: S. Sushree, IPS

Area
  - Total: 5,294 km^{2} (2,044 sq mi)
- Elevation: 195 m (640 ft)

Population (2011)
  - Total: 1,220,946
  - Density: 192/km^{2} (500/sq mi)

Languages
  - Official: Odia
  - Local: Bhatri, Gondi, Kui
- Time zone: UTC+5:30 (IST)
- PIN: 764 059
- Vehicle registration: OD-24
- Sex ratio: 1.007 ♂/♀
- Lok Sabha constituency: Nabarangpur(ST)
- Vidhan Sabha constituency: 4: 073-Umerkote(ST) 074-Jharigam(ST) 075-Nabarangpur(ST) 076-Dabugam(ST)
- Climate: Aw (Köppen)
- Precipitation: 1,691 millimetres (66.6 in)
- Avg. summer temperature: 40 °C (104 °F)
- Avg. winter temperature: 12 °C (54 °F)
- Website: www.nabarangpur.nic.in

Nabarangpur district, also known as Nabarangapur district or Nowrangpur district, is a district of Odisha, India. The city of Nabarangpur is the district capital. Most of its population is tribal and the land is heavily forested. It borders Kalahandi and Koraput districts. Nabarangpur district is situated at 19.14′ latitude and 82.32′ longitude at an average elevation of 572 metres (1,877 ft).

== Geography ==
The district is a relatively flat forested plateau with thick forest cover in the north and east of the district, while in the west there are some low hills which rise up to 1000 metres. In the south are the plains of the Indravati River, which forms much of the border with Koraput district, while the easternmost boundary close to Rayagada is in the Eastern Ghats. In the northeast is a tract named Panabeda Mutta around Chandahandi, around 150 metres above sea level.

== History ==
Early history for the region is scanty. The Mauryas were believed to have exercised some control over the region, which was under the control of Kalinga. Kharavela, who led a Kalinga resurgence, mentioned the territory as Vidyadhara and used troops for the region in his conquests. The second and third centuries saw Nabarangpur ruled by the Satavahanas, Ikshavakus and Vakatakas in succession. However by 350 CE the district was not under the control of any major power, when Samudragupta led an expedition to the region. However Nabarangpur never came under direct control of the Guptas. In the 4th or 5th century CE the Nala dynasty, with their headquarters in Pushkari near Umerkote, took control of the entire Bastar-Koraput region. The ruins of large temples and land grants indicate extensive civilizational development in the area. The Nalas fought several wars with the Vakatakas, the first of which they won handily and the second of which Pushkari was destroyed. Nala power was briefly restored by Skanda Varman, who rebuilt Pushkari, but was soon swept away by the Chalukyas. At the end of the 5th century CE, the Eastern Gangas came to control the area, but this period is little-known.

By the middle of the 9th century CE, the territory, known as Trikalinga, was now under the Somvanshi rulers of South Kosala. In 1023, Rajendra Chola conquered the entire Bastar-Koraput region, then known as Chakrakota, but was soon beaten back by the Gangas.

At this time the Chindaka Naga dynasty, attested to in the Errakote inscription, established its rule in the region starting in 945. The Telugu Chodas, who accompanied Vikramaditya VI's expedition to the region, became feudatories to them. Although the dynasty lost strength starting in 1050, descendants of the family continued to rule until the 13th century. They were replaced by the Matsyas, who may have exercised some control over Nabarangpur. In the 14th century, the Silavamshis conquered the region and patronized Jainism and Shaktism. They were later made tributary to the Golconda Sultanate.

The modern district of Nabarangpur was under the territory of the Suryavanshi kings of Jeypore, who were previously feudatories of the Gajapatis starting in the 15 century CE until the dissolution of the princely state in 1951. When the Gajapatis collapsed in 1541 following the death of Prataparudra Deva, Vishwanath Dev, ruler of Nandapur and a former feudal lord of Pratap Rudra conquered a large territory that touched Bengal in the north to river Godavari in the south and stretched up to Visakhapatanam in the east till the kingdom of Bastar in the west.

Later, Vikram Dev I (1758-1781 CE) of Jeypore appointed his second son Jagganath Dev as the zamindar of Nowrangpur. The district was thus administered as a part of Koraput. Eventually Nabarangpur subdivision was created in 1941.

Nabarangpur played a part in the freedom movement. Several people from Nabarangpur were the founders of Congress chapter in Koraput. They participated in the civil disobedience movement launched by Gandhi starting in 1942. On 24 August 1942, a crowd of people assembled in Dabugaon to launch a procession to decide the next stage of the freedom movement. At the flooded Turi River near Papadahandi, the police lathi-charged and fired on the demonstrators, killing 19, injuring 100 and arresting 140.

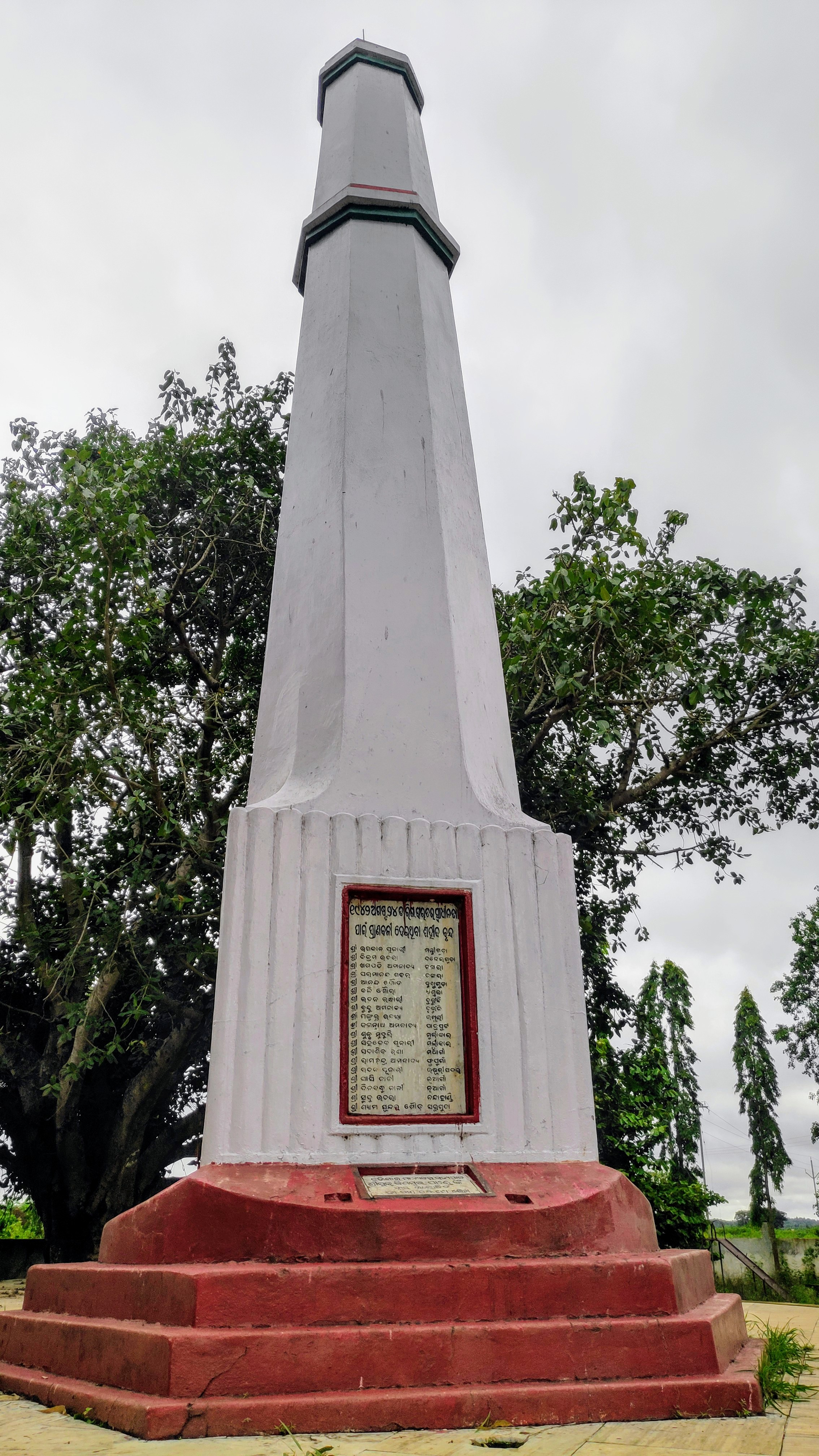
Sahid Minar, Papadahandi

After Independence, the Odisha assembly abolished all zamindaris and estates. As part of this, the undivided Koraput district, which was known as the Jeypore Zamindari, was divided into 10 anchals, 3 of which were Nabarangpur, Borigumma and Umerkote. In 1958, some refugees from East Pakistan were settled in Umerkote subdivision as part of the Dandakaranya Project. In 1991, Nabarangpur district was carved out of Koraput district.

== Economy ==
In 2006, the Ministry of Panchayati Raj named Nabarangpur one of the country's 250 poorest districts (out of a total of 640). It is one of the 19 districts in Odisha currently receiving funds from the Backward Regions Grant Fund Programme (BRGF). The majority of the district's population is dependent on agriculture, with 40% of the land under cultivation. In recent years some industry has been set up in the district.

== Demographics ==
Historical population
| Year | Pop. | ±% |
|---|---|---|
| 1901 | 180,597 | — |
| 1911 | 217,118 | +20.2% |
| 1921 | 210,348 | −3.1% |
| 1931 | 248,072 | +17.9% |
| 1941 | 294,084 | +18.5% |
| 1951 | 330,476 | +12.4% |
| 1961 | 422,325 | +27.8% |
| 1971 | 547,944 | +29.7% |
| 1981 | 681,579 | +24.4% |
| 1991 | 846,659 | +24.2% |
| 2001 | 1,025,766 | +21.2% |
| 2011 | 1,220,946 | +19.0% |
Source: Census of India

Religions in Nabarangpur district (2011)
| Religion | Percent |
| Hinduism | 96.48% |
| Christianity | 2.63% |
| Islam | 0.55% |
| Other or not stated | 0.34% |

According to the 2011 Census of India Nabarangpur district has a population of 1,220,946, ranking it the 390th in population (out of a total of 640). The district has a population density of 230 inhabitants per square kilometre (600/sq mi). Its population growth rate over the 2001-2011 decade was 18.81%. Nabarangapur has a sex ratio of 1018 females for every 1000 males and a literacy rate of 48.2%. 7.18% of the population lives in urban areas. Scheduled Castes and Scheduled Tribes are 14.53% and 55.79% of the population respectively.

Languages of Nabarangpur district (2011)
1. Odia (68.6%)
2. Bhatri (7.12%)
3. Gondi (4.50%)
4. Bengali (4.41%)
5. Chhattisgarhi (4.28%)
6. Desia (2.49%)
7. Halbi (1.90%)
8. Kui (1.57%)
9. Kuvi (1.40%)
10. Other (3.69%)

At the time of the 2011 census, 68.64% of the population in the district spoke Odia, 7.12% Bhatri, 4.50% Gondi, 4.41% Bengali, 4.28% Chhattisgarhi, 2.49% Desia, 1.90% Halbi, 1.57% Kui and 1.40% Kuvi as their first language. Major Odia dialects of the region include Desia and Bhatri.

== Politics ==
=== Vidhan sabha constituencies ===
The following are the four Vidhan sabha constituencies of Nabarangpur district and the elected members of that area:

| No. | Constituency | Reservation* | Extent of the Assembly Constituency (Blocks) | Member of 14th Assembly | Party |
|---|---|---|---|---|---|
| 73 | Umarkote | ST | Raighar, Umarkote (NAC), Umarkote (part) | Nityananda Gond | BJP |
| 74 | Jharigam | ST | Jharigam, Chandahandi, Umarkote (part) | Narasing Bhatra | BJP |
| 75 | Nabarangpur | ST | Nabarangpur (M), Nabarangpur, Tentulikhunti, Nandahandi, Kosagumuda (part) | Gouri Shankar Majhi | BJP |
| 76 | Dabugam | ST | Dabugam, Papadahandi, Kosagumuda (part) | Manohar Randhari | BJD |

* Since all seats of Nabarangpur district are covered by ST Seats no SC seat is assigned.
