= Nabarangpur =

Town in Nabarangpur district, Odisha, India

Nabarangpur ନବରଙ୍ଗପୁର Nabarangapur, Nowrangpur
- Town
- Location in Odisha, India Nabarangpur (India)
- Coordinates: 19.23°N 82.55°E
- Country: India
- State: Odisha
- District: Nabarangpur district
- Municipality established: 20 July 1970
- Elevation: 557 m (1,827 ft)

Population (2011)
  - Total: 69,706

Languages
  - Official: Odia
- Time zone: UTC+5:30 (Indian Standard Time)
- PIN: 764059
- Telephone code: 06858
- Vehicle registration: OD 24
- Website: nabarangpur.odisha.gov.in

Nabarangpur (also spelled Nabarangapur and historically known as Nowrangpur) is a town and municipality in the Indian state of Odisha. It is the administrative headquarters of Nabarangpur district, situated in the southwestern part of the state, near the border with Chhattisgarh.

According to the 2011 Census of India, Nabarangpur town, including its outgrowths, had a population of 36,945, while the municipality proper had a population of 29,960.

Nabarangpur is an important administrative, agricultural and commercial centre of southwestern Odisha. The wider district is known for its significant tribal population, indigenous communities, traditional handicrafts, folk dances and natural landscapes. The region is often described as the Tribal Heartland of Odisha because of its distinctive tribal heritage and cultural traditions.

The district is also recognised for its agricultural production, particularly maize, paddy, millets, sugarcane and cashew nuts. Nabarangpur has been described as the Maize Basket of Odisha because of its substantial contribution to the state's maize production.

== History ==
=== Early history ===
The history of Nabarangpur is closely associated with the historical region of southern Odisha and the former Jeypore State. The wider region came under the influence of several ruling dynasties, including the Nala, Satavahana, Eastern Ganga, Somavamsi, Chindaka Naga, Matsya, Silavamsa and Suryavamsa dynasties.

The Nala dynasty was particularly influential in the early history of the region. Archaeological remains, inscriptions, sculptures and coins discovered at Podagada in the district provide evidence of the historical importance of the dynasty. Pushkari, identified through inscriptions found at Podagada, was an important capital of the Nala rulers during the fourth and fifth centuries.

=== Origin of the name ===
According to the Nabarangpur District Gazetteer, there is no definitive historical proof establishing the origin of the town's name. One local tradition associates the name with the Narang Paraja community, an indigenous group believed to have originally settled in an area known as Narangpadar.

Another interpretation connects the name with the expression meaning a place of nine colours. The name subsequently evolved through forms including Narangpur and Nowrangpur before becoming Nabarangpur.

=== Jeypore rulers and Chaitanya Deo ===
During the medieval and early modern periods, the region became associated with the Suryavamsi rulers of Jeypore. Nabarangpur functioned as a feudatory territory under the former Jeypore Estate.

According to the 1907 Gazetteer of the Vizagapatam District, the Nabarangpur and Gudari estates were granted in 1820 by Ramachandra Deo II of Jeypore to his nephews Krishna Deo and Narasimha Deo. Following the extinction of Krishna Deo's line of succession, the property passed to Chaitanya Deo, son of Narasimha Deo.

Chaitanya Deo administered the Nabarangpur Thana, a feudatory territory of the Jeypore Estate, from 1843 until his death in 1876. He is remembered for his administrative contributions and public works. Historical accounts record that he promoted the planting of avenues and groves and encouraged the construction of tanks and wells in villages throughout the estate.

=== Rani Sulochana Patta Mahadevi ===
Rani Sulochana Patta Mahadevi, also known locally as Rani Sulochana Dei, was an important historical personality associated with the former Nabarangpur estate.

Following the death of Chaitanya Deo in 1876, his three widows retained possession of the estate. A dispute subsequently arose between the widows and the Maharaja of Jeypore, who attempted to resume control of the property.

A compromise was eventually reached in 1904, under which the estate, excluding its forests, was handed over to the surviving widow, Sulochana Patta Mahadevi, for her lifetime. She administered the estate independently with the assistance of a Diwan. Following her death in 1912, the estate was incorporated into the Jeypore Estate.

=== Indian independence movement ===
The wider Nabarangpur region played an important role in the Indian independence movement, particularly during the Quit India Movement of 1942.

On 24 August 1942, freedom fighters and local demonstrators assembled near the Turi River at Papadahandi to protest against British colonial rule. During the confrontation, colonial police resorted to firing, resulting in the deaths of 19 freedom fighters and injuries to several others.

The incident became an important episode in the freedom movement of southern Odisha. A memorial, known as the Shahid Minar, was subsequently established at Papadahandi in remembrance of those who lost their lives.

=== Formation of Nabarangpur district ===
Following Indian independence in 1947, Nabarangpur remained part of the former Koraput district.

On 2 October 1992, Nabarangpur became a separate district following its separation from the erstwhile Koraput district. The formation of the district was intended to improve administration and facilitate development in the predominantly rural and tribal region.

== Geography and climate ==
Nabarangpur is situated in southwestern Odisha, near the state border with Chhattisgarh. The town is located at approximately 19°14′N latitude and 82°33′E longitude, at an elevation of around 557 metres above sea level.

The wider district covers approximately 5,294 square kilometres and is characterised by undulating plateaus, agricultural plains, low hills, river valleys and forested landscapes. The region forms part of the Eastern Ghats landscape.

The district contains several rivers, streams, reservoirs and waterfalls. The Indravati River is one of the most important rivers of the region. Other important rivers include the Tel, Bhaskel, Narangi, Banjari, Amarti, Singari and Turi.

=== Indravati River and mythology ===
The Indravati River is one of the most important rivers associated with Nabarangpur district. It originates in the hills of Kalahandi district, flows through Odisha and Chhattisgarh and eventually joins the Godavari River system.

The river supports agriculture, irrigation, fisheries and local livelihoods. Its basin is an important agricultural region, and several settlements are situated along its banks.

The Indravati also holds religious and mythological significance in Hindu traditions. According to the Nabarangpur District Gazetteer, the river occupies an important place in Puranic literature. The Gazetteer records that the Brahma Purana associates the river with Mandakini and mentions a traditional account attributing its creation to the sage Atri.

The wider Dandakaranya region, through which the Indravati flows, is also associated with the geographical and cultural traditions of the Ramayana. The forests of this broader region are traditionally connected with the forest exile of Lord Rama, Sita and Lakshmana. Such associations form part of the religious and cultural heritage of the region, although a specific Ramayana episode involving the origin of the Indravati River is not established by the cited historical account.

=== Climate ===
Nabarangpur experiences a tropical monsoon climate. Summers are generally warm, while the monsoon season brings substantial rainfall to the region. Winters are comparatively mild and characterised by cooler temperatures.

The district's elevation, forests and surrounding hills contribute to its varied local climatic conditions compared with the coastal regions of Odisha.

== Demographics ==
According to the 2011 Census of India, Nabarangpur town, including its outgrowths, had a population of 36,945. The municipality proper had a population of 29,960.

The wider Nabarangpur district had a population of approximately 1.22 million in the 2011 Census. Scheduled Tribes constituted approximately 55.8 per cent of the district's population, making it one of the tribal-dominated districts of Odisha.

Odia is the official language of Odisha and is widely spoken in the town. Other languages and dialects spoken across the district include Bhotra, Gond, Paraja, Desia, Hindi and Telugu, among others.

Major tribal communities in the district include the Bhotra, Gond, Paraja, Kandha, Omanatya, Halva and Saora communities. Their traditional customs, languages, festivals and cultural practices contribute significantly to the region's identity.

== Economy ==
Agriculture is one of the principal economic activities in Nabarangpur district. The region is an important agricultural production centre in Odisha, particularly for maize.

Major agricultural products include maize, paddy, millets, pulses, sugarcane, cashew nuts and other crops. Maize cultivation is particularly important in Umerkote, Jharigam, Kosagumuda, Papadahandi and other agricultural areas of the district.

The district has been described as the Maize Basket of Odisha because of its substantial contribution to the state's maize production. According to a 2026 report, maize was cultivated across approximately 65,000 hectares in the district, producing around 7.8 lakh metric tonnes annually.

Forest products, livestock, fisheries and small-scale commercial activities also contribute to the district's economy.

Nabarangpur town serves as an important commercial centre for agricultural produce, retail trade, banking, transport and government-related services. Its markets connect farmers and traders from surrounding villages and administrative blocks.

== Tribal heritage and culture ==
Nabarangpur district is known for its rich tribal heritage and indigenous cultural traditions. The district has a significant tribal population, including the Paraja, Gond, Bhotra, Kandha and other indigenous communities.

The region's traditional cultural practices include folk music, group dances, indigenous handicrafts, agricultural celebrations and community festivals.

=== Traditional dances ===
Dhemsa is one of the most prominent traditional dances performed by tribal communities in Nabarangpur and the wider southern Odisha region. It is generally performed in groups during festivals, marriages, agricultural celebrations and community gatherings.

Other traditional cultural performances and folk forms are also associated with the district's indigenous communities.

=== Handicrafts ===
Traditional handicrafts form an important part of the district's cultural identity. Artisans produce wooden toys, decorative objects, religious artefacts, traditional jewellery and other handcrafted products.

The Dhanya Laxmi craft, made using paddy, is a distinctive traditional craft associated with the Dabugam area. Tribal paintings and traditional ornaments are also part of the local craft heritage.

=== Mondei festival ===
Mondei is one of the major traditional festivals celebrated in Nabarangpur district. It is generally associated with the post-harvest season and brings together people from different communities.

The celebrations include traditional music, folk dances, cultural performances, local crafts and community gatherings. The festival provides a platform for showcasing the district's indigenous traditions and cultural heritage.

== Tourism ==
Nabarangpur district has considerable tourism potential owing to its natural landscapes, rivers, reservoirs, waterfalls, temples, archaeological sites and tribal cultural heritage. The region offers opportunities for religious tourism, nature tourism, historical exploration and cultural tourism.

=== Religious sites ===
- Maa Bhandargharani Temple: Located in Nabarangpur town, the temple is dedicated to Goddess Bhandargharani, regarded as the presiding deity and protector of the locality. It attracts devotees from different parts of the district and neighbouring regions. The annual Ghata Yatra is an important religious celebration associated with the temple.
- Jagannath Temple: An important religious establishment in Nabarangpur town dedicated to Lord Jagannath.
- Maa Pendrani Temple: Situated in the Umerkote region, the temple is dedicated to Maa Pendrani and attracts devotees from surrounding areas. The shrine is associated with local religious traditions and legends.
- Jhadeswar Mahadev Temple: Situated in the Kelia region, this Shiva shrine is located in a hilly landscape of the Eastern Ghats and attracts devotees and visitors.

=== Dams and reservoirs ===
- Upper Indravati Dam and Reservoir: The Upper Indravati Project is a major multipurpose water and hydroelectric development associated with the Indravati River. The reservoir near Khatiguda is one of the major water bodies associated with Nabarangpur district. The project includes dams, dykes and connecting channels forming a reservoir system. It supports irrigation and hydroelectric power generation. Its surrounding hills and water landscapes also provide scenic views for visitors.

- Bhaskel Dam and Reservoir: Located in the Umerkote region, the Bhaskel reservoir is an important irrigation water body in the district. The reservoir supports irrigation and fisheries and is surrounded by natural landscapes. It is also identified as a potential tourism destination.

- Silati Dam and Reservoir: Situated in the Umerkote region, the Silati reservoir is another water body used for irrigation and fisheries in the district.

=== Waterfalls and natural attractions ===
- Chandandhara Waterfall: Situated in Jharigam block, Chandandhara is one of the recognised natural attractions of Nabarangpur district. The waterfall is surrounded by forested landscapes and rocky terrain. The site is also associated with a natural Shiva lingam and attracts devotees, particularly during Mahashivaratri.
- Gosein Dorah Waterfall: Also known as Goseindhara, this natural waterfall is located in the forested region of Jharigam block. It is known for its scenic surroundings and natural landscape.
- Bhairaghumar Waterfall: A natural waterfall located in the Kuhudi hill range near the Odisha–Chhattisgarh border in Chandahandi block. The waterfall is known for its scenic views of the surrounding hills and natural landscape. Its remote location and limited road connectivity have historically restricted tourist access.
- Phuljhori Waterfall: A natural waterfall in the Jharigam region, surrounded by hilly terrain and forested landscapes.
- Saidhara Waterfall: Another natural waterfall in the Jharigam region, known for its surrounding hills and forest environment.
- Ghumareswar Temple and Waterfall: Located in Jharigam block, this site combines a religious shrine dedicated to Lord Shiva with a natural waterfall. It is among the district's religious and natural attractions.
- Hirli Dongri Hill Park: Located near Nabarangpur town, Hirli Dongri is a hill area developed as a recreational and picnic destination. The location offers elevated views of the surrounding landscape and has facilities developed by the district administration.

=== Historical and archaeological attractions ===
- Podagada: Located near Umerkote, Podagada is an important archaeological site associated with the ancient Nala dynasty. The site contains inscriptions, sculptures, coins, ruined forts and remains of historical structures. Inscriptions discovered in the area provide information about Pushkari, the capital of the Nala rulers during the fourth and fifth centuries.
- Papadahandi Freedom Fighters Memorial: Papadahandi is an important historical location associated with the Quit India Movement of 1942. The Shahid Smruti Stambha commemorates the 19 freedom fighters who died during the colonial police firing near the Turi River.
- Papadahandi Shiva Temple: The temple is associated with the historical landscape of Papadahandi. The area contains the remains of an old fort and historical tanks. The District Gazetteer records that Chaitanya Deo recovered a black granite Shiva lingam from one of the tanks and installed it in the temple.

=== Tourism development ===
The Odisha government has identified several locations in Nabarangpur district for tourism infrastructure development. These include Bhaskel Dam, Chandandhara Waterfall, Bhairaghumar Waterfall, Mangaradora Waterfall, Podagada Hill, Mandadongri Shiva Shrine, Maa Bidri Temple, Maa Bhandargharani Temple and Maa Pendrani Temple. Tourism infrastructure projects at these locations have been reviewed by the state government as part of efforts to develop the district's tourism potential.

== Infrastructure ==
Nabarangpur town is the principal administrative, educational, healthcare and commercial centre of Nabarangpur district. It accommodates government offices, educational institutions, healthcare facilities, financial institutions and commercial establishments.

=== Municipal administration ===
Nabarangpur Municipality is responsible for municipal administration and civic services within the town.

The municipality was originally established as a Union Board under the Madras Local Bodies Act, 1920. It subsequently became a Notified Area Council on 1 July 1953 and was upgraded to a municipality on 20 July 1970.

The town houses the District Collectorate, district police administration, government departments and other administrative establishments.

=== Transport ===
Nabarangpur is connected to neighbouring towns and districts through a network of state highways and major district roads. Road connections link the town with Jeypore, Umerkote, Raipur and other parts of southern Odisha and neighbouring Chhattisgarh.

The town does not currently have an operational railway station. Jeypore Railway Station is one of the nearest railway stations serving the region. Proposed railway connectivity projects are expected to improve access to the wider railway network.

Jeypore Airport is one of the nearest airports serving the district, while Visakhapatnam International Airport provides a major regional air connection.

=== Education ===
Nabarangpur serves as an educational centre for students from surrounding rural and tribal areas. The town has several schools and higher educational institutions providing education in general, science, commerce and other disciplines.

Government and private educational institutions contribute to the educational infrastructure of the town and the wider district.

=== Healthcare ===
Healthcare services in Nabarangpur are provided through government hospitals, health centres, private clinics and diagnostic facilities. These institutions serve residents of the town and surrounding rural areas.

==== Government Medical College and Hospital ====
A Government Medical College and Hospital is being developed in Nabarangpur district as a major healthcare and educational infrastructure project.

On 13 February 2026, Odisha Chief Minister Mohan Charan Majhi laid the foundation stone for the proposed medical college and hospital at Patalguda in Nabarangpur district. The institution is planned over more than 50 acres and is expected to have 100 MBBS seats and a 420-bed hospital.

The project is expected to improve access to specialised healthcare and medical education in the district and neighbouring regions. A 2028 operational target has been discussed, subject to construction progress and regulatory approvals.

=== Electricity, water and civic facilities ===
The town is connected to the regional electricity distribution network and has municipal water supply and other essential civic services.

Municipal infrastructure includes roads, drainage systems, sanitation facilities, public spaces and local markets. These facilities support the town's role as the administrative and commercial centre of the district.

== Notable people ==
- Sriram Panda (born 1954) – Veteran Odia film actor, director and screenwriter, widely regarded as one of the prominent stars of Odia cinema. He began his film career with Dharitri (1972) and became particularly popular through films such as Jajabara (1975). He was selected for the prestigious Jayadev Award in 2012 in recognition of his contribution to Odia cinema. He subsequently left the film industry and became known as Swami Nitya Chaitanya.
- Sadashiva Tripathy (1910–1980) – Indian National Congress politician and former Chief Minister of Odisha, who served from 1965 to 1967. He was associated with Nabarangpur district.
- A. V. Swamy (1929–2019) – Social worker, freedom movement participant and former Member of Parliament in the Rajya Sabha, associated with Nabarangpur district.

== See also ==
- Nabarangpur district
- Jeypore
- Koraput district
- Odisha
- Indravati River
- Upper Indravati Project
- Quit India Movement

== History ==
=== Early history ===
The history of Nabarangpur is closely associated with the historical region of southern Odisha and the former Jeypore State. The wider region came under the influence of several ruling dynasties, including the Nala, Satavahana, Eastern Ganga, Somavamsi, Chindaka Naga, Matsya, Silavamsa and Suryavamsa dynasties.

The Nala dynasty was particularly influential in the early history of the region. Archaeological remains, inscriptions, sculptures and coins discovered at Podagada in the district provide evidence of the historical importance of the dynasty. Pushkari, identified through inscriptions found at Podagada, was an important capital of the Nala rulers.

=== Origin of the name ===
According to the Nabarangpur District Gazetteer, the name of the region is associated with Narangpadar and the Narang Paraja community. Local people are believed to have adopted the name Narangpur in recognition of the community. Over time, the name evolved into Nowrangpur and subsequently Nabarangpur.

=== Jeypore rulers and Chaitanya Deo ===
During the medieval and early modern periods, the region became associated with the Suryavamsi rulers of Jeypore. Nabarangpur functioned as a feudatory territory under the former Jeypore Estate.

Chaitanya Deo was one of the important historical rulers of Nabarangpur. He governed the Nabarangpur Thana, a feudatory region of the Jeypore Estate, from 1843 to 1876. According to the District Gazetteer, his administration contributed to the development of the region. Groves were established, temples were constructed, tanks and ponds were excavated, and trade centres and local markets developed during his rule.

Several traditional water bodies in the district are associated with his public works. The Gazetteer also records his involvement in the excavation of tanks and ponds for the benefit of local communities.

=== Rani Sulochana Dei ===
Rani Sulochana Dei, also referred to in historical accounts as Rani Sulochana Patta Mahadevi, is associated with the ruling family and the historical estate of Nabarangpur. Her name appears in accounts concerning the succession and administration of the former Nabarangpur estate following the death of Chaitanya Deo.

Her association with the region forms part of the history of the former princely administration and the transition of Nabarangpur into the larger Jeypore Estate. Further archival research is necessary to establish the detailed chronology of her administration and the succession arrangements.

=== Indian independence movement ===
The wider Nabarangpur region played a role in the Indian independence movement, particularly during the Quit India Movement of 1942.

On 24 August 1942, freedom fighters and local demonstrators assembled near the Turi River at Papadahandi to protest against British colonial rule. During the confrontation, colonial police resorted to firing, resulting in the deaths of 19 freedom fighters and injuries to several others.

The incident became an important episode in the freedom movement of southern Odisha. A memorial, known as the Shahid Minar, was subsequently established at Papadahandi in remembrance of those who lost their lives.

=== Formation of Nabarangpur district ===
Following Indian independence in 1947, Nabarangpur remained part of the former Koraput district. The region subsequently underwent administrative changes following the reorganisation of Odisha's districts.

On 2 October 1992, Nabarangpur became a separate district following its separation from the erstwhile Koraput district. The formation of the district was intended to improve administration and facilitate development in the predominantly rural and tribal region.

== Geography ==
Nabarangpur is situated in southwestern Odisha, near the state border with Chhattisgarh. The town is located at approximately 19°14′N latitude and 82°33′E longitude, at an elevation of around 557 metres above sea level.

The wider district covers approximately 5,291 square kilometres and is characterised by undulating plateaus, agricultural plains, low hills, river valleys and forested landscapes.

The district forms part of the Eastern Ghats landscape and contains several rivers, streams and waterfalls. The Indravati River is one of the most important rivers of the region. The Bhaskel River and other smaller river systems also support agriculture and local livelihoods.

=== Indravati River ===
The Indravati River is one of the principal rivers associated with Nabarangpur district. It originates in the hills of Kalahandi district in Odisha, flows through the southern part of the state and enters Chhattisgarh before eventually joining the Godavari River system.

The river supports irrigation, agriculture, fisheries and transportation in the surrounding areas. The Indravati Reservoir near Khatiguda is one of the major water bodies of the district.

The Indravati also has religious and mythological significance in local traditions. The Nabarangpur District Gazetteer records an association between the river and the sacred river traditions of Hindu mythology. It refers to the Brahma Purana's association of the river with Mandakini and mentions a traditional account connecting its origin with the sage Atri.

The wider Dandakaranya region, through which the Indravati flows, is also associated with the geographical and cultural traditions of the Ramayana. The river and its surrounding forests are sometimes discussed in the context of the traditional landscape associated with the forest exile of Lord Rama. However, a specific episode involving Lord Rama and the origin of the Indravati is not established by the cited district historical account.

=== Climate ===
Nabarangpur experiences a tropical monsoon climate. Summers are generally warm, while the monsoon season brings substantial rainfall to the region. Winters are comparatively mild and are characterised by cooler temperatures.

The district's elevation, forests and surrounding hills contribute to its relatively varied local climatic conditions compared with the coastal regions of Odisha.

== Demographics ==
According to the 2011 Census of India, Nabarangpur district had a population of 1,220,946. The district has a substantial Scheduled Tribe population and is home to several indigenous communities.

Odia is the official language of Odisha and is widely spoken in the town. Other languages and dialects spoken across the district include Bhotra, Gond, Paraja, Hindi and Telugu, among others.

Major tribal communities in the district include the Bhotra, Gond, Paraja, Kandha, Omanatya, Halva and Saora communities. Their traditional customs, languages, festivals and cultural practices contribute significantly to the region's identity.

== Economy ==
Agriculture is one of the principal economic activities in Nabarangpur district. The region is an important agricultural production centre in Odisha, particularly for maize.

Major agricultural products include maize, paddy, millets, pulses, sugarcane, cashew nuts and other crops. Maize cultivation is particularly important in Umerkote, Jharigam, Kosagumuda and other agricultural areas of the district.

The district has been described as the Maize Basket of Odisha because of its substantial contribution to the state's maize production. According to a 2026 report, maize was cultivated across approximately 65,000 hectares in the district, producing around 7.8 lakh metric tonnes annually.

Forest products, livestock, fisheries and small-scale commercial activities also contribute to the district's economy.

Nabarangpur town serves as an important commercial centre for agricultural produce, retail trade, banking, transport and government-related services. Its markets connect farmers and traders from surrounding villages and administrative blocks.

== Tribal heritage and culture ==
Nabarangpur district is known for its rich tribal heritage and indigenous cultural traditions. The district has a significant tribal population, including the Paraja, Gond, Bhotra, Kandha and other indigenous communities.

The region's traditional cultural practices include folk music, group dances, indigenous handicrafts, agricultural celebrations and community festivals.

=== Traditional dances ===
Dhemsa is one of the most prominent traditional dances performed by tribal communities in Nabarangpur and the wider southern Odisha region. It is generally performed in groups during festivals, marriages, agricultural celebrations and community gatherings.

Other traditional folk forms associated with the district include Rinjodi, Sailodi, Ghumura and Gond folk performances.

=== Handicrafts ===
Traditional handicrafts form an important part of the district's cultural identity. Artisans produce wooden toys, decorative objects, religious artefacts, traditional jewellery and other handcrafted products.

The Dhanya Laxmi craft, made using paddy, is a distinctive traditional craft associated with the Dabugaon area. Tribal paintings and traditional ornaments are also part of the local craft heritage.

=== Mondei festival ===
Mondei is one of the major traditional festivals celebrated in Nabarangpur district. It is generally associated with the post-harvest season and brings together people from different communities.

The celebrations include traditional music, folk dances, cultural performances, local crafts and community gatherings. The festival provides a platform for showcasing the district's indigenous traditions and cultural heritage.

== Tourism ==
Nabarangpur district has considerable tourism potential owing to its natural landscapes, rivers, reservoirs, waterfalls, temples, archaeological sites and tribal cultural heritage. The region offers opportunities for religious tourism, nature tourism, historical exploration and cultural tourism.

=== Religious sites ===
- Maa Bhandargharani Temple: Located in Nabarangpur town, the temple is dedicated to Goddess Bhandargharani, regarded as the presiding deity and protector of the locality. It attracts devotees from different parts of the district and neighbouring regions. The annual Ghata Yatra is an important religious celebration associated with the temple.
- Maa Pendrani Temple: Situated in the Umerkote region, the temple is dedicated to Maa Pendrani and attracts devotees from surrounding areas. The shrine is associated with local religious traditions and legends.
- Jagannath Temple: An important religious establishment in Nabarangpur town dedicated to Lord Jagannath.
- Jhadeswar Mahadev Temple: A Shiva shrine associated with the Kelia region, surrounded by hills and forested landscapes.

=== Dams and reservoirs ===
- Upper Indravati Dam and Reservoir: The Upper Indravati Project is a major multipurpose water and hydroelectric development associated with the Indravati River. The reservoir near Khatiguda is one of the largest and most important water bodies associated with Nabarangpur district. The project includes dams, dykes, connecting channels and a hydroelectric power station. The reservoir supports irrigation, fisheries and transportation between parts of Nabarangpur and Kalahandi districts. Its surrounding hills and water landscapes also provide scenic views for visitors.
- Bhaskel Dam and Reservoir: Located in the Umerkote region, the Bhaskel reservoir is an important irrigation water body in the district. It is surrounded by natural landscapes and supports agricultural activities and fisheries. The reservoir is also identified as a potential tourism and recreational destination.
- Silati Dam and Reservoir: Situated in the Umerkote region, the Silati reservoir is another man-made water body used for irrigation and fisheries.

=== Waterfalls and natural attractions ===
- Chandandhara Waterfall: Situated in the Jharigam region, Chandandhara is one of the recognised natural attractions of Nabarangpur district. The waterfall is surrounded by forested landscapes and rocky terrain. A Shiva shrine is located near the waterfall, attracting visitors and devotees.
- Gosein Dorah Waterfall: Also known as Gosein Dorah, this natural waterfall is located in the district's forested landscape. It is associated with local religious and cultural traditions and is among the natural attractions described in the District Gazetteer.
- Bhairaghumar Waterfall: Bhairaghumar, also written as Bhairaghumara, is a natural waterfall in Nabarangpur district. It is known locally for its natural surroundings and scenic landscape. It has also been mentioned among the locations considered for tourism infrastructure development in the district. Nabarangapur had a population of 12,20,946. Males constitute 49.53% of the population and 50.47% are females.

Nabarangpur has an average literacy rate of 82.4%, higher than the national average of 74.0%.

== Politics ==
Nabarangpur is often referred to as the land of Late Sadhashiv Tripathy the erstwhile chief minister of Odisha and a freedom fighter. He was elected to the Odisha Legislative Assembly for four consecutive terms first in 1951 then in 1957, 1961, and 1967. He served as the revenue minister of Odisha for a long time. He served as the Chief Minister of Odisha between 1965 February 21 to 1967 March 8.Habibulla Khan of INC was elected as the MLA from Nabarangpur Assembly Constituency in 1977, 1980, 1985, 1990, 1995, 2000 and 2004. He represented INC(I) in the 1980 elections. The current MLA is Sadasiva Pradhani of (BJD) who was elected in 2019. In 2024 Balabhadra Majhi is an MP from BJP. Jagannath Tripathy, a freedom fighter was also the MLA of Nabarangpur.
