= Koraput district =

- District of Odisha
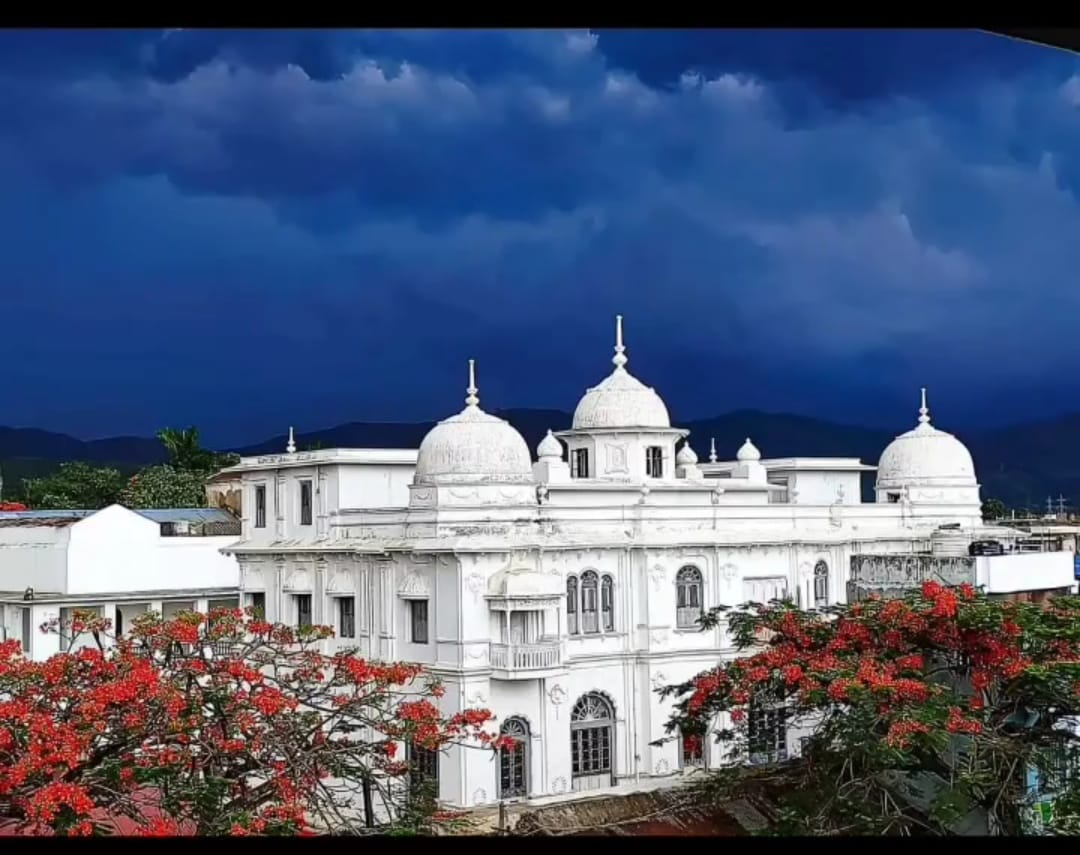
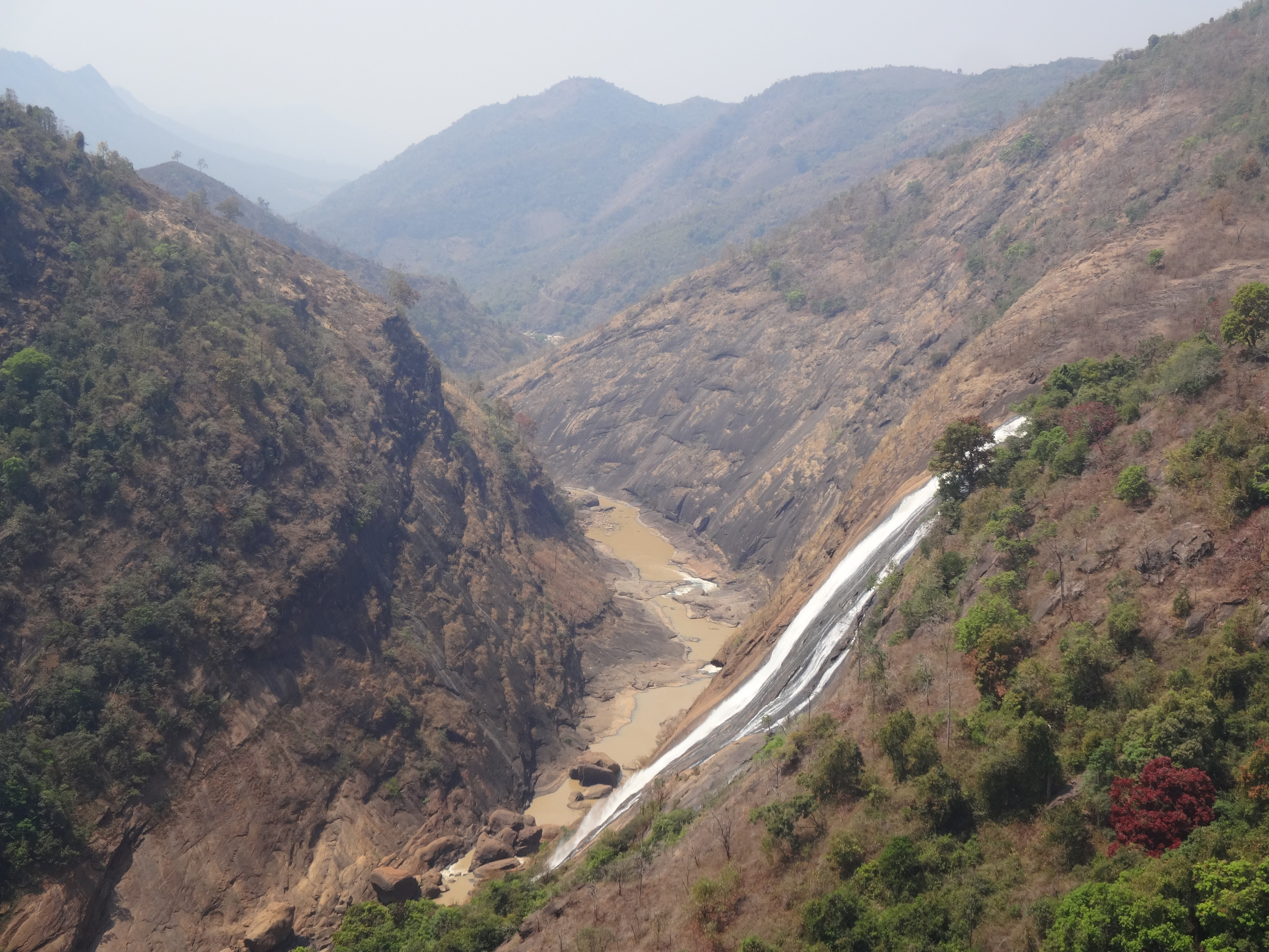
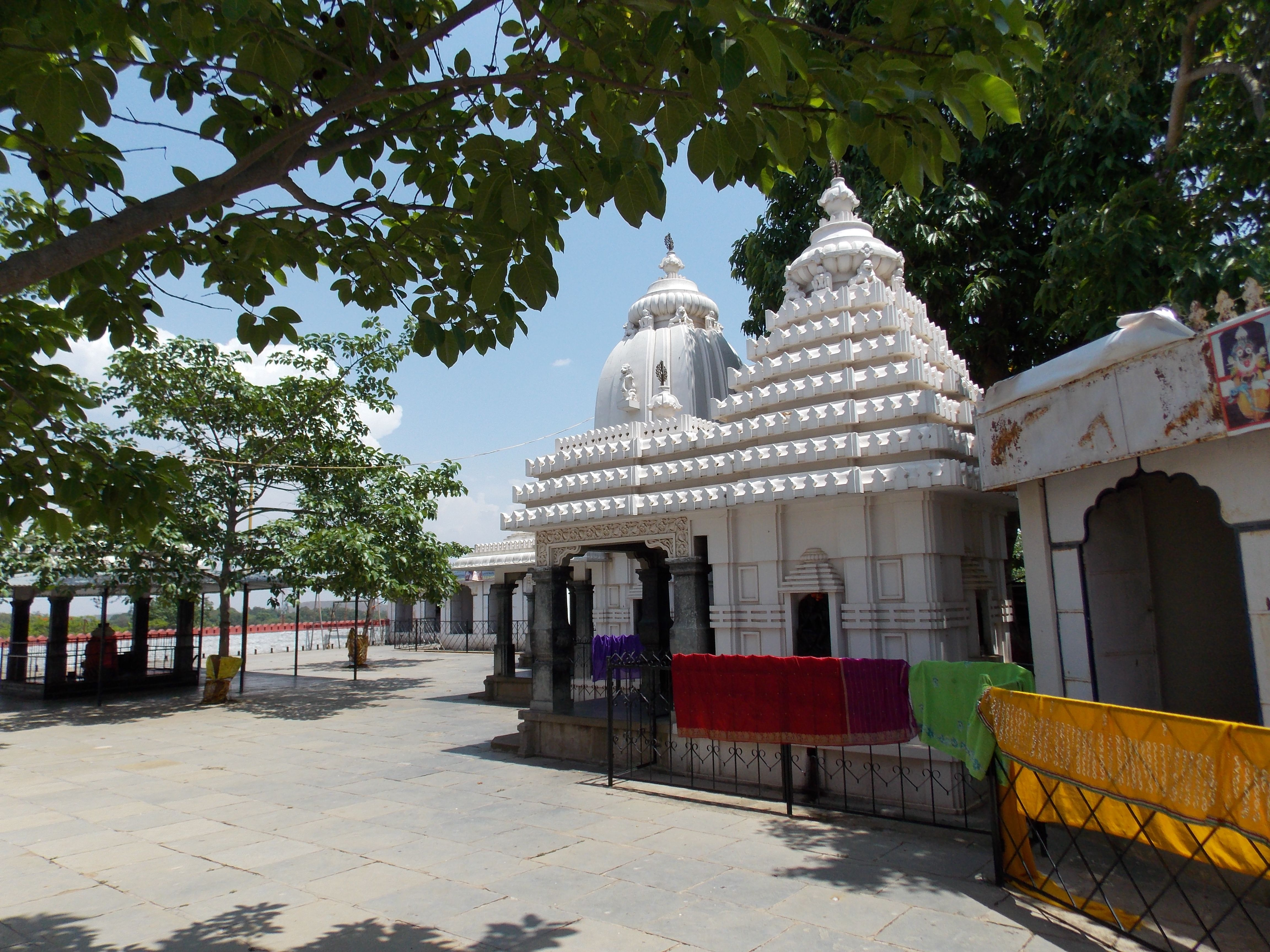
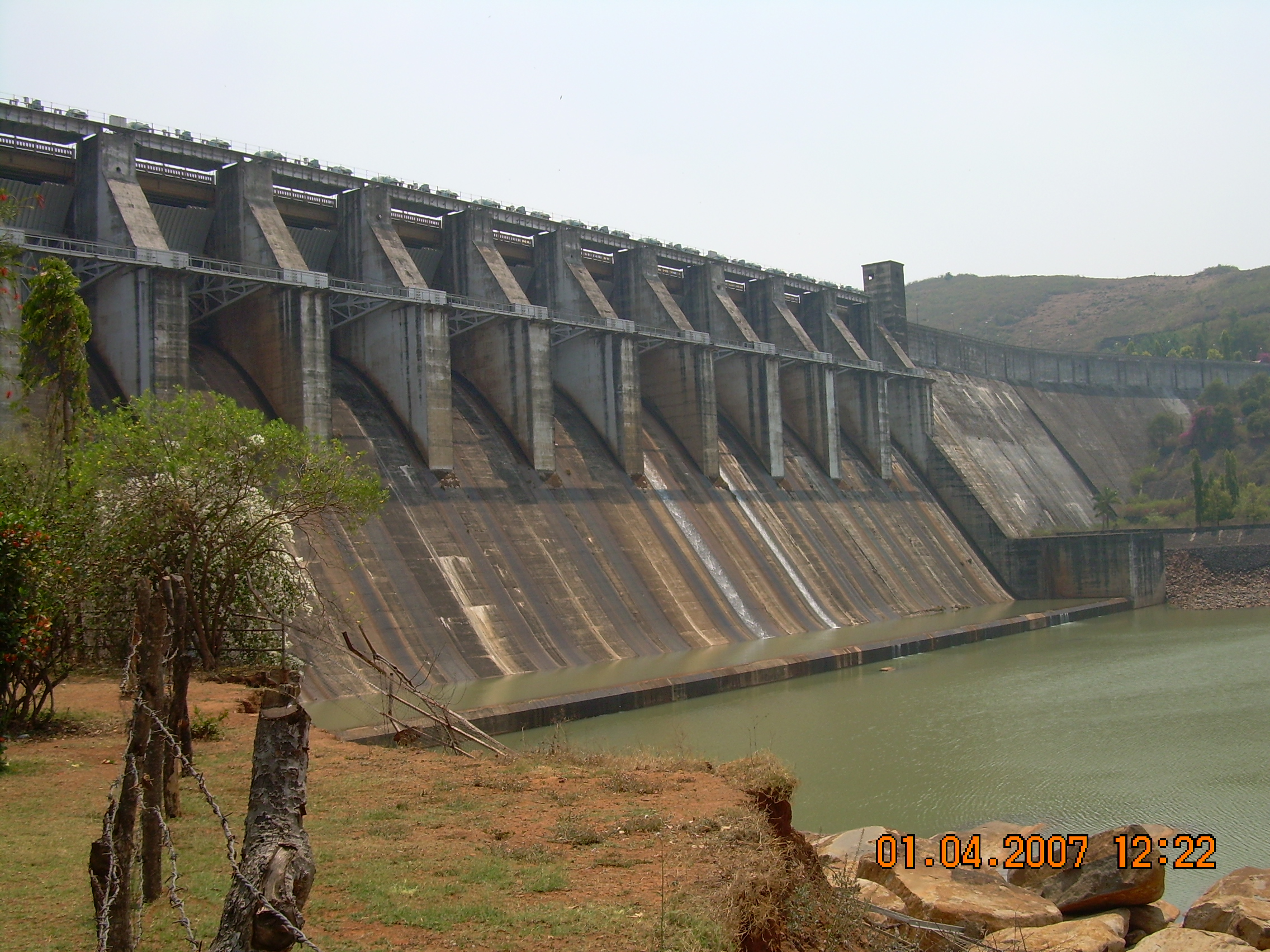
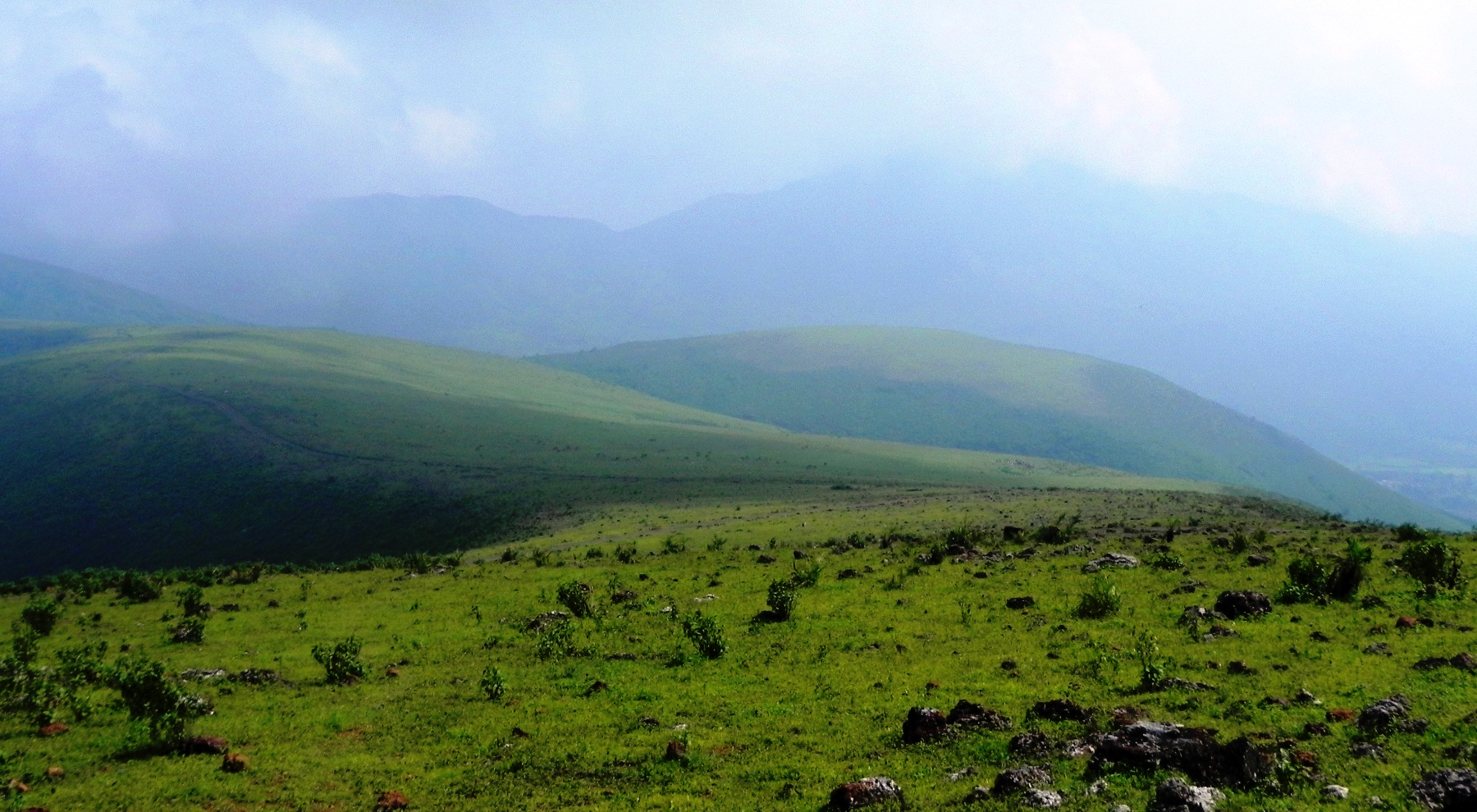
- Clockwise from top-left: Monument at Jeypore, Duduma Waterfalls, Kolab Dam, Deomali, Jagannath Temple at Koraput

- Location in Odisha
- Coordinates: 18.8083°N 82.7083°E
- Country: India
- State: Odisha
- Headquarters: Koraput

Government
  - Collector & District Magistrate: V. Keerthi Vasan, IAS

Area
  - Total: 8,807 km^{2} (3,400 sq mi)

Population (2011)
  - Total: 1,379,647
  - Density: 156.7/km^{2} (405.7/sq mi)

Languages
  - Official: Odia
  - Local: Kui, Kuvi, Desia, Bodo Parja, Gutob
- Time zone: UTC+5:30 (IST)
- PIN: 764 020
- Vehicle registration: OD-10
- Sex ratio: 1.038 ♂/♀
- Literacy: 49.21%
- Lok Sabha constituency: Koraput (ST)
- Vidhan Sabha constituency: 5: 141-Laxmipur (ST) 142-Kotpad (ST) 143-Jeypore 144-Koraput (SC) 145-Pottangi (ST)
- Climate: Aw (Köppen)
- Precipitation: 1,522 millimetres (59.9 in)
- Avg. summer temperature: 38 °C (100 °F)
- Avg. winter temperature: 12 °C (54 °F)
- Website: koraput.nic.in

Koraput district is a district of India in southern Odisha, with its headquarters at the town of Koraput. The district is located in the Eastern Ghats and is known for its hilly terrain, rich and diverse mineral deposits and its tribal culture. The district headquarters town of Koraput and its largest city, Jeypore are major centres of trade and commerce for South Odisha and located on an important road connecting Visakhapatnam to Raipur.

== Etymology ==
Koraput district derives its name from its headquarters, the town of Koraput. According to Mr. R.C.S. Bell, the name of the town is Kora-Putti or “the hamlet of the Nux-vomica".

Some opine that the word is derived from "Khora," a tribal people who still inhabit nearby villages. According to the second theory, Koraput is a corrupted form of ‘Karaka-Pentho’. Karaka literally means ‘hail-stone’. Another opinion is often found that the term Kora was the name of a Sun God who was worshipped by the local tribals in ancient times. Hence the town was so named.

It is also believed that one ‘Khora Naiko’ laid foundation of the village during the time of Nandapur kings. He hailed probably from Ranpur and served under the Nandapur kings in the Militia, and for his faithful and meritorious services he was permitted to establish this village which was named after him as Khora Putu, and later on the name has been abbreviated to ‘Koraput.

== Geography ==
Koraput district is located between 18 degree 13’ and 19 degree 10’ North Latitudes and 82 degree 5’ and 83 degree 23’ East Longitudes. It shares its borders with Rayagada District, Nabarangpur district, Kalanhandi district on the north, with Bastar district of Chhattisgarh on the west, with Malkangiri District on the south and with Alluri Sitharama Raju and Parvathipuram Manyam districts of Andhra Pradesh on the east. Its area is 8,807 km^{2}, making it the third largest district of Odisha after Mayurbhanj and Sundargarh. About twenty one villages in the Kotia Gram Panchayat are the subject of a long pending territorial dispute with the State of Andhra Pradesh.

== History ==
The early history of the district is obscure owing to the absence of written records. Its location in the hills, isolation from means of communication and the dense forests all around served to keep the district politically separate from the nearby plains on both sides. The earliest event that can be fixed with certainty is the acquisition of the tract by the Kingdom of Jeypore sometime in the 15th century. Before this, it was probably ruled by the Silavamsi Dynasty. Ruins of 10th century Jain temples in the district point to a presence of that sect as well. The Jeypore Rajas became tributaries to the Qutb Shahi Dynasty of Hyderabad by 1580. This suzerainty later passed to the Mughals, the Nizam of Hyderabad and finally descended to the East India Company when the Northern Circars were ceded to them by Emperor Shah Alam in 1765.

After cession, the district formed a part of the Madras Presidency but was largely left in the hands of the local Zamindars owing to its remote location. For administrative purposes, the entire area from the foothills of the Eastern Ghats to the boundaries of Bastar State was added to the Visakhapatnam District. This included the present day Rayagada, Malkangiri and Nabarangpur districts as well. The Collector of the District functioned in an additional capacity as Agent to the Governor of Madras in this area and exercised significant powers of criminal justice, revenue and civil law. The usual Civil and Criminal procedure codes of British India were not applied and the tract was known as the Agency. In 1863, two Assistant Agents were appointed at Jeypore and Parvatipuram to aid the Agent in his duties.

Except for a short-lived experiment of clubbing Agency areas of Ganjam, East Godavari District and Vishakhapatnam under a Commissioner in 1920, the administrative system remained unchanged till 1 April 1936 when almost all of the Agency areas of Vishakhapatnam District along with the associated zamindaris were clubbed together to form the undivided Koraput District. The district, along with Sambalpur District and the coastal districts of Ganjam, Balasore, Puri, Cuttack and Angul together constituted a new Orissa Province of British India. It was the first linguistic province of India and Koraput became its largest district in size. A District Magistrate was appointed who was assisted by two Sub Divisional Magistrates at Rayagada and the headquarters. The district had a total of 8 Talukas - later replaced by Tahsils and Blocks. Nabarangpur subdivision was created in 1941, followed by Gunupur and Malkangiri subdivisions in 1962 and Jeypore some years later. Finally, the district was divided into four new districts in 1992 - the Jeypore and Koraput subdivisions together constituted the new truncated district of Koraput.

The district was severely affected by Naxalism after 2000, though instances of violence have come down after 2014. It is currently a part of the Red Corridor and has extensive deployment of police and paramilitary forces at sensitive places.

== Geography and Climate ==
Koraput comes under the Eastern Ghat Highland Agro climatic Zone. It is composed of two separate plateaus at an average elevation of 3000 and 2000 feet respectively which are separated from each other and the surrounding plains by a ring of hills.

The 3000 feet plateau forms the boundary of the district with Andhra Pradesh and part of Rayagada district. A line of hills marks its outer boundary to the east reaching a height of 5486 feet at Deomali, the highest peak of Odisha, near Pottangi and 5316 feet at Sinkaram Gutta near Araku on the Andhra Pradesh border. Most of the hills have been denuded of forests due to generations of shifting cultivation and lack any major wildlife. The rainfall averages approximately 160 cm and falls in the Monsoon months of July–August. The plateau itself is marked by undulating hills and valleys through which numerous streams run down to join the Indravati to the north and the tributaries of the Godavari to the south. Most of the land is given over to the cultivation of paddy, ragi and flax. Narayanapatna and Bandhugaon blocks of the district are located before the ring of hills as noted above and geographically form a part of the Nagavali River valley, being located at a significantly lower altitude. The district headquarter town of Koraput is located on this plateau, as are most of the industrial areas of the district.

The Jeypore subdivision is a part of the 2000 feet plateau and forms approximately the western third of the district. It is divided from the 3000 feet plateau by a range of hills that runs from the Malkangiri border to the Indravati river. Low hills, some of them reaching to about 3000 feet mark this plateau. They are occasionally covered with jungle but most of the land is given over to paddy cultivation. The plateau gradually slopes west towards Bastar and falls through another ring of hills to the lower plains of Malkangiri to the south. The rainfall is slightly higher and averages about 190 cm annually.

The district overall has a warm and humid type of climate, though significantly more pleasant than the rest of Odisha. Mean Maximum summer temperature is 34.1 C and Mean Minimum Winter temperature is 10.4 C. The temperature on the 3000 feet plateau is often much lower and can approach close to freezing during peak winter at certain places.

Three large rivers flow through Koraput district. The Indravati rises in Kalahandi District and is dammed immediately afterwards, forming a large reservoir - the backwaters of which have cut off certain villages in Dasmantapur Block of Koraput. The river then forms the boundary between Koraput and Nabarangpur district throughout before entering Chhattisgarh near Nagarnar, slightly north of the main Jeypore-Jagdalpur road.

The Kolab River (known as the Sabari River in its later course) rises near the Andhra Pradesh border at Sinkaram. It then flows north west in a winding course before reaching the Kolab Dam slightly south of Koraput town. The massive reservoir has a catchment area of 1630 sq km and spans the Sadar, Semiliguda and Nandapur blocks of the district. After the dam, the river descends onto the 2000 feet plateau at Bagra near Jeypore through a small cataract before flowing north west and then suddenly south in Kundura block. It then enters the Bastar district before turning east again and forming the border with Koraput. It finally flows into Malkangiri and onwards to the Godavari River.

The Machchkund (better known as the Sileru River) enters the district near Chatwa on the Araku road. It forms the boundary between Odisha and Andhra Pradesh for many kilometers before the Jalaput Dam. It then continues along the southern boundary of the district in a series of rapids before falling down 540 feet at Duduma Waterfalls. The river is tapped here for the Machchkund Power Plant. It then flows through a close gorge through Malkangiri before going on to join the Sabari River.

== Administration ==
The district administration is headed by a Collector and District Magistrate, usually called the Collector who combines in his office the roles of revenue collection, law and order maintenance and implementation of development programmes. He is assisted at headquarters by an Additional District Magistrate (ADM) and by two Sub Collectors cum Sub Divisional Magistrates posted at Koraput and Jeypore for the first two roles. Below subdivision level, the district is divided into 14 Blocks which are co-terminus with Tahsils. While the former deals with the development aspect, the latter is a revenue unit. The Block Development Officer (BDO) and Tahsildar cum Executive Magistrate are the respective heads of each. The Collector and one of the Sub Collectors are usually officers of the Indian Administrative Service while the other officers belong to the Odisha Administrative Service.

The 14 Blocks/Tahsils in Koraput district under two sub-divisions are listed in the following table.

14 Tahasils/Blocks
| # | Koraput Sub-Division | Jeypore Sub-Division |
|---|---|---|
| 1 | Koraput | Jeypore |
| 2 | Bandhugaon | Boipariguda |
| 3 | Dasamantapur | Borigumma |
| 4 | Laxmipur | Kotpad |
| 5 | Machhakund (Lamtaput) | Kundura |
| 6 | Nandapur | |
| 7 | Narayanpatna | |
| 8 | Pottangi | |
| 9 | Similiguda | |

In addition to the officers noted above, a chief development officer cum executive officer, Zila Parishad, usually belonging to the Indian Administrative Service is posted at Koraput. He supervises the functioning of the BDOs directly and reports to the Collector who is ex officio Chief Executive Officer of the Zila Parishad. Various line departments like education, health care, agriculture are headed by officers of the rank of Deputy Collectors who are also directly under the operational control of the Collector. All departments also have a parallel setup at the block level with the BDO directly supervising the field level functionaries. Each block is further divided into Gram Panchayats. Koraput has a total of 240 Panchayats which are headed by an elected head called the Sarpanch assisted by an executive officer.

The four urban areas of Koraput, Kotpad, Sunabeda and Jeypore are each headed by an executive officer who report to the Collector through the Project Director, District Urban Development Agency.

Maintenance of law and order is supervised by the Superintendent of Police (SP), an officer of the Indian Police Service. The SP is technically under the Collector but in practice is almost completely independent except for certain statutory functions. He is assisted by Additional and Deputy SPs at the headquarters and by SDPOs at police subdivision levels. The district has a total of 23 thanas or Police Stations, each headed by an Inspector in-charge. Owing to the Naxalite issue, Koraput has a heavier than usual police presence and companies of Border Security Force, Central Reserve Police Force and the Special Operations Group of the Odisha Police are deployed throughout the district.

There are two Divisional Forest Officers posted in the District for each subdivision. They belong to the Indian Forest Service and are responsible for the preservation of wildlife and management of forests.

The civil and criminal justice system are under the District and Sessions Judge at Jeypore. He is assisted by Additional District Judges, Civil Judges (Senior and Junior) Divisions and Sub Divisional Judicial Magistrates. The Collector, ADM and SDMs are also Executive Magistrates and report to the District and Sessions Judge in that capacity.

The entire district is a designated area under the 5th Schedule of the Indian Constitution. This means that sale of tribal land to non-tribals is prohibited. In addition, there are other legal and cultural protections extended to the tribal population of the district.

== Demographics ==
Historical population
| Year | Pop. | ±% |
|---|---|---|
| 1901 | 297,440 | — |
| 1911 | 357,588 | +20.2% |
| 1921 | 346,438 | −3.1% |
| 1931 | 408,568 | +17.9% |
| 1941 | 484,348 | +18.5% |
| 1951 | 544,286 | +12.4% |
| 1961 | 593,300 | +9.0% |
| 1971 | 715,139 | +20.5% |
| 1981 | 858,506 | +20.0% |
| 1991 | 1,029,577 | +19.9% |
| 2001 | 1,180,637 | +14.7% |
| 2011 | 1,379,647 | +16.9% |
Source: Census of India

According to the 2011 census Koraput district has a population of 1,379,647, roughly equal to the nation of Eswatini or the US state of Hawaii. This gives it a ranking of 356th in India (out of a total of 640). The district has a population density of 156 inhabitants per square kilometre (400/sq mi). Its population growth rate over the decade 2001-2011 was 16.63%. Koraput has a sex ratio of 1031 females for every 1000 males, significantly higher than the national average of 940 and a literacy rate of 49.21%, much lower than the national figure. 16.39% of the population lives in urban areas. Scheduled Castes make up 14.21% of the population while 50.60% of the population hails from Scheduled Tribes. The district has one of the highest tribal populations in Odisha and is a Scheduled District under the Constitution of India. This prohibits sale and purchase of tribal land by non-tribals. As many as 51 different tribes have been noted in the undivided district - each with its own language and culture.

The largest tribe in the current district are the Parojas, literally meaning "subject", a generic term applying to many different tribal communities in Koraput. They are a significant population in the south and west, on the higher plateau regions. Almost all speak an Odia dialect as their mother tongue. The community has a population of around 2.2 lakhs.

The second largest community are the Khonds, who mainly live in the eastern mountains and have a population of 2 lakhs. Other major communities include the Bhottada, Gadaba and Bhumia.

The non tribal population is mostly of the castes and communities common to the rest of Odisha, and the Scheduled Caste population is predominantly from the Domba community. The only addition here is of a substantial Telugu element. The Telugus form an important commercial class and are also to be found in Government employment.

=== Languages ===
Languages of Koraput district (2011)
1. Odia (53.9%)
2. Desia (12.2%)
3. Kui (10.2%)
4. Proja (9.12%)
5. Telugu (3.46%)
6. Kuvi (2.81%)
7. Gadaba (2.10%)
8. Bhatri (1.49%)
9. Bhuiyan (1.35%)
10. Others (3.33%)

At the time of the 2011 Census of India, 53.88% of the population in the district spoke Odia, 12.25% Desia, 10.21% Kui, 9.12% Proja, 3.46% Telugu, 2.81% Kuvi, 2.10% Gadaba, 1.49% Bhatri and 1.35% Bhuiyan as their first language.

As regards the tribal dialects of Koraput district in Orissa, it may be noted that no proper survey has ever been made. But attempts have been made by different individuals to make a study of the various tribal languages of the district. Kui, as noted above, is the mostly widely spoken of the tribal dialects. The percentage of people speaking tribal language in Koraput district has reduced from 37 percent in 1931 census to less than 20 percent today. A large number of tribals of the district have adopted non-tribal languages as Odia is the medium of instruction in Government schools.

Standard Odia as used in the district is the same as that in the rest of the state. However, the spoken Odia, a dialect called Desia, used has significant differences from that of Coastal Odisha. An important marker is the lack of stress on the last consonant of a word. This is spoken rapidly and the schwa is often dropped. Many words used are now obsolete in Standard Odia or are considered rude. The use of the respectful pronoun apana is rare and even elders are referred to using the more familiar pronoun tume used for those similar or younger in age.

Many tribals inhabiting the hills separating the two states speak a mixture of Odia and Telugu. Narayanapatna, located on the other side of the hills, also has a large Telugu speaking population. This language is virtually the same as that spoken in Srikakulum.

Another languages include Bhatri and Halbi, which falls within the Odia language group but only shares about 60% lexical similarity with Oriya. It is spoken along the border with Bastar and is a language that is midway between Odia and Marathi language.

=== Religion ===
Religions in Koraput district (2011)
| Religion | Percent |
| Hinduism | 93.80% |
| Christianity | 4.97% |
| Islam | 0.64% |
| Other or not stated | 0.59% |

Hinduism is the dominant religion of the district with more than 93.8% of the population being returned as Hindus in the Census of 2011. However, in practice, there exist significant differences in the identification with mainstream Hinduism. Almost all tribes have a distinction between a Hindu-ised segment that follows the rites and rituals of Hinduism and another one that still worships the indigenous deities and follows rules of worship that are different from the general practice of the faith. Intermarriage and dining together are often the differentiating markers between these groups. Some of these deities include Jakari and Thakurani, who are worshipped by animal sacrifice like other folk religions. Most villages will have a stone or tree where the deity of the village is believed to reside.

Christianity is practiced by approximately 5% of the population, however some figures estimate it to be much more than that. The Jeypore Evangelical Lutheran Church which was founded by German Missionaries of The Schleswig Holstein Evangelical Lutheran Mission Society of Germany (SHELM) has been active in Koraput since 1882. Adherents mostly belong to the Scheduled Castes. Both Koraput and Jeypore have large churches while smaller ones can be found throughout the district ranging from various Pentecostal and Evangelical Congregations, The Jeypore Evangelical Lutheran Church alone has more than 2,50,000 members.

Muslims form a minuscule proportion of the population owing to the district's isolation from the plains. Most Muslims are recent migrants from the rest of Odisha who are employed at Koraput, Jeypore or at the NALCO unit at Damanjodi. However, the village of Thuba in Nandapur block has a community that is native to the district and is probably descended from demobilised Qutb Shahi soldiers who had invaded Koraput around the 16th century. Scattered Islamic shrines can also be found at Narayanapatna which had a small Muslim community till about a century ago.

Minuscule communities of Sikhs, Buddhists and Jains are also found in the towns. Most of them are migrants from North India who are involved in trade and commerce. The Buddhists are Tibetan refugees who deal in woolen clothes.

== Economy ==
In 2006 the Ministry of Panchayati Raj named Koraput one of the country's 250 most backward districts (out of a total of 640). It is one of the 19 districts in Odisha currently receiving funds from the Backward Regions Grant Fund Programme (BRGF).

=== Agriculture ===
The district economy mainly depends on agriculture and which mainly depends on rainfall. The rainfall depends on South-West monsoon. Out of total cropping area of 296000ha in Koraput, irrigation potential in Kharif is 30.71% and in Rabi is 21.51%. Generally crops grown during Rabi like Paddy, Wheat, Maize, Ragi, Mung, Biri, Groundnut, Mustard, Field Pea, Sunflower etc. needs assured irrigation.

Jeypore tract of the Koraput district is known as one of the centres of origin of rice. The people of Koraput district, notably the adivasis have generated and conserved many indigenous cultivars of rice that are suitable for both dryland and wetland cultivation. The Food and Agricultural Organisation (FAO) in 2012 recognised the service of the communities of Koraput in ensuring food security by declaring the Koraput district as a Global Agricultural Heritage Site

=== Major Industries ===
There are only five Large Scale industries located in the district manufacturing & Processing Alumina, Paper, Cement, Aeronautical Engine & hydro electricity. The general pattern of non-agricultural employment, however, leans heavily towards small-scale and household industries

- Hindustan Aeronautics Limited(HAL) - Sunabeda
- NALCO-Damanjodi
- BILT PAPERMILL-Jeypore (defunct) (company filed for bankruptcy in 2020)
- Kolab Hydroelectric Power Station
- Macha kunda Hydroelectric power station Under Lamptaput Block
- Kodingamali bauxite mines

=== Minerals ===
The principal economic mineral deposits of Koraput district are Limestone & Bauxite, besides this, occurrence of China clay, Nepheline Synite, Gold, Black & Multi colored rocks named as Decorative Stone are also found in this district. The principal mines in the district are

- Panchpatmali Bauxite Mines of M/s. National Aluminum & Co. Ltd.
- Maliparbat Bauxite Mines of M/s. Hindalco Industries Ltd.,
- Ampavally Limestone Mines of M/s. Odisha Mining Corporation Ltd. and M/s. Industrial Development Corporation of Odisha Ltd.

== Places of interest ==
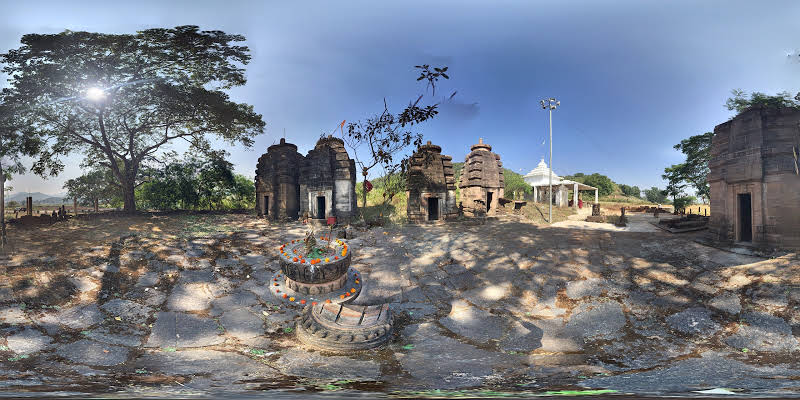
Subei Jain temple

=== Subai Jain temples ===
Subai Jain temples complex consists of 5 temples built in 4th century. One temple is famous for its rare images of the tirthankaras surrounding an image of Rishabhanatha. An idol of a four-armed Tara (a Jain yakshi) in the temple complex is also noteworthy. A Parab festival is organised by the temple management every year. A 4 feet (1.2 m) Jain idol was discovered in 2020 during excavation.

== Naxals ==
Naxalism is a serious matter of concern in south Odisha, including Koraput district, since around 2000. Earlier, the Naxalite activities were confined to districts such as Malkangiri, which share its borders with the neighboring states. With time, the Naxal activities has spread to Koraput as well as other tribal-dominated districts like Rayagada and Nabarangpur. The inaccessible hilly terrain, dense forests, lack of development, grievances of the tribals and poor, and the absence of administration have been conducive to the spread of left-wing extremism in Odisha. The seriousness of the problem was underlined by a co-ordinated Naxalite attack on the District Headquarters and armoury at Koraput on February 6, 2004. Another prominent leader, Nachika Linga, president of Chasia Mula Adivasi Sangh with Maoist links, organized tribals of Narayanpatna block against moneylenders and landlords who had taken their lands and in 2009 marched on the Narayanpatna police station.

Naxal group, namely People's War Group (PWG), has carried out numerous operations (attacks on rich farmers, police, bureaucrats and politicians, loots from godowns) within last few years in Koraput as well as in its neighboring districts. CoBRA BN of CRPF was deployed here for this purpose and it has helped to reduce Naxal activities to a large extent.

== Transport ==
Owing to its hilly terrain, transport in Koraput is dependent upon certain trunk roads that climb up the passes on the Eastern Ghats. National Highway 26 takes off from National Highway 16 near Vizianagaram. It enters the district before Sunki and rises to around 3500 feet at Ralegada through a number of sharp curves. It then descends onto the 3000 feet plateau and passes Pottangi and Kunduli before meeting the alternative road to Vishakhapatnam through Araku at Similiguda. The road then passes Koraput and descends through a steep ghat to Jeypore before going straight north through Borigumma to Nabarangpur. NH 63 takes off from this road at Borigumma and proceeds straight west through Kotpad to Jagdalpur in Bastar. Major District Roads connect the road to other parts of the district.

Secondary major roads include NH 326 that enters from Rayagada before passing through Lakshmipur and Kakirigumma to join NH 26. It then diverges again at Jeypore to pass through Boipariguda before entering Malkangiri district near Mathili.

Koraput railway station is a junction station on Kirandul-Visakhapatnam railway line that branches towards Rayagada railway station on the other side. Other main railheads include Jeypore, Kotpad Road Station, Damanjodi, and Lakshmipur Road.

Jeypore Airport has direct, daily flight connections to Bhubaneswar and Vishakhapatnam.

== Politics ==
=== Vidhan sabha constituencies ===
The following are the 5 Vidhan sabha constituencies of Koraput district and the elected members of that area and are Assembly segments which constitute the Koraput Parliament Constituency. The current representative to Lok Sabha is Saptagiri Sankar Ulaka.

| No. | Constituency | Reserved | Extent of the Assembly Constituency (Blocks) | MLA | Party |
|---|---|---|---|---|---|
| 141 | Lakshmipur | ST | Lakshmipur, Dasamanthapur, Bandhugaon, Narayanpatana | Pabitra Saunta | INC |
| 142 | Kotpad | ST | Kotpad (NAC), Kotpad, Kundra, Borigumma (part), Boipariguda (part) | Rupu Bhatra | BJP |
| 143 | Jeypore | None | Jeypore (M), Jeypore, Borigumma (part) | Tara Prasad Bahinipati | INC |
| 144 | Koraput | SC | Koraput (M), Sunabeda (M), Lamtaput, Koraput (part), Boipariguda (part) | Raghu Ram Machha | BJP |
| 145 | Pottangi | ST | Pottangi, Semiliguda, Nandapur, Koraput (part) | Ram Chandra Kadam | INC |

=== Local Bodies ===
In accordance with the three tier system of Panchayati Raj, the district comprises one Zila Parishad of 29 constituencies (or Zones) further subdivided is divided into 240 Gram Panchayats in 14 Panchayat Samitis. The President, Zila Parishad heads the body while the Collector and CDO function as its CEO and EO respectively. Each Panchayat Samiti is headed by a Chairman with the BDO as the CEO while the Panchayat is headed by a Sarpanch with an executive officer. Like the Zila Parishad, the other two bodies also have constituencies like PS Zones or Wards respectively. Each of these bodies has access to annual grants from the Finance Commission and are responsible for approving their own budgets in general body meetings.

== Geographical indication ==
Koraput Kalajeera rice was awarded the Geographical Indication (GI) status tag from the Geographical Indications Registry under the Union Government of India on 02/01/2024 (valid until 10/01/2032).

Jaivik Sri Farmers Producer Company Limited from Pujariput, proposed the GI registration of Koraput Kalajeera rice. After filing the application in January 2022, the rice was granted the GI tag in 2024 by the Geographical Indication Registry in Chennai, making the name "Koraput Kalajeera rice" exclusive to the rice grown in the region. It thus became the first rice variety from Odisha and the 25th type of goods from Odisha to earn the GI tag.

The GI tag protects the rice from illegal selling and marketing, and gives it legal protection and a unique identity.

== Bibliography ==
Berger, Peter (2002). The Gadaba and the 'non-ST' Desia of Koraput, Orissa. Article

Burrow, T. and S. Bhattacharya (1961). Some notes on the Kui dialect as spoken by the Kuttia Kandhas of North-east Koraput. Indo-Iranian Journal. 5 (2): 118-135

Franco, Merlin F. and D. Narasimhan (2012). Ethnobotany of Kondh, Poraja, Gadaba and Bonda of the Koraput region of Orissa, India. D.K. Printworld. ISBN 978-81-246-0619-3

Franco, Merlin F and D. Narasimhan (2009). Plant names and uses as indicators of knowledge patterns. Indian Journal of Traditional Knowledge. 8: 645-648 Article

Franco, Merlin F., D. Narasimhan and W. Stanley (2009). Relationship between Four Tribal Communities and their Natural Resources in the Koraput Region. Ethnobotany Research & Applications 6: 481-485

Franco, Merlin F and D. Narasimhan (2008). Ecological elements in the songs of the Poraja and the ancient Tamils. Indian Journal of Eco-criticism 1, 49-54

Thusu, Kidar Nath and Jha, Makhan (1972). Ollar Gadba of Koraput. Anthropological Survey of India, Kolkata

Thusu, Kidar Nath (1977). Pengo Parajas of Koraput. Anthropological Survey of India, Kolkata
