= Kotia =

Kotia may refer to:

- Kotia, Koraput, a village in Koraput district of Odisha
- Kottia, a town in Burkina Faso
- Kotia (tribe), a Scheduled Tribe of India
- Kotia, Haryana, a village in Mahendragarh district, Haryana, India
- Kutia, a ceremonial grain dish served by Eastern Orthodox Christians
- Cotia, a municipality in the state of São Paulo in Brazil.

== See also ==
- Kotiya (disambiguation)
