= Kolab (disambiguation) =

Kolab is a free and open source groupware suite.

It may also refer to:

== Places ==
- Kolab Dam, a gravity dam situated near Jeypore town in Koraput district of Odisha, India
- Kolab Jial, a town and Union council of Kingri Taluka, Sindh, Pakistan
- Kolab River, one of the major rivers of Odisha, India

== Others ==
- Kolab Now, a web-based email and groupware service, based completely on free and open-source software
- Kolab Pailin, a Khmer novel that was written by Nhok Them in B.E 2504
