= Mazhar Abro =

Pakistani short story writer, novelist, playwright and poet

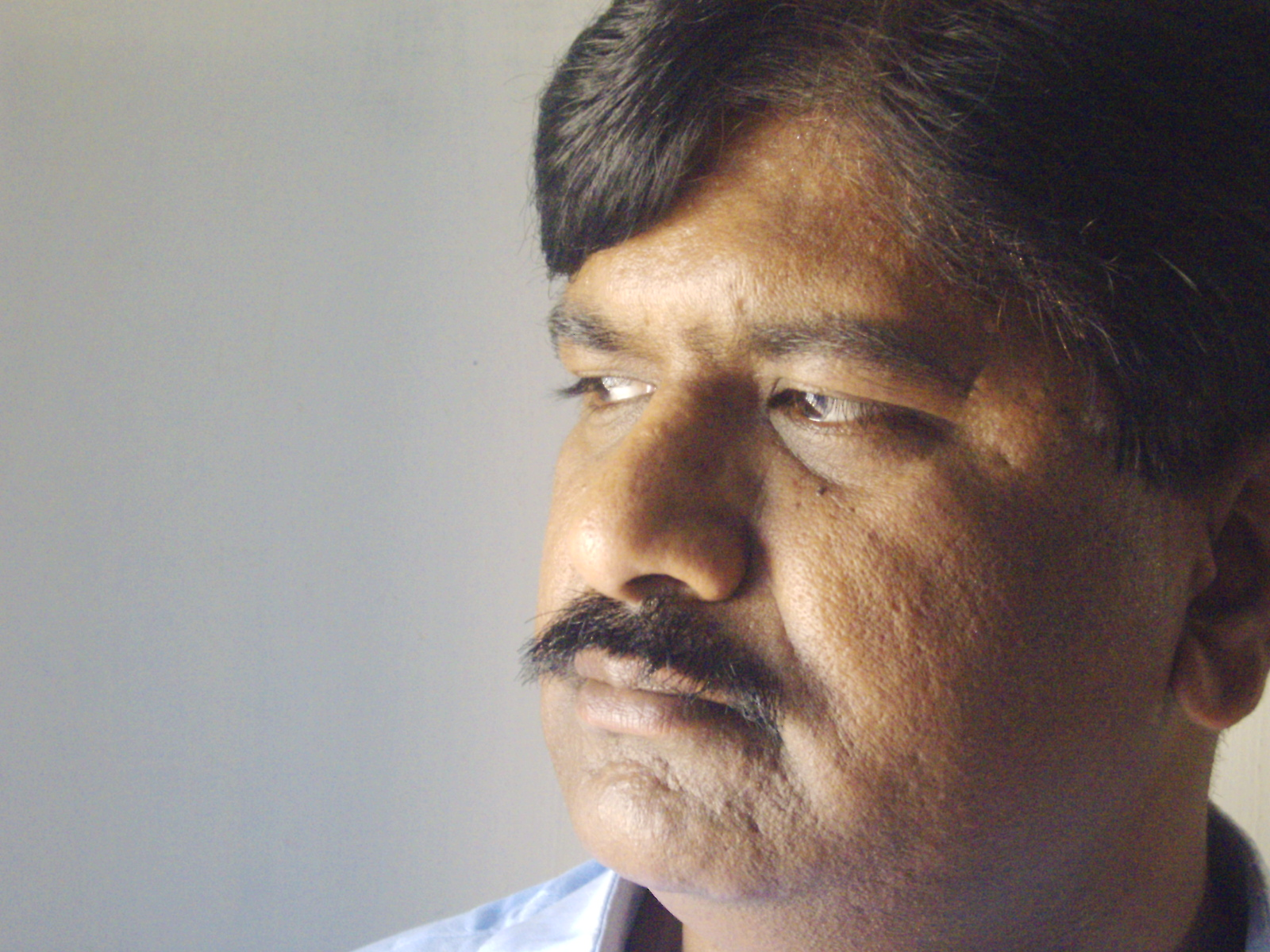
- Mazhar Abro
- Born: Mazhar Hussain Abro; April 25, 1971 (age 55); Kolab Jial, Khairpur District, Sindh, Pakistan
- Education: Masters in Sindhi Literature, Masters in Economics
- Writing career
- Period: 1993–present
- Genres: Fiction and poetry
- Literary movement: Progressive Movement

Mazhar Abro (Sindhi: مظھر ابڙو) is a prominent short story writer, novelist, playwright and poet from Sindh, Pakistan. His literary appreciation began with the "Shah Abdul Lateef Bhittai National Award" by Pakistan Academy of letters Islamabad.

== Early life ==
Mazhar Abro was born as Mazhar Hussain Abro. He was born to Manzoor Hussain Abro on 25 April 1971 in village Kolab Jial of Khairpur District, Sindh, Pakistan.

Abro completed his early education at his village Kolab Jial, Khairpur and then his secondary education at Comprehensive High School, Khairpur. He affiliated himself with Pakistan Degree College, Khairpur for Graduation, and obtained a master's degree in Sindhi literature and economics from Shah Abdul Latif University Khairpur.

== Contribution ==
Mazhr Abro has authored seven books, one poetry collection, 4 books of Short stories and 2 Novels. By profession he is a professor of the College Education Department, Government of Sindh. He has granted many awards, including the National award from Pakistan Academy of Letters Islamabad.

== Awards ==
In 1997, Abro won the Pakistan Academy of Letters Shah Abdul Latif Bhitai Award for best book in Sindhi literature for Khawab Khota Sika. Abro was honored on March 19, 2005.

== Publications ==
=== Novels ===
- Jeevan Ujar Rasta (2000, Venggas Publication Khairpur)
- Khuwaban jo Safar (2009, Venggas Publication Khairpur)

=== Short stories ===
- Dharti Tay Wikhrial Tanda (1993, Preet Publication Khairpur)
- Khuwab Khota Sika (1998, Venggas Publication Khairpur)
- Sard Khanay Mein Rakhial Khuwab (2000, Venggas Publication Khairpur)
- Sukal Nadi ja Nishan (2020, Naun Niyapo Publication Karachi)

=== Poetry ===
- Dard Jay Aas Pas (2002, Venggas Publication Khairpur)
