= Bodo Parja language =

Indo-Aryan language spoken in India

Bodo Parja
- Jharia
- ବଡ଼ ପରଜା
- Native to: India
- Region: Koraput, Odisha
- Ethnicity: Paraja Tribe
- Native speakers: 156,354 (2011 census)
- Language family: Indo-European: Indo-Iranian; Indo-Aryan; Eastern; Oriya; Bodo Parja
- Writing system: Odia script

Language codes
- ISO 639-3: bdv
- Glottolog: bodo1266

Bodo Parja or Jharia is a Indo-Aryan language spoken by the Parang Proja tribe of southern Odisha. Most speakers have low proficiency in it, while Desia language is used at market.
