= Boipariguda =

Boipariguda is a block under Koraput district of Odisha. It is situated 22km away from Jeypore. There are 20 gram panchayat and 26 villages under Boipariguda block.

== Geography ==
Boipariguda is located at 18.7511° N, 82.4333° E

== Demographics ==
Population of Boipariguda is approx 4000.

== Administration ==
Boipariguda is one of the most remote blocks in India. The main population of Boiparigua consist of schedule cast and schedule tribes. Boipariguda falls under Jeypore vidhan sabha constituency. The current MLA for Jeypore vidhan sabha constituency is Shri Tara Prasad Bahinipati of INC.

Boipariguda falls under Koraput lok sabha constituency. Saptagiri Sankar Ulaka from INC is the current MP for Koraput lok sabha constituency.

== Business and economy ==
The main source of income for people of Boipariguda is farming. They depend on monsoon rain to sow rice paddy. Apart from this the tribal are known for animal farming activities.

== Transportation ==
Travelling to Boipariguda is easy from Jeypore. You can get frequent public services running from Jeypore to Boipariguda.
