= Kundura =

Kundura or Kundra is an administrative block in Jeypore subdivision in Koraput district in the Indian state of Odisha.
