= Kotiya =

Kotiya may refer to:

- Sri Lankan leopard
- Ghanjah, or kotiya, a type of sailing vessel
- One of the exogamous clans of the Nat (Muslim) community of the Indian Subcontinent

== See also ==
- Kotia (disambiguation)
