= Duduma Waterfalls =

Falls between Odisha and Andhra Pradesh in India

Duduma Waterfall
- Location within Odisha
- Location: Koraput District, Odisha, India
- Coordinates: 18°31′6.68″N 82°27′12.83″E
- Type: Horsetail
- Total height: 157 m (515 ft)
- Number of drops: 1

Duduma Waterfall is situated in the border of Koraput (Odisha) districts of India.

== Geography ==
This horsetail type waterfall is 175 metres (574 ft) in height and is formed by the Machkund river. It has two sub-waterfalls, one on the Odisha side and the other on the Andhra Pradesh side. Duduma is about 92 km from Koraput and about 177 km from Visakhapatnam.

== Hydroelectric project ==
Machhakund (Duduma) Hydroelectric Project is located near Duduma Falls. A collaboration between the Andhra Pradesh and Odisha governments, the project, consisting of 6 units, has an installed capacity of 120 MW.

== Tourism ==
Machkund is a pilgrimage destination. The aboriginal tribe of Bonda, Gadaba, and Paraja live near this waterfall.

== Gallery ==
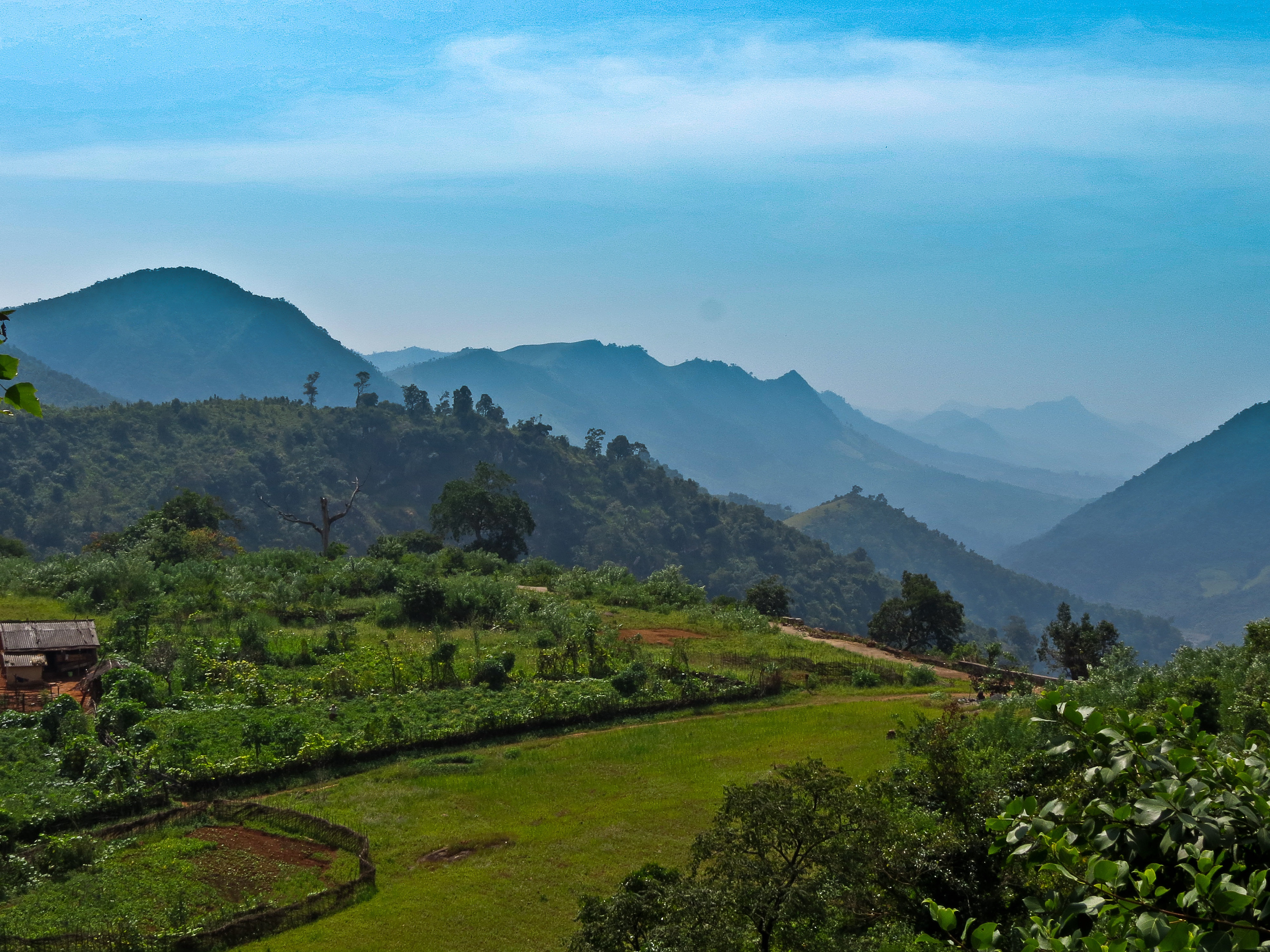

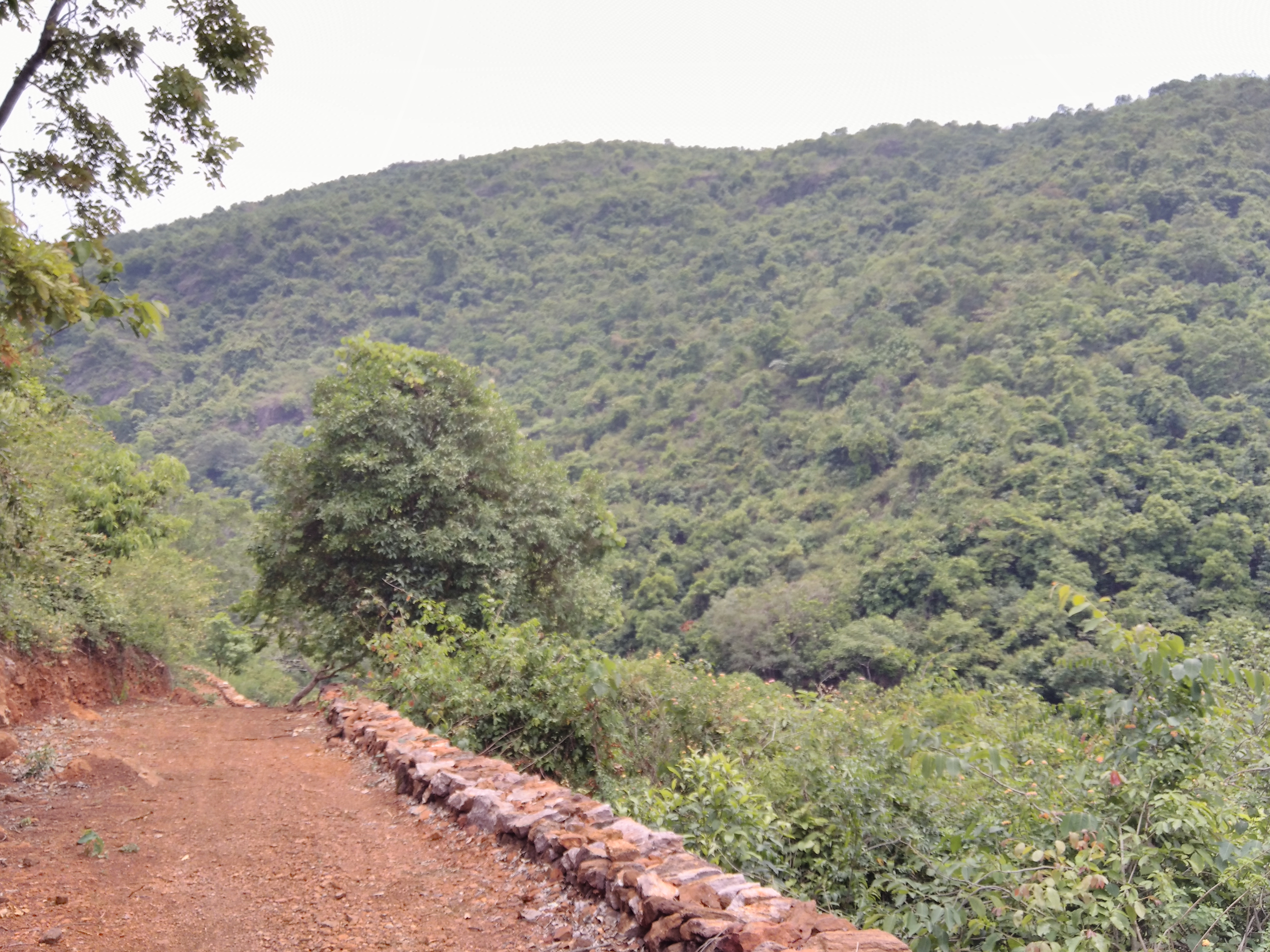

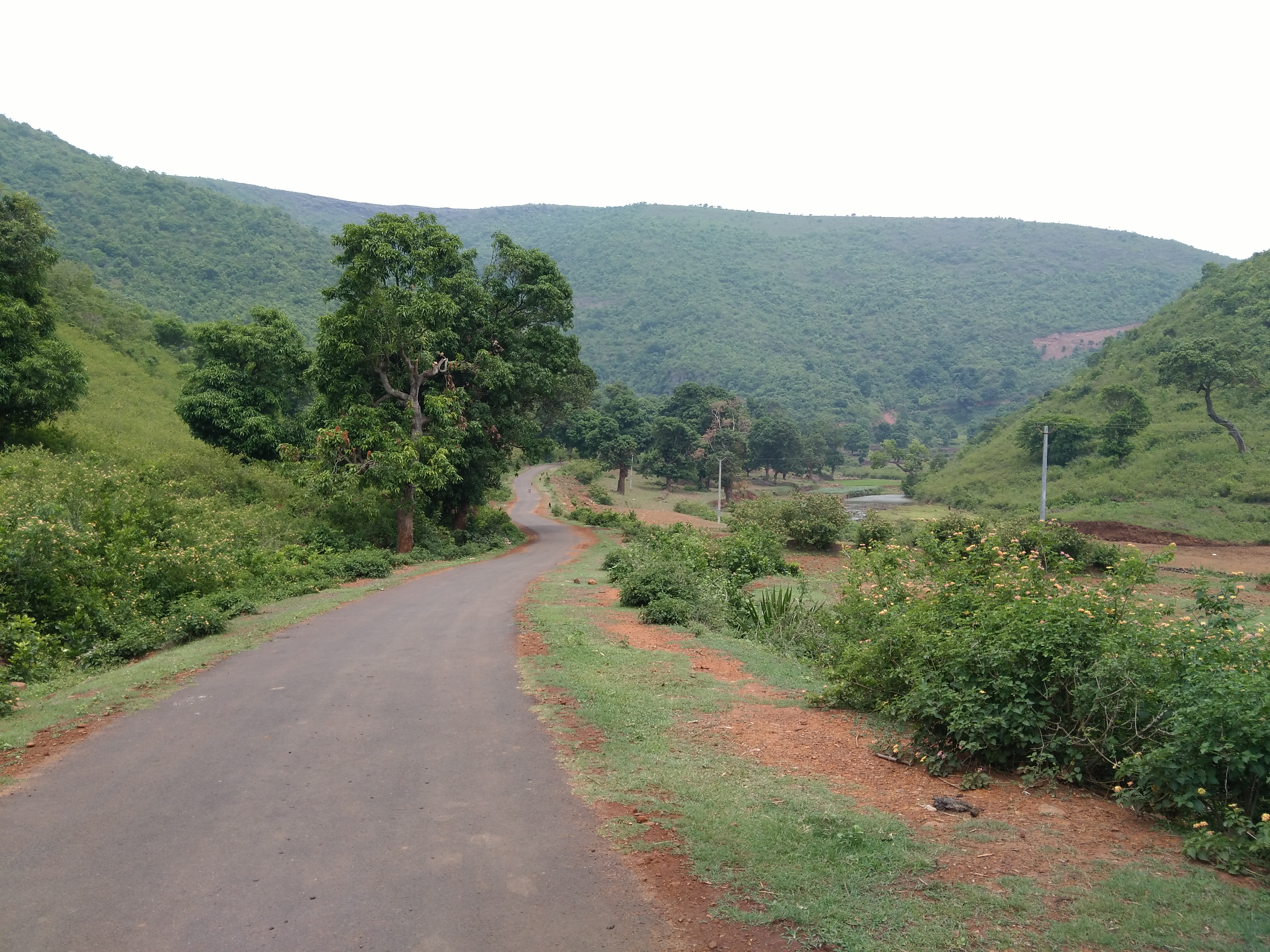

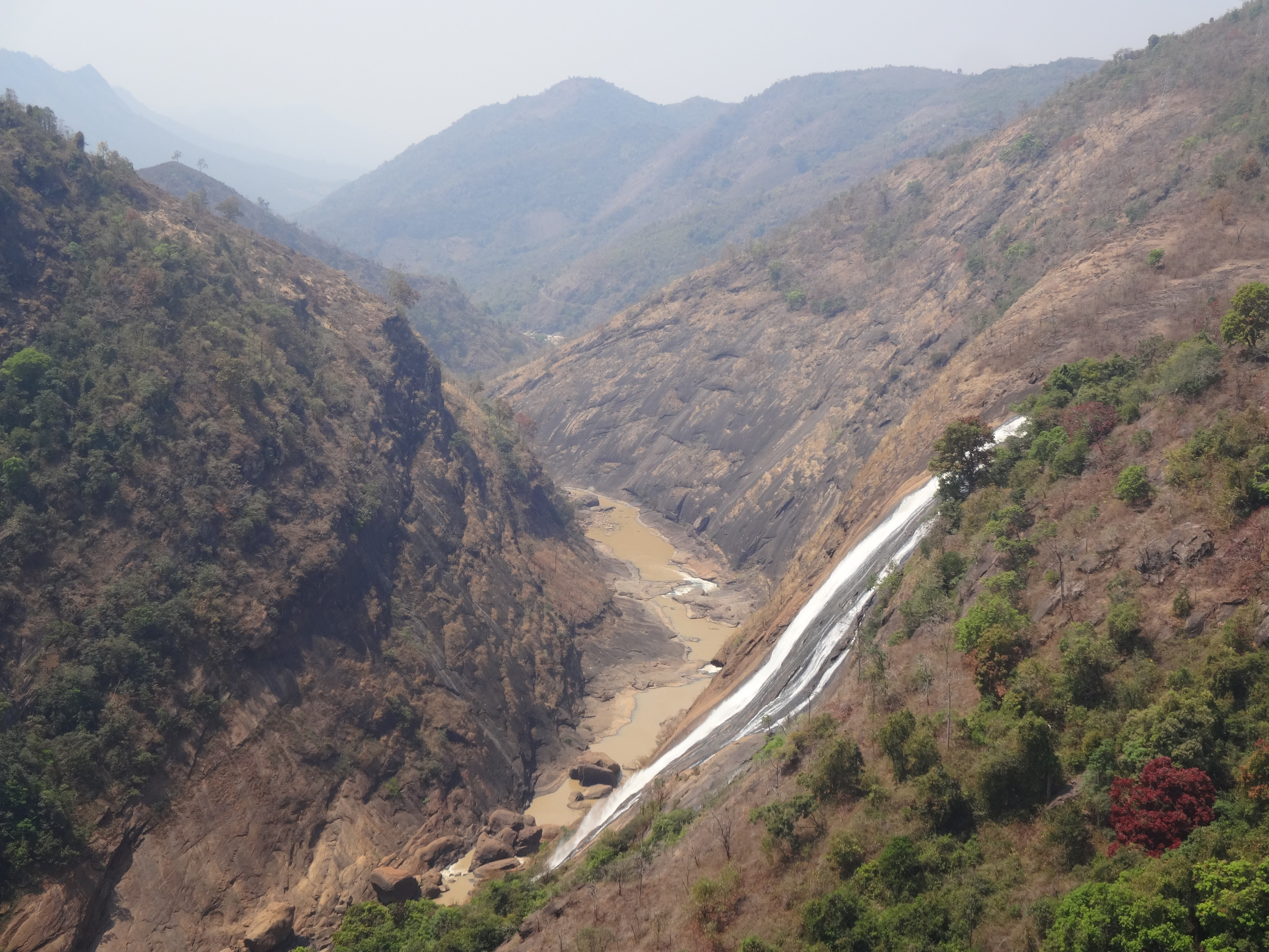

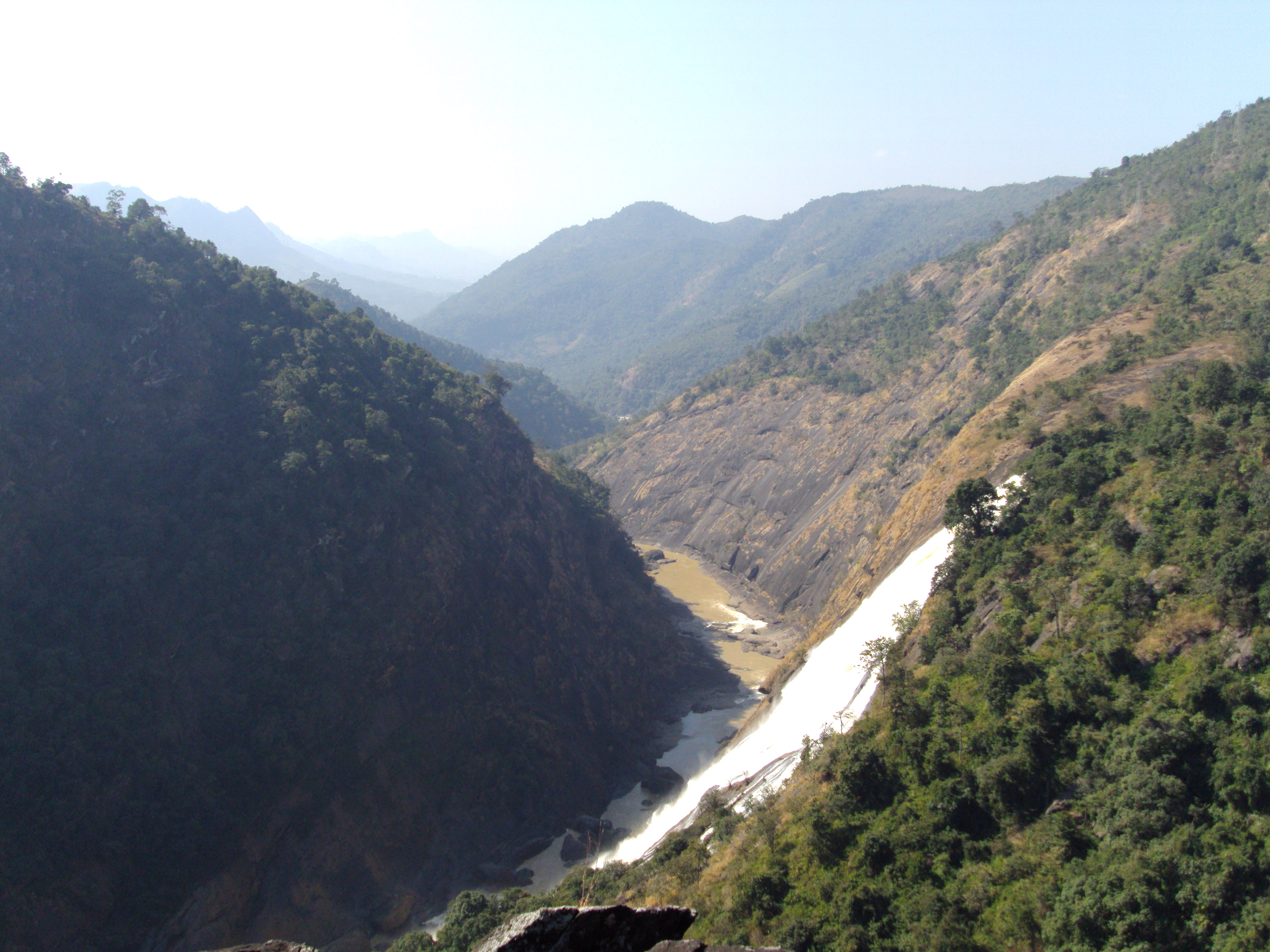

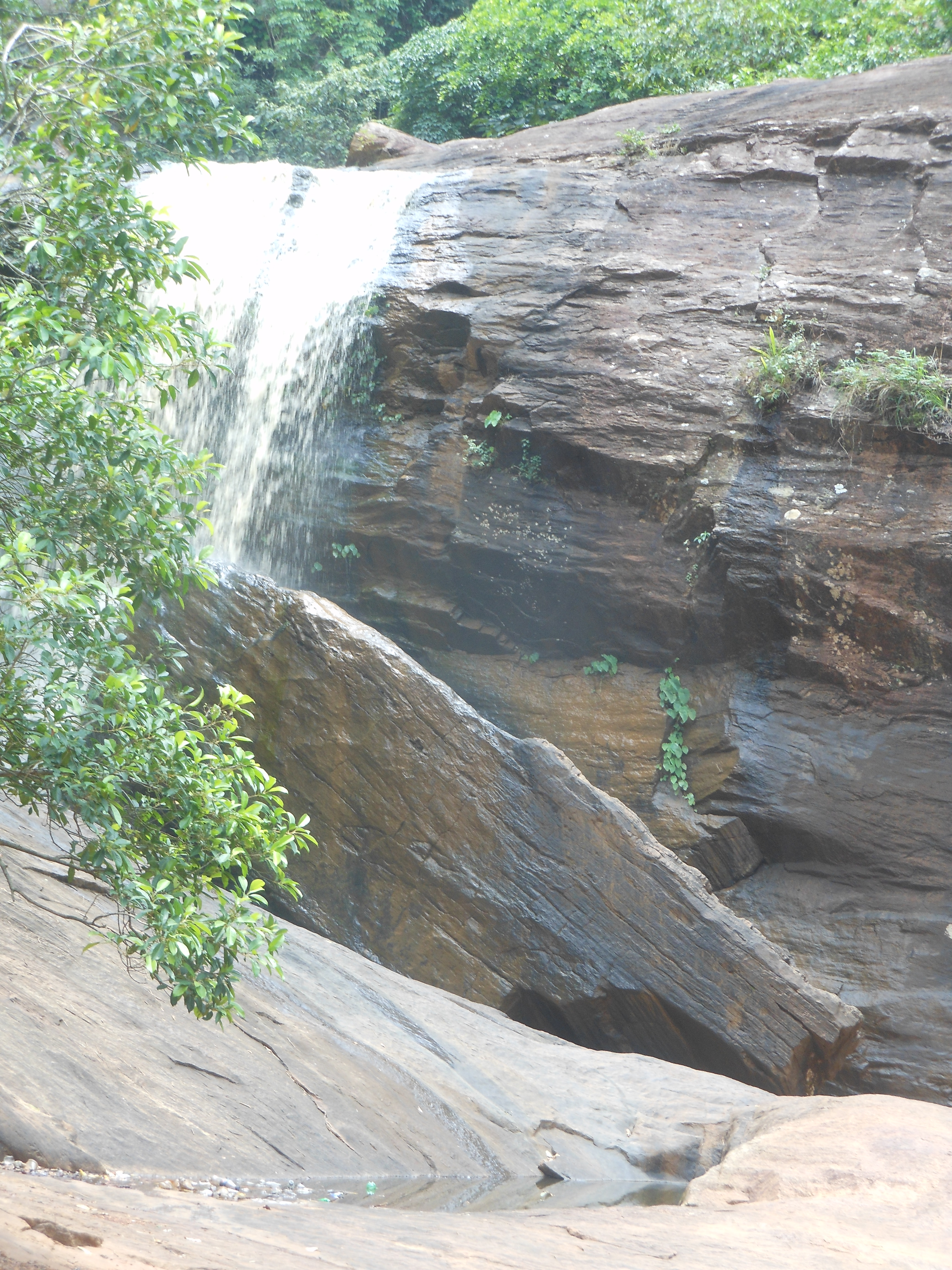

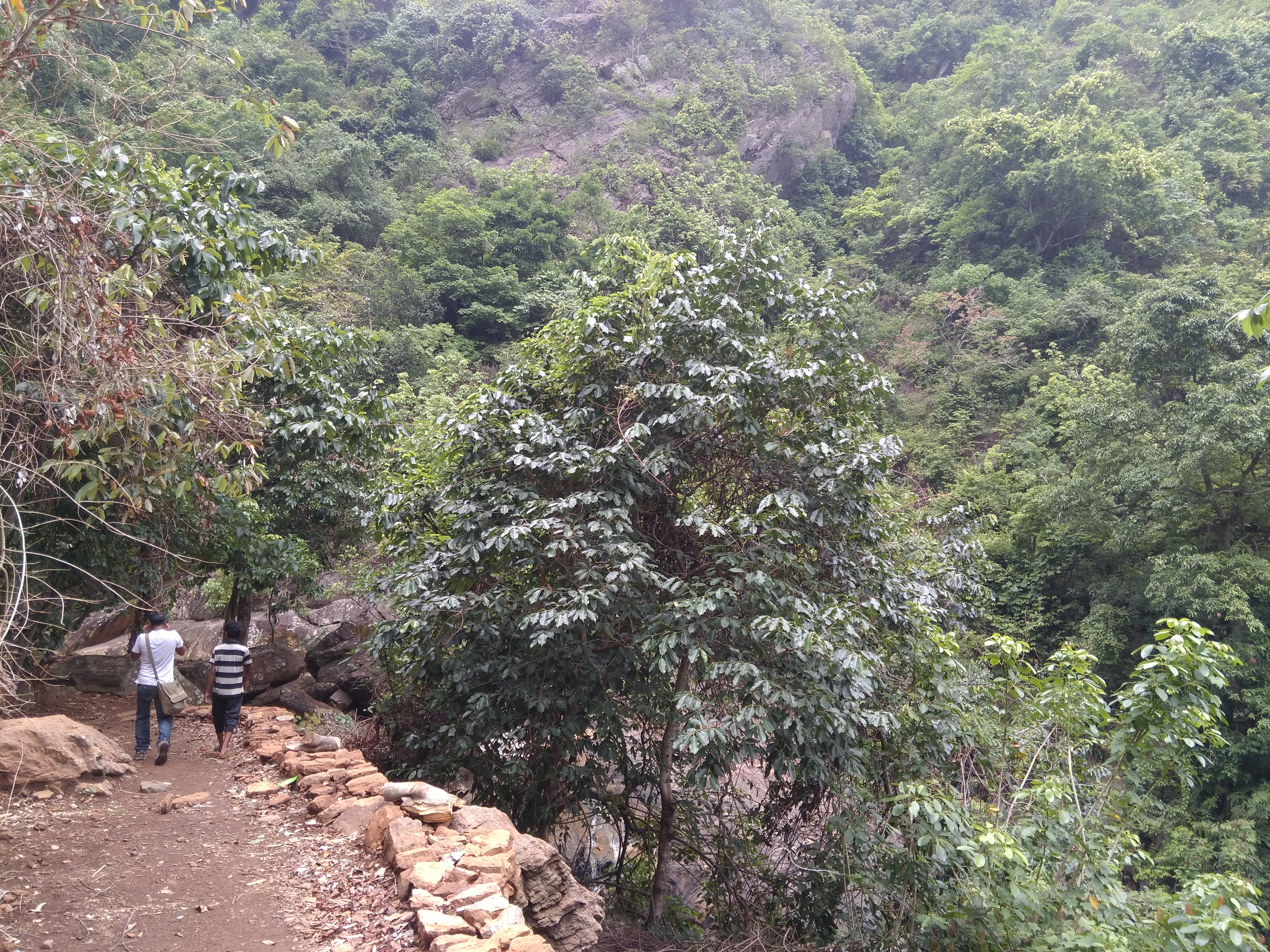

== See also ==
- List of waterfalls
- List of waterfalls in India
- List of waterfalls in India by height
