= Bhatri language =

Eastern Indo-Aryan language of India

Bhatri
- भतरी, ଭତ୍ରି
- Native to: India
- Region: Chhattisgarh, Odisha
- Ethnicity: Bhottadas
- Native speakers: 334,258 (2011 census)
- Language family: Indo-European: Indo-Iranian; Indo-Aryan; Eastern; Odia; Bhatri
- Writing system: Devanagari, Odia

Language codes
- ISO 639-3: bgw
- Glottolog: bhat1265

Bhatri is an Eastern Indo-Aryan language spoken by the Bhottada tribe in Chhattisgarh and Odisha, India. The language is spoken predominantly in eastern Bastar district and in Koraput and Nabarangpur districts of Odisha.
