= Subai Jain temples =

Group of Jain Temples

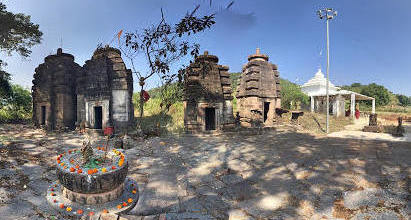
- Subai Jain temple complex

Religion
- Affiliation: Jainism
- Deity: Rishabhanatha
- Festival: Mahavir Jayanti

Location
- Location: Subai village, Koraput, Odisha
- Interactive map of Subai Jain temples
- Coordinates: 18°36′23″N 82°47′58″E

Architecture
- Established: 4th century
- Temple: 6

Subai Jain temples is a group of Jain temple in Subai village of Koraput district, Odisha.

== History ==
Subai Jain temple complex is a group of five Jain temples built in 4th century. Subai was an important Jain center and the Jain temple were constructed by Jain gemstone traders who came to Koraput region for trading. The temples are dedicated to Mahavira, Parshvanatha, Rishabhanatha and others to Tirthankaras.

The Government of Odisha describes the archaeological remains at Subai as those of a Jain monastery of the medieval period. The same government publication states that researchers have suggested that the monument may have been constructed before 750 CE.

== About temple ==
The temple were initially built with triratha architecture with amalaka. The door jabs has carvings of rosette enclosed with dotted squares. One temple is famous for its rare images of the tirthankaras. The temple houses an image of Rishabhanatha in padmasan dhyāna posture; surrounded by tirthankaras. An idol of a four-armed Tara (a Jain yakshi) adorned by bangles in the temple complex is also noteworthy. Images identified as Mahavira, Chakreshvari and Rohini are also preserved at the site. The images are carved on stone slabs, with the identifying symbols of the figures represented beneath their thrones. Several of the sculptures have become weathered and have lost some of their finer features through prolonged exposure.

The temples continue to have a religious function, and the Government of Odisha records that members of the local Goudo community worship at the site. A Parab festival is organised by the temple management every year. A 4 feet (1.2 m) Jain idol was discovered in 2020 during excavation.

== See also ==
- Udayagiri and Khandagiri Caves
