= Damanjodi =

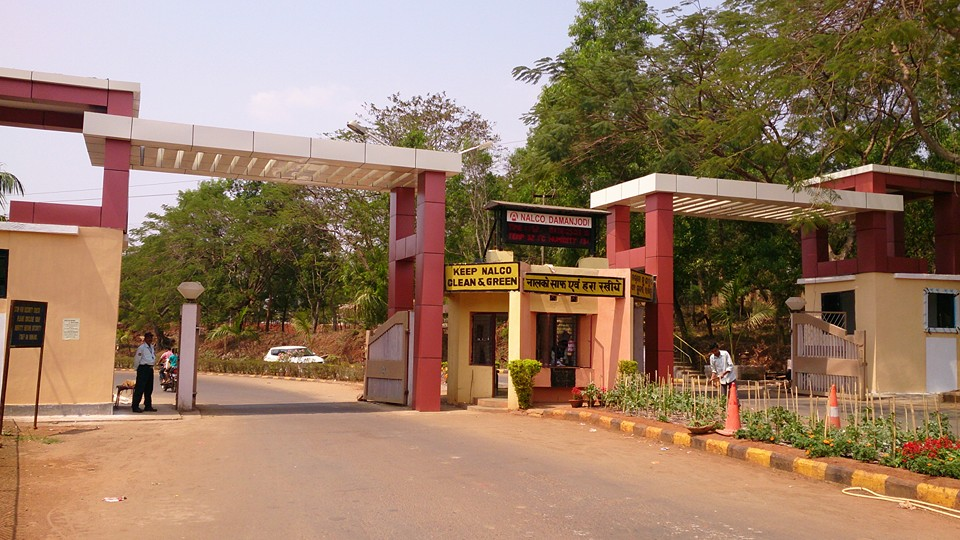
- Industrial Town Damanjodi

- Location in Odisha, India Damanjodi (India)
- Coordinates: 18.82°N 82.72°E
- Country: India
- State: Odisha
- District: Koraput

Population (2001)
  - Total: 8,469

Languages
  - Official: Odia
- Time zone: UTC+5:30 (IST)
- Postal code: 763008
- Vehicle registration: OD 10
- Website: odisha.gov.in

Damanjodi is a town located in the Koraput district of Odisha, India. As of 2001 census, its population was 8,469. The town was founded as a residential area for employees of the National Aluminium Company (NALCO), a company that was established to harness the bauxite-rich deposits of the Panchpatmali Range. Damanjodi contains the NALCO Township, a residential area for NALCO employees, Mathalput, a semi-urban neighborhood with shops, and Bhejaput, a shopping complex. The population is considered cosmopolitan in nature with employees from all over India and locals from the tribal region.

== Geography ==
Damanjodi is located on the foothills of the Panchapatmali mountain range. The soil is rich with bauxite and has a reddish appearance. The topography is mountainous, and the river Kerandi runs nearby, serving as a source of clean water.

The local agrarian community produces rice, millets, vegetables, and mustard.

== NALCO Township ==
The NALCO township is composed of three sectors of housing quarters for the employees of the firm. Facilities include a water supply and treatment plant, NALCO's captive power plant, a hospital, banks with networked ATMs, three large co-operative stores, two market complexes, clubs, community centers, temples, a church, and a mosque. The firm also has some housing in different locations around the township for employees displaced from the main complex. The township also has stadiums, parks, avenues, walking tracks, gardens, plantations, and waterfalls.

== Demographics ==
According to the 2001 Indian census, Damanjodi has a population of 8,469. Males constitute 54% of the population and females 46%. The average literacy rate was 83%, higher than the national average of 59.5%. Male literacy was 85% and female literacy was 81%. 14% of the population was under 6 years of age.

== Places of worship ==
Damanjodi has a cosmopolitan culture and acknowledges several major religions. Places of religious importance include a number of temples, a church and a mosque.

Shree Jagannath temple

The Shree Jagannath Temple is a major Hindu temple complex. It includes the Mausi Maa Temple, which serves as the center of attention during the annual Ratha-Yatra festival. All major annual festivals and occasions are celebrated in the temple in association with the Shree Jagannath temple at Puri.

Maa Kantabausini temple

Located near one of the main entrance gates of the township, the Maa Kantabausini Temple is a local tourist destination. The presiding deity of Damanjodi Maa Kantabaunsini dwells in the natural sacred grove of bamboo trees.

Shree Shiridi Sai Baba temple

The town's newest temple complex comprises the Dwarka Mayi and Shiridi temples. It hosts all major festivals and rituals in association with the Sai Baba of Shirdi temple.

Shree Hanuman temple

The Shree Hanuman temple complex contains a 108 ft tall statue of Lord Hanuman, which can be seen from any part of the town, as well as a temple with an ashtadhatu idol of Hanuman.

Shree Satya Sai Baba temple

This temple is located in the foothills near Sabari Lake.

Union church

Union church is situated on a small hill near the Ambedkar Stadium and serves the Christian community, .

Damanjodi mosque

The Damanjodi mosque is an example of Muslim style and architecture. It hosts a large gathering during the month of Ramadan for the Muslim Community.

== Parks and recreation areas ==
Sabari lake

This artificial lake was originally created by NALCO for water disposal and has become a park including walkways, gardens and sculptures and an artificial waterfall, Sudarshan Jhara. It is popular for picnics in winter.

Biju Patnaik park

One of the oldest parks in the town, Biju Patnaik park is close to Sabari lake. It has a statue of Odisha politician Biju Patnaik near its entrance. The park contains a children's play area and an area dedicated to science.

Nehru Sishu Udyan park

A park mainly dedicated to children.

Saraswati Sishu Udyan park

Located in Saraswati Vihar, this park serves as a central area for children to play.

The NALCO club

This club contains a canteen, swimming pool, badminton court, tennis court, skating ground, indoor games section (table tennis, carom, chess, billiards), gymnasium and library.

NALCO Community Center

A major place of public gathering in the town, the complex hosts all the major trade fairs around the year as well as providing a venue for celebrations, competitions and other events.

Dr. B.R. Ambedkar Stadium

This stadium hosts all the major sporting events as well as the annual Ravan Podi festival, the largest annual gathering in the town.

Pendal amphitheatre

The town's amphitheater is the focus of the annual Panchpatmali Natya Mahotsav theatre festival.

== Education ==
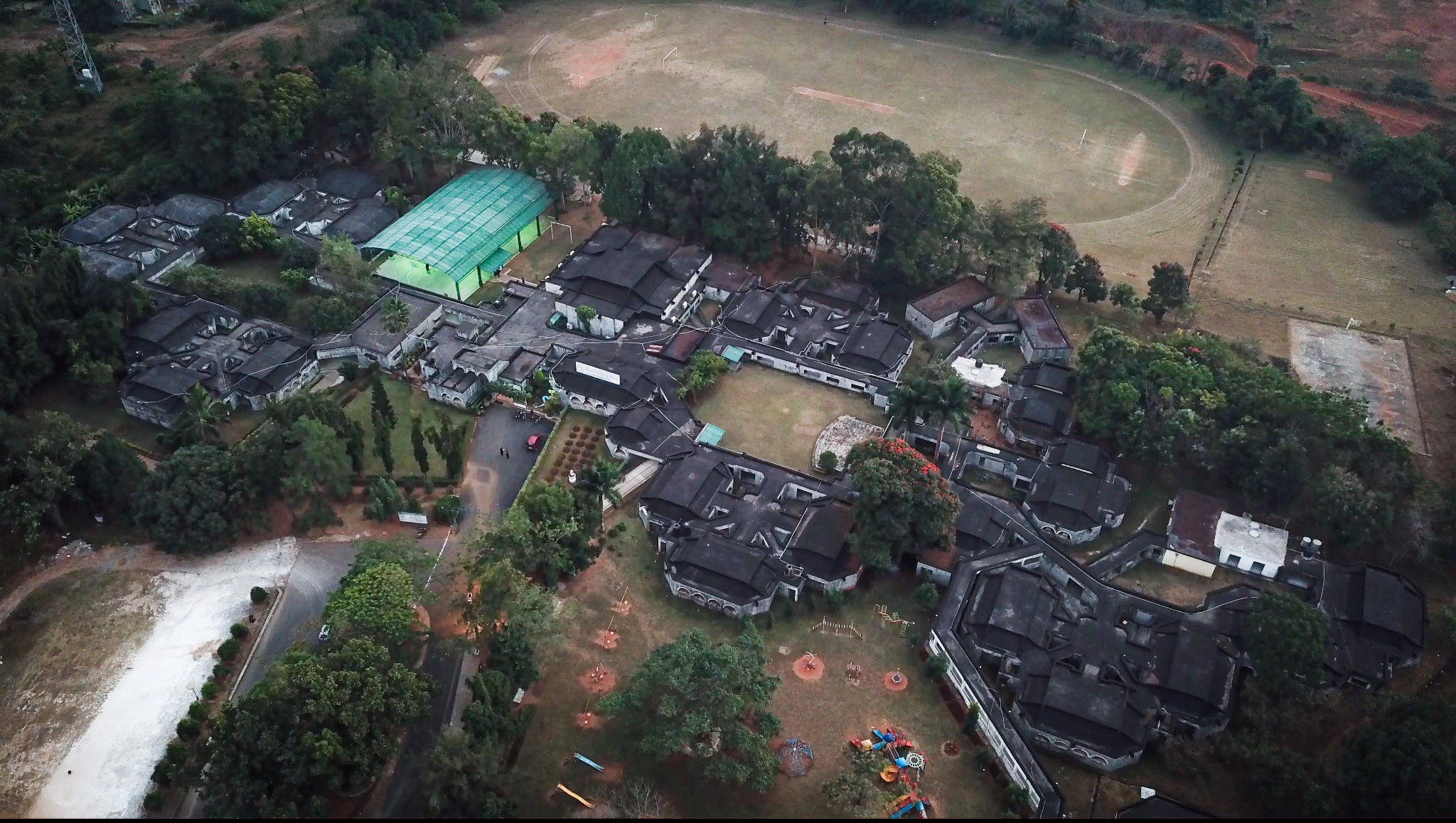
Aerial view of DPS Damanjodi

The Saraswati Vidya Mandir school and Delhi Public School are the two main schools within the township. Both institutions were set up with the help of NALCO and provide students with state-of-the-art education amenities.

In addition, the Sri Aurobindo Study Circle, Alumina Girls High School, and Malushanta High School are located outside the township.

== Healthcare ==
NALCO supports a hospital complex within the town for company employees, including an occupational health centre and a pharmacy. The Government Health facility is located near Mathalput serves as the main hospital for locals who are not employed by NALCO.

== Transportation ==
- Roads: National Highway 26 (Visakhapatnam-Raipur) is 9 km away from Damanjodi and connected through a service road. The District Headquarters, Koraput, is 36 km away and Jeypore is 52 km. Semilguda and Sunabeda are 9 km and 11 km away respectively. There is government and private run bus service connecting Damanjodi to all major local towns, including Visakhapatnam, Vizianagram, Bhubaneswar, Cuttack, Puri, Balasore, Bhadrak, Kendrapada, Rourkela, Brahmapur, Jagdalpur, Durg, Raipur, Bhilai, Bolangir, Sambalpur, Baragarh, Bhawanipatna, and Anugul. Private cab and shared taxi services are also available from Damanjodi to all major locations across Odisha and nearby cities like Visakhapatanam, Vizianagram, Bhubaneswar, Jagdalpur and Raipur.
- Rail: The Koraput-Rayagada rail link passes through the Damanjodi railway station, connecting the town to the East Coast Railway Division. There are rail connections to Rayagada, Visakhapatnam, Bhubaneswar, Behrampur, Sambalpur, Jharsuguda, Rourkela, Jeypore, Koraput, Raipur, Howrah, and Jagdalpur.
- Air: Jeypore airport is the nearest airport located about 54km away.

Visakhapatnam is the major domestic and International Airport located about 200 km away.
