= Kottia =

- Location in Burkina Faso
- Coordinates: 12°57′N 0°1′W
- Country: Burkina Faso
- Region: Est Region
- Province: Gnagna Province
- Department: Bogandé Department

Population (2019)
  - Total: 1,777

Kottia is a town in the Bogandé Department of Gnagna Province in eastern Burkina Faso.

Population
Year	Pop.	±%
1985	1,291	—
2006	1,424	+10.3%
2019	1,777	+24.8%
