= Kotia (disputed territory) =

Disputed village

- Village
- Interactive map of Kotia
- Coordinates: 18°51′55″N 83°06′16″E
- Country: India
- State: Odisha
- District: Koraput

Government
  - Type: Gram Panchayat
  - Member of Legislative Assembly: Pitam Padhi
- Elevation: 1,024 m (3,360 ft)

Population (2011)
  - Total: 797

Languages
  - Official: Odia
- Time zone: UTC+5:30 (IST)
- Telephone code: 06854
- Vehicle registration: OD - 10

Kotia is a village and the headquarters of Kotia grama panchayat, Koraput. Along with other villages of the Grama Panchayat, it is the subject of a long pending border dispute between the states of Andhra Pradesh and Odisha, which claim it as a part of Salur mandal in Parvathipuram Manyam district and as a part of Pottangi block in Koraput district respectively.

== History ==
The area under dispute forms a part of the Pottangi Tahsil under the Koraput District of the State of Odisha. The Gram Panchayat headquarters are at Kotia, and it comprises 28 villages, 21 of which form the subject of the dispute.

Both the Koraput and Parvathipuram Districts of Odisha and Andhra Pradesh formed a part of the undivided Vizagapatam District of Madras before 1936. The district had two divisions – a Settled portion along the coast and an Agency area that covered the rest of it. The latter was mostly un-surveyed and largely formed a part of the Zamindari estate of Jeypore, now a part of Odisha. The usual laws did not apply to this tract, and the Collector and District Magistrate administered the same under the Ganjam and Vizagapatam Act of 1839 in a personal capacity. Importantly, as the area was a private Zamindari, it was never surveyed in detail or its borders established. While many Talukas of the district fell within one or the other category, there were some – like Salur - that had both these divisions within their boundaries.

Before 1920, the disputed area was a part of the Salur Agency within the Taluka of the same name. In that year, the British Parliament through an Act carved out a new Agency district and, inter alia, abolished the Salur Agency. All of its 123 villages were transferred to the neighbouring Agency of the Pottangi Taluka (now a part of Odisha). This new district was abolished barely three years later by the Government, but the reorganisation of the Talukas was not interfered with. In 1927, the Government of Madras purportedly transferred 115 of these villages back to Salur and re-created a Salur Agency. After subsequent corrections in 1928, it was found that only 7 villages out of the 21 disputed villages formed a part of this re-transfer, while the other 14 continued as a part of the Pottangi Agency and Taluka.

== Administrative Background ==
These 7 villages along with seven others were initially a part of the Pachipenta Zamindari from which they had been purchased by the Maharaja of Jeypore in 1909. After the Government of India (Constitution of Orissa) Order, 1936, Vizagapatam District was divided and almost all of its Agency areas were incorporated into a new Koraput District. This district became a constituent of the new province of Orissa. The Act defined the borders of Orissa as ‘(all of) Jeypore Impartible Estate…and…as much of Pottangi Taluk as is not included in the Estate’. This was further elaborated upon in the 1st Schedule of the Constitution of India, 1950 which stated that Orissa comprises ‘(all areas) …that were immediately before the commencement of this Constitution…being administered as if they formed part of that Province’.

Post 1936, the Government of Odisha has continued administering all these 21 villages. General elections have been conducted here since 1952. The last elections in 2019 saw six booths in Kotia GP area and a turnout of approximately 63%. Similarly, elections to three tier Panchayat system have been regularly carried out as per schedule with elected Sarpanchs and Ward Members in place. There is also a Police Station, Health and Wellness Centre, Residential quarters for the staff, Anganwadis in each village, one Ashram School, primary schools and hostels throughout the so-called Disputed Area. Roads connect each and every village to Kotia and other parts of Pottangi Block. All residents hold FRA pattas, Aadhar cards and Voter IDs of Odisha State.

== Litigation ==
After the creation of an Andhra Province in 1953, the new state also advanced claims on Kotia. The issue was discussed between the two Chief Ministers in 1968 in the presence of the Union Home Minister, but as no solution could be found, the State of Orissa approached the Supreme Court under Article 131. The Court granted a stay on all further constructions or development in the area while the matter was sub-judice. In 2006, the Supreme Court observed that the dispute was best resolved by the Union Parliament as the subject matter came within the proviso clause of Article 131 which excludes pre-Constitution treaty, agreements or similar instruments. The court did note that counsels for both the states had given an undertaking to respect the status quo and the same was therefore recorded.
