= Koraput Kalajeera rice =

Type of non-Basmati aromatic rice

Koraput Kalajeera rice (କୋରାପୁଟର କଳାଜିରା ଧାନ)
- Geographical indication
- Description: Koraput Kalajeera rice is an aromatic rice cultivated in Odisha
- Type: Aromatic rice
- Area: Koraput district
- Country: India
- Registered: 2 January 2024
- Official website: ipindia.gov.in

Koraput Kalajeera rice is a variety of non-Basmati, aromatic, black paddy coloured, small rice mainly grown in the Indian state of Odisha. It is a common and widely cultivated crop in the Koraput district of Odisha as well as Nabarangapur district which was earlier a part of Koraput. For thousands of years, the ancestors of Koraput's present tribal communities have cultivated and domesticated Kalajeera rice, playing a crucial role in its conservation.

Under its Geographical Indication tag, it is referred to as "Koraput Kalajeera Rice".

== Name ==
Koraput Kalajeera rice is a prized crop in Koraput and so named after it. The word "Kalajeera" is made up of 2 words - "Kala" meaning black in the state language of Odia, while "Jeera" means Cumin seeds. It is referred as the "Prince of Rice".

=== Local name ===
It is known locally as "Koraputer Kalaajira Dhan" (କୋରାପୁଟର କଳାଜିରା ଧାନ)

== Description ==
This variety of rice is aromatic and distinct, with a unique color, taste, texture, and aroma. It has black paddy, but the obtained rice is white.

== Uses ==
The Kalajeera rice, cultivated by Koraput's tribals for generations, holds spiritual significance as it's used to prepare the sacred Prasad or Bhog offered at the Lingaraj and Ananta Basudev temples in Bhubaneswar. This initiative aims to promote and encourage the cultivation of Kalajeera.

== Geographical indication ==
It was awarded the Geographical Indication (GI) status tag from the Geographical Indications Registry under the Union Government of India on 2 January 2024 (valid until 10 January 2032).

Jaivik Sri Farmers Producer Company Limited from Pujariput, proposed the GI registration of Koraput Kalajeera rice. After filing the application in January 2022, the rice was granted the GI tag in 2024 by the Geographical Indications Registry in Chennai, making the name "Koraput Kalajeera rice" exclusive to the rice grown in the region. It thus became the first rice variety from Odisha and the 25th type of goods from Odisha to earn the GI tag.

The GI tag protects the rice from illegal selling and marketing, and gives it legal protection and a unique identity.
