= Bhottada people =

Bhottada
Total population
- 450,771 (2011)

Regions with significant populations
- Odisha: 450,771

Languages
- Odia, Bhatri

Religion
- Hinduism • Christianity

The Bhottada (also known as Dhotada, Bhotra, Bhatra, Bhattara, Bhotora, Bhatara) is an ethnic group found mainly in many districts of Odisha and Chhattisgarh states of India. The 2011 census showed their population to be around 450,771. They are classified as a Scheduled Tribe by the Indian government.

== Etymology and origins ==
The name Bhottada is derived from the words Bhu meaning earth and Tara, meaning chase. It is said that they migrated from Bastar.

== Subdivisions ==
They have a number of exogamous totemistic clans or gotras named after different animals such as tortoise, tiger, cobra, monkey, dog, lizard, goat, etc. The clan members who are of a particular animal totem respect the same animals.

The clans has agnatic lineages formed as local descent groups who live close to each other in villages.

The tribe is divided into two divisions called Bada and Sana. Badas are higher in social hierarchy, They claim to be of purer descent. The divisions are endogamous however nowadays intermarriage takes place between them.

== Culture ==
Marriage by negotiation is called Bibha. It is considered ideal and prestigious. It involves elaborate process and is expensive. Other ways of acquiring mates such as by elopement, by capture, by service are practised. Cross-cousin marriage, junior levirate and sororate, divorce and remarriage are permitted on reasonable grounds.

They bury their dead. They worship Hindu deities and their own pantheon includes Budhi Thakurani, Bhairabi Budhi, Pardesi, Basumata, Banadurga, etc. Their chief festivals are Chait Parab, Akhiturti, Nua Khiaand Dussera. The traditional chief of the village is the Naik. Assisted by Chalan, Pujari and Gonda, he handles the community affairs. At the regional level a group of villages constitute a Desh headed by Bhat Naik and supported by Panigrahi and Desia Gonda who mitigate inter-village disputes.

== See also ==
- Tribes of India
