= Desia language =

Indo-Aryan language variety of India

Desia
- Desiya, Desia Odia, Kotia, Adivasi Odia, Koraputia
- ଦେଶିଆ
- Native to: India
- Region: Odisha (Koraput, Malkangiri, Rayagada, Nabarangpur) & Andhra Pradesh ( Vizianagaram District, Alluri Sitharama Raju district , Visakhapatnam District, Anakapalli district)
- Ethnicity: Odias
- Native speakers: 230,000 (2011 census)
- Language family: Indo-European: Indo-Iranian; Indo-Aryan; Eastern; Odia; Desia
- Writing system: Odia

Language codes
- ISO 639-3: Either: dso – Desiya ort – Adivasi Oriya
- Glottolog: adiv1239

A native Bonda and Odia speaker code-switching and speaking in Bonda and Desia

Desia, also known as Desiya, Kotia, Adivasi Odia, Desia Odia or Koraputia, is an Indo-Aryan language variety of Odia, spoken in Koraput, Nabarangpur, Rayagada, Malkangiri districts Odisha and in the hilly regions of Vishakhapatnam and Vizianagaram districts of Andhra Pradesh. The variant spoken in Koraput is called Koraputia.

Desia Odia serves as the lingua franca among the different ethnic groups in the area and is the major regional tribal-non-tribal dialect continuum of the undivided Koraput district of the Southwestern Odisha region.

== Phonology ==
Desia language has 19 consonant phonemes, 2 semivowel phonemes and 6 vowel phonemes.

Desia vowel phonemes
	Front	Central	Back
High	i		u
Mid	e		o
Low		a	ɔ

There are no long vowels in Desia just like Standard Odia.

Desia consonant phonemes
		Labial	Alveolar /Dental	Retroflex	Palatal	Velar	Glottal
Nasal		m	n	ɳ		ŋ	
Stop/ Affricate	voiceless	p	t	ʈ	tʃ	k	
Stop/ Affricate	voiced	b	d	ɖ	dʒ	ɡ	
Fricative			s				ɦ
Trill/Flap			ɾ	ɽ~ɽʱ			
Lateral approximant			l				
Approximant		w			j		

Desia shows the loss of retroflex consonant like voiced retroflex lateral approximant [ɭ] (ଳ) which are present in Standard Odia, and a limited usage of retroflex unaspirated nasal (voiced retroflex nasal) ɳ (ଣ). More strikingly though, it also shows the loss of aspirated and murmured consonants (strikingly similar to Proto-Dravidian and Proto-Munda).
