= Kolab Dam =

Dam in from Jeypore, Odisha, India

Kolab Dam କୋଲାବ ଜଳବନ୍ଧ
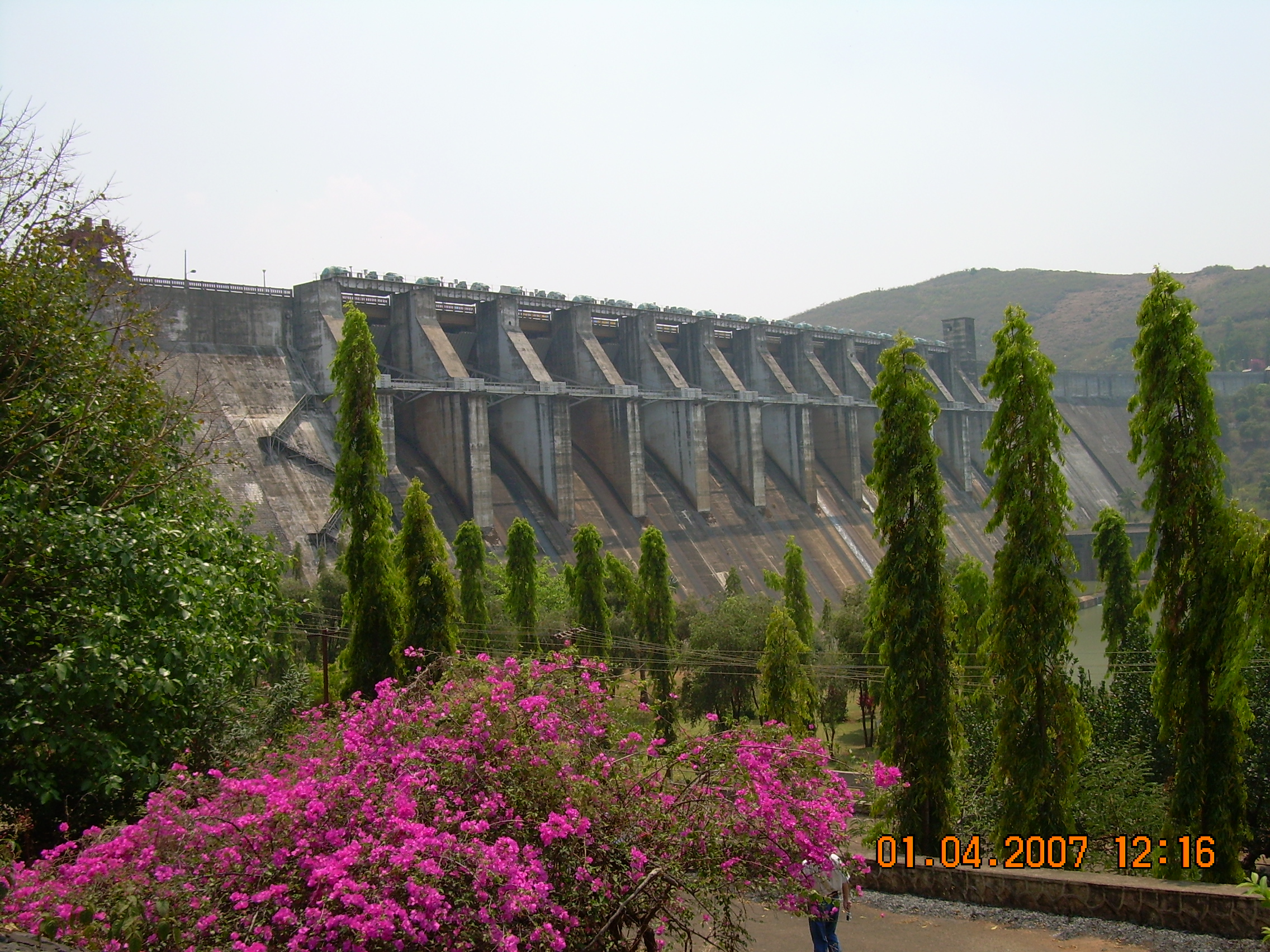
- Kolab Dam in April 2007

- Location within India
- Official name: Upper Kolab Dam
- Location: 5km from Jeypore, Odisha
- Coordinates: 18°47′18″N 82°36′01″E
- Construction began: 1976
- Opening date: 1993

Dam and spillways
- Type of dam: Straight, Masonry, Gravity
- Impounds: Kolab River
- Height: 54.50 m (179 ft)
- Length: 630.50 m (2,068.6 ft)
- Spillways: 11
- Spillway type: Ogee
- Spillway capacity: 10020 (cumec)

Reservoir
- Creates: Upper Kolab Reservoir
- Total capacity: 1,000,000,000 m^{3} (810,000 acre⋅ft)
- Catchment area: 1,630 km^{2} (630 mi^{2})
- Surface area: 100 km^{2} (39 mi^{2})

Upper Kolab Power Station
- Coordinates: 18°49′54″N 82°35′37″E
- Operator: OHPC
- Commission date: 1993
- Turbines: 4 x 80 Francis-type
- Installed capacity: 320 MW

The Kolab Dam, officially known as the Upper Kolab Dam, is a gravity dam built on the Kolab River near Jeypore in the Koraput district of Odisha, India. Constructed at an altitude of approximately 914.4 metres (3,000 ft) above sea level in the Eastern Ghats, it serves as a multipurpose project providing hydroelectric power, irrigation, and drinking water to southern Odisha. The dam is considered one of the most significant infrastructure achievements in the region due to its strategic location, design, and socio-economic impact.

== Characteristics ==
The Kolab Dam is a straight masonry gravity dam situated near Jeypore in the Koraput district of Odisha, India. Constructed across the Kolab River, a tributary of the Godavari, the dam stands at a height of 54.5 meters and spans a length of 630.5 meters. It is located at an elevation of approximately 914.4 meters (3,000 feet) above sea level, making it one of the highest-altitude reservoirs in Odisha.

The dam features an ogee-type spillway equipped with 11 radial gates, each measuring 12.2 by 12.2 meters, designed to handle a maximum flood discharge of 10,020 cubic meters per second. The reservoir has a gross storage capacity of 1,215 million cubic meters and a live storage capacity of 935 million cubic meters, covering a catchment area of 1,630 square kilometers. The water spread area at full reservoir level is approximately 114.32 square kilometers.

The hydroelectric power station associated with the dam comprises four Francis-type turbines, each with a capacity of 80 MW, totaling an installed capacity of 320 MW. The plant utilizes a net head of 253 meters and generates approximately 832.2 million units of electricity annually, which is distributed to the regional grid via the Jeypore substation.

In addition to power generation, the dam supports irrigation over an area of 47,985 hectares and supplies drinking water to the towns of Damanjodi, Koraput, Sunabeda, and Jeypore, thereby playing a crucial role in the socio-economic development of the region.

== History ==
A possible idea of "A project of Kolab dam" were first come during the British Rule when Koraput district was a part of Madras presidency. After Independence, an investigation was taken place by Govt. of Odisha in 1961. Finally the project was approved by the planning commission after several proposals of Govt. of Odisha in 1976 and the project was completed in 1993.

== Upper Kolab Hydro Electric Project ==
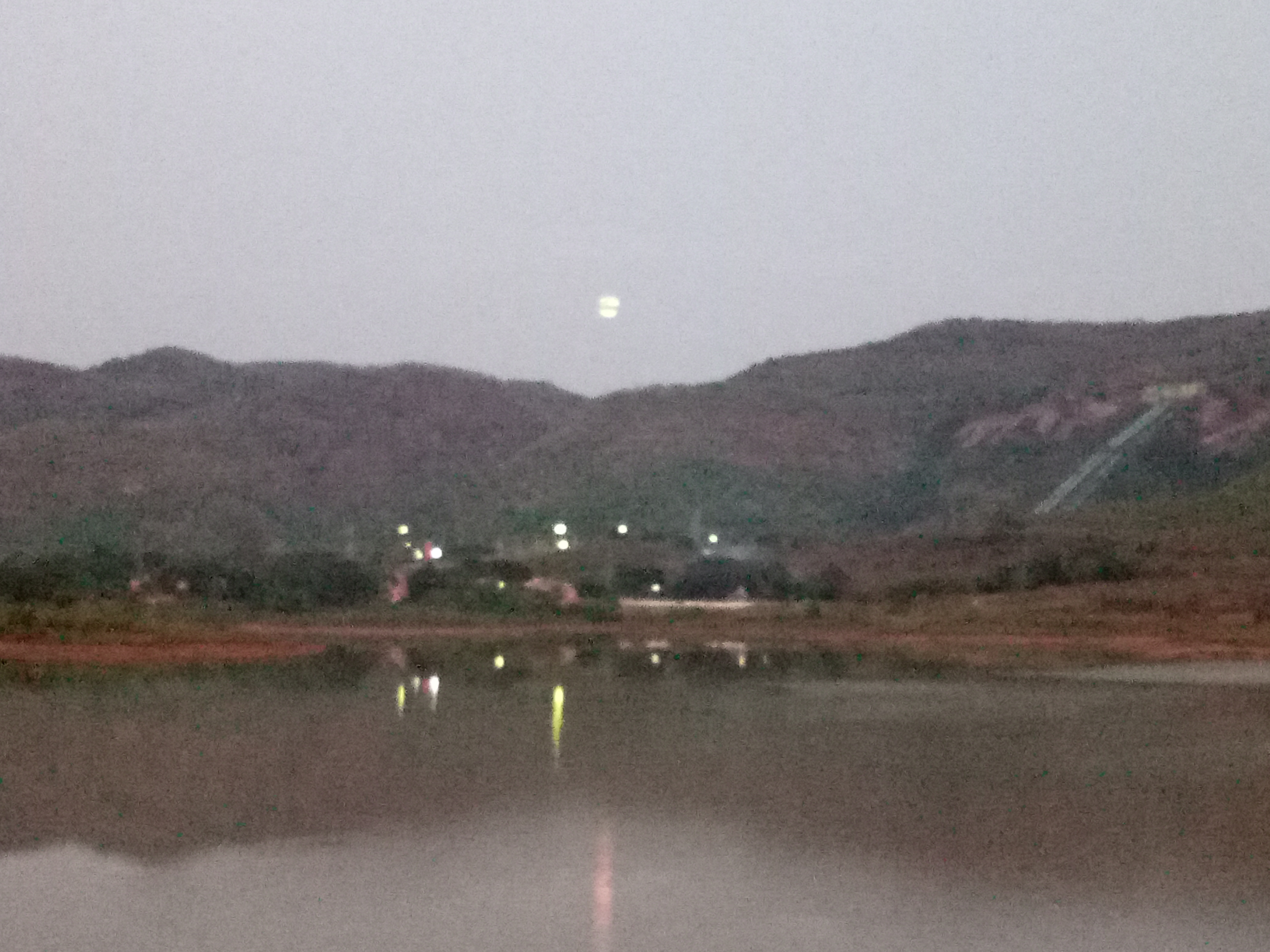
Upper Kolab Power Station

This Project is utilising the water potential of river Kolab, a tributary of river Godavari. The Project has got a Potential of producing 95 MW of firm power with a generation of 832.2 million units and power is distributed to the general grid at the jeypore sub-station.

== Tourism ==
Kolab Dam is identified as the most Beautiful natural scenic attraction in Odisha. A Botanical garden named Kolab Park built near the dam has around 200 varieties of Flowering plants. Kolab Power Plant located at an altitude of about 914.4 m (3,000 ft) above sea level, is making this place even more beautiful. Thousands of Tourists are attracted to this place to spend the weekend picnic and boating every year.

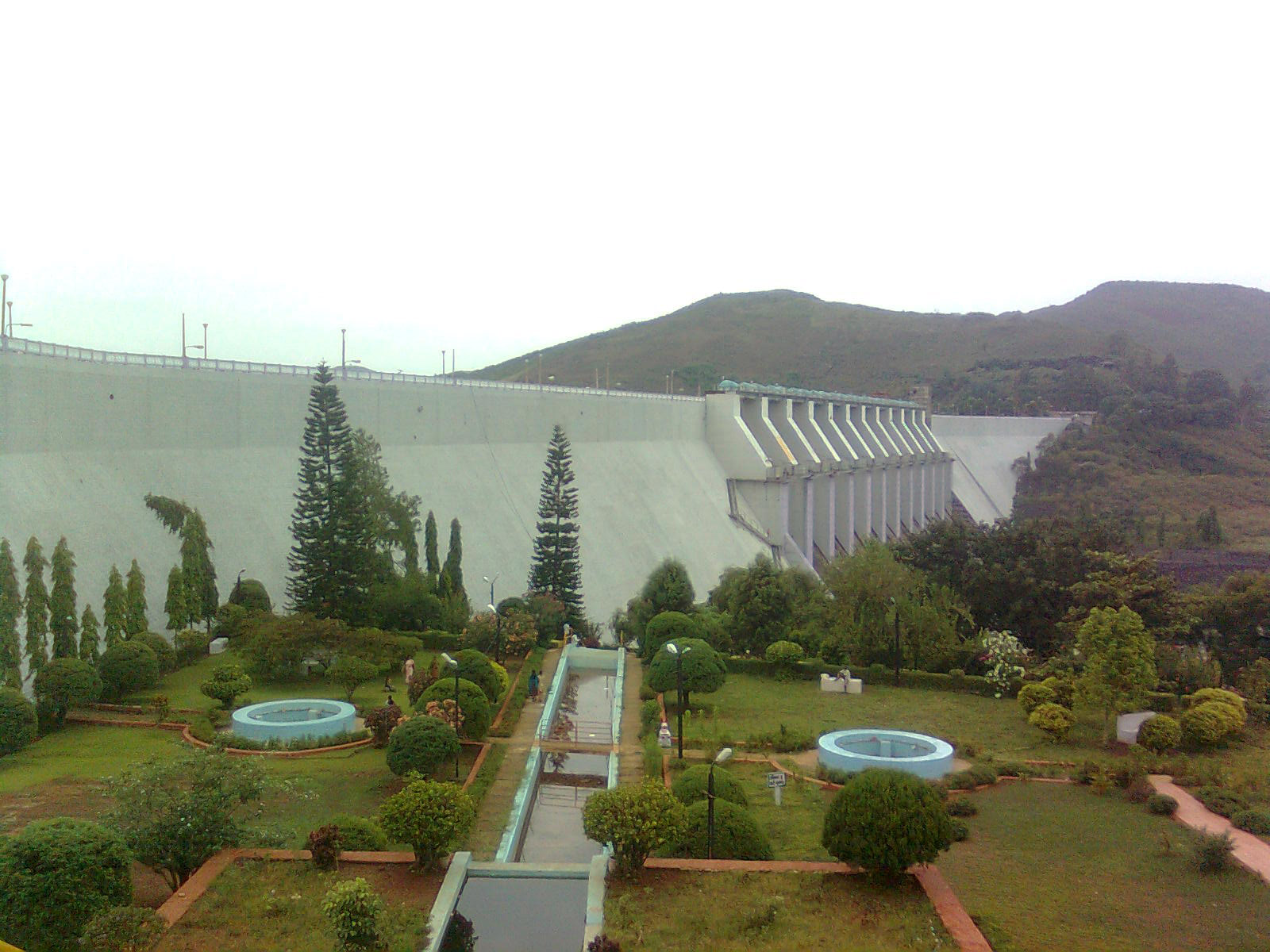

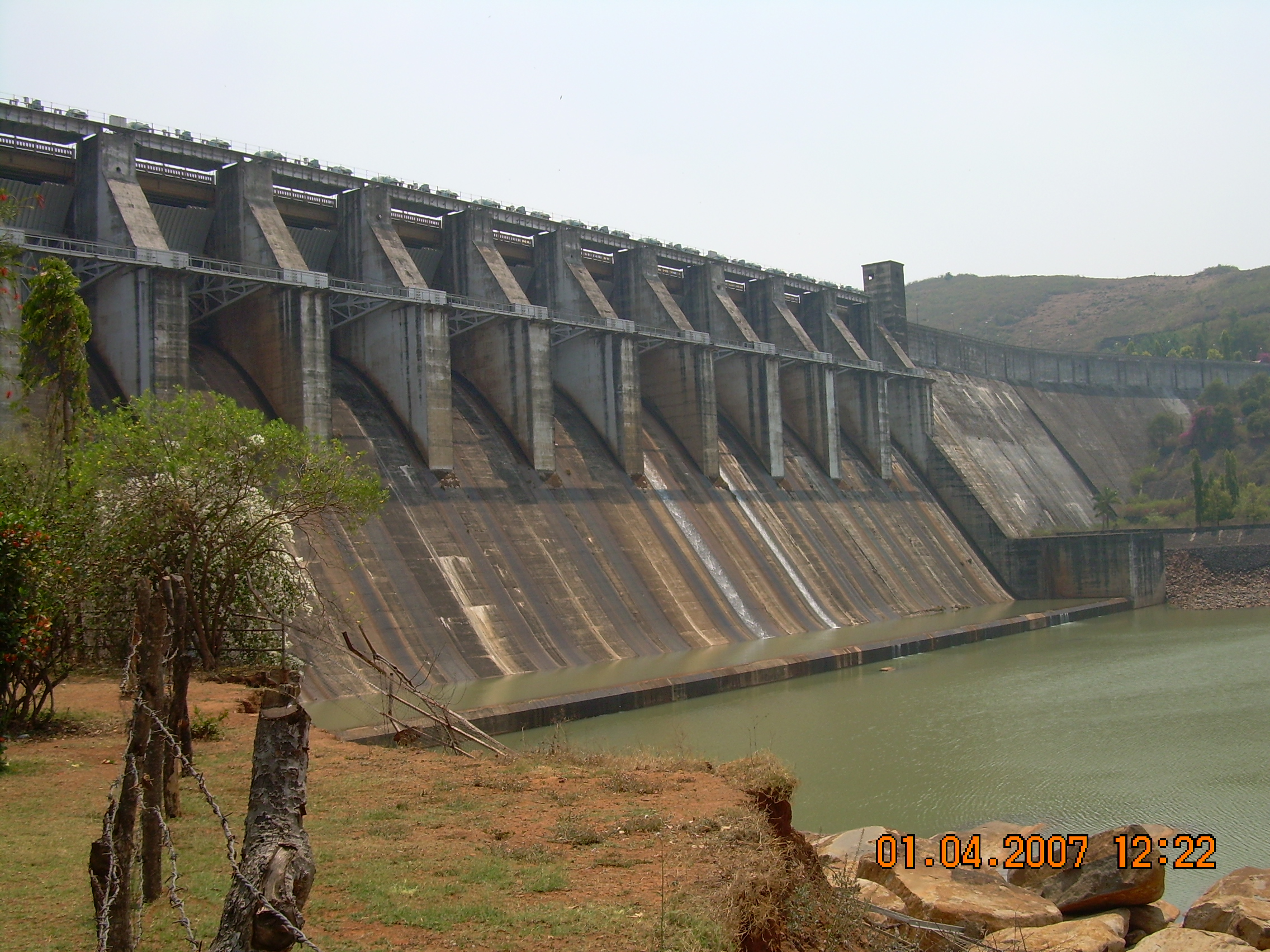

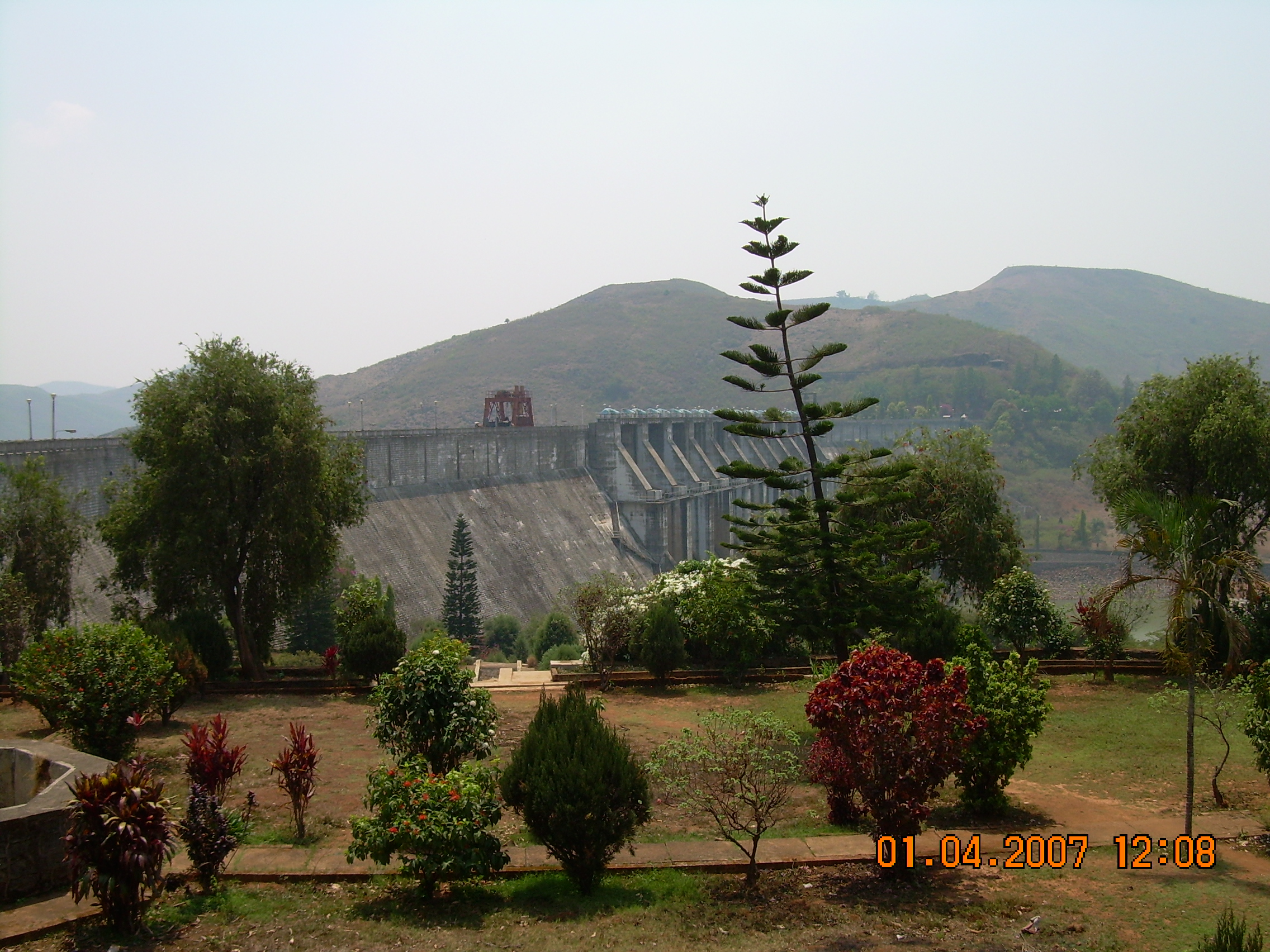

== Panoramic views ==
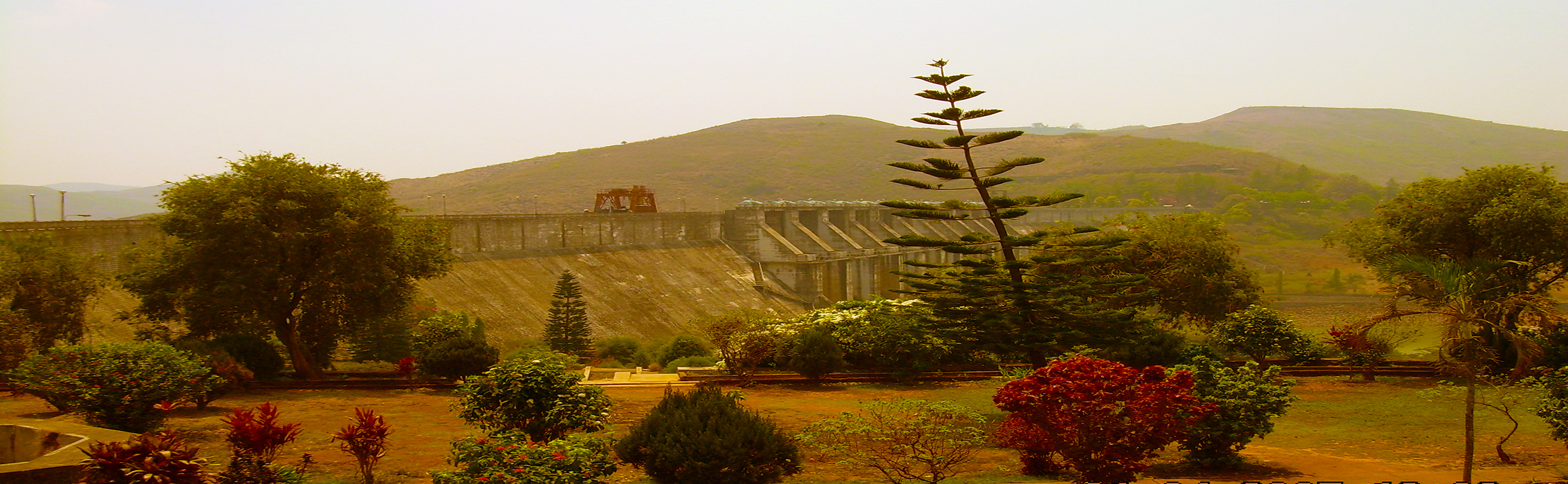
Kolab dam in April 2007

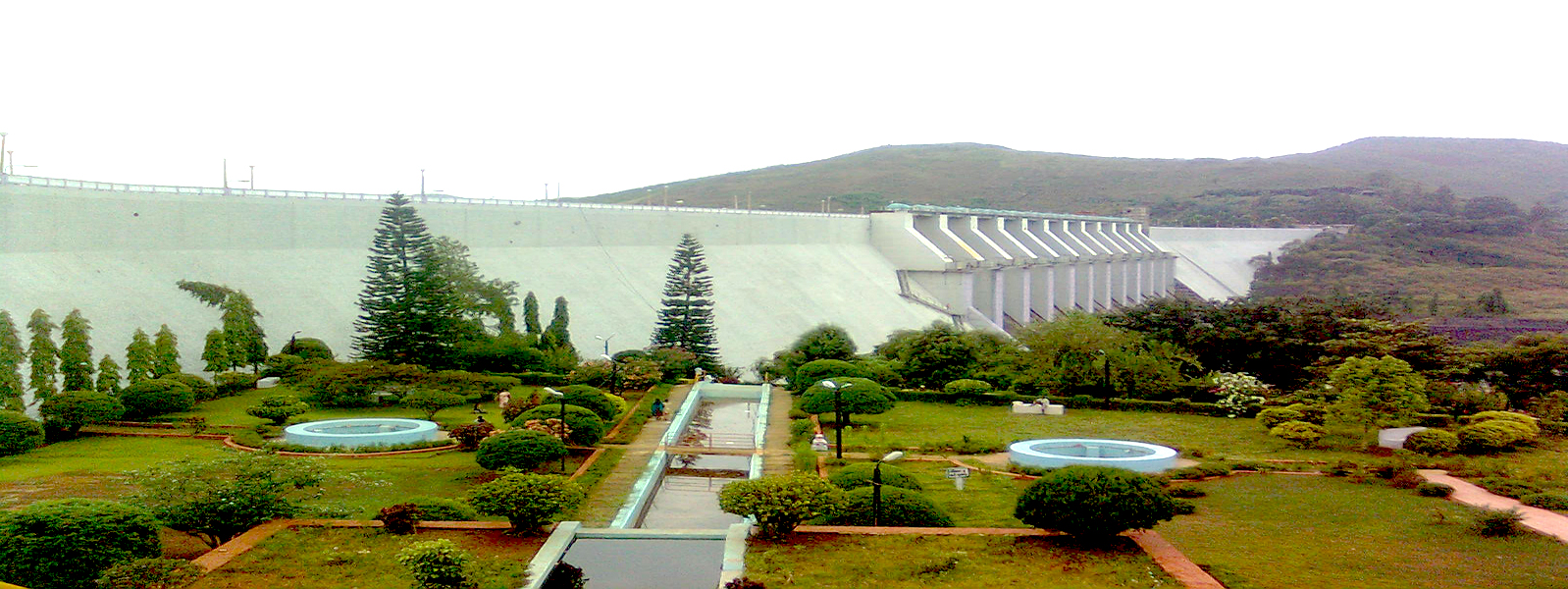
Kolab dam in June 2011
