= Kolab Jial =

- Town
- Kolab Jial
- Country: Pakistan
- Province: Sindh

Government
  - Chief: Engr Sardar Haji Ali Gohar Khan Abro (Chairman of SAWA)
- Time zone: UTC+5 (PST)

Kolab Jial is a town and Union council of Kingri Taluka, Sindh, Pakistan. It is located near Tando Masti by pass stop.
