= Sundargarh Lok Sabha constituency =

Lok Sabha constituency in Odisha

Coordinates: 22.122872°N 84.042673°E

Sundargarh (ST) OD-2
- Lok Sabha constituency
- Interactive Map Outlining Sundargarh Lok Sabha constituency

Constituency details
- Country: India
- Region: East India
- State: Odisha
- Assembly constituencies: Talsara; Sundargarh; Biramitrapur; Raghunathpali; Rourkela; Rajgangpur; Bonai
- Established: 1952
- Total electors: 15,79,096 (Note: as on 2024) (Note: as data published by election commission)
- Reservation: ST

Member of Parliament
- 18th Lok Sabha
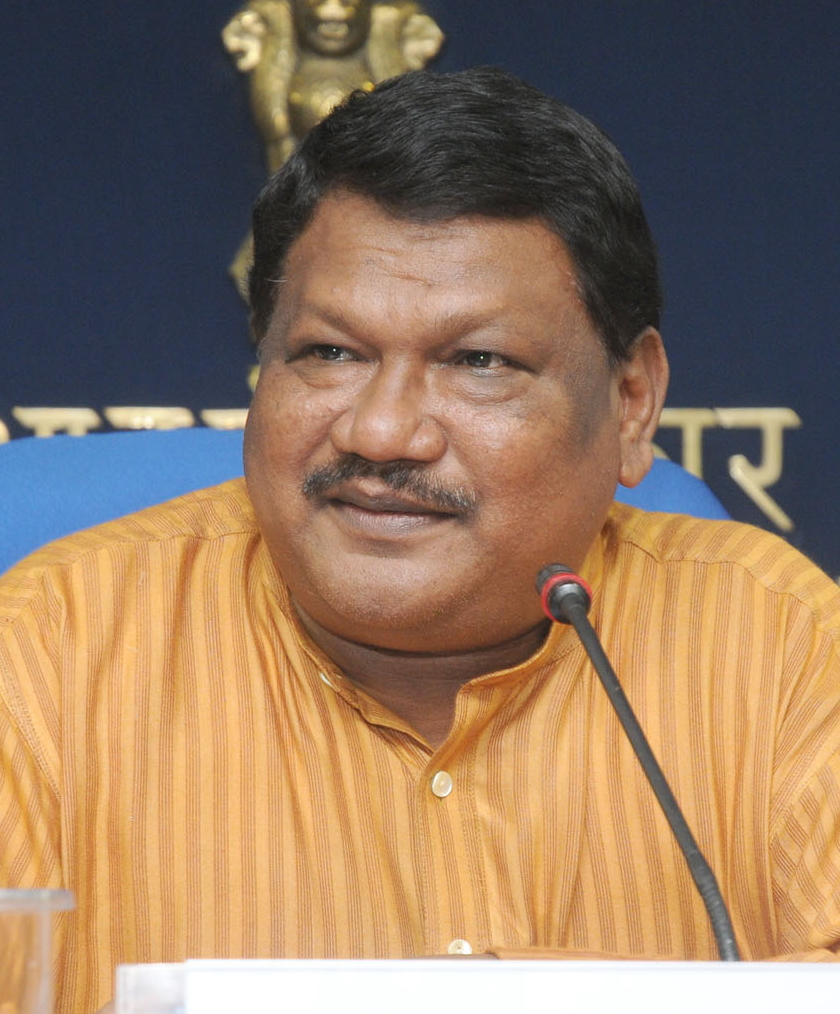
- Incumbent Jual Oram; Union Minister of Tribal Affairs
- Party: BJP
- Elected year: 2024

Sundargarh Lok Sabha constituency is one of the 21 Lok Sabha Constituencies representing Sundergarh district of Odisha state in Eastern India.

== Assembly Segments ==
Assembly segments which constitute this parliamentary constituency are:

#	Name	District	Member	Party	Leading (in 2024)
8	Talsara (ST)	Sundargarh	Bhabani Shankar Bhoi	BJP	BJP
9	Sundargarh (ST)	Sundargarh	Jogesh Kumar Singh	BJD	BJP
10	Biramitrapur (ST)	Sundargarh	Rohit Joseph Tirkey	BJD	BJP
11	Raghunathpali (SC)	Sundargarh	Durga Charan Tanti	BJP	BJP
12	Rourkela	Sundargarh	Sarada Prashad Nayak	BJD	BJP
13	Rajgangpur (ST)	Sundargarh	C. S. Raazen Ekka	INC	INC
14	Bonai (ST)	Sundargarh	Laxman Munda	CPI(M)	BJD

== Elected Members ==
Vote share of winning candidates
2024	42.77%
2019	45.42%
2014	24.14%
2009	22.42%
2004	45.96%
1999	52.85%
1998	47.71%
1996	28.44%
1991	37.23%
1989	54.37%
1984	56.99%
1980	41.27%
1977	53.24%
1971	35.03%

Since its formation in 1952, 18 elections have been held till date.

List of members elected from Sundargarh constituency are:

Year	Member	Party
2024	Jual Oram	Bharatiya Janata Party
2019	Jual Oram	Bharatiya Janata Party
2014	Jual Oram	Bharatiya Janata Party
2009	Hemananda Biswal	Indian National Congress
2004	Jual Oram	Bharatiya Janata Party
1999	Jual Oram	Bharatiya Janata Party
1998	Jual Oram	Bharatiya Janata Party
1996	Frida Topno	Indian National Congress
1991	Frida Topno	Indian National Congress
1989	Debananda Amat	Janata Dal
1984	Maurice Kujur	Indian National Congress
1980	Christopher Ekka	Indian National Congress (I)
1977	Debananda Amat	Bharatiya Lok Dal
1971	Gajadhar Majhi	Indian National Congress
1967	Debananda Amat	Swatantra Party
1962	Yagnyanarayan Singh	Ganatantra Parishad
1957	Kalo Chandramani	Ganatantra Parishad
1951	Sibnarayan Singh Mahapatra	Indian National Congress

== Election results ==
=== 2024 ===
Voting were held on 20 May 2024 in 5th phase of Indian General Election. Counting of votes was on 4 June 2024. In 2024 election, Bharatiya Janata Party candidate Jual Oram defeated Biju Janata Dal candidate Dilip Kumar Tirkey by 1,38,808 votes.

2024 Indian general election: Sundargarh
Party	Candidate	Votes	%	±%
BJP	Jual Oram	494,282	42.77	
BJD	Dilip Kumar Tirkey	3,55,474	30.76	
INC	Janardan Dehury	2,61,986	22.67	
NOTA	None of the above	17,801	1.51	
Majority		1,38,808	12.01	
Turnout		11,59,760	73.44	
BJP hold				

=== 2019 ===
In 2019 election, Bharatiya Janata Party candidate Jual Oram defeated Biju Janata Dal candidate Sunita Biswal by 2,23,065 votes.

2019 Indian general elections: Sundargarh
Party	Candidate	Votes	%	±%
BJP	Jual Oram	500,056	45.45	▲11.76
BJD	Sunita Biswal	2,76,991	25.18	▼6.65
INC	George Tirkey	2,68,218	24.38	▼2.30
Independent	Miss Juspin Lakra	14,790	1.34	
NOTA	None of the above	13,675	1.24	▼0.33
SUCI(C)	Jastin Lugun	9,524	0.87	▼0.07
Majority		2,23,065	20.27	▲18.41
Turnout		11,01,049	71.89	▼1.21
BJP hold		Swing	▲9.21	

=== 2014 ===
In 2014 election, Bharatiya Janata Party candidate Jual Oram defeated Biju Janata Dal candidate Dilip Tirkey by a margin of 18,829 votes.

2014 Indian general elections: Sundargarh
Party	Candidate	Votes	%	±%
BJP	Jual Oram	340,508	33.69	
BJD	Dilip Tirkey	3,21,679	31.83	
INC	Hemananda Biswal	2,69,335	26.65	
NOTA	None of the above	15,835	1.57	−
SUCI(C)	Jastin Lugun	9,472	0.94	
BSP	Bagi Lakra	9,460	0.94	
Majority		18,829	1.86	−
Turnout		10,10,723	71.66	
BJP gain from INC				

=== 2009 ===
In 2009 election, Indian National Congress candidate Hemananda Biswal defeated Bharatiya Janata Party candidate Jual Oram by a margin of 11,624 votes.

2009 Indian general elections: Sundargarh
Party	Candidate	Votes	%	±%
INC	Hemananda Biswal	280,054	36.47	
BJP	Jual Oram	2,68,430	34.96	
JMM	Livinus Kindo	74,558	9.71	
CPI(M)	Salomi Minz	71,582	9.32	
Majority		11,624	1.52	
Turnout		7,67,284	61.43	
INC gain from BJP				
