= Mangala Kisan =

Indian politician (born 1946)

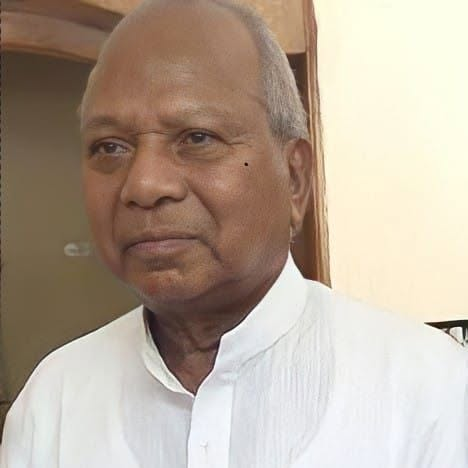
- Mangala Kisan in 2022

Member of Odisha Legislative Assembly
- In office 1985–2004
- Preceded by: Mukharam Naik
- Succeeded by: Gregory Minz
- Constituency: Rajgangpur
- In office 2014–2019
- Preceded by: Gregory Minz
- Succeeded by: C. S. Raazen Ekka
- Constituency: Rajgangpur

Member Of Parliament Of Rajya Sabha
- In office 3 April 2008 – 2 April 2014
- Preceded by: Dilip Ray
- Succeeded by: Prasanna Acharya
- Constituency: Odisha

Minister Of Odisha Government
- In office 4 January 1993 – 15 March 1995
- Chief Minister: Biju Patnaik
- In office 5 March 2000 – 6 August 2002
- Chief Minister: Naveen Patnaik
- In office 6 August 2002 – 15 May 2004
- Chief Minister: Naveen Patnaik
- In office 15 March 1990 – 1 January 1991
- Chief Minister: Biju Patnaik
- In office 1 January 1991 – 15 March 1995
- Chief Minister: Biju Patnaik

Personal details
- Born: 6 June 1946 (age 80) Sundargarh Orissa
- Party: Biju Janata Dal(2000-Present)
- Other political affiliations: Janata Party (1980-1985); Janata Dal (1985-2000)
- Spouse: Filicia Kisan
- Children: Three sons and one daughter
- Website: https://m.facebook.com/mangla.kisan.90/

Mangala Kisan (born 6 June 1946) is an Indian politician and former member of the Odisha legislative assembly from the Biju Janata Dal party. He was a member of the Parliament of India representing Orissa in the Rajya Sabha From 2 April 2008 To 3 April 2014, the upper house of the Indian Parliament. He was a Member of the Odisha Legislative Assembly representing Rajgangpur From 1985 to 2004 & 2014 to 2019 is the longest serving member of odisha legislative assembly from the Rajgangpur constituency. He was state minister in the Government of Odisha in both the Biju Patnaik Cabinet and the Naveen Patnaik Cabinet.

== Life ==
Mangala Kisan was born at raibahal ambogova of kutra block in sundargarh district. Kisan is well known figure in the area of Sundargarh Lok Sabha constituency.

== Political life ==
Kisan Constesed Assembly election 8 times In 1980,1985,1990,1995,2004,2014 and 2019. Kisan Constested Loksabha Election two times in 1991 and 1996.

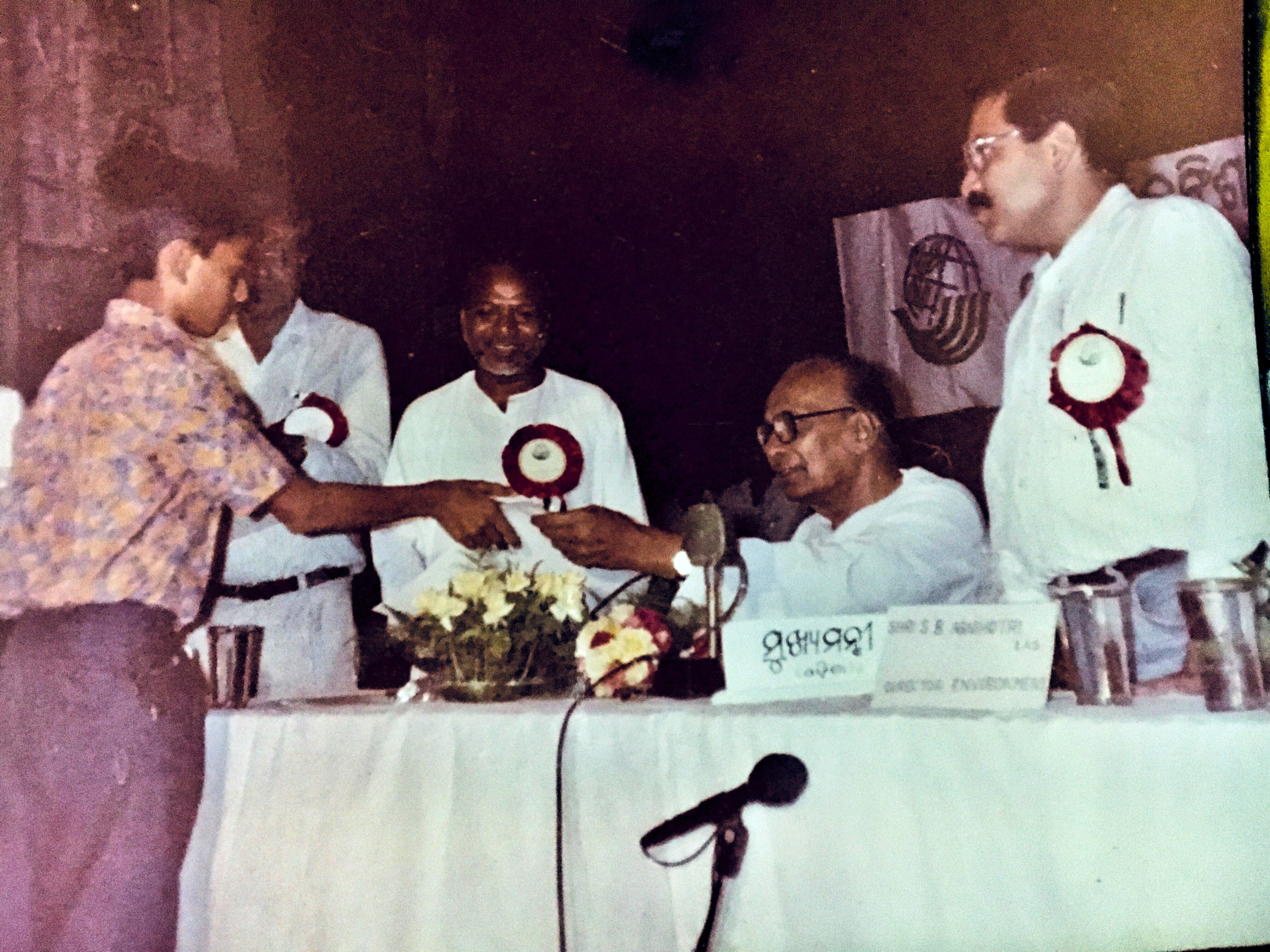
Kisan with then chief minister Biju Patnaik in late 1990s in a event.

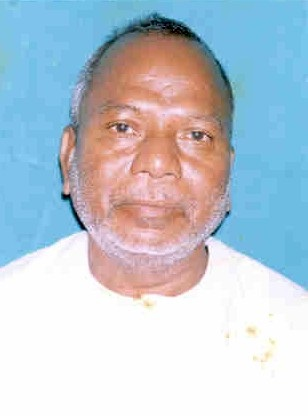
Mla Portrait,1990.

== Electoral History ==
=== 2019 ===
In 2019 election, Indian National Congress candidate C. S. Raazen Ekka defeated Biju Janata Dal candidate Mangala Kisan by 946 votes.

2019 Odisha Legislative Assembly election: Rajgangpur
| Party | Candidate | Votes | % | ±% |
|---|---|---|---|---|
| INC | C. S. Raazen Ekka | 53,918 | 30.98 | ▲3.07 |
| BJD | Mangala Kisan | 52,972 | 30.44 | ▼3.75 |
| BJP | Narasingha Minz | 52,896 | 30.39 | ▲12.42 |
| NOTA | None of the above | 995 | 0.57 | − |
| Majority | | 946 | 0.54 | |
| Turnout | | 174030 | 68.79 | |
| INC gain from BJD | | Swing | | |

=== 2014 ===
In 2014 election, Biju Janata Dal candidate Mangala Kisan defeated Indian National Congress candidate Gregory Minz by 10,036 votes.

2014 Vidhan Sabha Election, Rajgangpur
| Party | Candidate | Votes | % | ±% |
|---|---|---|---|---|
| BJD | Mangala Kisan | 54,596 | 34.19 | ▲6.85 |
| INC | Gregory Minz | 44,560 | 27.91 | ▼3.0 |
| BJP | Upendra Pradhan | 28,694 | 17.97 | ▲3.51 |
| NOTA | None of the above | 1,105 | 0.69 | − |
| Majority | | 10,036 | 6.28 | |
| Turnout | | 1,59,675 | 70.83 | |
| Registered electors | | 2,25,420 | | |
| BJD gain from INC | | | | |

=== 2004 ===
2004 Vidhan Sabha Election, Rajgangpur
| Party | Candidate | Votes | % | ±% |
|---|---|---|---|---|
| INC | Gregory Minz | 59,165 | 50.79 | − |
| BJD | Mangala Kisan | 48,116 | 41.30 | − |
| Independent | Anjela Tete | 5,949 | 5.11 | − |
| Jharkhand Party | Clara Barla | 3,265 | 2.80 | − |
| Majority | | 11,049 | 9.5 | |
| Turnout | | 1,74,361 | 50.79 | |
| INC hold | | | | |

=== 2000 ===
2000 Vidhan Sabha Election, Rajgangpur
| Party | Candidate | Votes | % | ±% |
|---|---|---|---|---|
| BJD | Mangala Kisan | 44,017 | 45.69 | − |
| INC | Damayanti Roudia | 30,362 | 31.51 | − |
| JMM | William Xess | 20,505 | 21.28 | − |
| BSP | Binod Bihari Pradhan | 726 | 0.75 | − |
| Majority | | 13,655 | 45.69 | − |
| Turnout | | 1,72,019 | 56.9 | |
| BJD hold | | | | |

=== 1995 ===
1995 Vidhan Sabha Election, Rajgangpur
| Party | Candidate | Votes | % | ±% |
|---|---|---|---|---|
| JD | Mangala Kisan | 42,083 | 37.93 | − |
| JMM | William Xess | 31,896 | 28.75 | − |
| INC | Rajesh Ekka | 19,235 | 17.34 | − |
| SJP(R) | Bailo Kisan | 8,711 | 7.85 | − |
| Majority | | 10,187 | 37.93 | − |
| Turnout | | 1,55,912 | 74.1% | |
| JD hold | | | | |

=== 1990 ===
1990 Vidhan Sabha Election, Rajgangpur
| Party | Candidate | Votes | % | ±% |
|---|---|---|---|---|
| JD | Mangala Kisan | 40,674 | 64.26 | − |
| INC | Christopher Ekka | 14,850 | 23.46 | − |
| BJP | Kumud Gadtia | 2,597 | 4.10 | − |
| JMM | Egnesh Minz | 2,326 | 3.67 | − |
| Majority | | 25,824 | 64.26 | − |
| Turnout | | 1,34,294 | 48.4 | |
| JD hold | | | | |
