= Bisra Assembly constituency =

Former constituency of the Odisha Legislative Assembly, in India

Coordinates: 22.25°N 85.00°E

Bisra
- Former constituency for the Odisha Legislative Assembly

Constituency details
- Country: India
- Region: East India
- State: Odisha
- District: Sundargarh
- Lok Sabha constituency: Sundargarh
- Established: 1951
- Abolished: 1973
- Total electors: 62,845
- Reservation: ST

Bisra was a constituency of the Odisha Legislative Assembly of Sundergarh district, Odisha state in India. It was formed in 1952, and was abolished in 1973. It was replaced by the constituencies of Biramitrapur and Raghunathpali. It was reserved for the Scheduled Tribes.

== Historical Extent ==
- 1964: Bisra and Birmitrapur police stations in Panposh subdivision.
- 1961: Panposh sub-division (excluding Raghunathpali and Rourkela police stations).
- 1951: Panposh sub-division (excluding Raghunathpalli police station).

== Elected members ==
Vote share of Winning candidates
1971	38.00%
1967	37.67%
1961	26.97%
1957	41.18%
1951	64.59%

Five elections were held between 1951 and 1971. List of members elected from this constituency are

Year	Con. No.	Member	Party
1952	38	Madan Mohan Amat	Indian National Congress
1957	44	Nirmal Munda	Independent
1961	65	Premchand Bhagat	Ganatantra Parishad
1967	124	Krushna Chandra Nayak	Swatantra Party
1971	124	Kullan Bagf	All India Jharkhand Party

== Election results ==
=== 1971 ===
1971 Odisha Legislative Assembly election: Bisra
Party	Candidate	Votes	%	±%
All India Jharkhand Party	Kullan Bagf	8,709	38.00%	New
INC	Patras Oram	5,942	25.93%	▲5.09
SWA	Krushna Chandra Nayak	4,408	19.23%	▼18.4
Utkal Congress	Sourendra P. Singhdeo	1,996	8.71%	New
PSP	Tarkan Oram	764	3.33%	New
Independent	Aibinus Xess	488	2.13%	New
Independent	Christopal Purty	332	1.45%	New
SSP	Aijub Oram	280	1.22%	New
Total valid votes		22,919		
Rejected ballots		1,765		
Turnout		24,684	39.28%	▼9.86
Registered electors		62,845		▲
Margin of victory		2,767	12.7%	▼4.12
All India Jharkhand Party gain from SWA				

=== 1967 ===
1967 Odisha Legislative Assembly election: Bisra
Party	Candidate	Votes	%	±%
SWA	K. C. Nayak	9,672	37.67%	New
INC	M. Bage	5,352	20.84%	▼3.8
Independent	C. Purty	3,977	15.49%	New
Independent	T. Xess	3,933	15.32%	▼3.9
ABJS	I. Munda	1,841	7.17%	New
Independent	Y. Khalkho	902	3.51%	New
Total valid votes		25,677		
Rejected ballots		2,862		
Turnout		28,539	49.14%	▲8.61
Registered electors		58,075		▼
Margin of victory		4,320	16.82%	▲14.5
SWA gain from AIGP				

=== 1961 ===
1961 Odisha Legislative Assembly election: Bisra
Party	Candidate	Votes	%	±%
AIGP	Bhagat Premchand	6,783	26.97%	New
INC	Kharia Junas	6,199	24.64%	▼10.0
Independent	Xess Theophile	4,837	19.23%	New
Jharkhand Party	Munda Prabhusahaya	4,722	18.77%	New
Independent	Munda Nirmal	2,613	10.39%	▼30.7
Total valid votes		25,154		
Rejected ballots		2,317		
Turnout		27,471	40.53%	▼11.3
Registered electors		67,777		▲
Margin of victory		584	2.32%	▼4.19
AIGP gain from Independent				

=== 1957 ===
1957 Odisha Legislative Assembly election: Bisra
Party	Candidate	Votes	%	±%
Independent	Munda Nirmal (ST)	13,402	41.18%	▲19.0
INC	Rangaballav Amat (ST)	11,282	34.66%	▼29.9
Independent	Naik Krushna Chandra (ST)	5,296	16.27%	New
PSP	Oram Tadkan (ST)	2,566	7.88%	▲3.37
Turnout		32,546	51.90%	▼10.9
Registered electors		62,706		▲
Margin of victory		2,120	6.51%	▼35.5
Independent gain from INC				

=== 1951 ===
1952 Orissa Legislative Assembly election: Bisra
Party	Candidate	Votes	%	±%
AIGP	Madan Mohan Amat	25,756	64.59%	
Independent	Nirmala Munda	8,833	22.15%	
Independent	Sibasahai Bhagat	3,488	8.75%	
Socialist Party (India)	Tadkan Uram	1,800	4.51%	
Turnout		39,877	68.20%	
Registered electors		58,473		
Margin of victory		16,923	42.44%	Steady
INC win (new seat)				
