= Debananda Amat =

Indian politician

Member of Parliament, Lok Sabha
- In office 1989–1991
- Preceded by: Maurice Kujur
- Succeeded by: Frida Topno
- In office 1977–1980
- Preceded by: Gajadhar Majhi
- Succeeded by: Christopher Ekka
- In office 1967–1971
- Preceded by: Gajadhar Majhi
- Succeeded by: Christopher Ekka
- Constituency: Sundargarh, Odisha

Member of Parliament, Rajya Sabha
- In office 1973–1974
- Constituency: Odisha

Personal details
- Born: 16 January 1916 Balani, Sundargarh District, Orissa, British India
- Died: 21 December 2011 (aged 95)
- Party: Janata Dal
- Other political affiliations: Janata Party, Swatantra Party

Debananda Amat (1916–2011) was an Indian politician. He was elected to the Lok Sabha, the lower house of the Parliament of India from Sundargarh, Odisha, as a member of the Janata Dal.
