= Amko Simko massacre =

Massacre in Odisha, India

- Location: Amko Simko Field, Simko Village, Sundargarh, Odisha
- Date: 25 April 1939; 87 years ago
- Target: Crowd of Tribal peasants protesting unfair taxes
- Attack type: Massacre
- Deaths: 49
- Injuries: 86
- Perpetrators: Rani Janaki Ratna, Lt. E. W. Marger
- Assailant: British Indian Army
- Motive: To arrest tribal leader Nirmal Munda

The Amko Simko massacre or Amco Simco firing took place on 25 April 1939, when Lt. E. W. Marger ordered troops of the British Indian Army to open fire on a crowd of tribal peasants resisting the arrest of their leader Nirmal Munda in Simko village, Gangpur estate (now Birmitrapur, Sundergarh, Odisha).

On Tuesday, 25 April 1939, a crowd of tribal peasants had gathered under the leadership of Nirmal Munda (a freedom fighter) at Amko-Simko field. The crowd was protesting high taxes and denied land rights. Rani Janaki arrived at Simko village with a political agent, Lieutenant E. W. Marger, with the sole intent to arrest Nirmal Munda on the grounds of holding seditious meetings and assaulting a village chowkidar. The crowd was warned to hand over their leader, Nirmal Munda, and disperse. However, the crowd of tribals armed with lathis, axes, and other crude weapons resisted the arrest of their leader. Consequently, scuffles broke out and the police resorted to firing their weapons.

After they fired their weapons into the crowd, Nirmal Munda and his associates were arrested and jailed. This marked the end of the Munda agitation in Gangpur against the exorbitant taxes.

== History ==
The term "Khunt" means lineage and "Katti" means the reclaimers. The Khuntkatti is a customary institution of the Munda tribe. This age-old system is found among the Mundas of Chhotangpur region. It provides collective ownership of land among families or lineage of the same killi (clan) inside the tribe. It gives the original settlers the ownership of land, water and forests.

In 1765, Mughal Emperor Shah Alam II assigned the Diwani or revenue administration of Bengal, Bihar and Orissa to the East India Company. The Chhotanagpur region, thus, came under Company rule and subsequently British Raj. The new colonial government created laws that placed taxes on lands that had been cultivated by tribals for generations and reduced the Khuntkattidars to tenants of these lands, contrary to the Khuntkatti tradition where tribes were the owners of their lands. This was followed by a series of tribal rebellions allover the Chhotanagpur region, starting from the Tilka Manjhi revolt of 1784. Gangpur State came under the Chotanagpur states and was composed mostly of Munda and Oraon tribals. The Mundas of Gangpur claimed and demanded Khuntkatti rights. Decades of uprisings and rebellions across Chhotanagpur forced the British government to pass the Chotanagpur Tenancy Act, 1908 which recognized and safeguarded the Mundari Khuntkatti system.

The zamindari was land revenue system introduced by the British government which collected revenue from peasants through agents called zamindars. These zamindars were made owners of the land cultivated by peasants and were given the permission to collect tax or revenue from the peasants.

== Before the massacre ==
The Munda ryots (tenants) of Dahijira village did not pay rent and others supported them. In September 1935, the Mundas filed a petition with the agent to the Governor General protesting the exorbitant rates of rent. The refractory Mundas also filed several petitions before the Viceroy. Meanwhile, the local government was trying to pacify the rebels of Gangpur. The Tehsildar of Gangpur made rounds around the region persuading the tribal peasants to accept the taxes. The zamindar of Gangpur asked the GEL Church of Ranchi to influence the Mundas and stop them from agitation. The GEL Church sent a delegation that visited rebel villages and persuaded the tribal peasants to pay taxes. The queen, Rani Janaki Ratna toured these villages and requested the tribals to pay the taxes. Soon the Munda rebels started boycotting the meetings with the Rani. Eventually all persuasive actions to calm the rebellion failed. The zamindar resorted to stricter measures to pacify the rebellion. Criminal cases were started against the agitators. Warrants against some agitators with previous crimes were renewed; the lands of agitators were ordered to be confiscated. These measures couldn't stop the agitators, they made covert meetings and gradually Nirmal Munda became an important figure among agitators allover Gangpur.

In 1938, a no-rent campaign spread across Gangpur under the leadership of Nirmal Munda. On 9 February 1939, the Queen convened a meeting at Sergipalli to listen to the grievances of the people and to induce them to make payment. Around four to five thousand people from 30 villages attended and presented a charter of demands. The popular demands included not only restitution of the land rent and forest rights of 1910 settlement but also abolition of “Choukidari Tax” and monopoly on the hides. Total abolition of “Bethi, Bheti, Rasad and Magan” was demanded. The no-rent campaign was strengthened with the help of Christian Mundas, the Oraons and the Hindus of Gangpur. Bahadur Bhagat of Andali Jambahal, Tintush Munda and Yakub Gudia of Dahijira were prominent leaders of this movement. The queen of Gangpur, Rani Janaki Rathna Maharjee, also known as the Regent Rani Saheba however refused to accept the Khuntkatti rights of tribals. Nirmal Munda of Bartoli village, a World War I veteran started a no-rent campaign against the British. Along with Bahadur Bhagat, Nirmal organized the Mundas of Gangpur to refuse to pay taxes. The agitation spread among the Mundas and Oraons throughout Gangpur in 1938 under the leadership of Nirmal Munda. The same year Nirmal Munda, Mansid Topno, Bhodra Munda went to Ranchi and sent a petition to Governor General Linlithgow. A copy of this petition was given to Jaipal Singh Munda, an Adivasi politician; he met the Governor General and demanded Khuntkatti rights and the remission of taxes. The Governor General summoned Rani Janaki Ratna to Delhi and advised her to resolve the issue peacefully. But the Queen paid no heed to the demands.

== Massacre ==
The Durbar (royal court) of Gangpur was finding the circumstances unfavourable and the situation was likely to aggravate further, the Durbar sought help from the political agent at Sambalpur to suppress the rebels, and requisitioned the State Joint Police Force. The political agent and the durbar planned to arrest Nirmal Munda; it was given out that the Rani had accepted the agitators' demands and was going to declare good news at Simko village. On 25 April 1939, Adivasis had gathered in Amko Simko under the leadership of Nirmal Munda. Assistant Political Agent Lt. E. W. Marger and Sub-Divisional Officer of Nagra accompanied with two platoons of troops under a British officer appeared at Amko Simko to arrest Nirmal Munda on charges of holding seditious meetings and assaulting a village chawkidar.

"The Rani asked the people, 'Who is Nirmal Munda?' Everybody recognized the evil intention of the Rani and introduced themselves as Nirmal Munda. Later, Lt. Marger proceeded towards Nirmal Munda's house to arrest him; a young boy, Mania Munda, stood at the door to obstruct the Lieutenant. A soldier pushed his bayonet into Mania, who died on the spot."

–Fabianus Ekka, a tribal resident of Amko village.

The hundreds of tribals present at the meeting, armed with crude weapons resisted the arrest of their leader. Consequently, scuffles broke out between the police and the tribals. The police, unable to control the crowd, opened fire upon the agitators killing many and leaving several injured.

Some bodies were kept in military vans covered with tarpaulins and later, were thrown into the limekiln of Bisra Stone lime factory at Biramitrapur. Some bodies were given a mass burial at Brahmanmara, Birmitrapur. Nirmal Munda and several of his associates were arrested. He was sentenced to six years of imprisonment in Sundargarh and Sambalpur. He was released from jail on 15 August 1947.

== Casualties ==
The total number of casualties is disputed. The Government of Odisha claims that 39 people had died and 50 were left injured. no-official records say that nearly 50 people had been killed and about 100 were left injured. Dr. Mahtab, a notable leader from Odisha in the independence movement wrote in his autobiography, 'Sadhanara Pathe', that more than 300 people had died and 82 were injured in the Amko Simko firing.

=== Victims ===
There are no official government records specifying the names of victims. The following is a list of victims of the Amko Simko massacre, according to a thesis from Sambalpur University and the stone tablets placed by local tribals in memory of the victims.

==== List of victims ====
42 died on the spot, 4 died in jail and 3 were shot in jungle while fleeing.

S. No.	Name	Village
01	Mania Munda	Madhutola
02	Phulmari Gunani (Kongadi)	Madhutola
03	Lawdan Munda (Bodra)	Bhalulata
04	Harun Munda (Lugun)	Simco
05	Nathaniel Munda (Lugun)	Chanabahal
06	Martin Munda (Horo)	Khairbahar
07	Nathaniel Munda (Lugun)	Khairbahar
08	Christochit Munda (Horo)	Khairbahar
09	Johan Munda (Dang)	Bartoli
10	Sudan Munda (Bage)	Bartoli
11	Anasi Munda (Topno)	Bartoli
12	Dhanmasi Khadia(Bilung)	Paterpur
13	Puanuel Oram (Kujur)	Bilaigarh
14	Khuyun Munda (Surin)	Bilaigarh

S. No.	Name	Village
15	Ahlad Oram (Toppo)	Dhodibahar
16	Bhodro Oram (Barwa)	Dhodibahar
17	Dhuran Oram (Lakra)	Kadobahal
18	Buchku Oram (Kachhua)	Dukatoli
19	Jeetu Oram (Lakra)	Bhaghwakhandi
20	Bhulu Oram (Tirkey)	Dukatoli
21	Christ Biswas Oram	Jhunmur
22	Dhanmasi Oram (Dhanwar)	Jhunmur
23	Mansid Oram (Kindo)	Jhunmur
24	Daud Oram (Minz)	Jhunmur
25	Francis Kerketta	Jhunmur
26	Bano Khadia	Jhunmur
27	Christotem Jojo	Ranchi
28	Christodhan Munda (Bage)	Ghogar

S. No.	Name	Village
29	Paulus Oram (Dhanwar)	Ghogar
30	Sadi Munda (Hanuman)	Ghogar
31	Sukhram Munda (Horo)	Ghogar
32	Jhari Khadia (Kerketta)	Bilaigarh
33	Bhutlu Khadia (Indwar)	Ambagaon
34	Dhuran Oram (Lakra)	Dhodibahar
35	Manmasi Munda (Bhengra)	Mahuatoli
36	Nichodim Munda (Surin)	Mahuatoli
37	Mund Khadia (Dung Dung)	Bilaigarh
38	Jhankola Bhengra	Ghogar
39	Gaja Oram (Tirkey)	Baniguini
40	Samuel Oram (Tirkey)	Rengalbahar
41	Ohas Munda (Horo)	Gopur
42	Daud Munda (Bage)	Gopur

Persons who died in Jail
S. No.	Name	Village
43	Bhawa Oram (Tirkey)	Nuagaon
44	Khusus Oram	Rajgangpur
45	Suleman Munda (Dang)	Jhunumbira
46	Christonand Munda (Lugun)	Purnapani

Persons who died in jungle
S. No.	Name
47	Jaimasi Munda (Surin)
48	Jachrias Munda (Soy)
49	Etwa Munda (Surin)

== Aftermath ==
Odia newspapers like Samaj, Deshakata and Nabeen condemned the inhuman firing. Dhananjay Mohanty, a Congress worker and freedom fighter from Gangpur put great effort in bringing this incident to limelight. Some days after the firing, Gandhiji with Kasturba Gandhi and Mahadev Desai were travelling to Calcutta when the train halted at Kalunga station; Dhananjay along with Shashibhushan Panigrahi and Ganesh Singh got into the train and informed Gandhiji in detail about the firing at Amko Simko which greatly shocked Gandhi. Dhananjay's effort helped bring this incident to public notice; Jawaharlal Nehru and Laxminarayan Mishra wanted to visit the site of firing but were stopped by the police. Nehru decided to organise a satyagraha against this, but Gandhiji advised Nehru that starting a satyagraha in a Garhjat state will be unwise. The Amko Simko firing and the arrest of Nirmal Munda marked the end of the tribal uprising and the no-rent campaign.

Nirmal Munda was awarded a Tamrapatra (bronze plaque) as a freedom fighter by Indira Gandhi in 1972. The Tribals have placed a memorial stone at Simko and every year on 25 April pay their floral tribute to the victims of the massacre. Odisha State government has given the Amko Simko massacre site a tourism status. The memorial built at the Simko field is unmaintained and lacks facilities. The local tribals aren't satisfied with this work as this incident is gradually being forgotten and has been left out of history books.

== In popular culture ==
Amko Simko Po'dāte is a tribal folk song in Khadia language which describes the massacre in a song.

== See also ==
- Jallianwala Bagh massacre
- Patharighat massacre
- List of massacres in India

== Notes ==
There is debate on the issue of whether to treat this incident as an agrarian movement or a movement as a part of the Indian independence movement. The Odisha District Gazetteers mention the Amko Simko firing as an "agrarian agitation which was later eulogized by the Congress leaders as examples of bravery and valiant resistance by the tribals to the oppressive British Raj in order to inspire them to join the freedom movement".

Due to inconsistent documentation, varying data has been retrieved from sources on the same incident. Some sources mention the political agent's name with different spellings such as E. W. M. Morger. The number of casualties is also unclear as some reports mention the body-count as 28, some mention it as high as 300.
