= Adi Vaani =

Tribal translator tool

Adi Vaani is a large language model-based translator tool developed around tribal languages in India. It was launched on 1 September 2025 by the Ministry of Tribal Affairs and provides translation services for four languages: Gondi, Bhili, Mundari, and Santali.

Adi Vaani is billed as a means of preserving Adivasi heritage while improving access to education, healthcare, and civil services.
