= National Tribal Dance Festival =

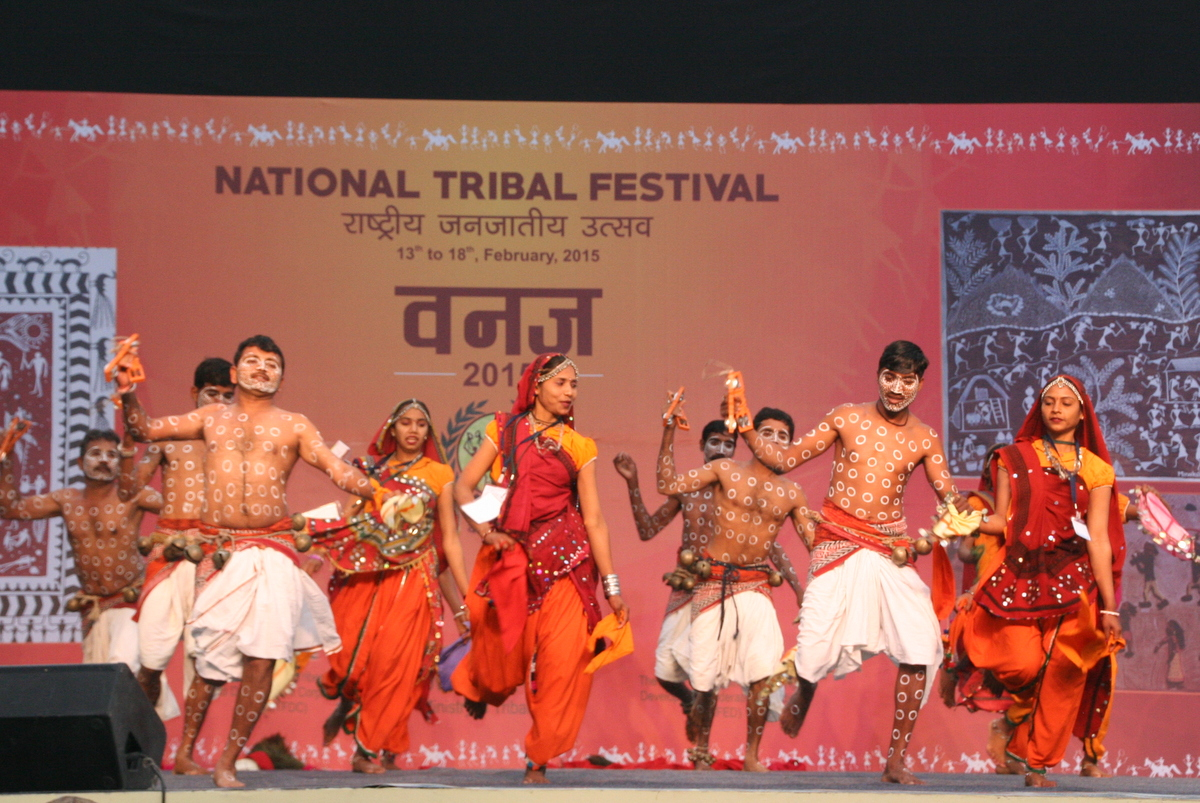
During National Tribal Dance Festival

The National Tribal Dance Festival is an annual festival celebrated by the aborigines and tribal of India in the National Capital Region, of India i.e. New Delhi. This Tribal Dance Festival annually during the month of December. It is organised by Ministry of Tribal Affairs, Government of India in collaboration with IGRMS, Bhopal, Madhya Pradesh.

== The festival ==
The festival is used to mark the dances of Adivasi and tribal people in India and their indigenous tribal dance culture.

== See also ==
- National Tribal Festival
