= Bartoli, Odisha =

Coordinates: 24°08′N 84°40′E

Bartoli
- village
- Location in Odisha, India Bartoli (India)
- Country: India
- State: Odisha
- District: Sundergarh
- Tehsil: Kuarmunda
- Elevation: 200 m (660 ft)

Languages
  - Official: Odia
- Time zone: UTC+5:30 (IST)
- Telephone code: 0661
- Vehicle registration: OD
- Lok Sabha constituency: Sundargarh
- Website: odisha.gov.in

Bartoli is a village in Kuarmunda tehsil of Sundargarh district, Odisha in the state of India. The village is under Bandamunda police station.

== Geography ==
Sundargarh, the district headquarters, is about 91 kilometres (57 mi) east of the village. Bartoli is one of the smaller villages in Odisha. The state capital Bhubaneswar is located about 292 kilometres (181 mi) from the village. The village is located between the major cities of Odisha namely Rourkella, Biramitrapur, Rajagangapur and Simdega.

== History ==
Bartoli was a tribal village inhabited by schedule castes and schedule tribes of Odisha before Indian Independence. Later in 1957, tradesman Amarnath Mishra migrated from Allahabad and developed a horse trading centre. He later turned the business into a dairy farm (locally known as Mishra Khatal). By his efforts, Bartoli was connected with the nearest city Rourkela.

== Present ==
By 2000, people from Rourkela started settling in the village considering it an extension of the expansion of the city. By that time the temporary village huts were changed into urban permanent houses, and new settlers moved in from nearby states, including Jharkhand, West Bengal, Bihar and Chhattisgarh. Kuarmunda railway station (12 kilometres (7.5 mi) from the village) is the nearest rail communication system of this remote area.

Bartoli does not fall under the Rourkela Municipal Corporation sector.

Anganwadi is the only government administrated primary school for the people of the village. A private higher education system has also been introduced for the people since 2004. Still, many of the people are unable to read and write.

In 2013, about 90 people live in the village, and many are labourers.

In 2023, although still not as developed as the other areas of Rourkela, Bartoli is developing rapidly, with many people moving into the said area.

=== Languages ===
Oriya is the most extensively spoken local Language of Bartoli.
