= Kharsawan massacre =

1948 Indian massacre

Kharsawan Massacre
- Location: Kharsawan State, Dominion of India (now in Seraikela Kharsawan, Jharkhand)
- Date: 1 January 1948
- Target: Adivasi protesters
- Attack type: Mass murder
- Deaths: 35 (official figure)
- Perpetrator: Orissa Military Police

The Kharsawan massacre (1 January 1948) was a massacre of Adivasis by the Orissa Military Police in erstwhile Kharsawan State in the newly independent Dominion of India, in what is now Jharkhand, India.

Police fired on a crowd of around 50,000 mostly Adivasi civilians in the market of Kharsawan, many of whom had gathered there to protest against the accession of the princely state to India in favor of a separate Adivasi state within India. There is no consensus over the number of casualties. The Orissa government declared 35 deaths.

The BJP regimes have commemorated this event to honour the tribals who were killed in the incident. The current Jharkhand CM Hemant Soren has promised to provide jobs to the families of the people killed.

== See also ==
- Amko Simko massacre
