= National Scheduled Tribes Finance and Development Corporation =

Indian nonprofit

National Scheduled Tribes Finance and Development Corporation (NSTFDC) is an apex organization setup exclusively for economic development of Scheduled Tribes. This corporation was incorporated as a Govt. Company under the Ministry of Tribal Affairs (MoTA) and granted license under Section 25 of the Companies Act, 1956 (now Section 8 of the Companies Act, 2013). It is managed by the board of directors with representation from Central Govt., State Channelizing Agencies, NABARD, IDBI Bank, Tribal Co-operative Marketing Development Federation of India Ltd. (TRIFED) and eminent persons representing Scheduled Tribes. The Corporation plays a leading role in economic upliftment of Scheduled Tribes by providing financial assistance at concessional rates of interest through its channelizing agencies.

== Mission ==
Socio-Economic Development of Scheduled Tribes on sustainable basis.

== Objective ==
Objectives of NSTFDC are:

- To identify economic activities of importance for Scheduled Tribes so as to generate self-employment and raise their level of income.
- To upgrade skills and process used by the Scheduled Tribes by providing both institutional and on the job training.
- To make the existing State/ UT Scheduled Tribes Finance and Development Corporations (SCAs) and other developmental agencies engaged in the economic development of Scheduled Tribes more effective.
- To assist SCAs in project formulation, implementation of NSTFDC assisted schemes and in imparting training to their personnel.
- To monitor implementation of NSTFDC assisted schemes in order to assess their impact.

== Functions ==
- To generate awareness amongst the STs about NSTFDC concessional schemes.
- To provide assistance for skill development and capacity building of beneficiaries as well as officials of SCAs.
- To provide concessional finance for viable income generation scheme through SCAs and other agencies for socio-economic development of eligible Scheduled Tribes.
- To assist in market linkage of tribal produce.

== Board of Directors ==
NSTFDC is managed by the board of directors with representation from Central Govt., State Channelizing Agencies, NABARD, IDBI Bank, Tribal Co-operative Marketing Development Federation of India Ltd. (TRIFED) and eminent persons representing Scheduled Tribes.

Name of Director	Designation
T. Roumuan Paite	Chairman-cum-Managing Director, National Scheduled Tribes Finance and Development Corporation
Brij Nandan Prasad	Joint Secretary, Ministry of Tribal Affairs
Yatinder Prasad	Joint Secretary & Financial Advisor, Ministry of Tribal Affairs
Nabin Kumar Roy	General Manager, NABARD
Deepika Kispotta	Dy. General Manager, IDBI Bank

== Schemes ==
NSTFDC provides financial assistance for income generation activities and marketing support assistance for economic upliftment of Scheduled Tribes. The details of schemes are as under:

=== Term Loan Scheme ===
NSTFDC provides Term Loan for viable projects costing up to ₹50.00 lakh per unit. Under the scheme, financial assistance is extended up to 90% of the cost of the project and the balance is met by way of subsidy / promoter contribution / margin money.

=== Adivasi Mahila Sashaktikaran Yojana (AMSY) ===
This is an exclusive scheme for economic development of Scheduled Tribes Women. Under the scheme, NSTFDC, provides loan up to 90% for projects costing up to ₹2.00 lakh. Financial assistance under the scheme is extended at highly concessional rate of interest of 4% per annum.

=== Micro Credit Scheme for Self Help Groups (MCF) ===
This is an exclusive scheme for Self Help Groups for meeting small loan requirement of ST member. Under the scheme, the Corporation provides loans up to ₹50,000/- per member and maximum ₹ 5 lakh per self-help group (SHG).

=== Adivasi Shiksha Rrinn Yojana (ASRY) ===
This is an Education loan scheme to enable the ST students to meet expenditure for pursuing technical and professional education including Ph.D. in India. Under this scheme, the Corporation provides financial assistance up to ₹10.00 lakh per eligible family at concessional rate of interest of 6% per annum.

=== Tribal Forest Dwellers Empowerment Scheme ===
The objective of the scheme is to generate awareness, provide training to beneficiaries, give NSTFDC's concessional financial assistance, assist in market linkage etc. to the Scheduled Tribes forest dwellers vested land rights under Forest Rights Act, 2006. Under the scheme, NSTFDC provides loan up to 90% for schemes costing up to ₹2 lakh at concessional rate of interest of 4% p.a. payable by the beneficiaries.

=== Margin Money Support Scheme for ST Entrepreneurs ===
Under this scheme, the eligible ST Entrepreneurs are allowed to avail financial assistance of NSTFDC to the extent of 15% of the total project cost under Stand-Up India Scheme.
