= Rajgangpur =

- Town
- Location in Odisha, India Rajgangpur (India)
- Coordinates: 22.20°N 84.583°E
- Country: India
- State: Odisha
- District: Sundargarh

Government
  - Type: Municipality

Area
  - Total: 27 km^{2} (10 sq mi)
- Elevation: 237 m (778 ft)

Population (2011)
  - Total: 51,362
  - Density: 1,900/km^{2} (4,900/sq mi)

Languages
  - Official: Odia
- Time zone: UTC+5:30 (IST)
- PIN: 770017
- Area code: +91-06624
- Vehicle registration: OD-16
- Lok Sabha constituency: Sundargarh
- Vidhan Sabha constituency: Rajgangpur (ST) Assembly Constituency
- Website: odisha.gov.in

Rajgangpur is an industrial town in the Sundargarh district in the Indian state of Odisha, about 400 km to the north-west of the state capital Bhubaneswar, 38 km west of Rourkela, and 63 km east of the district headquarters Sundargarh.

== History ==
Rajgangpur derived its name from the erstwhile princely state of Gangpur. This town was transferred from Commissioner of Chhotanagpur to Odisha division in the year 1905. Industrialization started in Rajgangpur with Dalmia Group setting up a cement plant in 1951.

== Industry ==
Rajgangpur is a major industrial town alongside Rourkela in Sundargarh district. It is home to OCL Industrial Township where cement plants and other factories owned by Dalmia Bharat, Ltd. the flagship company of Dalmia Group are located. The cement plants are the largest owned by Dalmia. The Rourkela-Rajgangpur industrial belt has most of the large, medium and small scale industrial units in the Sundargarh district.

== Demographics ==
As of the 2011 India Rajgangpur had a population of 51,362 of which 26,259 are males while 25,103 are females. Rajgangpur has an average literacy rate of 84.32%, higher than the state average of 72.87%. In Rajagangpur, Male literacy is around 89.38 % while female literacy rate is 79.07 %. In Rajgangpur, 12.41% of the population is under 6 years of age.

The main language spoken by the inhabitants of this town are Oriya, Sambalpuri, Hindi, Urdu, Sadri. The main source of job creation in the town are the industries in and around the town.

== Education ==
Major educational institutions in Rajgangpur include Dalmia College (Affiliated to Sambalpur University), Dalmia Vidya Mandir (CBSE), Saraswati Vidya Mandir (CBSE), Rashtriya Vidyalaya (Odisha Board), and Nirmala Higher Secondary School (ICSE), which together serve the academic needs of the region.

== Transportation ==
Rajgangpur Railway Station connects Rajgangpur to rest of the country. There are frequent buses from Rajgangpur to Bhubaneswar, Rourkela and Sundergarh. The nearest airport is Veer Surendra Sai Airport in Jharsuguda which is 95 km from Rajgangpur. Rajgangpur is connected by national highway NH 143, NH 320D, and Biju Expressway.

== Tribals ==
Rajgangpur has a large tribal population, dominated by Kisan, Gond, Oraons, Munda, Kharias and other tribals. Their main occupation is farming. The tribals also work in nearby factories and also hold a lot of government jobs. The tribal men and women are hardworking and they enjoy singing and dancing using Mandar, Dholki, Nagra and Muhuri. Education, medical facilities, clean drinking water and social justice are of major concern to the tribals, as they have scant access to these resources.

== Politics ==
Current MLA from Rajgangpur (ST) Assembly Constituency is Rajeen Ekka of INC, who won the seat in State elections in 2024 and 2019. Previous MLAs from this seat include Gregory Minz of INC who won in 2004 and 2009, Mangala Kisan who won this seat representing BJD in 2000, 2014 and representing JD in 1995, 1990 and representing JNP in 1985, Mukharam Naik of INC(I) in 1980 and Brajamohan Kishan of JNP in 1977. Rajgangpur is part of Sundargarh (Lok Sabha constituency).
