= National Tribal Festival =

National Tribal Festival VANAJ
- Genre: Tribes of India
- Dates: Mid of February every year
- Frequency: Annually
- Locations: New Delhi, India
- Years active: 2015— present

The National Tribal Festival is celebrated by the aborigines & tribal of India in the National Capital Region, of India i.e. New Delhi. The festival is celebrated in the mid of the month of February every year. It is organised by the Ministry of Tribal Affairs, Government of India.

== The festival ==
The festival is used to mark the Adivasi & tribal people in India and their indigenous tribal culture.

=== “Vanaj”-National Tribal Festival-2015 ===
The first edition of the National Tribal Festival was held in New Delhi from 13 to 18 February 2015.

== See also ==
- National Tribal Dance Festival
