= BISRA (disambiguation) =

BISRA may refer to:

- British Iron and Steel Research Association, a metals technology industry research group in England.
- Bantry Inshore Search and Rescue Association, a registered charity providing emergency lifeboat service in Bantry Bay.
- Bisra road, a public road in Rourkela, Orissa, India.
- Bisra Assembly constituency, a former assembly constituency of the Odisha Legislative Assembly, India.
