= Subrat Tarai =

Indian politician

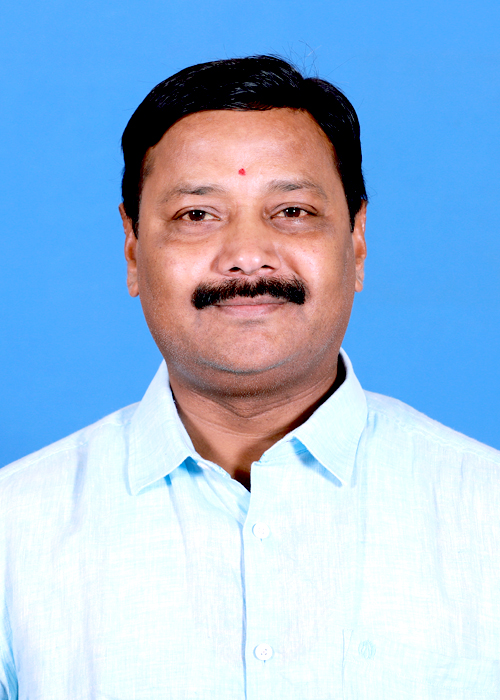
- Official Mla Portrait Of 2014

Member of Odisha Legislative Assembly
- In office 2009–2024
- Preceded by: Halu Mundari
- Succeeded by: Durga Charan Tanti
- Constituency: Raghunathpali

Minister Of Odisha Govt.
- In office 2 August 2012 – 20 May 2014

Personal details
- Party: Biju Janata Dal
- Profession: Politician

Subrat Tarai (born 1971) is an Indian politician from Odisha. He was a three time elected Member of the Odisha Legislative Assembly from 2009, representing Raghunathpali Assembly constituency as a Member of the Biju Janata Dal.

He was denied a ticket by BJD and his wife Archana Rekha Behera was nominated to contest the 2024 Odisha Legislative Assembly election. She lost to the BJP candidate, Durga Charan Tanti.

== Early life and education ==
Tarai is from Raghunathpali, Rourkela district, Odisha. He is the son of Laxmidhar Tarai. He completed his MSc in agriculture in 1995 at Odisha University of Agriculture and Technology (OUAT), Bhubaneswar. Earlier, he did BSc (agriculture) in 1992 at OUAT, Chipilima. He passed HSC at Ispat Vidyalaya, Sector -18, Rourkela in 1985.

== See also ==
- 2019 Odisha Legislative Assembly election
- Odisha Legislative Assembly
