= Nirmal Munda =

Indian politician and veteran (1893–1973)

Member of Second Odisha Legislative Assembly
- In office 1957–1961
- Preceded by: Madan Mohan Amat
- Succeeded by: Premchand Bhagat
- Constituency: Bisra (ST)

Personal details
- Born: 1893 Bartoli, Gangpur
- Died: 2 January 1973 (aged 79–80) Bartoli, Odisha, India
- Party: Independent
- Profession: World War I veteran, Agrarian leader, Freedom fighter, Politician

Nirmal Munda (1893 - 2 January 1973) was an Indian agrarian leader, a freedom fighter and a World War I veteran. He was the leader of the Munda agitation of 1937–39, who organised the tribals of Gangpur to refuse to pay exorbitant taxes and demanded khuntkatti rights.

== Early life ==
Munda was born in 1893 in Bartoli village in the former princely state of Gangpur (now in Sundergarh district, Odisha) in the Munda family of father Marha Munda and mother Gomi Munda. He received lower primary education at Bartoli. For his upper primary education, he went to Rajgangpur. After completion of upper primary education, he went to Karanjo (now in Jharkhand) for middle education. After that, in 1917, he went to Ranchi GEL Church High School. While studying in high school, he was recruited by the British Army and left for France on 17 November 1917, during the First World War. He returned to Bartoli in July 1919.

== Munda agitation in Gangpur ==
Between 1929 and 1935, the land revenue settlement of Gangpur increased at alarming rates. The Upendranath Ghosh settlement (1929-1931) followed by the Indrabilas Mukherjee settlement (1932-1935) marks the beginning of tribal discontent. The Mukherjee settlement of 1932 did allow the uplands to be left from assessment in exchange of bethi and begari ( forced labour services without pay to the state by the tenant). Later it was realised that the practice of bethi and begari was only used for minor road repairs. Bethi and begari were often misused and oppressive to the tribals as they would be forced to leave their work during busy times. In 1936, the system of leaving uplands from rent assessment in exchange for bethi and begari was discontinued; now all lands were assessed to rent. This was the major reason behind tribal discontent.

The Munda tribals of Dahijira village refused to pay rent and others supported them. The Mundas filed several petitions before the viceroy protesting the exorbitant taxes. In 1938, Nirmal Munda organised the tribals of the region to stop paying taxes. Inspired by Jaipal Singh, Nirmal Munda organised the tribals to stop paying taxes and demanded reduction of rent, He also demanded khuntkhatti rights and the abolition of bethi and begari. The agitation spread throughout Gangpur.

The darbar (royal court) found it almost impossible to collect tax. Criminal cases were started and warrants were issued against some of the agitators. These coercive measures did not stop the movement, Nirmal Munda made covert meetings at secret locations with the agitators. The queen of Gangpur sought help of the political agent at Sambalpur to suppress the agitation by arresting Nirmal Munda.

=== Amko Simko massacre ===
It was given out that the queen had accepted the agitators demands and was going to declare good news at Simko village (where Nirmal Munda had a residence). On 25 April 1939, thousands of tribals had gathered at the Amko Simko field under the leadership of Nirmal Munda. The queen, along with political agent Lt. E. W. Marger and two platoons of troops appeared at the field with the sole intention to arrest Nirmal Munda on charges of holding seditious meetings and assaulting a village chawkidar.

According to Fabianus Ekka - the queen asked, "Who is Nirmal Munda?" The crowd recognised the evil intention of the queen and introduced themselves as Nirmal Munda. Soon, scuffles broke out and the crowd armed with lathis, axes and other crude weapons resisted the arrest of their leader. The police, finding the situation unfavorable, opened fire upon the crowd. This led to the death of 49 and injured many. The dead bodies were given a mass burial at Brahmanmaara. Some sources suggest that the number of deaths were higher.

Nirmal Munda was arrested and sentenced to six years of imprisonment at Sundergarh and Sambalpur, but was only released from jail on 15 August 1947. With the arrest of Nirmal Munda, the agitation came to an end.

== Praja Mandal movement in Gangpur ==
Dhananjaya Mohanty, a congress leader and a freedom fighter from Gangpur, who had also worked in the Munda agitation, once tried to persuade the tribal leaders of Gangpur to form a Praja Mandal (people's association). Nirmal Munda was not interested in the Praja Mandal movement and wanted to fight for their cause with a separate identity.

== After independence ==
Nirmal Munda contested the Odisha State Assembly elections in 1957 as an independent candidate from Bisra (ST) constituency and won. He was awarded tamra patra (bronze plaque) by the then Prime Minister Indira Gandhi in 1972, recognising him as a freedom fighter. He died in Bartoli on 2 January 1973.

== After death ==
After his death, an obituary of Nirmal Munda was made in the Odisha legislative assembly on 29 March 1974. In 2017, family members of Nirmal were felicitated by Prime Minister Narendra Modi, honouring them.

=== Commemoration ===
- Proposed Statue of Nirmal Munda at Vedvyas Chowk
