= Kalo Chandramani =

Indian politician (born 1916)

Member of Parliament, Lok Sabha
- In office 1980–1984
- Preceded by: Sibnarayan Singh Mahapatra,
- Succeeded by: Yagnyanarayan Singha
- Constituency: Sundargarh, Odisha

Personal details
- Born: 28 March 1916 Kusumdegi, Sundargarh District, Orissa, British India
- Party: Ganatantra Parishad
- Spouse: Nirmayee Babi

Kalo Chandramani (born 28 March 1916) is an Indian politician. He was elected to the Lok Sabha, the lower house of the Parliament of India from Sundargarh, Odisha as a member of the Ganatantra Parishad.
