= Tribal Co-operative Marketing Federation of India =

Government agency

Tribal Co-operative Marketing Development Federation of India (TRIFED)
- भारतीय जनजातीय सहकारी विपणन विकास संघ

Agency overview
- Formed: 1987
- Headquarters: New Delhi
- Minister responsible: Jual Oram, Minister for Tribal Affairs
- Agency executives: Ramsinh Rathwa, Chairman; M. Raja Murugan, IPS, Managing Director
- Parent agency: Ministry of Tribal Affairs
- Website: https://trifed.tribal.gov.in/

Tribal Co-operative Marketing Development Federation of India (TRIFED) is a national level cooperative body under the administrative control of Ministry of Tribal Affairs, Government of India. It was established under the Multi-state co-operative societies act 1984 under the former Ministry of Welfare. Later it came under the control of Ministry of Tribal affairs. In order to empower the downtrodden tribal community it started the procurement of tribal art and craft items firstly in 1999 through its retail outlet called Tribes India.

== Mandate ==
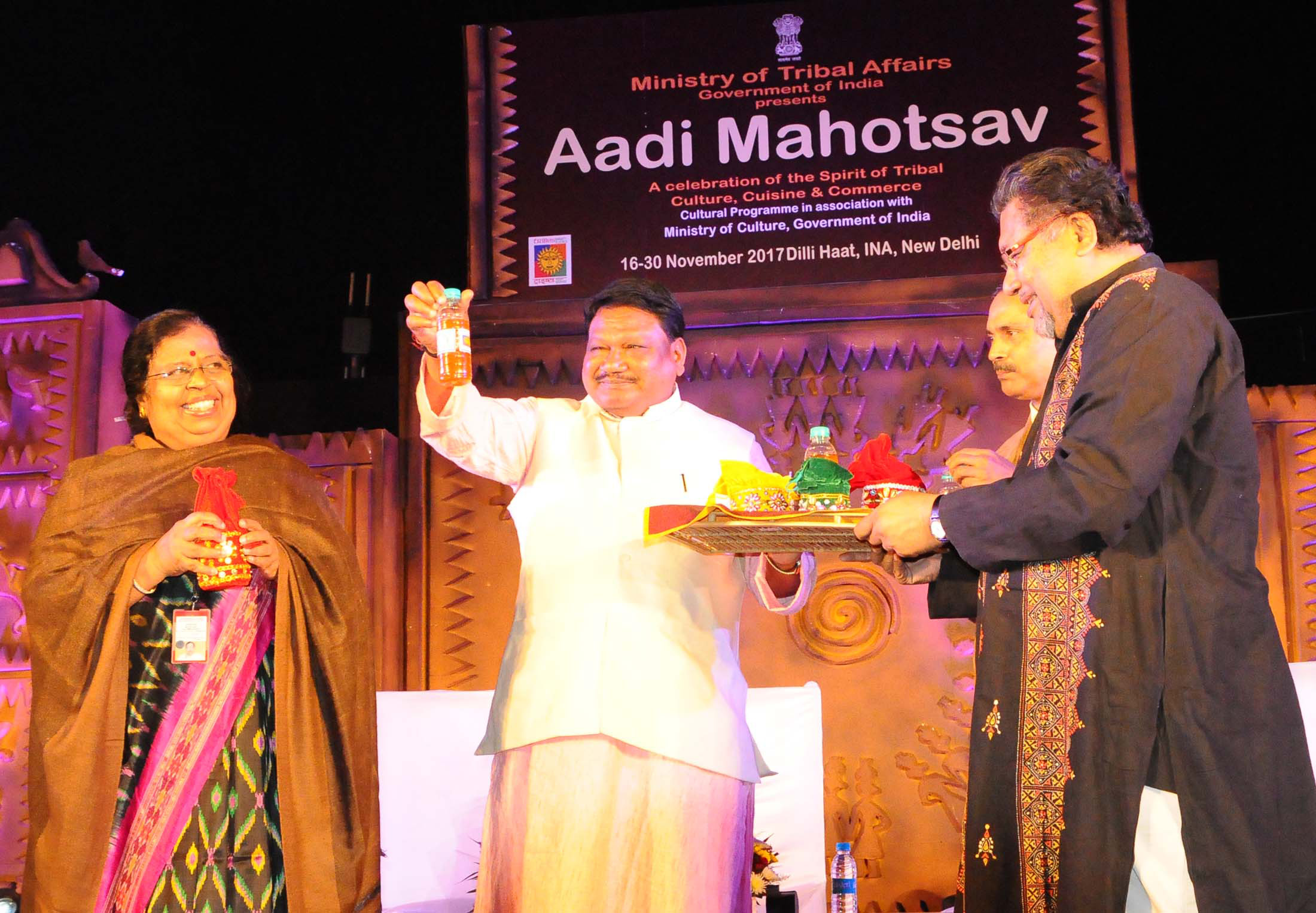
Former Minister for Tribal Affairs Jual Oram launching the TAM Squash – a non-alcoholic drink, developed by the TRIFED & IIT-Delhi.

TRIFED was formed with the main objective of institutionalising the trade of Minor forest products (MFP) and to provide the tribals of India a fair price for the surplus agricultural products produced by them. It was established in 1987 and became operational in 1988. It also fulfills other objectives as per its mandate as for example it ensures the sustainable harvesting of MFP. It also saves the tribals from the policies of middleman, who buy the MFP from them at cheap rates while providing it to the end users at higher rates. In case of fluctuations in the price of these MFPs, the mandate of TRIFED is to provide adequate compensation to the tribals through Ministry of Agriculture & Farmers' Welfare. It also provides information to the tribals about the fair price of their products and enables them to bargain for it. In order to support tribal art and craft it organises the tribal art and craft exhibition called "Aadi Mahotsav"; where tribal craft products from all over the country are exhibited and bought by the art lovers.

== Initiatives ==
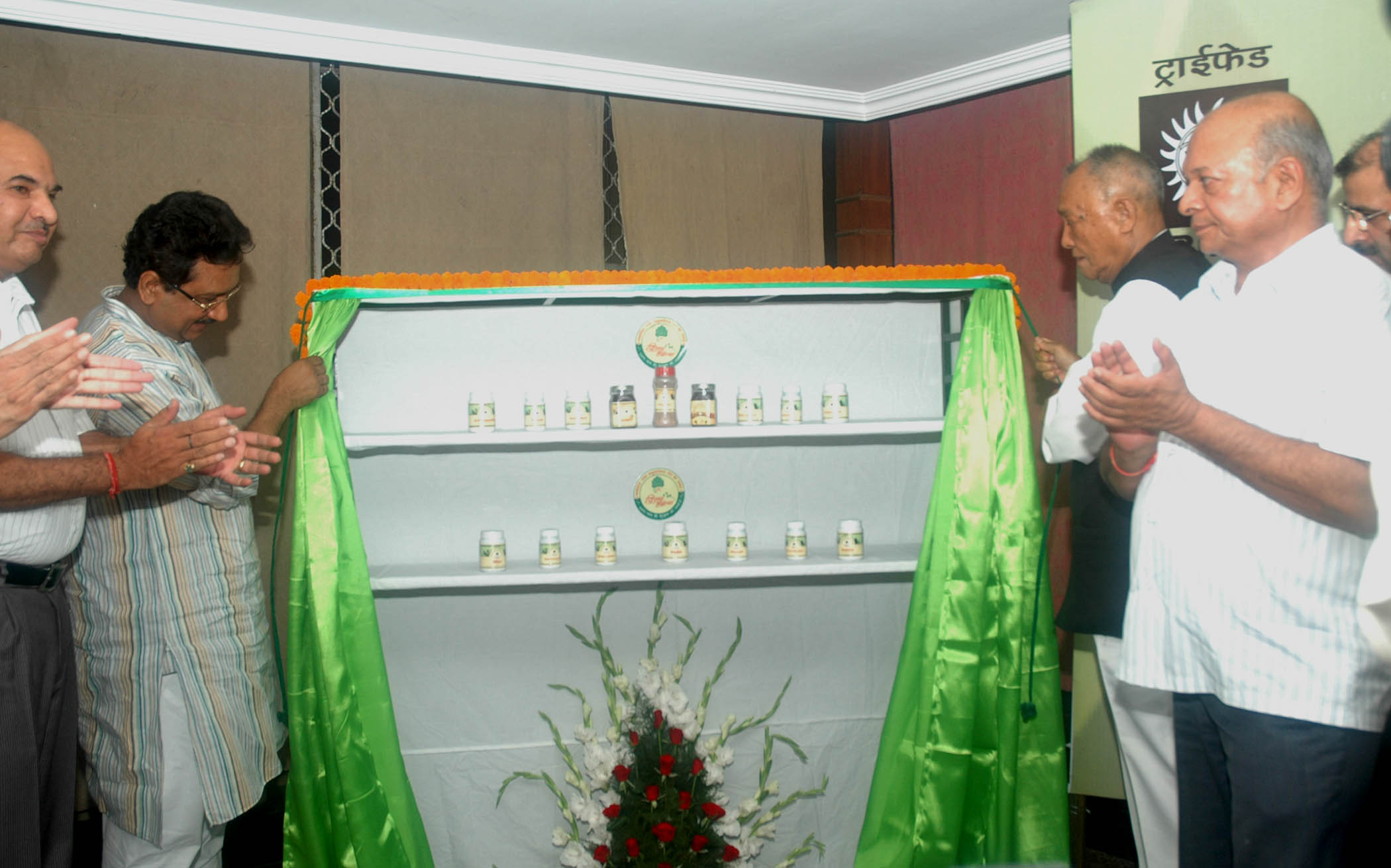
Former Minister of Tribal Affairs, P. R. Kyndiah launching the ‘Vindhya Herbals' herbal products by TRIFED, in New Delhi on 18 May 2008.

=== Van Dhan Yojna ===
Van Dhan Yojna was launched on 14 April 2018, initially as a pilot project in Bijapur; Chhattisgarh under which a Van Dhan Vikas Kendra was set up to cater ten Self Help Groups of thirty tribal gatherers each. Out of the total cost of twenty five lakhs which was spent to set it up 25% was met by state government. However; as per "TRIFED" each such Kendra will constitute 15 tribal Self Help Groups with 20 gatherers each making total number of beneficiary per Kendra to be 300.

The Ministry of Tribal Affairs with technical support from the TRIFED aimed to set up 30,000 such centres in the country with the basic motive of skill upgradation and capacity building of tribal gatherers as well as ensure marketability of their raw products by setting up primary processing and value addition facilities. As of June 2020, 1205 tribal enterprises employing 360,000 people through 18000 Self Help Group were established in the country. The scheme created some of the important success stories like that of Nagaland's Langleng district, where tribals used to sell their unique hill broom grass for just ₹7 per kg. But after being trained through the "Van Dhan Kendra" under Van Dhan Yojna, they managed to earn ₹60 per broom which enhanced their income.

The perishable nature of Non timber forest products made it difficult for tribal gatherers to make profit out of it, further the poor marketing infrastructure in tribal areas also made it difficult for them to have direct market access for their products. Considering these challenges the Ministry of Tribal Affairs and TRIFED launched the MSP for MFP scheme in 2013–14. In May 2020 the revised guidelines on the scheme were launched amidst COVID-19 crisis and 23 more Non-Timber forest products were added to the list of MFP to be procured by State implementing agency (SIA).

In the backdrop of "Van Dhan Yojna"; TRIFED along with the Ministry of Tribal Affairs and Ministry of Food Processing Industries launched the TRIFOOD project in August 2020. The scheme envisaged setting up of tertiary value addition units at Jagdalpur in Chhattisgarh and Raigad in Maharashtra for value addition of forest products in a bid to enhance the income of the tribals of catchment area.

=== Van Dhan Samajik Doori Jagrookta Abhiyaan ===
Amidst the COVID-19 crisis in 2020 TRIFED, launched this scheme in order to educate the tribals in COVID related safety measures. Nationwide and state specific webinars were organised in order to bring awareness on the issue. The Ministry of Tribal Affairs also revised Minimum Support Price (MSP) for Minor forest products (MFP) to be procured from the tribals under MSP for MFP scheme meanwhile promoting door to door procurement and sale through mobile vans. The program was launched in association with UNICEF.

=== Tech for Tribals scheme ===
TRIFED with the support from Ministry of Micro, Small and Medium Enterprises launched the "Tech for Tribal" scheme in March 2020. It aims to impart the training to tribal forest product gatherers through a 30 day course developed by the higher educational institutions like IITs. The partner institutions will develop courses relevant to entrepreneurship in value addition and processing of Minor forest products. The scheme will empower the tribal entrepreneurs to run their business with marketable products having quality certification.

== See also ==
- Ministry of Animal Husbandry, Dairying and Fisheries
- Department of Animal husbandry and Dairying
