= Jual Oram =

Indian politician (born 1961)

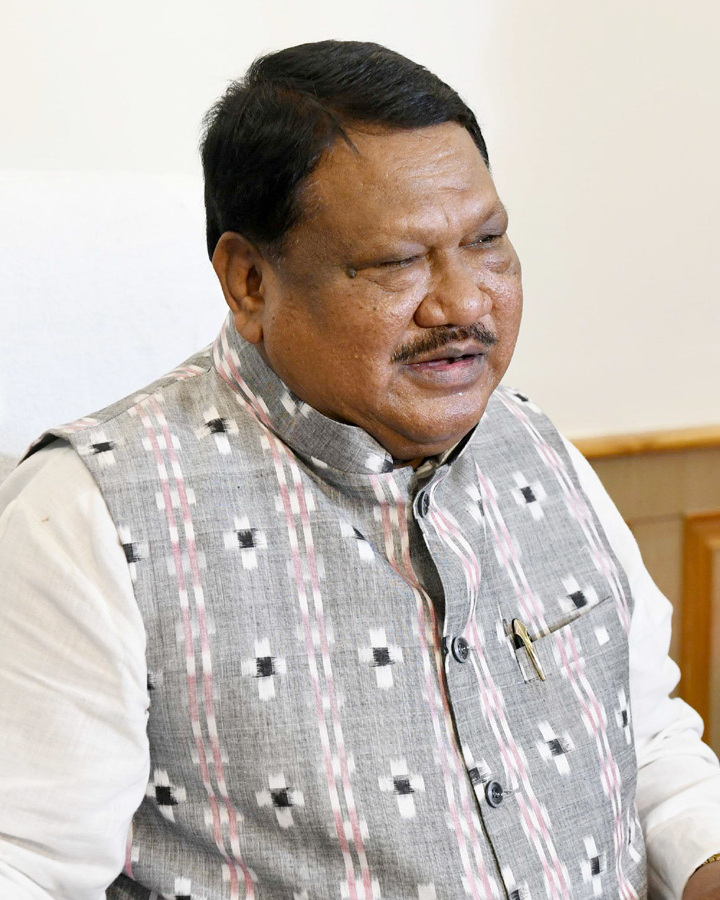
- Oram in 2024

Union Minister of Tribal Affairs
- Incumbent
- Assumed office 10 June 2024
- President: Droupadi Murmu
- Prime Minister: Narendra Modi
- Preceded by: Arjun Munda
- In office 26 May 2014 – 24 May 2019
- Prime Minister: Narendra Modi
- Preceded by: Kishore Chandra Deo
- Succeeded by: Arjun Munda
- In office 13 October 1999 – 22 May 2004
- Prime Minister: Atal Bihari Vajpayee
- Preceded by: office established
- Succeeded by: Paty Ripple Kyndiah

Member of Parliament, Lok Sabha
- Incumbent
- Assumed office 26 May 2014
- Preceded by: Hemananda Biswal
- Constituency: Sundargarh, Odisha
- In office 10 March 1998 – 18 May 2009
- Preceded by: Frida Topno
- Succeeded by: Hemananda Biswal
- Constituency: Sundargarh, Odisha

Member Of Odisha Legislative Assembly
- In office 1990–1998
- Preceded by: Basanta Singh Dandapat
- Succeeded by: Janardan Dehury
- Constituency: Bonai

State President Of Bjp Odisha
- In office 18 May 1997 – 14 November 1999
- Preceded by: Debendra Pradhan
- Succeeded by: Manmohan Samal
- In office 18 May 2004 – 7 November 2006
- Preceded by: Manmohan Samal
- Succeeded by: Suresh Pujari
- In office 22 December 2009 – 10 March 2013
- Preceded by: Suresh Pujari
- Succeeded by: Kanak Vardhan Singh Deo

Personal details
- Born: 22 March 1961 (age 65) Sundargarh, Odisha, India
- Party: Bharatiya Janata Party
- Spouse: Jhingia Oram (m. 1987; died 2024)
- Children: 2
- Parents: Late Shri Teria Dilga Oram(father); Late Bhutki Oram (mother)
- Occupation: Politician

Jual Oram (born 22 March 1961) is an Indian Politician who is serving as the 7th Minister of Tribal Affairs since 2024. He also Member of the 17th Lok Sabha of India. He represents the Sundargarh constituency of Odisha. He is a member of the Bharatiya Janata Party (BJP).

He was also a member of the 12th, 13th, 14th Lok Sabha and 16th Lok Sabha. He was chosen as one of the Cabinet Ministers of Prime Minister Narendra Modi. He is a former Cabinet Minister in the Government of India. He is now the Vice-President of the Bharatiya Janata Party and is one of the party's senior most leaders from the State of Odisha, being one of two founding Legislative Assembly Members from BJP in the state of Odisha. He has served as the president of BJP in the state of Odisha for over four years. He served as leader of opposition party from BJP side in Odisha legislative assembly. He is now serving as the chairman of the parliamentary committee on defence.

== Early life ==
Oram was born on 22 March 1961 into a Oraon tribal family at the village of Kendudihi, Sundergarh district, Orissa (present-day Odisha) to Dilga and Bhutuki Oram. He received a diploma in Electrical Engineering from Utkalmani Gopabandhu Institute of Engineering. Before entering politics, he was employed as an assistant foreman in Bharat Heavy Electricals Limited. In an interview to The Telegraph (Calcutta), Oram said that he would have continued his job in the organization if he had not entered politics.

== Political career ==
In 1989, Oram joined Bharatiya Janata Party. He was elected to the Odisha Legislative Assembly from Bonai constituency in the following year and served for two terms until 1998. He served as the party's national vice-president for the BJP ST Morcha (Scheduled Tribes wing) between 1993 and 1995. After serving two years as national secretary of the party, he was appointed party president for the state unit in 1997 and remained in that position until 1999.

In 1998, Oram was elected to the Lok Sabha from Sundargarh constituency. He was re-elected to the parliament in the following year. After Prime Minister Atal Bihari Vajpayee created the Ministry of Tribal Affairs, he was sworn as its first ever minister on 13 October. In 2004, Oram was re-elected as party president for the state unit and served for two years. On 17 May of the same year, he was re-elected to the Lok Sabha for the third time from his constituency. From 2006 to 2009, he served as the party's national vice-president.

Oram lost from his Sundargarh constituency in 2009. On 22 December 2009, he was made the party president of the state unit for the third time. In July 2012, he alleged that former Chief Minister of Odisha Hemananda Biswal had forged his caste certificate. On 1 April 2013, he was appointed vice president of the party.

On 18 May 2014, Oram was re-elected to the Lok Sabha from the Sundargarh constituency after defeating Dilip Tirkey of the Biju Janata Dal. He was also the only candidate of Bharatiya Janata Party to win from Odisha. On 26 May, he took oath as the Tribal Affairs minister in the Narendra Modi ministry. In the following month, he announced that the central government would create a tribal map of India which would help in introducing new projects and schemes for the tribals.

In 2015, Oram stoked a controversy by equating Sarnaism with Hinduism. Carrying black flags and banners, nearly 300 tribals gathered around the state guesthouse in Ranchi on 31 October and demanded an apology from him for allegedly hurting their sentiments.

== Criminal case ==
He is facing a pending criminal case that includes a charge related to a crime against women.

== Positions held ==
09-Jun-2024 - Union Cabinet Minister of Tribal Affairs

June 2024 Elected to 18th Lok Sabha

21 Nov. 2019 onwards Member, General Purposes Committee, Lok Sabha

13 Sept. 2019 onwards Chairperson, Standing Committee on Defence

May 2019 Re-elected to 17th Lok Sabha (5th Term)

27 May 2014 - 25 May 2019 Union Cabinet Minister, Tribal Affairs

May 2014 Re-elected to 16th Lok Sabha (4th Term)

2012 - 2014 National Vice-President and Member, Central Election Committee, B.J.P.

2009 - 2011 President, Odisha State, B.J.P. (3rd Term)

2006 - 2009 National Vice-President, B.J.P.

5 Aug. 2007 Member, Standing Committee on Social Justice & Empowerment

Member, Committee on Welfare of Scheduled Castes and Scheduled Tribes

Member, Standing Committee on Social Justice and Empowerment

2004 Re-elected to 14th Lok Sabha( 3rd Term)

2004 - 2006 President, Odisha State, B.J.P. (2nd Term)

13 Oct. 1999 - May 2004 Union Cabinet Minister, Tribal Affairs 1999 Re-elected to 13th Lok Sabha (2nd Term)

Member, Consultative Committee, Ministry of Coal

Member, Standing Committee on Industry

1998-99 Member, Committee on Official Language

Whip, B.J.P. Parliamentary Party (Odisha Group), Lok Sabha

1998 Elected to 12th Lok Sabha

1997 - 99 President, Odisha State, B.J.P.

1995 - 97 National Secretary, B.J.P.

1993 - 95 National Vice-President, S.T. Morcha, B.J.P.

1991 - 93 District Vice-President, B.J.P., Sundargarh, Odisha

1990-98 Member, Odisha Legislative Assembly (Two Terms)

1989 Joined Bharatiya Janata Party (B.J.P.)

== Personal life ==
On 8 March 1987, he married Jhingia Oram and they have two daughters. His wife Jhingia Oram died on 17 August 2024 of dengue at age of 58.

== See also ==
- Indian general election, 2014 (Odisha)
- Indian general election, 2009 (Odisha)
- Sundargarh Lok Sabha constituency
- Sundargarh District

Lok Sabha
Preceded by Frida Topno	Member of Parliament for Sundargarh; 1998–2009	Succeeded by Hemananda Biswal
Preceded by Hemananda Biswal	Member of Parliament for Sundargarh; 2014 – Present	Succeeded by Incumbent
Political offices
Preceded by Kishore Chandra Deo	Minister of Tribal Affairs; 26 May 2014 – 30 May 2019	Succeeded by Arjun Munda
