= Rajgangpur railway station =

Railway station in India

Rajgangpur

General information
- Location: Rajgangpur, Odisha; India
- Coordinates: 22°11′12″N 84°35′02″E
- System: Indian Railways station
- Owner: Ministry of Railways, Indian Railways
- Line: Tatanagar–Bilaspur section
- Platforms: 3
- Tracks: 6

Construction
- Structure type: Standard (on ground)
- Parking: No

Other information
- Status: Functioning
- Station code: GP
- Zone(s): South Eastern Railway
- Division(s): Chakradharpur
Location
- Location within India Location within Odisha

Rajgangpur railway station is a railway station on the South Eastern Railway network in the state of Odisha, India. It serves Rajgangpur town. Its code is GP. It has three platforms and six tracks (three tracks between platform 1 and 2 and three tracks between platform 3 and exit). Express and Passenger trains halt at Rajgangpur railway station.

== Major trains ==
- Shalimar–Lokmanya Tilak Terminus Express
- Dhanbad–Alappuzha Express
- Howrah–Ahmedabad Superfast Express
- Rourkela–Bhubaneswar Intercity Express
- Tapaswini Express
- Rourkela–Gunupur Rajya Rani Express
- Samaleshwari Express
- Ispat Express
- South Bihar Express
- Sambalpur–Jammu Tawi Express
- Kalinga Utkal Express
- Rourkela–Jagdalpur Express
- Sambalpur–Varanasi Express
- Azad Hind Express

== See also ==
- Sundergarh district
