= Rohit Joseph Tirkey =

Indian politician

Member of Odisha Legislative Assembly
- Incumbent
- Assumed office 4 June 2024
- Preceded by: Shankar Oram
- Constituency: Biramitrapur

Personal details
- Political party: Biju Janata Dal
- Profession: Politician

Rohit Joseph Tirkey (born 1989) is an Indian politician from Odisha. He is a Member of the Odisha Legislative Assembly. He won the 2024 Odisha Legislative Assembly election representing the Biju Janata Dal from Biramitrapur Assembly constituency, which is reserved for Scheduled Tribe community in Sundergarh District.

== Early life and education ==
Tirkey is from Raghunathpali, Sundergarh District, Odisha. He is the son of former MLA George Tirkey. He completed his Class 12 and did a certificate course as a Trade Machinist technician in Mechanical Engineering at Don Bisco, Luluah, Howrah, West Bengal.

== Career ==
Tirkey won from Biramitrapur Assembly constituency representing Biju Janata Dal in the 2024 Odisha Legislative Assembly election. He polled 84,116 votes and defeated his nearest rival, Shankar Oram of Bharatiya Janata Party, by a margin of 6,884 votes.

== See also ==
- 2024 Odisha Legislative Assembly election
- Odisha Legislative Assembly
