= Bonai Assembly constituency =

Assembly constituency in Odisha

Coordinates: 21.82°N 84.95°E

Bonai
- Constituency No. 14 for the Odisha Legislative Assembly
- Bonai Assembly constituency in Sundargarh district

Constituency details
- Country: India
- Region: East India
- State: Odisha
- Division: Northern Division
- District: Sundargarh
- Lok Sabha constituency: Sundargarh
- Established: 1951
- Total electors: 2,28,597 (Note: as on 2024) (Note: as data published by election commission)
- Reservation: ST

Member of Legislative Assembly
- 17th Odisha Legislative Assembly
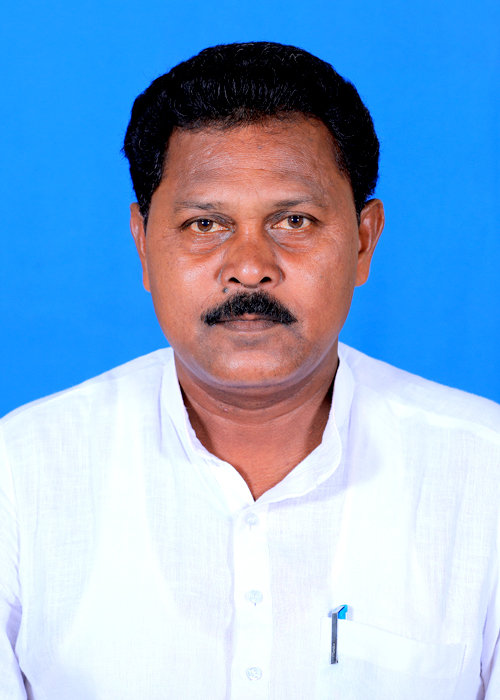
- Incumbent Laxman Munda
- Party: CPI(M)
- Elected year: 2024

Bonai is an Assembly constituency of Sundergarh district in Odisha State. It was established in 1951.

== Extent of Assembly Constituencies ==
- Gurundia Block
- Bonaigarh Block
- Lahunipara Block
- Koira Block.

== Members of the Legislative Assembly ==
Vote share of winning candidates
2024	43.45%
2019	34.67%
2014	23.98%
2009	23.97%
2004	40.17%
2000	43.53%
1998 (bypoll)	50.22%
1995	25.17%
1990	44.96%
1985	28.95%
1980	34.91%
1977	49.64%

Since its formation in 1951, 18 elections have been held till date including one bypoll in 1997.

List of members elected from Bonai constituency are:

Year	Member	Party
2024	Laxman Munda	Communist Party of India (Marxist)
2019	Laxman Munda	Communist Party of India (Marxist)
2014	Laxman Munda	Communist Party of India (Marxist)
2009	Bhimsen Choudhury	Bharatiya Janata Party
2004	Laxman Munda	Communist Party of India (Marxist)
2000	Dayanidhi Kisan	Bharatiya Janata Party
1998 (bypoll) (Note: Resignation of Jual Oram on his election to Lok Sabha)	Janardan Dehury	Indian National Congress
1995	Jual Oram	Bharatiya Janata Party
1990	Jual Oram	Bharatiya Janata Party
1985	Basanta Singh Dandapat	Indian National Congress
1980	Basanta Singh Dandapat	Indian National Congress (I)
1977	Hemanta Singh Dandapat	Janata Party
1974	Benudhar Naik	Indian National Congress
1971	Hemendra Prasad Mahapatra	Swatantra Party
1967	Hemendra Prasad Mahapatra	Swatantra Party
1961	Hemendra Prasad Mahapatra	Swatantra Party
1957	Arjun Naik	Ganatantra Parishad
1951	Nilamani Singh Dandapat	Ganatantra Parishad

== Election results ==
=== 2024 ===
Voting were held on 20 May 2024 in 2nd phase of Odisha Assembly Election & 5th phase of Indian General Election. Counting of votes was on 4 June 2024. In 2024 election, Communist Party of India (Marxist) candidate Laxman Munda defeated Biju Janata Dal candidate Bhimsen Choudhury by 23,439 votes.

2024 Vidhan Sabha Election: Bonai
Party	Candidate	Votes	%	±%
CPI(M)	Laxman Munda	81,008	43.45	▲8.78
BJD	Bhimsen Choudhury	57,569	30.88	▲3.17
BJP	Sebati Nayak	30,067	16.13	▼5.42
NOTA	None of the above	3126	1.68	▲0.12
Majority		23,439	12.57	
Turnout		1,86,429	81.55	
CPI(M) hold				

=== 2019 ===
In 2019 election, Communist Party of India (Marxist) candidate Laxman Munda defeated Biju Janata Dal candidate Ranjit Kishan by 12,030 votes.

2019 Vidhan Sabha Election, Bonai
Party	Candidate	Votes	%	±%
CPI(M)	Laxman Munda	59,939	34.67	▲10.69
BJD	Ranjit Kishan	47,909	27.71	▲4.85
BJP	Anil Kumar Barla	37,266	21.55	▲5.92
Independent	Janardan Dehury	11,722	6.78	−
NOTA	None of the above	2,699	1.56	▼0.77
Majority		12,030	6.94	
Turnout		1,72,903	78.24	
CPI(M) hold		Swing		

=== 2014 ===
In 2014 election, Communist Party of India (Marxist) candidate Laxman Munda defeated Biju Janata Dal candidate Dayanidhi Kisan by 1,818 votes.

2014 Vidhan Sabha Election, Bonai
Party	Candidate	Votes	%	±%
CPI(M)	Laxman Munda	39,125	23.98	▲2.65
BJD	Dayanidhi Kisan	37,307	22.86	−
INC	Bhimsen Choudhary	37,181	22.78	▲3.1
BJP	Luthar Oram	25,766	15.79	▼8.18
NOTA	None of the above	3,803	2.33	−
Majority		1,818	1.11	
Turnout		1,63,188	81.97	13.06
Registered electors		1,99,080		
CPI(M) gain from BJP				

=== 2009 ===
In 2009 election, Bharatiya Janata Party candidate Bhimsen Choudhury defeated Communist Party of India (Marxist) candidate Laxman Munda by 3,356 votes.

2009 Vidhan Sabha Election, Bonai
Party	Candidate	Votes	%	±%
BJP	Bhimsen Choudhury	30,495	23.97	−
CPI(M)	Laxman Munda	27,139	21.33	−
INC	Ranjit Kisan	25,046	19.68	−
Independent	Dayanidhi Kisan	18,154	14.27	−
Majority		3,356	2.64 (Note: %of total valid votes)	−
Turnout		1,27,319	68.91	−
BJP gain from CPI(M)				

=== 1961 ===
In 1961 election, Swatantra Party candidate Mohapatra Hemendra Prasad defeated Indian National Congress candidate Dandpat Hamanda Kumar Singh by 9,946 votes.

66-BONAI (ST) constituency, 1961 Odisha Legislative Assembly election
Party	Candidate	Votes	%	±%
SWA	Mohapatra Hemendra Prasad	12,816	71.85%	▲28.76
INC	Dandpat Hamanda Kumar Singh	2,870	15.58%	▲11.59
Jharkhand Party	Munda Lucas	2,242	12.57%	New
Majority		9,946		
Registered electors		58,707		Steady
Turnout		19,249	32.79	▼0.73
SWA gain from AIGP		Swing	▲28.76	

=== 1957 ===
In 1957 election, Ganatantra Parishad candidate Arjun Naik defeated Indian National Congress candidate Basant Kumar Dandpat by 3,071 votes.

45-BONAI (ST) constituency, 1957 Odisha Legislative Assembly election
Party	Candidate	Votes	%	±%
AIGP	Arjun Naik	8,165	43.09%	▼24.8
INC	Basant Kumar Dandpat	5,148	27.17%	▲7.4
Independent	Prabhusahay Munda	3,760	19.84%	New
Independent	Rudra Kisan	1,875	9.90%	▼2.24
Majority		3,071		
Registered electors		55,347		Steady
Turnout		18,948	33.52%	▲0.13
AIGP hold		Swing	▼24.8	

=== 1952 ===
In 1952 election, Ganatantra Parishad candidate Nilamani Singh Dandapat defeated Indian National Congress candidate Balaram Mohapatra by 8,891 votes.

39-BONAI (ST) constituency, 1952 Orissa Legislative Assembly election
Party	Candidate	Votes	%	±%
AIGP	Nilamani Singh Dandapat	12,544	67.89%	
INC	Balaram Mohapatra	3,653	19.77%	
Independent	Rudra Kissan	2,281	12.34%	
Majority		8,891		
Turnout		18,478	33.39%	
Registered electors		55,347		
AIGP win (new seat)				
