= Jogesh Kumar Singh =

Indian politician

Member of Odisha Legislative Assembly
- Incumbent
- Assumed office 4 June 2024
- Preceded by: Kusum Tete
- Constituency: Sundargarh
- In office 2009–2019
- Succeeded by: Kusum Tete
- Constituency: Sundargarh Assembly constituency

Personal details
- Born: Sargidihi
- Party: Biju Janata Dal
- Other political affiliations: Indian National Congress (Before 2019)
- Profession: Politician

Jogesh Kumar Singh is an Indian politician who was elected to the Odisha Legislative Assembly from Sundargarh as a member of the Biju Janata Dal.
