= OCL Industrial Township =

- Town
- Location in Odisha, India OCL Industrial Township (India)
- Coordinates: 22.1745°N 84.5805°E
- Country: India
- State: Odisha
- District: Sundargarh

Population (2001)
  - Total: 2,197

Languages
  - Official: Odia
- Time zone: UTC+5:30 (IST)
- Vehicle registration: OD
- Website: odisha.gov.in

OCL Industrial Township is an industrial township in Rajgangpur, Sundargarh district in the Indian state of Odisha. It is home to a plant owned by OCL India, Ltd., formerly Odisha Cement, Ltd.

== Demographics ==
As of 2001 India census, OCL Industrial Township had a population of 2197. Males constitute 54% of the population and females 46%. OCL Industrial Township has an average literacy rate of 89%, higher than the national average of 59.5%: male literacy is 90%, and female literacy is 87%. In OCL Industrial Township, 8% of the population is under 6 years of age.
