= Laxman Munda =

Indian politician

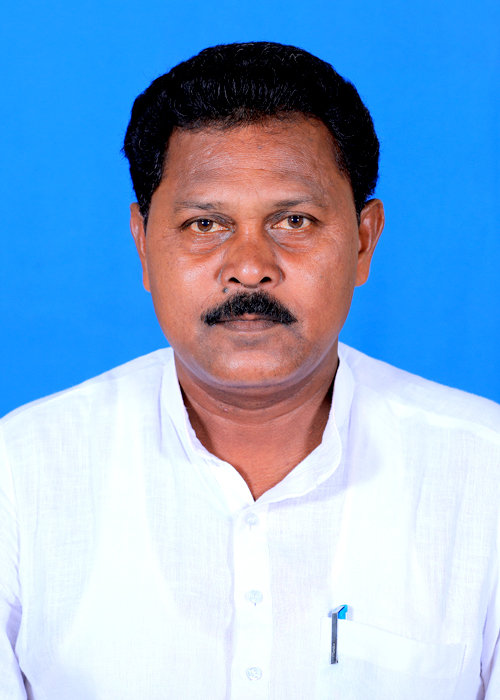

Member of Odisha Legislative Assembly
- Incumbent
- Assumed office 17 April 2014
- Preceded by: Bhimsen Choudhury
- Constituency: Bonai
- In office 2004–2009
- Preceded by: Dayanidhi Kisan
- Succeeded by: Bhimsen Choudhury
- Constituency: Bonai

Personal details
- Born: 18 July 1963 (age 62) Sundergarh, Odisha, India
- Party: Communist Party of India (Marxist)

Laxman Munda (18 July 1963) is an Indian politician from Odisha. He is four time MLA from Bonai Assembly Constituency which is reserved for ST community in Sundargarh district. Representing Communist Party of India (Marxist), he won the Bonai in the 2024 Odisha Legislative Assembly election. Earlier, he was elected as an MLA in 2004, 2014 and 2019 elections.

== Early life and education ==
Munda is from Bonai, Sundergarh. He did his intermediate (plus two) at Bonaigarh College, Sundergarh. Later in 1988, he completed his Bachelor of Arts, also at Bonaigarh College, Sundargarh, which is affiliated with Sambalpur University, Sambalpur.

== Career ==
Munda first became an MLA in 2004. Contesting from Bonai Assembly Constituency representing CPI(M), he won the 2004 Odisha Legislative Assembly election. He lost in 2009 Odisha Legislative Assembly election to Bhimsen Chaudhary of BJD but regained the seat in 2014 Odisha Legislative Assembly election defeating Dayanidhi Kishan of Biju Janata Dal by a margin of 37,307 votes. He retained the seat, winning for the third time in 2019 Odisha Legislative Assembly election defeating Ranjit Kishan, also of BJD, by a margin of 47,909 votes. He won for the fourth time in the 2024 Odisha Legislative Assembly election defeating Bhimsen Chaudhary of Biju Janata Dal by a huge margin of 23,439 votes. Before the 2024 election, some of the Congress cadre were unhappy with Munda as an alliance candidate but the party nominated him again taking a promise that CPI(M) would support the Congress MP candidate.

Electoral history of Munda
Election	House	Constituency	Party	Votes	%	Result
2024	Odisha Legislative Assembly	Bonai	CPI(M)	81,008	43.45	Won
2019	Odisha Legislative Assembly	Bonai	CPI(M)	59,939	34.69	Won
2014	Odisha Legislative Assembly	Bonai	CPI(M)	39,125	23.98	Won
2009	Odisha Legislative Assembly	Bonai	CPI(M)	27,139	21.33	Lost
2004	Odisha Legislative Assembly	Bonai	CPI(M)	37,890	40.17	Won
