= Raghunathpali Assembly constituency =

Constituency of the Odisha legislative assembly in India

Coordinates: 21.82°N 84.16°E

Raghunathpali
- Constituency No. 11 for the Odisha Legislative Assembly
- Raghunathpali Assembly constituency in Sundargarh district

Constituency details
- Country: India
- Region: East India
- State: Odisha
- Division: Northern Division
- District: Sundargarh
- Lok Sabha constituency: Sundargarh
- Established: 1974
- Total electors: 1,83,207 (Note: as on 2024) (Note: as data published by election commission)
- Reservation: SC

Member of Legislative Assembly
- 17th Odisha Legislative Assembly
- Incumbent Durga Charan Tanti
- Party: Bharatiya Janata Party
- Elected year: 2024

Raghunathpali is an Assembly constituency of Sundergarh district in Odisha State. It was established in 1974.

== Extent of Assembly Constituencies ==
- Lathikata Block : Hatibandha, Lathikata, Mundajore, Ramjodi, Suidihi and Jalda GPs
- Rourkela Township.

== Elected members ==
Vote share of winning candidates
2024	43.72%
2019	40.99%
2014	46.45%
2009	45.19%
2004	33.07%
2000	43.98%
1995	32.81%
1990	51.34%
1985	48.43%
1980	45.52%
1977	54.60%

Since its formation in 1974, 12 elections have been held till date.

The members elected from Raghunathpali constituency are:

Year	Member	Party
2024	Durga Charan Tanti	Bharatiya Janata Party
2019	Subrat Tarai	Biju Janata Dal
2014	Subrat Tarai	Biju Janata Dal
2009	Subrat Tarai	Biju Janata Dal
2004	Halu Mundari	Jharkhand Mukti Morcha
2000	Shankar Oram	Bharatiya Janata Party
1995	Mansid Ekka	Jharkhand Mukti Morcha
1990	Rabi Dehury	Janata Dal
1985	Frida Topno	Indian National Congress
1980	Nelson Soreng	Indian National Congress (I)
1977	Rabi Dehury	Janata Party
1974	Agapit Lakra	Indian National Congress

== Election results ==
=== 2024 ===
Voting were held on 20 May 2024 in 2nd phase of Odisha Assembly Election & 5th phase of Indian General Election. Counting of votes was on 4 June 2024. In 2024 election, Bharatiya Janata Party candidate Durga Charan Tanti defeated Biju Janata Dal candidate Archana Rekha Behara by a margin of 5,774 votes.

2024 Odisha Vidhan Sabha Election: Raghunathpali
Party	Candidate	Votes	%	±%
BJP	Durga Charan Tanti	51,189	43.72	
BJD	Archana Rekha Behara	45,415	38.79	
INC	Gopal Das	17,038	14.55	
NOTA	None of the above	1,203	1.03	
Majority		5,774	4.93	
Turnout		1,17,091	63.91	
BJP gain from BJD				

=== 2019 ===
In 2019 election, Biju Janata Dal candidate Subrat Tarai defeated Bharatiya Janata Party candidate Jagabandhu Behera by 4,684 votes.

2019 Odisha Vidhan Sabha Election: Raghunathpali
Party	Candidate	Votes	%	±%
BJD	Subrat Tarai	44,815	40.99	▼5.46
BJP	Jagabandhu Behera	40,131	36.71	▲5.44
INC	Prasanta Kumar Sethi	20,026	18.32	▲4.53
NOTA	None of the above	955	0.87	−
Majority		4,684	4.28	
Turnout		109324	61.4	
BJD hold				

=== 2014 ===
In 2014 election, Biju Janata Dal candidate Subrat Tarai defeated Bharatiya Janata Party candidate Jagabandhu Behera by 16,041 votes.

2014 Odisha Vidhan Sabha Election: Raghunathpali
Party	Candidate	Votes	%	±%
BJD	Subrat Tarai	49,074	46.45	▲1.26
BJP	Jagabandhu Behera	33,033	31.27	▲9.53
INC	Gajendra Tanty	14,566	13.79	▼7.95
NOTA	None of the above	1,523	1.44	−
Majority		16,041	15.18	
Turnout		1,05,640	65.97	
Registered electors		160,138		
BJD hold				

=== 2009 ===
In 2009 election, Biju Janata Dal candidate Subrat Tarai defeated Indian National Congress candidate Prafulla Kumar Sunyani by a margin of 18,171 votes.

2009 Odisha Vidhan Sabha Election: Raghunathpali
Party	Candidate	Votes	%	±%
BJD	Subrat Tarai	35,023	45.19	−
INC	Prafulla Kumar Sunyani	16,852	21.74	−
BJP	Santosh Kumar Behera	11,398	14.71	−
Majority		18,171	23.45 (Note: % of total valid votes)	
Turnout		77,536	51.42	
BJD gain from JMM				
