= Janardan Dehury =

Indian politician

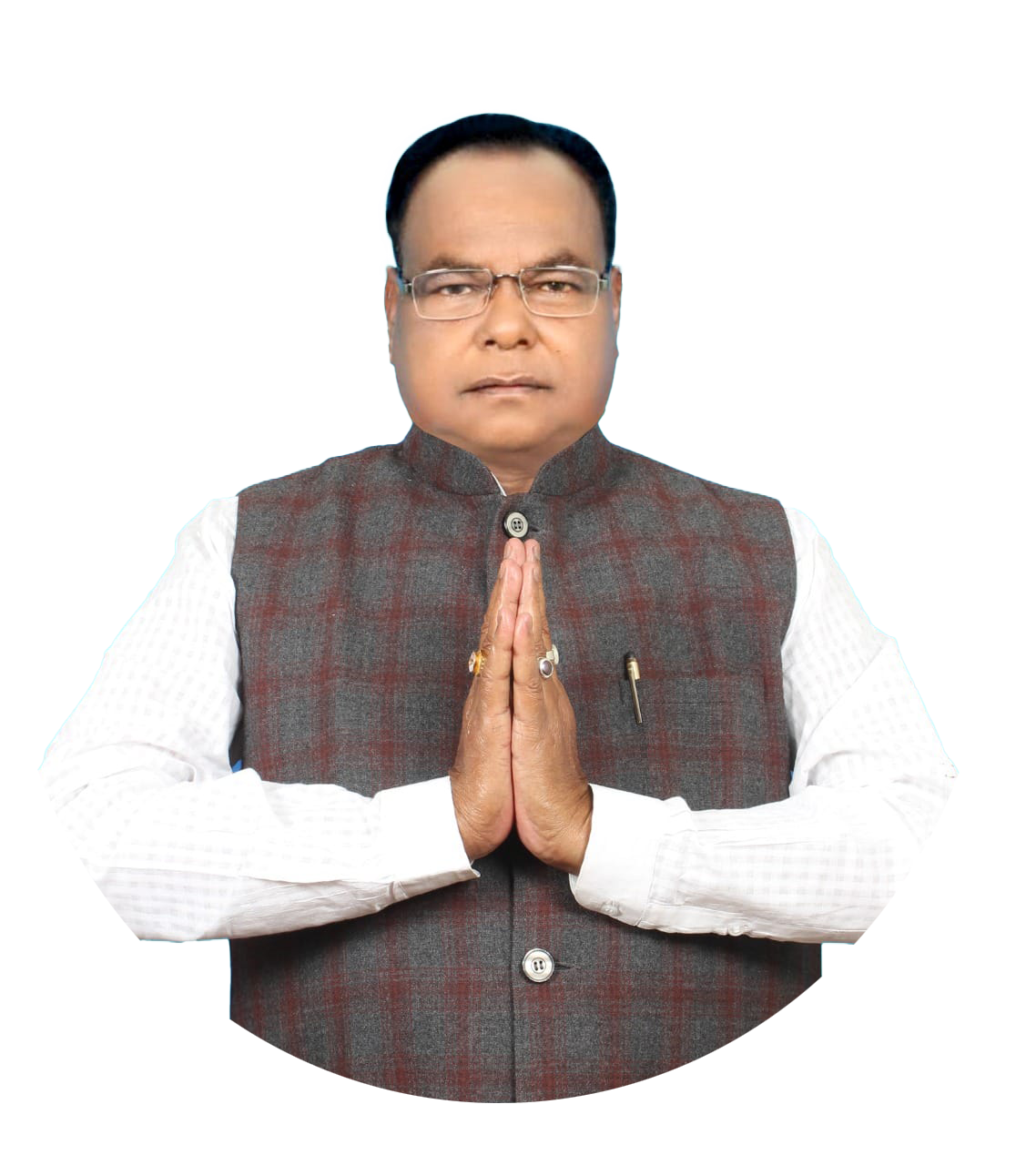
- Former MLA and Tribal Leader of Sundargarh, Mr. Janardan Dehury

Member of Odisha Legislative Assembly
- In office 1997–2000
- Preceded by: Jual Oram
- Succeeded by: Dayanidhi Kisan
- Constituency: Bonai

Personal details
- Party: Indian National Congress
- Spouse: Damayanti Dehury
- Children: Jagannath Dehury & Rohit Dehury
- Parent(s): Kalyan & Labanga Dehury

Janardhan Dehury is an Indian National Congress politician, tribal leader and a social worker from Sundargarh district. He was also a member of the Odisha Legislative Assembly from 1997 to 2000, elected in a by-election from Bonai. He is married to Damayanti Dehury and has two sons Rohit and Jagannath Dehury.
