= Christopher Ekka =

Indian politician

Member of Parliament, Lok Sabha
- In office 1980-1984
- Preceded by: Debananda Amat
- Succeeded by: Maurice Kujur
- Constituency: Sundargarh, Odisha

Personal details
- Born: 24 July 1943 (age 82) Kusumdegi, Sundargarh District, Orissa, British India
- Party: Indian National Congress
- Spouse: Sebastiana Lakra
- Children: C. S. Raazen Ekka

Christopher Ekka is an Indian politician. He was elected to the Lok Sabha, the lower house of the Parliament of India from Sundargarh, Odisha as a member of the Indian National Congress.
