= Kusum Tete =

Indian politician

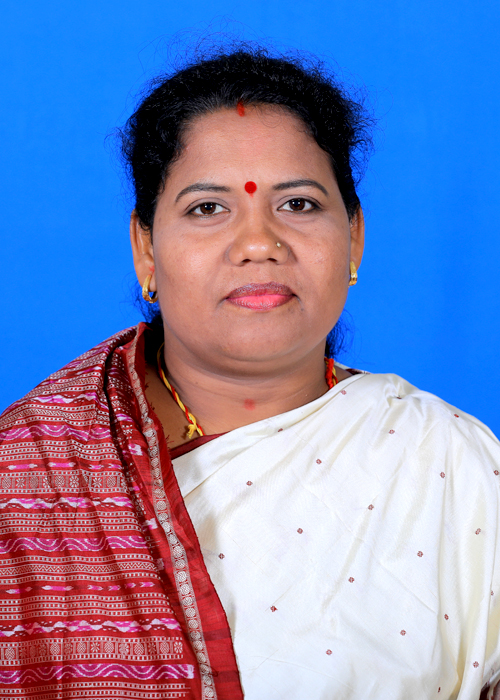

Member of Odisha Legislative Assembly
- In office 2019–2024
- Preceded by: Jogesh Kumar Singh
- Succeeded by: Jogesh Kumar Singh
- Constituency: Sundargarh (ST)

Personal details
- Born: 17 July 1973 (age 52)
- Party: Bharatiya Janata Party
- Spouse: Ajay Kumar Patel
- Children: 2 sons
- Parent: Jonas Tete (father)
- Education: Bachelor of Arts
- Profession: Politician

Kusum Tete is a Bharatiya Janata Party politician from Odisha. She has been elected in Odisha Legislative Assembly election in 2019 from Sundargarh constituency as candidate of Bharatiya Janata Party.
