= Shankar Oram =

Indian politician

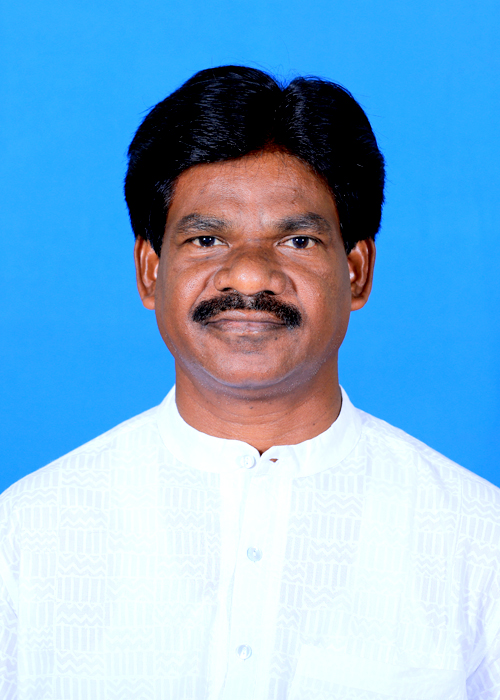

Member of Odisha Legislative Assembly
- In office 2019–2024
- Preceded by: George Tirkey
- Succeeded by: Rohit Joseph Tirkey
- Constituency: Biramitrapur
- In office 2000–2004
- Preceded by: Mansid Ekka
- Succeeded by: Halu Mundari
- Constituency: Raghunathpali

Personal details
- Born: 31 August 1969 (age 56)
- Party: Bharatiya Janata Party
- Spouse: Chamari Oram
- Children: 2 sons
- Parent: Mangu Oram (father)
- Education: Diploma in Civil Engineering
- Profession: Agriculturist; Social Service

Shankar Oram (born on 31 August 1969) is an Indian politician. He was elected to the Odisha Legislative Assembly from Biramitrapur in the 2019 Odisha Legislative Assembly election as a member of the Bharatiya Janata Party.
