= Sundargarh Assembly constituency =

Assembly constituency in Odisha

Coordinates: 22.12°N 84.04°E

Sundargarh
- Constituency No. 9 for the Odisha Legislative Assembly

Constituency details
- Country: India
- Region: East India
- State: Odisha
- Division: Northern Division
- District: Sundargarh
- Lok Sabha constituency: Sundargarh
- Established: 1951
- Total electors: 2,30,729 (Note: as on 2024) (Note: as data published by election commission)
- Reservation: ST

Member of Legislative Assembly
- 17th Odisha Legislative Assembly
- Incumbent Jogesh Kumar Singh
- Party: Biju Janata Dal
- Elected year: 2024

Sundargarh is an Assembly constituency of Sundergarh district in Odisha State. It was established in 1951.

== Extent of Assembly Constituencies ==
- Tangarpali Block
- Hemgiri Block
- Lephripara Block : Badbanga, Chhatenpali, Darlipali, Jhurimal, Raibaga, Raidihi and Sargipali GPs
- Sundargarh Block
- Sundargarh Muncipalty.

== Elected members ==
Vote share of winning candidates
2024	48.15%
2019	47.67%
2014	41.77%
2009	43.92%
2005 (bypoll)	47.76%
2004	50.12%
2000	54.89%
1995	45.43%
1990	67.04%
1985	56.03%
1980	73.52%
1977	55.87%

Since its formation in 1951, 18 elections were held till date including in one bypoll in 2005. It was a 2 member constituency for 1952 & 1957.

List of members elected from Sundargarh constituency are:

Year	Member	Party
2024	Jogesh Kumar Singh	Biju Janata Dal
2019	Kusum Tete	Bharatiya Janata Party
2014	Jogesh Kumar Singh	Indian National Congress
2009	Jogesh Kumar Singh	Indian National Congress
2005 (bypoll) (Note: Death of Shankarsan Naik)	Sushama Patel	Bharatiya Janata Party
2004	Shankarsan Naik	Bharatiya Janata Party
2000	Shankarsan Naik	Bharatiya Janata Party
1995	Kishore Chandra Patel	Indian National Congress
1990	Bharatendra Sekhar Deo	Janata Dal
1985	Bharatendra Sekhar Deo	Janata Party
1980	Kishore Chandra Patel	Indian National Congress (I)
1977	Kishore Chandra Patel	Indian National Congress
1974	Dibyalochan Shekhar Deo	Indian National Congress
1971	Dibyalochan Shekhar Deo	Indian National Congress (R)
1967	Harihar Patel	Swatantra Party
1961	Harihar Patel	Swatantra Party
1957 (Note: It was a 2 member constituency)	Gangadhar Pradhan	Ganatantra Parishad
1957	Udit Pratap Sekhar Deo	Ganatantra Parishad
1951 (Note: It was a 2 member constituency)	Dwarikanath Kusum	Ganatantra Parishad
1951	Krupanidhi Naik	Indian National Congress
1946 (Note: It was a 2 member constituency)	Ram Charan Patel	Independent politician
1946	Shib Narayan Singh Mohapatra	Independent politician

== Election results ==
=== 2024 ===
Voting were held on 20 May 2024 in 2nd phase of Odisha Assembly Election & 5th phase of Indian General Election. Counting of votes was on 4 June 2024. In 2024 election, Biju Janata Dal candidate Jogesh Kumar Singh defeated Bharatiya Janata Party candidate Kusum Tete by a margin of 10,066 votes.

2024 Odisha Vidhan Sabha Election, Sundargarh
Party	Candidate	Votes	%	±%
BJD	Jogesh Kumar Singh	86,398	48.15	▲4.70
BJP	Kusum Tete	77,276	43.07	▼4.60
INC	Sudharani Raudia	8,301	4.63	▼2.30
NOTA	None of the above	1,755	0.98	▼0.15
Majority		9,122		
Turnout		1,79,440	75.7	
BJD gain from BJP		Swing		

=== 2019 ===
In 2019 election, Bharatiya Janata Party candidate Kusum Tete defeated Biju Janata Dal candidate Jogesh Kumar Singh by a margin of 7364 votes.

2019 Odisha Legislative Assembly election: Sundargarh
Party	Candidate	Votes	%	±%
BJP	Kusum Tete	83,118	47.67	▲30.03
BJD	Jogesh Kumar Singh	75,754	43.45	▲9.63
INC	Amita Biswal	12,087	6.93	▼34.84
NOTA	None of the above	1,967	1.13	−
Majority		7364	4.22	
Turnout		174346	75.14	
BJP gain from INC				

=== 2014 ===
In 2014 election, Indian National Congress candidate Jogesh Kumar Singh defeated Biju Janata Dal candidate Kusum Tete by a margin of 12584 votes.

2014 Vidhan Sabha Election, Sundargarh
Party	Candidate	Votes	%	±%
INC	Jogesh Kumar Singh	66,138	41.77	▼2.15
BJD	Kusum Tete	53,554	33.82	▲6.56
BJP	Sahadev Xaxa	27,935	17.64	▼2.45
NOTA	None of the above	2,358	1.49	−
Majority		12,584	7.95	
Turnout		1,58,356	73.26	7.71
Registered electors		2,16,152		
INC hold				

=== 2009 ===
In 2009 election, Indian National Congress candidate Jogesh Kumar Singh defeated Biju Janata Dal candidate Sunil Kumar Singh Deo by 20,930 votes.

2009 Vidhan Sabha Election, Sundargarh
Party	Candidate	Votes	%	±%
INC	Jogesh Kumar Singh	55,183	43.92	−
BJD	Sunil Kumar Singh Deo	34,253	27.26	−
BJP	Prem Sagar Oram	25,245	20.09	−
Majority		20,930	16.66 (Note: % of total valid votes)	
Turnout		1,26,076	65.55	
INC gain from BJP				
