= C. S. Raazen Ekka =

Indian politician from Odisha

Member of Odisha Legislative Assembly
- Incumbent
- Assumed office 2019
- Preceded by: Mangala Kisan
- Constituency: Rajgangpur

Personal details
- Born: 6 April 1972 (age 54)
- Party: Indian National Congress
- Parent: Christopher Ekka
- Occupation: Politician, Doctor, Army Colonel (Retd.)

C. S. Raazen Ekka (born 6 April 1972) is an Indian politician from Odisha and a member of Odisha Legislative Assembly from Rajgangpur. He is a member of the Indian National Congress.
