= Biramitrapur Assembly constituency =

Constituency of the Odisha legislative assembly in India

Coordinates: 22.41°N 84.72°E

Biramitrapur
- Constituency No. 10 for the Odisha Legislative Assembly
- Biramitrapur Assembly constituency in Sundargarh district

Constituency details
- Country: India
- Region: East India
- State: Odisha
- Division: Northern Division
- District: Sundargarh
- Lok Sabha constituency: Sundargarh
- Established: 1974
- Total electors: 2,44,417 (Note: as on 2024) (Note: as data published by election commission)
- Reservation: ST

Member of Legislative Assembly
- 17th Odisha Legislative Assembly
- Incumbent Rohit Joseph Tirkey
- Party: Biju Janata Dal
- Elected year: 2024

Biramitrapur is an Assembly constituency of Sundergarh district in Odisha State. It was established in 1974.

== Extent of Assembly Constituencies ==
- Kuarmunda Block
- Nuagaon Block
- Birmitrapur Municipality
- Bisra Block (excluding Kulunga (O.G) Jagada & Jhirpani GPs).

== Elected members ==
Vote share of winning candidates
| 2024 | 44.53% |
| 2019 | 34.66% |
| 2014 | 28.41% |
| 2009 | 36.38% |
| 2004 | 43.01% |
| 2000 | 47.05% |
| 1995 | 48.59% |
| 1990 | 42.61% |
| 1985 | 52.98% |
| 1980 | 32.92% |
| 1977 | 36.46% |

Since its formation in 1951, 12 elections have been held till date.

List of members elected from Biramitrapur constituency are:

| Year | Member | Party |
|---|---|---|
| 2024 | Rohit Joseph Tirkey | Biju Janata Dal |
| 2019 | Shankar Oram | Bharatiya Janata Party |
| 2014 | George Tirkey | Samata Kranti Dal |
| 2009 | George Tirkey | Independent politician |
| 2004 | Nihar Surin | Jharkhand Mukti Morcha |
| 2000 | George Tirkey | Jharkhand Mukti Morcha |
| 1995 | George Tirkey | Jharkhand Mukti Morcha |
| 1990 | Satyanarayan Pradhan | Janata Dal |
| 1985 | Remis Kerketta | Indian National Congress |
| 1980 | Junas Bilung | Indian National Congress (I) |
| 1977 | Premchand Bhagat | Janata Party |
| 1974 | Christodas Lagun | Jharkhand Party |

== Election results ==
=== 2024 ===
Voting was held on 20 May 2024 in 2nd phase of Odisha Assembly Election & 5th phase of Indian General Election. Counting of votes was on 4 June 2024. In 2024 election, Biju Janata Dal candidate Rohit Joseph Tirkey defeated Bharatiya Janata Party candidate Shankar Oram by a margin of 6,884 votes.

2024 Odisha Vidhan Sabha Election, Biramitrapur(ST)
| Party | Candidate | Votes | % | ±% |
|---|---|---|---|---|
| BJD | Rohit Joseph Tirkey | 84,116 | 44.53 | ▲19.17 |
| BJP | Shankar Oram | 77,232 | 40.89 | ▲6.23 |
| Jharkhand Party | Remish Jojo | 8,871 | 4.70 | |
| NOTA | None of the above | 1,909 | 1.01 | ▼0.02 |
| Majority | | 6,884 | | |
| Turnout | | 188,898 | 77.29 | |
| BJD gain from BJP | | Swing | | |

=== 2019 ===
In 2019 election, Bharatiya Janata Party candidate Shankar Oram defeated Biju Janata Dal candidate Makhlu Ekka by a margin of 16,351 votes.

2019 Vidhan Sabha Election, Biramitrapur
| Party | Candidate | Votes | % | ±% |
|---|---|---|---|---|
| BJP | Shankar Oram | 60,937 | 34.66 | ▲13.61 |
| BJD | Makhlu Ekka | 44,586 | 25.36 | ▲9.86 |
| INC | Rohit Joseph Tirkey | 44,212 | 25.15 | ▲17.14 |
| NOTA | None of the above | 1,804 | 1.03 | − |
| Majority | | 16,351 | 9.29 | |
| Turnout | | 1,75,823 | 74.96 | |
| BJP gain from BJD | | | | |

=== 2014 ===
In 2014 election, Samata Kranti Dal candidate George Tirkey defeated Bharatiya Janata Party candidate Shankar Oram by a margin of 11,947 votes.

2014 Vidhan Sabha Election, Biramitrapur
| Party | Candidate | Votes | % | ±% |
|---|---|---|---|---|
| SKD | George Tirkey | 46,114 | 28.41 | − |
| BJP | Shankar Oram | 34,167 | 21.05 | ▲10.78 |
| JMM | Sebeyan Aind | 27,849 | 17.16 | ▼2.44 |
| BJD | Magdali Kongadi | 25,158 | 15.5 | ▼0.35 |
| INC | Rajesh Kerketta | 13,006 | 8.01 | ▼2.01 |
| NOTA | None | 1,496 | 0.92 | − |
| Majority | | 11,947 | 7.36 | − |
| Turnout | | 1,62,315 | 77.26 | 8.51 |
| Registered electors | | 2,10,077 | | |
| SKD gain from Independent | | | | |

=== 2009 ===
In 2009 election, independent candidate George Tirkey defeated Jharkhand Mukti Morcha candidate Nihar Soren by a margin of 20,811 votes.

2009 Vidhan Sabha Election, Biramitrapur
| Party | Candidate | Votes | % | ±% |
|---|---|---|---|---|
| Independent | George Tirkey | 45,132 | 36.38 | − |
| JMM | Nihar Soren | 24,321 | 19.60 | − |
| BJD | Sanjib Pratab Singhdeo | 19,665 | 15.85 | − |
| BJP | Raisan Tirkey | 12,748 | 10.27 | − |
| INC | Serophina Tapno | 12,431 | 10.02 | − |
| Majority | | 20,811 | 16.77 (Note: %of total valid votes) | |
| Turnout | | 1,24,116 | 68.75 | |
| Independent gain from JMM | | | | |
