= Rajgangpur Assembly constituency =

Constituency of the Odisha legislative assembly in India

Coordinates: 22.19°N 84.58°E

Rajgangpur
- Constituency No. 13 for the Odisha Legislative Assembly
- Rajgangpur Assembly constituency in Sundargarh district

Constituency details
- Country: India
- Region: East India
- State: Odisha
- Division: Northern Division
- District: Sundargarh
- Lok Sabha constituency: Sundargarh
- Established: 1951
- Total electors: 2,53,571 (Note: as on 2024) (Note: as data published by election commission)
- Reservation: ST

Member of Legislative Assembly
- 17th Odisha Legislative Assembly
- Incumbent C. S. Raazen Ekka
- Party: Indian National Congress
- Elected year: 2024

Rajgangpur is an Assembly constituency of Sundergarh district in Odisha State. It was established in 1951.

== Extent of Assembly Constituencies ==
- Rajgangpur Block
- Rajgangpur Muncipalty including OCL Industrial Township
- Lathikata Block : Bad-Dalki, Birda, Birkera, Tainsar, Jhartrang, Chikatmati, Garjan, Balanda, Kulunga and Jadakudar GPs
- Kutra Block.

== Members of Legislative Assembly ==
Vote share of winning candidates
2024	36.74%
2019	30.98%
2014	34.19%
2009	30.91%
2004	50.79%
2000	45.69%
1995	37.93%
1985	52.37%
1990	64.26%
1980	33.03%
1977	49.39%

Since its formation in 1951, 17 elections have been held till date.

List of members elected from Rajgangpur constituency is:

Year	Member	Party
2024	C. S. Raazen Ekka	Indian National Congress
2019	C. S. Raazen Ekka	Indian National Congress
2014	Mangala Kisan	Biju Janata Dal
2009	Gregory Minz	Indian National Congress
2004	Gregory Minz	Indian National Congress
2000	Mangala Kisan	Biju Janata Dal
1995	Mangala Kisan	Janata Dal
1990	Mangala Kisan	Janata Dal
1985	Mangala Kisan	Janata Party
1980	Mukharam Naik	Indian National Congress (I)
1977	Brajamohan Kisan	Janata Party
1974	Christopher Ekka	Indian National Congress
1971	Ignace Majhi	Jharkhand Party
1967	Premchand Bhagat	Swatantra Party
1961	Rangaballabh Amat	Indian National Congress
1957	Santi Prakash Oram	Independent politician
1951	Agapit Lakra	Indian National Congress

== Election results ==
=== 2024 ===
Voting were held on 20 May 2024 in 2nd phase of Odisha Assembly Election & 5th phase of Indian General Election. Counting of votes was on 4 June 2024. In 2024 election, Indian National Congress candidate C. S. Raazen Ekka defeated Biju Janata Dal candidate Anil Barwa by 10,184 votes.

2024 Odisha Vidhan Sabha Election, Rajgangpur
Party	Candidate	Votes	%	±%
INC	C. S. Raazen Ekka	66,869	36.74	▲5.76
BJD	Anil Barwa	56,685	31.14	▲0.70
BJP	Narasingha Minz	52,655	28.93	▼1.46
NOTA	None of the above	1,944	1.07	▲0.50
Majority		10,184		
Turnout		182,030	71.79	
INC hold				

=== 2019 ===
In 2019 election, Indian National Congress candidate C. S. Raazen Ekka defeated Biju Janata Dal candidate Mangala Kisan by 946 votes.

2019 Odisha Legislative Assembly election: Rajgangpur
Party	Candidate	Votes	%	±%
INC	C. S. Raazen Ekka	53,918	30.98	▲3.07
BJD	Mangala Kisan	52,972	30.44	▼3.75
BJP	Narasingha Minz	52,896	30.39	▲12.42
NOTA	None of the above	995	0.57	−
Majority		946	0.54	
Turnout		174030	68.79	
INC gain from BJD		Swing		

=== 2014 ===
In 2014 election, Biju Janata Dal candidate Mangala Kisan defeated Indian National Congress candidate Gregory Minz by 10,036 votes.

2014 Vidhan Sabha Election, Rajgangpur
Party	Candidate	Votes	%	±%
BJD	Mangala Kisan	54,596	34.19	▲6.85
INC	Gregory Minz	44,560	27.91	▼3.0
BJP	Upendra Pradhan	28,694	17.97	▲3.51
NOTA	None of the above	1,105	0.69	−
Majority		10,036	6.28	
Turnout		1,59,675	70.83	
Registered electors		2,25,420		
BJD gain from INC				

=== 2009 ===
In 2009 election, Indian National Congress candidate Gregory Minz defeated Biju Janata Dal candidate Benedikt Tirkey by 4,115 votes.

2009 Vidhan Sabha Election, Rajgangpur
Party	Candidate	Votes	%	±%
INC	Gregory Minz	35,592	30.91	−
BJD	Benedikt Tirkey	31,477	27.34	−
JMM	Halu Mundari	17,693	15.37	−
BJP	Mahendra Kumar Majhi	16,654	14.46	−
Majority		4,115	3.57 (Note: % of total valid votes)	
Turnout		1,15,501	60.99	
INC hold				
