= Maurice Kujur =

Indian politician (1935–2020)

Member of Parliament, Lok Sabha
- In office 1984–1989
- Preceded by: Debananda Amat
- Succeeded by: Frida Topno
- Constituency: Sundargarh, Odisha

Personal details
- Born: 2 November 1935 Belmunda, Sundargarh District, Orissa, British India
- Died: 12 January 2020 (aged 84) Bhubaneswar, Odisha, India
- Party: Indian National Congress
- Spouse: Rajani Khalkho

Maurice Kujur (2 November 1935 – 12 January 2020) was an Indian politician. He was elected to the Lok Sabha, the lower house of the Parliament of India from Sundargarh, Odisha as a member of the Indian National Congress.
