= Durga Charan Tanti =

Indian politician

Member of Odisha Legislative Assembly
- Incumbent
- Assumed office 4 June 2024
- Preceded by: Subrat Tarai
- Constituency: Raghunathpali

Personal details
- Party: Bharatiya Janata Party
- Profession: Politician

Durga Charan Tanti is an Indian politician.

== Career ==
He was elected to the Odisha Legislative Assembly from Raghunathpali as a member of the Bharatiya Janata Party.
