= Ministry of Tribal Affairs =

Government ministry of India

- Branch of Government of India

- Ministry of Tribal Affairs

Agency overview
- Jurisdiction: Government of India
- Headquarters: Ministry of Tribal Affairs; Shastri Bhawan; Dr. Rajendra Prasad Road; New Delhi,110011; New Delhi
- Annual budget: ₹15,421.97 crore (US$1.6 billion) (2026-27 est.)
- Ministers responsible: Jual Oram, Cabinet Minister; Durga Das Uikey, Minister of State
- Agency executive: Ranjana Chopra, Secretary, IAS
- Website: tribal.gov.in

The Ministry of Tribal Affairs (MOTA) is an Indian Government ministry charged with overall development of Scheduled Tribe communities of India by providing them education, scholarships, grants to create more health infrastructure in tribal communities, preservation of Tribal Culture & languages and direct cash transfer schemes to economically backward tribal families.

== History ==
The ministry was set up in 1999 after the bifurcation of Ministry of Social Justice and Empowerment (India) to have a more focused approach on the integrated socio-economic development of the Scheduled Tribes (STs), the most underprivileged of the Indian Society. Before the formation of the ministry the tribal Affairs was being handled by different ministries which were:

1. As a Division of the Ministry of Home Affairs known as Tribal Division since after independence up to September 1985.
2. Ministry of Welfare: From September 1985 to May 1998.
3. Ministry of Social Justice & Empowerment from May 1998 to September 1999.

== Functions of the ministry ==
1. Tribal Welfare-Planning, Policy formulation, Research and Training.
2. Tribal development including scholarships to STs.
3. Promotion of voluntary efforts in development of STs.
4. Administrative Ministry with respect to matters concerning Scheduled Areas.

The Ministry of Tribal Affairs is the Nodal Ministry for overall policy, planning and coordination of programmes of development for Scheduled Tribes.

== Agencies ==
Ministry has one Commission, One Public Sector Undertaking and one Co-operative Society under its administrative control, namely :

1. National Commission for Scheduled Tribes (NCST)
2. National Scheduled Tribes Finance and Development Corporation (NSTFDC)
3. Tribal Co-operative Marketing Federation of India (TRIFED)
4. National Education Society for Tribal Students

== Schemes and Programmes ==
- Adi Prashikshan
- Adi Vaani App
- Adi-Prasarasn
- Adivasi Grants Management System
- Direct Benefit Transfer Portal (DBT)
- Going Online as Leaders Program (GOAL)
- NGO Grants Online System
- National Overseas Scholarship Portal
- National Tribal Fellowship Portal
- National Tribal Migration Support Portal
- National Tribal Research Portal
- National Tribal Virtual Art and Culture Portal
- Scheduled Tribe Component Monitoring System
- Scheduled Tribes and Other Traditional Forest Dwellers
- Spring Water Atlas
- Swasthya, Tribal Health and Nutrition Portal
- Tribal Digital Document Repository

== Cabinet Ministers ==
The Minister of Tribal Affairs is the head of the Ministry of Tribal Affairs and one of the cabinet ministers of the Government of India.

Portrait	Minister (Birth-Death) Constituency	Term of office			Political party	Ministry	Prime Minister
Portrait	Minister (Birth-Death) Constituency	From	To	Period	Political party	Ministry	Prime Minister
	Jual Oram (born 1961); MP for Sundargarh	13 October 1999	22 May 2004	4 years, 222 days	Bharatiya Janata Party	Vajpayee III	Atal Bihari Vajpayee
	Paty Ripple Kyndiah (1928–2015); MP for Shillong	23 May 2004	22 May 2009	4 years, 364 days	Indian National Congress	Manmohan I	Manmohan Singh
	Kantilal Bhuria (born 1950); MP for Ratlam	28 May 2009	12 July 2011	2 years, 45 days	Indian National Congress	Manmohan II	Manmohan Singh
	V. Kishore Chandra Deo (born 1947); MP for Araku	12 July 2011	26 May 2014	2 years, 318 days	Indian National Congress	Manmohan II	Manmohan Singh
	Jual Oram (born 1961); MP for Sundargarh	27 May 2014	30 May 2019	5 years, 3 days	Bharatiya Janata Party	Modi I	Narendra Modi
	Arjun Munda (born 1968); MP for Khunti	31 May 2019	9 June 2024	5 years, 9 days	Bharatiya Janata Party	Modi II	Narendra Modi
	Jual Oram (born 1961); MP for Sundargarh	10 June 2024	Incumbent	2 years, 60 days	Bharatiya Janata Party	Modi III	Narendra Modi

== Ministers of State ==
Portrait	Minister (Birth-Death) Constituency	Term of office			Political party	Ministry	Prime Minister
Portrait	Minister (Birth-Death) Constituency	From	To	Period	Political party	Ministry	Prime Minister
	Faggan Singh Kulaste (born 1959); MP for Mandla	22 November 1999	22 May 2004	4 years, 182 days	Bharatiya Janata Party	Vajpayee III	Atal Bihari Vajpayee
	Rameshwar Oraon (born 1947); MP for Lohardaga	6 April 2008	22 May 2009	1 year, 46 days	Indian National Congress	Manmohan I	Manmohan Singh
	Tushar Amarsinh Chaudhary (born 1965); MP for Bardoli	28 May 2009	19 January 2011	1 year, 236 days	Indian National Congress	Manmohan II	Manmohan Singh
	Mahadeo Singh Khandela (born 1943); MP for Sikar	19 January 2011	27 October 2012	1 year, 282 days	Indian National Congress	Manmohan II	Manmohan Singh
	Ranee Narah (born 1965); MP for Lakhimpur	28 October 2012	26 May 2014	1 year, 210 days	Indian National Congress	Manmohan II	Manmohan Singh
	Mansukhbhai Vasava (born 1957); MP for Bharuch	27 May 2014	5 July 2016	2 years, 39 days	Bharatiya Janata Party	Modi I	Narendra Modi
	Jasvantsinh Sumanbhai Bhabhor (born 1966); MP for Dahod	5 July 2016	30 May 2019	2 years, 329 days	Bharatiya Janata Party	Modi I	Narendra Modi
	Sudarshan Bhagat (born 1969); MP for Lohardaga	3 September 2017	30 May 2019	1 year, 269 days	Bharatiya Janata Party	Modi I	Narendra Modi
	Renuka Singh Saruta (born 1964); MP for Sarguja	31 May 2019	7 December 2023	4 years, 190 days	Bharatiya Janata Party	Modi II	Narendra Modi
	Bishweswar Tudu (born 1965); MP for Mayurbhanj	7 July 2021	9 June 2024	2 years, 338 days	Bharatiya Janata Party	Modi II	Narendra Modi
	Bharati Pawar (born 1978); MP for Dindori	7 December 2023	9 June 2024	185 days	Bharatiya Janata Party	Modi II	Narendra Modi
	Durga Das Uikey (born 1963); MP for Betul	10 June 2024	Incumbent	2 years, 60 days	Bharatiya Janata Party	Modi III	Narendra Modi

== Initiatives ==
=== Van Dhan Samajik Doori Jagrookta Abhiyaan ===
Amidst the COVID-19 crisis in May 2020 the TRIFED, a cooperative body under Ministry of Tribal Affairs registered under Multi-State Co-operative Societies Act launched this scheme in order to educate the tribals in COVID related safety measures. Nationwide and state specific webinars were organised in order to bring awareness on the issue. The Ministry also revised Minimum Support Price (MSP) for Minor forest products (MFP) to be procured from the tribals under MSP for MFP scheme meanwhile promoting door to door procurement and sale through mobile vans. The program was launched in association with UNICEF.

=== Swasthya portal ===
Ministry of tribal affairs launched the Swasthya portal, which will act as one stop solution for matters related to health and nutrition status of the Scheduled Tribes. The Ministry's centre of excellence for knowledge management in health and nutrition will manage the portal and it will be hosted on National Informatics Centre cloud.

=== Going online as leaders program (GOAL) ===
The Ministry had partnered with Facebook to launch "GOAL" program which aims at training 5000 tribal youths through digital education in order to make them emerge as the village level digital young leaders of their community. The scheme includes distribution of mobile phones for the promotion of digital literacy and to narrow the digital divide among various section of population.

=== ALEKH ===
It is an e-newsletter launched by the Ministry in order to showcase the efforts of various stakeholders which are involved in improving the health and wellbeing of tribal population. It will be launched on quarterly basis.

== See also ==
- Eklavya Model Residential Schools, started by the Ministry
- Department of Adi Dravidar and Tribal Welfare (Tamil Nadu)
