= Gangpur State =

Former Indian State

Coordinates: 22.12°N 84.03°E

- Princely State of British India
- 1804–1948
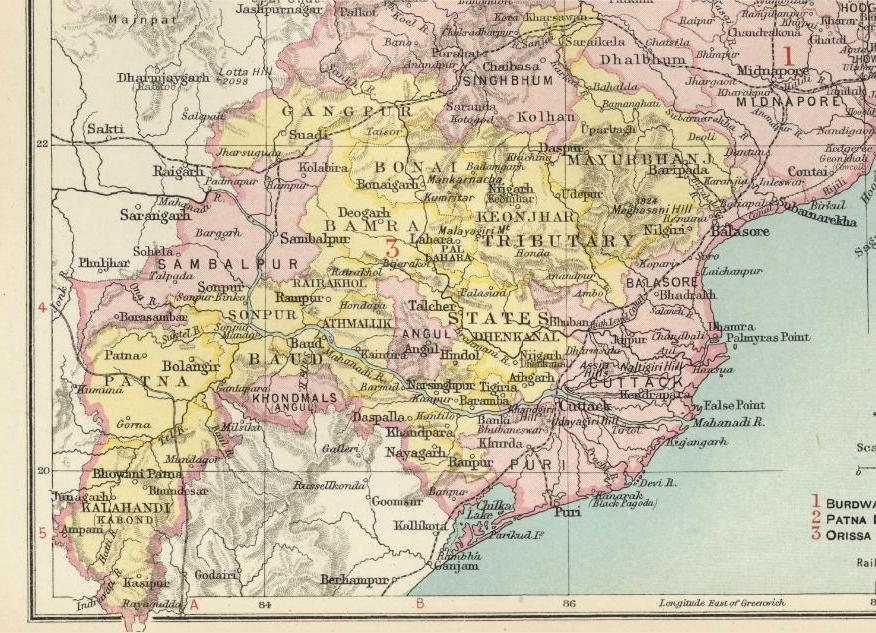
- Gangpur State in the Imperial Gazetteer of India
- Area
  - 1941: 6,454 km^{2} (2,492 sq mi)
- Population
  - 1941: 398,171
- History
  - Established: 1804
  - Accession to the Indian Union: 1948
Succeeded by
India

Gangpur State, also known as Gangpore State, was one of the princely states of India during the period of the British Raj. Until 1905 it was one of the Chhota Nagpur States under the Eastern States Agency.

Covering an area of 6,454 km^{2}, in 1941 Gangpur had a population of 398,171. The population was predominantly Odia speaking. It was made part of India on 1 January 1948. The capital of Gangpur State was modern Sundargarh of Western Odisha.

== History ==
According to tradition, the dynasty was established by Gangadhar Sekhar Deo, a scion of the Sekhar dynasty from Sikharbhum near the Singhbhum region of Eastern India with the help of the dominant local Bhuyan clans. Written archival records point to the reign of Indra Shekhar Deo under whom the region formally became a part of the British Empire after the defeat of the Marathas in the Second Anglo-Maratha War.

Gangpur was a feudatory estate of Sambalpur. In 1821 the British authorities canceled the feudatory rights of Sambalpur over Gangpur and the ruler was granted a deed/sanad, by which Gangpur was recognized as a princely state in its own right. On 1 January 1948 the last ruler of Gangpur signed the document of accession to the Indian Union after independence, following which it merged with the state of Odisha, forming a part of the Sundergarh district.

== Rulers ==
The rulers of Gangpur of Sekhar dynasty:

- Gangdhar Sekhar Deo
- ...
- Indra Sekhar Deo (1804 – 1820)
- Parshuram Sekhar Deo (1820 – 1831)
- Jagadev Sekhar Deo (1831 – 1852)
- Chandrabhanu Sekhar Deo (1852 – 1858)
- Mohan Sekhar Deo (1858)
- Raghunath Sekhar Deo (28 Oct 1858 – 10 June 1917)
- Bhabani Shankar Sekhar Deo (10 June 1917 – 5 May 1930)
- Bir Mitra Pratap Sekhar Deo (5 May 1930 – 26 December 1938)
- Rani Janaki Rathnayammarjee of Kurupam (f) - Regent (5 May 1930 – 26 December 1938 and 26 December 1938 – 27 November 1944)
- Bir Udit Pratap Sekhar Deo (26 December 1938 – 1 October 1948)

=== Titular ===
- Bir Udit Pratap Sekhar Deo (1 October 1948 - 1967)
- Birendra Sekhar Deo (1967 - 2010)
- Samarendra Sekhar Deo (2010 - current)
