= Frida Topno =

Indian politician (1925–2018)

- 𞓑𞓞𞓣𞓚𞓜𞓕 𞓩𞓐𞓑𞓨𞓐

Member of 10th Lok Sabha
- Incumbent
- Assumed office 1991
- Constituency: Sundergarh

Member of 11th Lok Sabha
- Incumbent
- Assumed office 1996

Member of Rajya Sabha
- In office 1998–2002

Personal details
- Born: 20 September 1925
- Died: 6 February 2018 (aged 92)
- Party: Indian National Congress
- Profession: Politician

Frida Topno (20 September 1925 – 6 February 2018) was an Indian politician from Odisha.

She was elected as member of Lok Sabha from Sundergarh in Odisha in 10th Lok Sabha in 1991 and 11th Lok Sabha in 1996 as Indian National Congress Party candidate. She died on 6 February 2018 at the age of 92.

She was elected to Upper House of India Parliament - the Rajya Sabha for the term 1998–2002 from Odisha.
