= Sundergarh =

Sundargarh Sundargarh
- Town
- Sundargarh
- Location in Odisha, India Sundargarh (India)
- Coordinates: 22.12°N 84.03°E
- Country: India
- State: Odisha
- District: Sundargarh

Government
  - Member of Parliament: Jual Oram, (BJP)
  - Member of Legislative Assembly: Jogesh Kumar Singh, (BJD)
  - Collector & District Magistrate: Shri Manoj Satyawan Mahajan, IAS
  - Superintendent of Police, Sundargarh: Shri Pratyush Diwakar, IPS, (IPS)
- Elevation: 233 m (764 ft)

Population (2011)
  - Total: 45,036

Languages
  - Official: Odia
- Time zone: UTC+5:30 (IST)
- Postal code: 770XXX
- Telephone code: 06622
- Vehicle registration: OD-16
- Website: https://sundargarh.odisha.gov.in

Sundargarh is a town in Sundergarh district of the Indian state of Odisha. As of the 2011 census, the municipality had a population of 45,036. Sundargarh is recognized as an industrial district in Odisha. Steel, fertilizer, cement, ferrovanadium, machine-building, glass, china-clay plants and factories, and spinning mills are some of the major industries of this district. Sundargarh occupies a prominent position in the mineral map of Odisha and is rich in iron ore, limestone, and manganese.

== Geography ==
Sundargarh is located at 22.12°N 84.03°E. It has an average elevation of 243 metres (801 feet). The Ib river flows along in the north.

== Climate ==
The climate of this district is characterized by extremely hot summers and cool winters. The climate is hot and moist sub-humid. The normal rainfall of the district is approximately 1230 mm.

Climate data for Sundergarh (1991–2020)
Month	Jan	Feb	Mar	Apr	May	Jun	Jul	Aug	Sep	Oct	Nov	Dec	Year
Record high °C (°F)	35.1 (95.2)	41.1 (106.0)	42.0 (107.6)	46.0 (114.8)	46.6 (115.9)	47.6 (117.7)	41.1 (106.0)	36.1 (97.0)	37.6 (99.7)	36.6 (97.9)	37.5 (99.5)	34.8 (94.6)	47.6 (117.7)
Mean daily maximum °C (°F)	28.1 (82.6)	32.0 (89.6)	36.7 (98.1)	40.8 (105.4)	41.2 (106.2)	37.1 (98.8)	31.8 (89.2)	31.6 (88.9)	32.3 (90.1)	32.6 (90.7)	29.9 (85.8)	27.3 (81.1)	33.7 (92.7)
Mean daily minimum °C (°F)	9.7 (49.5)	12.8 (55.0)	17.0 (62.6)	21.7 (71.1)	25.0 (77.0)	24.0 (75.2)	22.3 (72.1)	21.8 (71.2)	21.6 (70.9)	19.0 (66.2)	15.2 (59.4)	10.4 (50.7)	18.7 (65.7)
Record low °C (°F)	1.6 (34.9)	4.5 (40.1)	9.1 (48.4)	11.6 (52.9)	11.1 (52.0)	9.1 (48.4)	10.6 (51.1)	10.6 (51.1)	13.1 (55.6)	12.6 (54.7)	7.4 (45.3)	2.4 (36.3)	1.6 (34.9)
Average rainfall mm (inches)	18.1 (0.71)	13.0 (0.51)	14.7 (0.58)	25.4 (1.00)	36.4 (1.43)	213.0 (8.39)	383.1 (15.08)	383.6 (15.10)	247.5 (9.74)	59.8 (2.35)	12.0 (0.47)	11.1 (0.44)	1,417.5 (55.81)
Average rainy days	1.2	1.3	1.7	2.5	3.2	10.3	16.9	16.8	10.8	3.6	0.6	0.7	69.6
Average relative humidity (%) (at 17:30 IST)	60	51	43	37	39	60	80	82	79	74	68	68	62
Source: India Meteorological Department

== History ==
Sundargarh was the capital of the princely State of Gangpur till 1948 and became the district headquarters of Sundargarh district in 1948. It is understood that, in ancient times, Sundargarh was under the rule of different dynasties. However, divergent views are available regarding the origin of the ruling family. The present royal family of Gangpur belongs to the Sekhar dynasty. This ex-state was under the suzerainty of Sambalpur, known as Hirakhand Desh, and later formed part of the dominion of the Maratha Rajas of Nagpur. This was ceded to the British Government in 1803 by the Maratha Chief Raghuji Bhonsla of Nagpur under the treaty of Deogaon (near Rourkela). This was restored to him by a special engagement in 1806. This was finally ceded in 1826. In 1905, this princely state along with Bonai was transferred from the control of the commissioner of Chhotanagpur to that of the Odisha Division and a separate political agent was appointed.

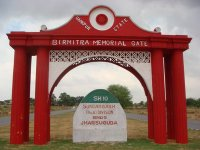

== Demographics ==
As of 2011 India census, the population of the town was 45,036, with 22,754 males and 22,282 females.

== Transport ==
Sundargarh is connected to all major towns in Odisha by road. It is connected to Rourkela and Sambalpur by State Highway 10.

The nearest railway station is Jharsuguda railway station.

The nearest airport is Jharsuguda Airport which is 27 kilometers from the town.

== Politics ==
The current MLA from Sundargarh Assembly Constituency is Jogesh Singh, who won the seat in the general election in 2024 after Kusum Tete, who won the legislative assembly seat in 2019 after Sushama Patel who won the seat by election due to the death of her husband and seating MLA Sankarsan Naik who won the seat in the 2004 general election. Previous MLAs from this seat were Kishore Chandra Patel who won this seat representing INC in 1995 and in 1977, and also representing INC(I) in 1980, and Bharatendra Shekhar Deo who won this seat representing JD in 1990 and representing JNP in 1985.

Sundargarh is part of Sundargarh (Lok Sabha constituency). The current Member of Parliament is Jual Oram from BJP.

== Education ==
There are many schools and two colleges exist in the town. The schools are both private and public, where as both the colleges are government run. The Govt. College is the oldest college in the town (inaugurated in 1958) which provides co-education and the Govt. Women's college accepts only female students.

A medical college is being constructed with the sponsorship of NTPC. The Medical College was taken over by Government of Odisha and renamed as Government Medical College and Hospital with MBBS classes starting from 2022 to 2023 academic session under the leadership of Dean and Principal Professor Dr Daitary Routray.

== Sports ==
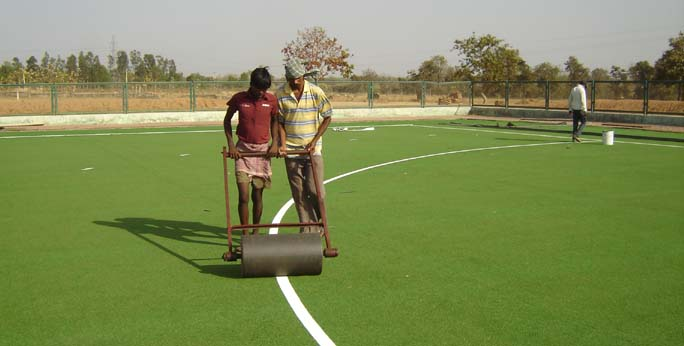
Hockey turf in Sundergarh

A new synthetic (polygrass) hockey turf has been laid at the SAI Sports Complex in Bhawanipur, Sundargarh. This is the third synthetic hockey turf in the district of Sundargarh. The other turfs are at Panposh (Panposh Hockey Hostel) and Rourkela (Biju Patnaik Hockey Stadium). The Sports Authority of India (SAI) had approved the Rs. 2.25 crores project in 2007. The base work for the turf began in 2007, and was completed by May 2008. Then began the wait for synthetic turf, which arrived only in November 2008, and was subsequently laid by February 2009.

== See also ==
- Kendriya Vidyalaya, Sundargarh

== Notable people ==
- Dilip Tirkey - hockey player from Sundergarh
