= Ispat =

Ispat (lit. 'steel' in Indic languages) may refer to:

- Ispat Autonomous College, Rourkela, college in Rourkela, Odisha, India
- Ispat English Medium School, school in Rourkela, Odisha, India
- Ispat Express, Indian passenger train in Odisha
- Ispat Steel, Indian steel company
- Ispat Nagar railway station, railway station in Bokaro district, Jharkhand, India
- Ispat Post Graduate Institute and Super Specialty Hospital, Rourkela, Odisha, India
- Ispat Stadium, cricket stadium located in Rourkela, Odisha, India
