= Ambagan, Rourkela =

Ambagan
- Neighbourhood/Local Market Place in Rourkela
- Market place in Rourkela Ambagan (India)
- Coordinates: 22.2555441°N 84.8628751°E
- Country: India
- State: Odisha
- City: Rourkela
- Ambagan Subdivision: Gajapati Market
- Location: Sector 19
- Languages: Odia, Hindi
- Time zone: UTC+5:30 (IST)
- PIN: 769 002
- Area code: +91 661

Ambagan, also known as Ispat Super Market, is a local market business place located in sector 19 of Rourkela. The place is famous for its various local shops settled around the area with shops ranging from commodities to vegetable markets. Nearby lies Ispat food court where local street food vendor shops are available.
