= Lahunipara Degree College =

Three year college in Lahunipara

- Type: Post-secondary private institution
- Established: 1991
- Location: Lahunipara, Odisha, India

Lahunipara Degree College is private post secondary institution located in the Lahunipara tehsil in Bonaigarh, India.

== See also ==
- Government Autonomous College, Rourkela
- Municipal College, Rourkela
