= Michael Kindo =

Indian field hockey player (1946–2020)

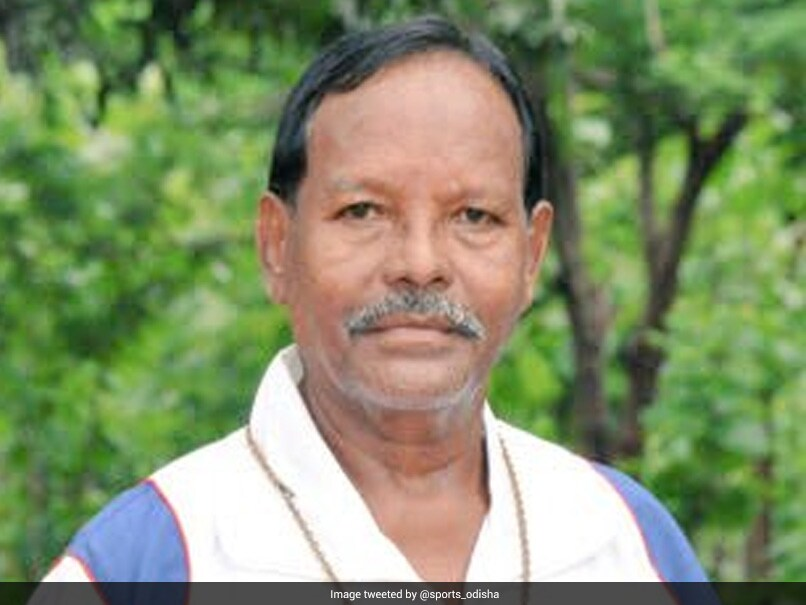

Personal information
- Born: 28 June 1946 Simdega, Jharkhand
- Died: 31 December 2020 (aged 74) Rourkela, Odisha
- Height: 170 cm (5 ft 7 in)
- Weight: 62 kg (137 lb)

Sport
- Sport: Field hockey
- Position: Fullback
Senior career
Years	Team	Caps	Goals
1966-1973	Services	-	-
1978-1980	Odisha (SAIL)	-	-
National team
Years	Team	Caps	Goals
1969-1976	India		-
Medal record
Olympic Games
Bronze medal – third place	1972 Munich	Team
Men's FIH Hockey World Cup
Bronze medal – third place	1971 Barcelona	Team
Silver medal – second place	1973 Amstelveen	Team
Gold medal – first place	1975 Kuala Lumpur	Team
Asian Games
Silver medal – second place	1974 Tehran	Team

Michael Kindo (28 June 1946 – 31 December 2020) was an Indian field hockey player from the tribal belt of Jharkhand. He played at full back defender position and represented India and competed in the 1971 Men's Hockey World Cup, 1972 Summer Olympics, 1973 Men's Hockey World Cup, 1974 Asian Games, 1975 Men's Hockey World Cup. Prior to this he had competed in several local, national and regional competitions. In 1972, he became the first Adivasi sportsperson to be awarded the prestigious Arjuna Award.

Michael was well known for his tackling and dodging skills. He was considered a pioneer in Indian hockey for his no-look pass. According to many of his colleagues, Michael had a clean tackling technique, covered areas well and was a master of ball distribution, which allowed the forwards to play fearlessly. He did the right move at the right time, said former team India captain Ajit Pal Singh. He was known as one of the most dependable team players and was almost never in error in the field. Hockey enthusiasts and his team members frequently remark that Michael was a genuine team player who made solid defense an art form.

== Early life ==
Michael Kindo was born in a village in Bihar(now Jharkhand) on 28 June 1946. He first picked up the hockey stick at RC Boys Middle School in Kurdeg. After he finished his schooling he joined the Indian Navy.

== Career ==
=== Domestic career ===
Michael's career took a serious turn when he joined the navy. In his time in the navy, he got selected for and represented the Services hockey team in the national championships from 1966 to 1973. He won the Best Services Sportsman award in 1971.

=== International career ===
Kindo made his international debut in 1969 representing team India in a test series against Kenya. He was a member of the Indian men's field hockey team in the 1972 Munich Olympics, winning the Bronze medal. He had played in all of the first three world cups. They won Bronze medal in the 1971 world cup; Silver in the 1973 world cup and Gold in the 1975 world cup. He also represented India in field hockey at the 1974 Tehran Asian games.

In the 1975 world cup, Michael injured his ankle and was substituted with Aslam Sher Khan in the semi-finals against Malaysia. Khan's efforts dragged India into the finals and Kindo lost his spot in the starting 11 against Pakistan in the final match. The ankle injury denied him a place at the 1976 Montreal Olympics, but Michael shortly quit his international career after the team's dismal performance brought India down to 7th place.

=== Later Work ===
Michael joined SAIL hockey at Rourkela in and represented Odisha state in the nationals from 1978 to 1980. He used to hold tournaments for children in his village in Jharkhand. Michael was also a State Team Selector for Odisha in the 1993 Bikaner national championship. He coached hockey at the SAIL Hockey Academy (SHA) at Rourkela, and was responsible for the installment of an artificial turf at the academy.

== Retirement and legacy ==
Kindo quietly retired into his Rourkela home, where he lived with his wife and his son's family. In 2010, when he came to the Delhi world cup, he was put through ordinary security checks, unrecognizable by anybody in the crowd. Michael supported the 2011 merger of Hockey India and the Indian Hockey Federation. In the 2012 Olympics, he was upset seeing India's performance at London, Michael criticized and demanded immediate removal of coach Nobbs.

Michael Kindo died on 31 December 2020 at Ispat General hospital due to age-related illnesses. According to his family, he was bedridden for quite some time and was suffering from depression. On Thursday, 1 January 2021, his body was brought from the morgue to the Rourkela hockey stadium for the public to pay their respects and was also bestowed upon with the Guard of Honour by the district police. His body was then taken to Hamirpur church and was laid to rest in the church graveyard.

Michael Kindo still remains a tribal icon who instilled the aspiration of tribal hockey all over Gumla-Sundergarh tribal belt. This region is considered a conveyer belt of hockey players today. Former Team India captain and a student of Michael's, Dilip Tirkey said that the 2023 World Cup being hosted in Rourkela was made possible by Kindo. According to Tirkey, even though Michael stopped playing decades ago, he never left his association with hockey. Kindo's colleagues from the 1975 gold team used to call him as kindi bhai; they say that he never let the team's spirit go down. Among his team members, he was known as the gentleman defender who was calm-headed, clean-hearted and simple but was very effective in game. According to Ajit Pal, "We were an attacking side and a lot of us could do that fearlessly because we knew there were players like Michael defending our goal". Michael was one of the first tribals to represent independent India and is the only one to win a world cup. In his honor still today a famous hockey tournament is run by St Mary´s School in the district of Simdega, known as ´Michael Tournament´.

He protected the goal like he protected the territorial waters as an Indian Navy officer.

— Ashok Kumar

=== Laurels ===
List of all medals won and awards received

- Best Services Sportsman award — 1971
- Third place, Barcelona Men's Hockey World Cup — 1971
- 3rd position (Bronze), Munich Summer Olympics — 1972
- Arjuna Award — 1972
- Runner-up, Amstelveen Men's Hockey World Cup — 1973
- 2nd position (Silver), Tehran Asian Games — 1974
- Winner, Kuala Lumpur Men's Hockey World Cup — 1975

Source: Times of India, Stick2Hockey
