= List of schools and colleges in Rourkela =

This is a list of educational institutions in the Indian city of Rourkela, Odisha.

== Schools ==
* Rastriya Vidyalaya High School (RVHS), Near Daily Market, Rourkela-1
- Guru Nanak Public School, Sector-21, Nayabazar, Rourkela (English Medium)
- Loreto English School, civil township, Rourkela
- Desouza's School
- Indo English School, Birsa Dahar Road
- Ispat English Medium School
- Kendriya Vidyalaya Rourkela, Sector-6
- Pragati Vidya Mandir, Jagda
- Saraswati Vidya Mandir, Birsa Dahar Road (English Medium)
- Rourkela Higher Secondary School, Sector -4 & Sector -7
- Saint Arnold School, Kalunga, Rourkela
- Saint Paul's School, Hamirpur, Rourkela
- Carmel School, Hamirpur, Rourkela
- Guru Tegh Bahadur Public School, Sector-18, Rourkela
- Gyanjyoti Public School, Sector-19, Rourkela
- Delhi Public School, Sector-14, Rourkela
- Deepika E.M. School, Sector-5, Rourkela
- Shri Aurobindo School, Sector-5, Rourkela
- Saint Thomas School, Chhend, Rourkela
- Kalinga Public School, Sector-2, Rourkela
- Kanak Manjari International School, Chhend, Rourkela
- Saint Gregorious School, Kalunga, Rourkela
- Saint Joseph's Convent School, Hamirpur, Rourkela
- Saraswati Shishu Vidya Mandir, Sector-6, Rourkela
- Saraswati Shishu Vidya Mandir, Jagda, Rourkela

== Colleges ==
- National Institute of Technology, Rourkela
- Padmanava College of Engineering, Rourkela
- Purushottam School of Engineering and Technology, Mandiakudar
- Rourkela Institute of Management Studies, Rourkela
- Rourkela Institute of Technology, Kalunga
- Rourkela College, Rourkela -2 (Sector-4)
- Rourkela Govt. Auto. College, Panposh
- S. G. Women's College, Rourkela (Sector-2)
- Ispat Auto. College, Rourkela
- Ispat Vidya Mandir, Sector-19, Rourkela
- Municipal College, Rourkela
- H. K. Ray College, Chhend
- Neelashaila Mahavidyalaya, Jagda
- Kalyani Ray College, Rourkela
- Gandhi Mahavidyalaya, Rourkela
- Priyadarshini Women's College, Rourkela
- College Of Arts Science and Technology, Bondamunda
- Gayatri +3 Science and commerce college, Rourkela
- Chaitanya college, chikatmati, Rourkela

== Universities ==
- Biju Patnaik University of Technology
- National Institute of Technology, Rourkela

== See also ==
- List of institutions of higher education in Odisha
- List of schools in Odisha
