= Rourkela Municipal Corporation =

Municipal Corporation in city of Rourkela, Odisha, India

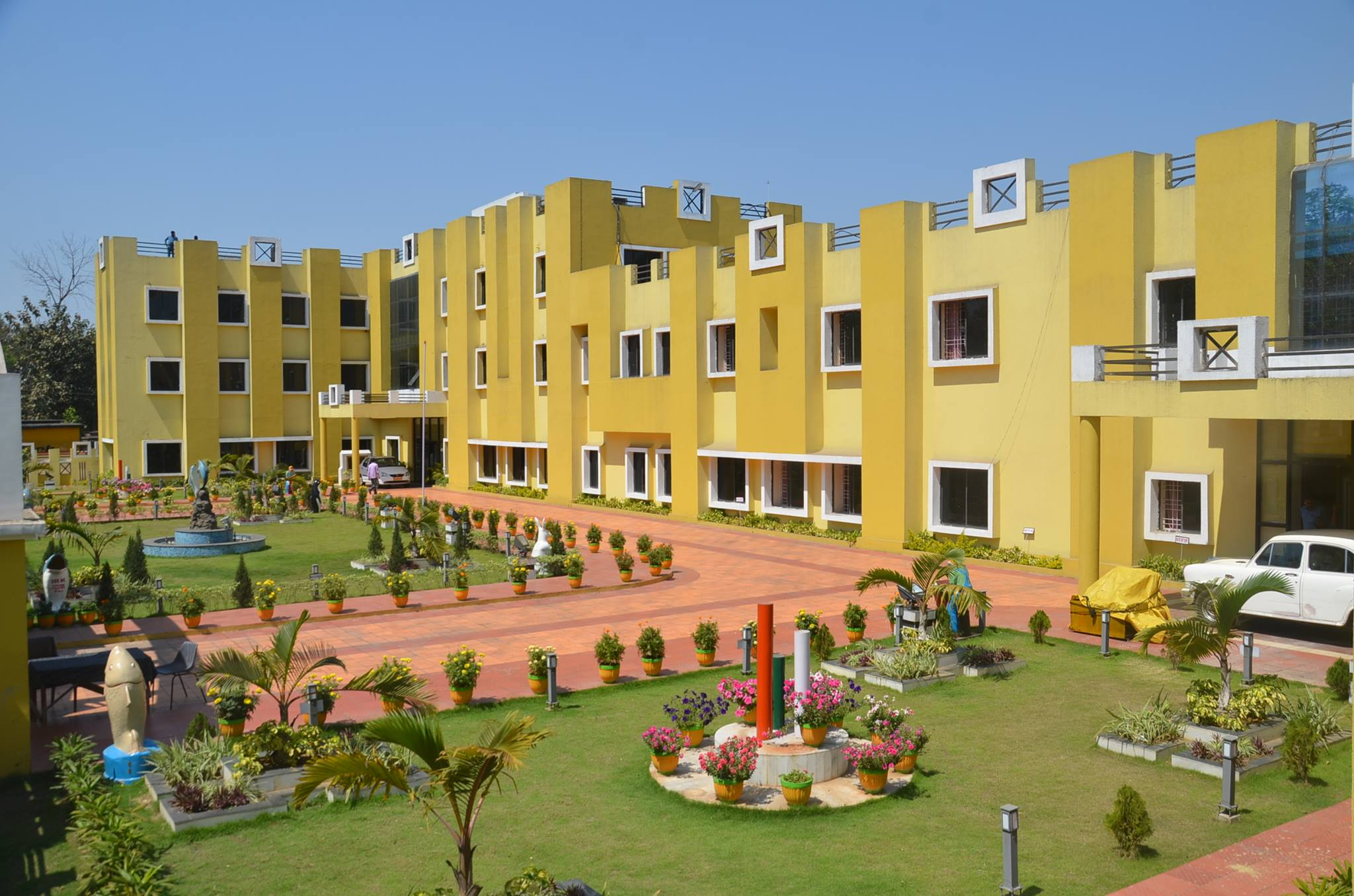

Type
- Type: Municipal Corporation

History
- Founded: 2014

Leadership
- Administrator: Subhankar Mohapatra
- Municipal Commissioner: Dheenah Dastageer, IAS
- Seats: 40

Motto
- Progress through Partnership for better Rourkela

Website
- Official website

Rourkela Municipal Corporation (RMC) is the local civic body responsible for the administration of Rourkela, a major industrial city in Odisha, India. Established as a municipal corporation in 2014, it governs the city’s civil township and expanded urban areas across 40 wards. Headquartered in Uditnagar, the RMC is led by a Mayor and a Municipal Commissioner. It oversees essential services, including urban planning, sanitation, and public health, while playing a critical role in the National Smart Cities Mission.

== History and administration ==
Rourkela Municipal Corporation was formed to improve the infrastructure of the town as per the needs of local population. Rourkela Municipal Corporation has been categorised into wards and each ward is headed by councilor for which elections are held every 5 years.

Rourkela Municipal Corporation is governed by mayor and administered by Municipal Commissioner Dr. Subhankar Mohaptra.

== Functions ==
Rourkela Municipal Corporation is created for the following functions:

- Planning for the town including its surroundings which are covered under its Department's Urban Planning Authority.
- Approving construction of new buildings and authorising use of land for various purposes.
- Improvement of the town's economic and social status.
- Arrangements of water supply towards commercial, residential and industrial purposes.
- Planning for fire contingencies through Fire Service Departments.
- Creation of solid waste management, public health system and sanitary services.
- Working for the development of ecological aspect like development of Urban Forestry and making guidelines for environmental protection.
- Working for the development of weaker sections of the society like mentally and physically handicapped, old age and gender biased people.
- Making efforts for improvement of slums and poverty removal in the town.

== Revenue sources ==
The following are the Income sources for the corporation from the Central and State Government.

=== Revenue from taxes ===
Following is the Tax related revenue for the corporation.

- Property tax.
- Profession tax.
- Entertainment tax.
- Grants from Central and State Government like Goods and Services Tax.
- Advertisement tax.

=== Revenue from non-tax sources ===
Following is the Non Tax related revenue for the corporation.

- Water usage charges.
- Fees from Documentation services.
- Rent received from municipal property.
- Funds from municipal bonds.

== See also ==
- List of municipal corporations in India
