= South Rourkela =

South Rourkela is an area of the steel city Rourkela in Orissa state, India. In 2024, seven small slums in South Rourkela were merged with Rourkela Municipal Corporation.

== Major inhabitations ==
The major inhabitations of South Rourkela are

- Fertilizer Township
- Jalda
- Balijhudi(lower & upper)
- Tangarpalli
- I.D.L Colony/DesaiNagar
- Nabakrushna Nagar
- Utkal Nagar
- Tarapur
- Sonaparbat
- Gopabandhu Nagar
- Modern India
- Construction Colony
- Britannia Colony
- Rehabilitation Colony
- F.F. Colony
- R.H. Colony
- Auto Colony
- Labour Colony
- Jajabar colony
- Deogaon
- Dharamdihi
- Bhanja Colony
- Lokanath Market

== Education ==
=== Schools ===
- Ispat English Medium School
- Pragati Public School
- Ispat Lower Secondary School
- Sonaparbat high school
- Jalda High School
