= Bibhu Mohapatra =

Fashion designer

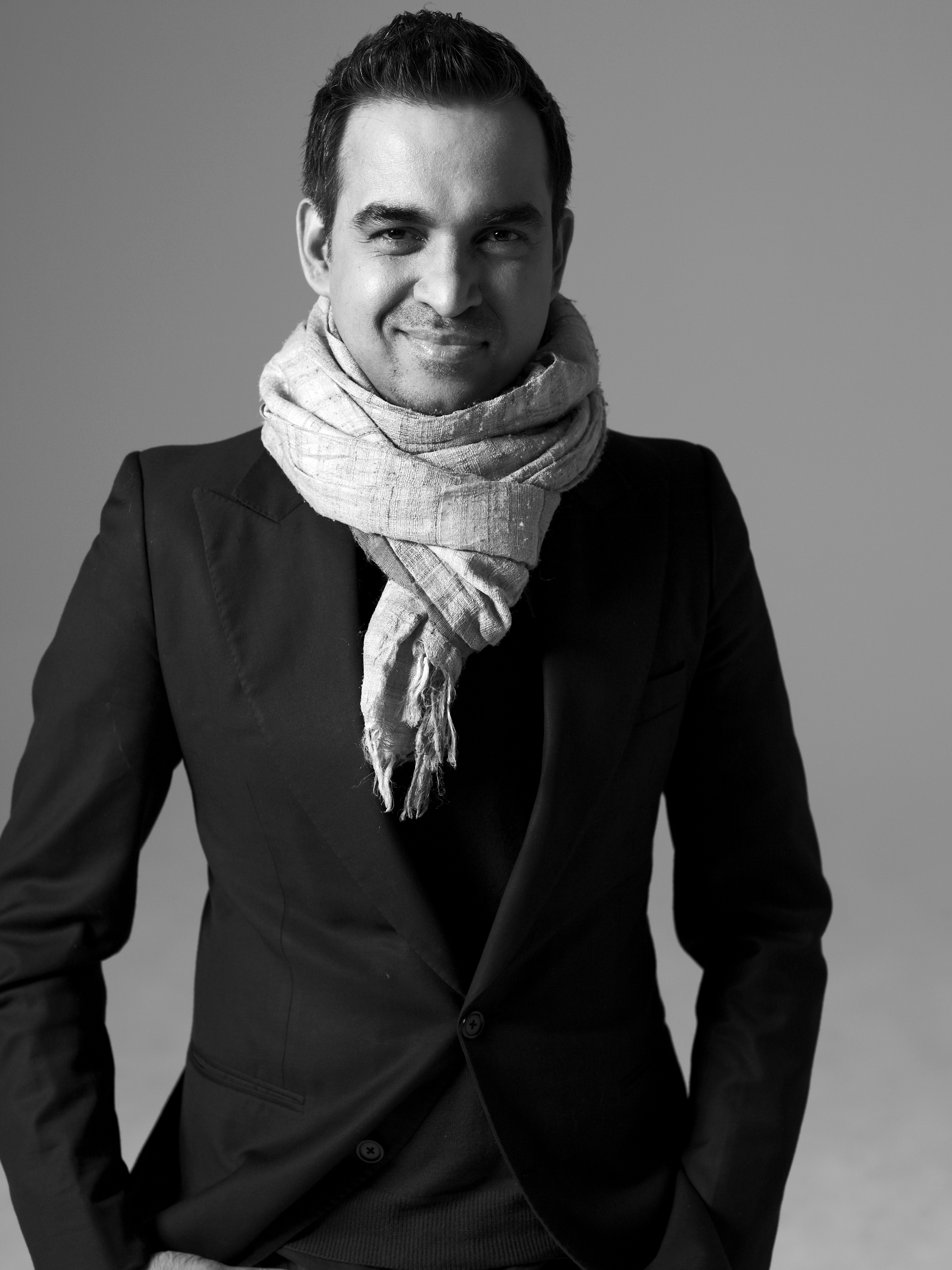
- Fashion designer
- Born: 7 June 1972 (age 53); Rourkela, Odisha, India
- Citizenship: United States
- Education: Fashion institute of Technology
- Occupation: Fashion designer
- Known for: Luxury womenswear, fine jewelry and costumes
- Label: Bibhu Mohapatra
- Spouse: Robert Roane Beard
- Website: www.bibhu.com

Bibhu Mohapatra (born 7 June 1972 in Rourkela, Odisha, India) is a New York-based fashion designer and costume designer.

== Early life and education ==
Mohapatra grew up in Rourkela, Odisha, on the East Coast of India. As a young man, his mother helped him learn how to sew on her sewing machine and he used vintage textiles, such as saris, to learn the craft. In 1996, he moved to America and earned a master's degree from Utah State University. In 1999, he moved to New York City and enrolled at the Fashion Institute of Technology. He worked with Halson and J. Mendel.

== Career ==
In 2008, Mohapatra resigned from J. Mendel after a 10 year career creating the Mendel ready to wear collections, in order to establish his label, Bibhu Mohapatra -Purple Label. Bibhu has presented hundreds of collections of luxury women's ready to wear, couture and fur under his brand mostly in New York, Mumbai, New Delhi, Frankfurt, Beijing, Houston, Palm Beach, Tampa, Houston, Mexico, and Costa Rica. His collection is sold in his boutique in New York City and are available in exclusive boutiques globally and online.

Mohapatra was the costume designer for the Verdi opera Aida debuted during the 2012 Summer season at the Glimmerglass Opera in Cooperstown, NY. Bibhu was invited to design Costumes for the post covid reopening of The Washionton National Opera at Kennedy Center in Washington DC in 2021 in honor of Supreme Court Justice Ruth Bader Ginsberg.

First Lady Michelle Obama is a client of Mohapatra's, he has expressed he feels she reflects his designs well.

On the charitable front, Bibhu designed several collections of hand woven silk sari to help the traditional hand weavers in his home state of Odisha in India. Bibhu is a co-founder of The India Society. The India Society is a New York-based organization set up to assist students of fashion and fine art with tuition and internships at US based Universities.

Mohapatra Launched a collection of diamond jewelry in 2016.

Mohapatra lives and works in New York City. His retail store and Atelier is located at 174 Duane Street in the TriBeCa, Manhattan New York

His creations have been featured in many fashion magazines including In Touch Weekly. DNA, New York, Time, Forbes, The Wall Street Journal, Marie Claire, Gotham, and Vogue.

Mohapatra's Spring 2021 collection was inspired by Amrita Sher-Gil.

== Awards and honors ==
- On May 27, 2010, Mohapatra received the "Young Innovator Award" from the National Arts Club.
- In June 2010, he was elected a member of the Council of Fashion Designers of America.
- In April 2013, SCAD Atlanta presented the exhibition "Surface" by Bibhu Mohapatra, an exhibition encompassing work from many seasons.
- In June 2013, Mohapatra was a finalist for the 2014 International Woolmark Prize.

== See also ==
- Indians in the New York City metropolitan area
