= Rourkela =

- City
- Raurkela
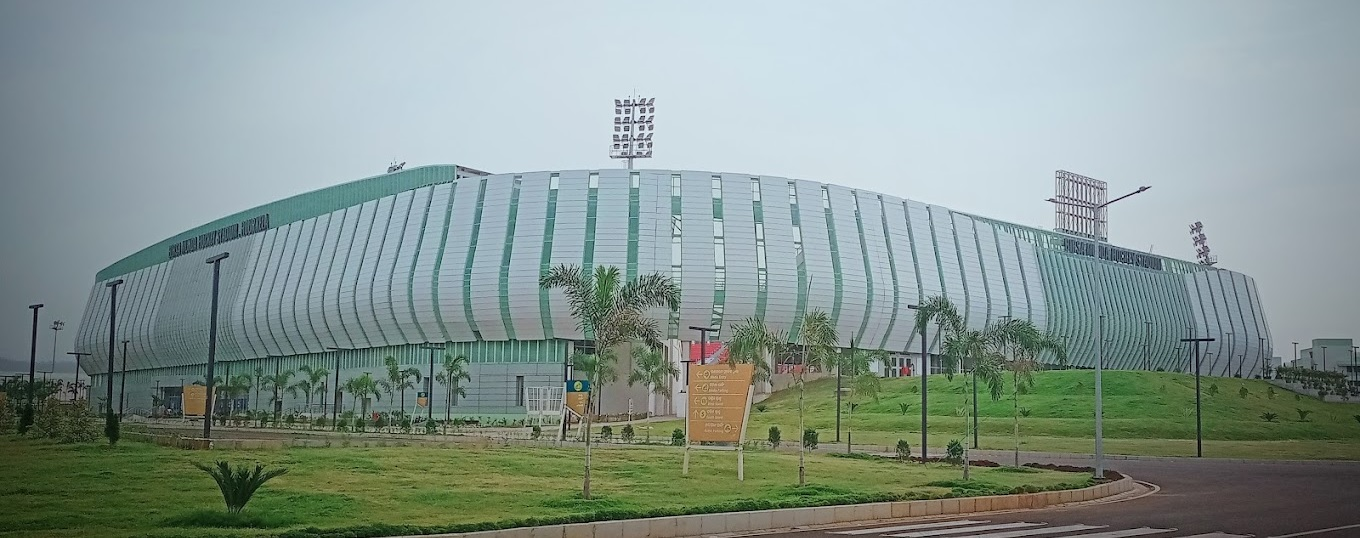
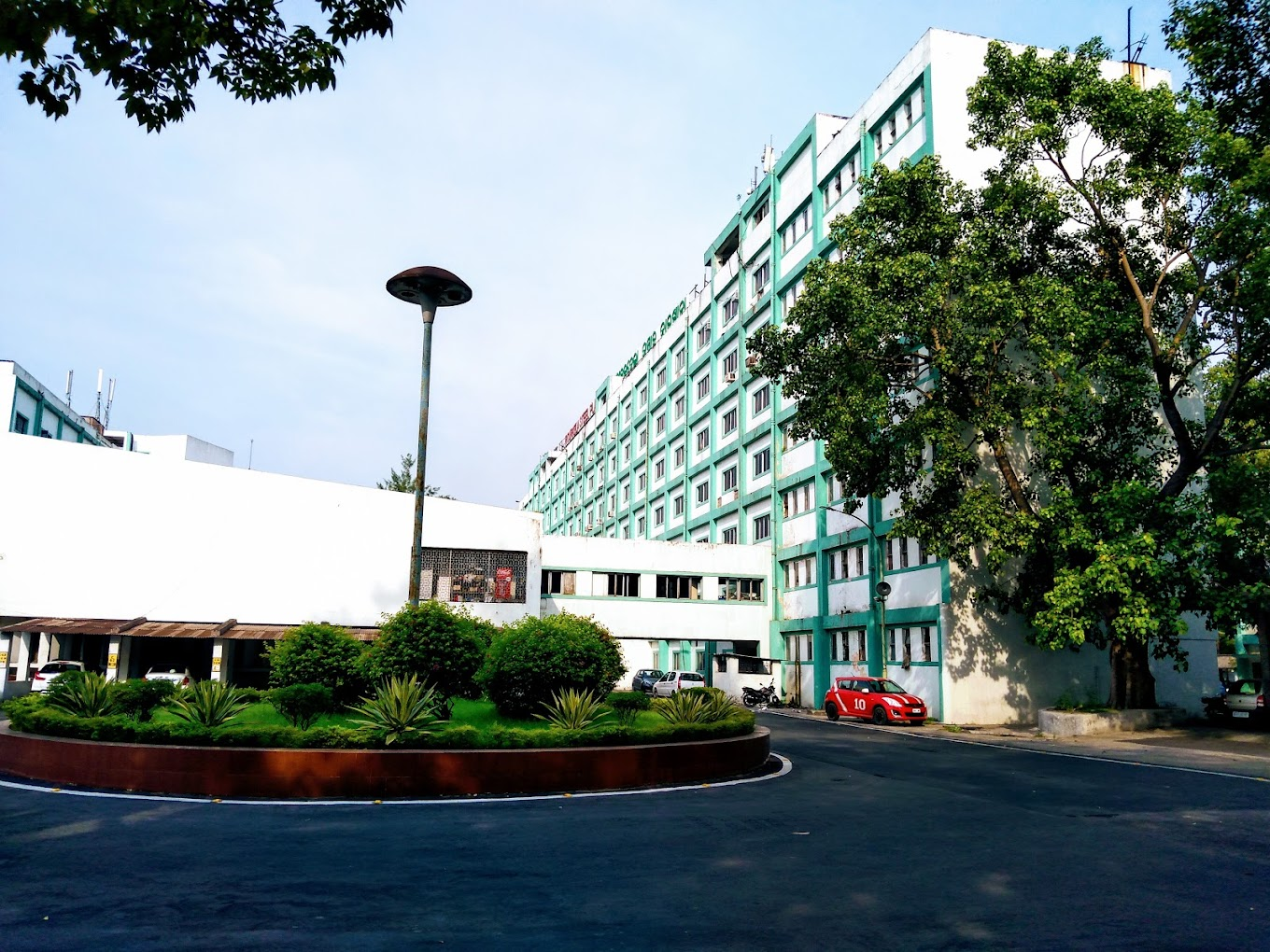
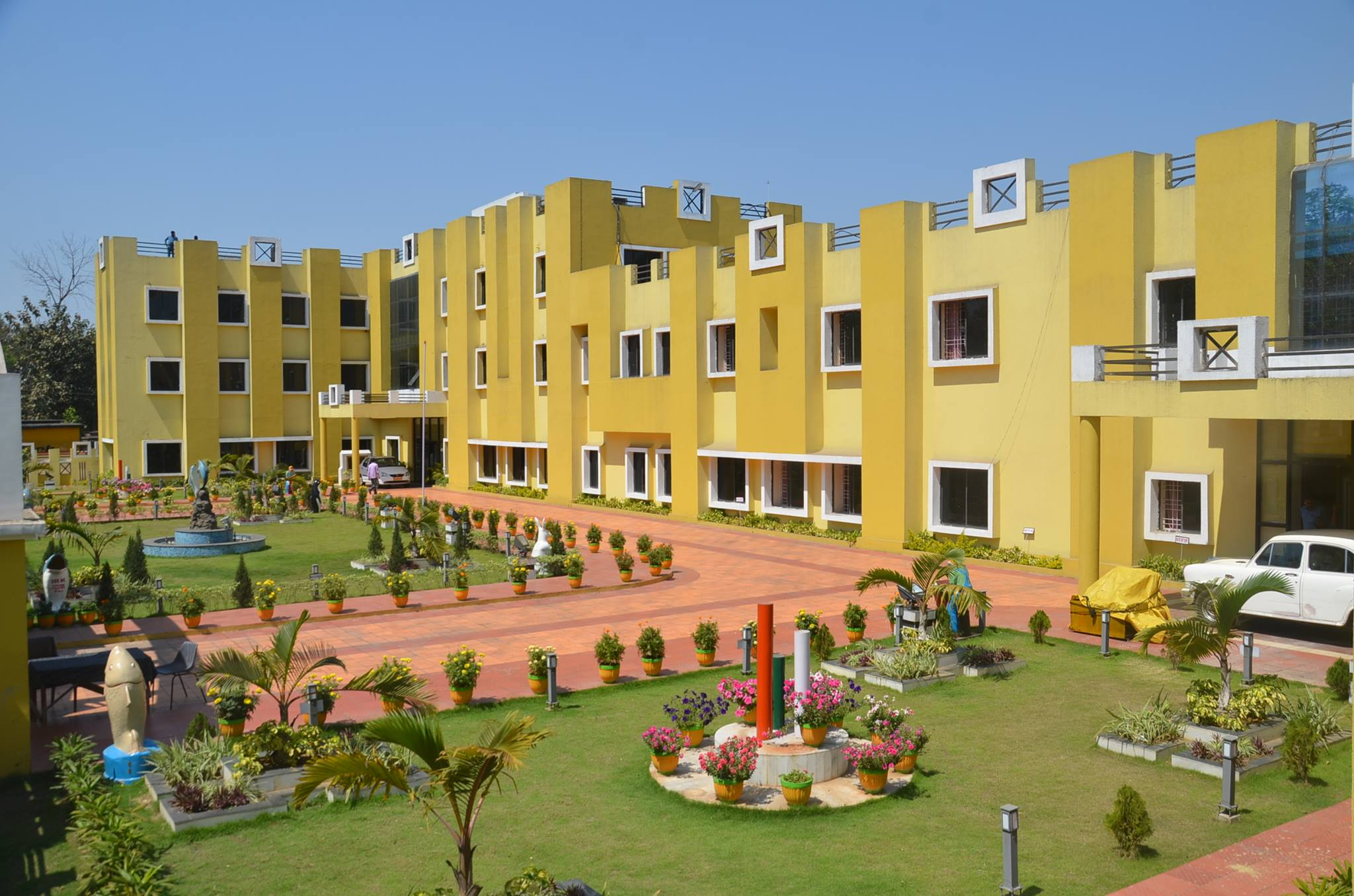
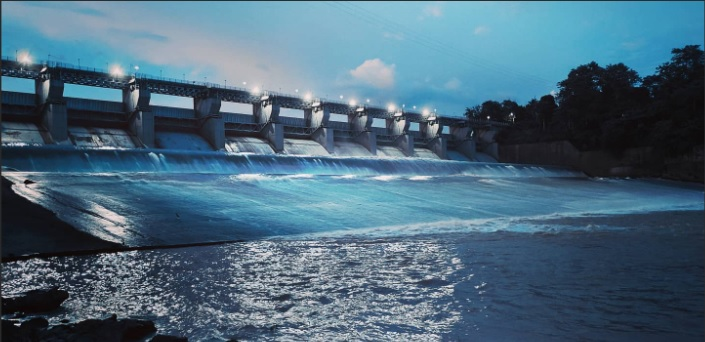
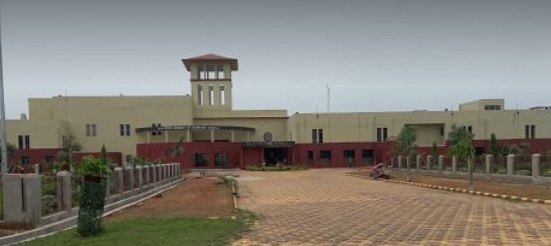
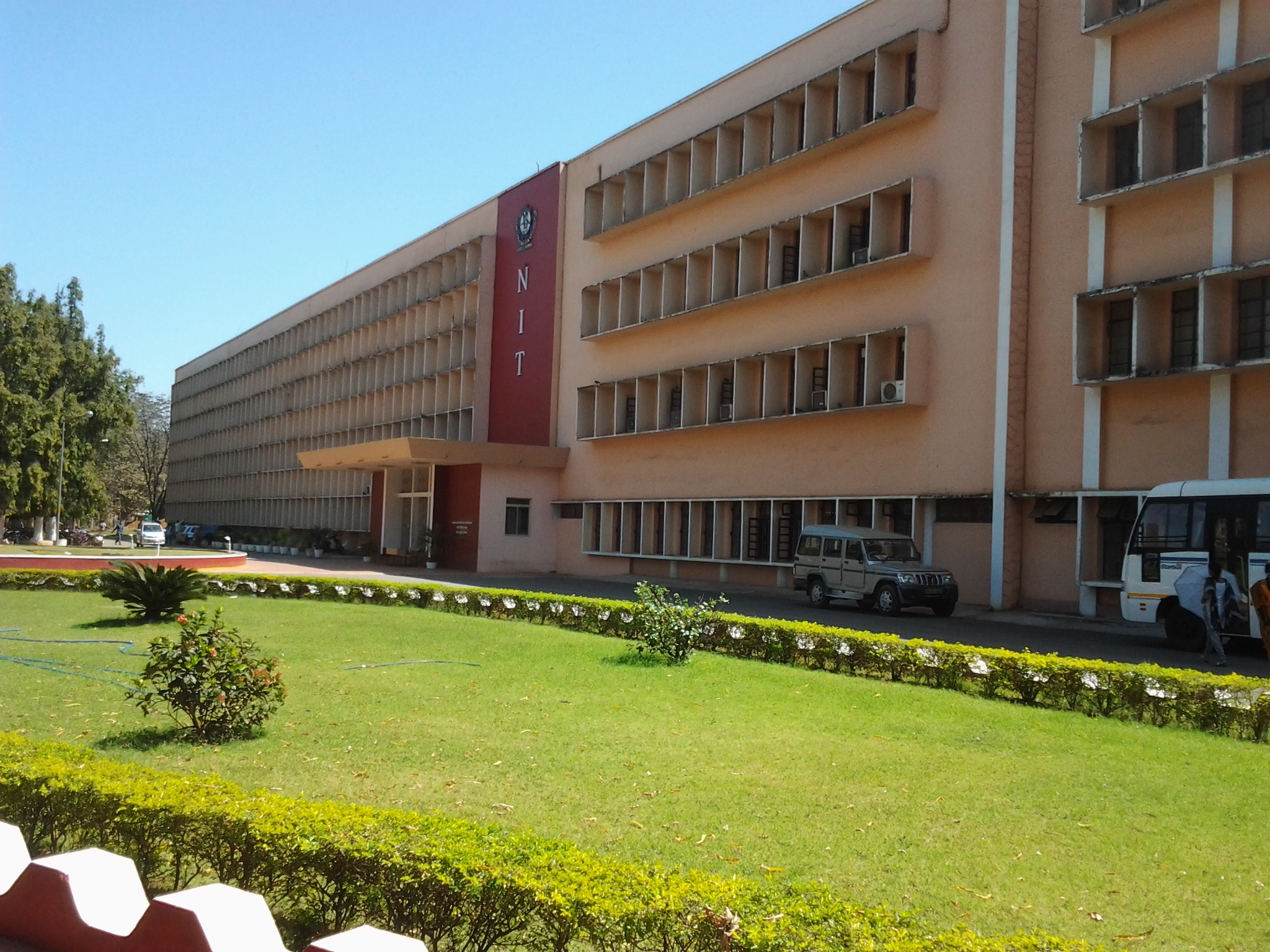
- Birsa Munda International Hockey Stadium Rourkela Steel Plant Rourkela Municipal Corporation Mandira Dam BPUT NIT Rourkela
- Nicknames: "Steel City", "Ispat Mahanagar", "Engineering Hub", "Industrial Capital of Odisha"
- Location in Odisha, India Rourkela (India)
- Coordinates: 22°14′57″N 84°52′58″E
- Country: India
- State: Odisha
- District: Sundargarh
- Established: 3 March 1954

Government
  - Type: Municipal Corporation
  - Body: Rourkela Municipal Corporation
  - Member of Legislative Assembly: Shri Sarda Prasad Nayak, (BJD)
  - Mayor: Vacant
  - Municipal Commissioner: Ms Dheenah Dastageer, IAS
  - SP of Rourkela Police District: Shri Nitesh Wadhwani, IPS

Area
  - City: 150 km^{2} (58 sq mi)
- Elevation: 218.23 m (716.0 ft)

Population (2011)
  - City: 536,450
  - Rank: India 80th, Odisha 3rd
  - Density: 6,504/km^{2} (16,850/sq mi)
  - Metro: 273,317
- Demonym(s): Rourkelite; Rourkelia

Languages
  - Official: Odia and English
- Time zone: UTC+5:30 (IST)
- PIN: 769001-769017
- Telephone code: 0661
- Vehicle registration: OD-14
- UN/LOCODE: IN RRK
- Website: www.rmc.nic.in

Rourkela (Odia: [ɾauɾɔkela]) officially Raurkela is a planned city located in the northern district Sundargarh of Odisha, India. It is a Tier-2 city and the third-largest city in Odisha after Bhubaneswar and Cuttack. It is situated about 328 kilometres (204 mi) west of the state capital Bhubaneswar and is surrounded by a range of hills and encircled by the rivers Koel, Sankha, and Brahmani. The city is also popularly known as Ispat Nagar and Steel City of Odisha.

The town has one of the largest integrated steel plants set up with German collaboration Known as Rourkela Steel Plant, of Steel Authority of India Limited (SAIL). It also has one of the premier national level technical institute known as National Institutes of Technology (NIT Rourkela). Every year, on 3 March Rourkela Day has been celebrated. The city has been selected as smart city in the third phase of the National Smart Cities Mission on 20 September 2016, which is to drive economic growth and improve the quality of life of people by enabling local area development. Rourkela has been declared India's Fastest Moving City (East Zone 2–10 Lakh). Rourkela is third largest city of Odisha state and categorised as a Tier-2 city.

== History ==
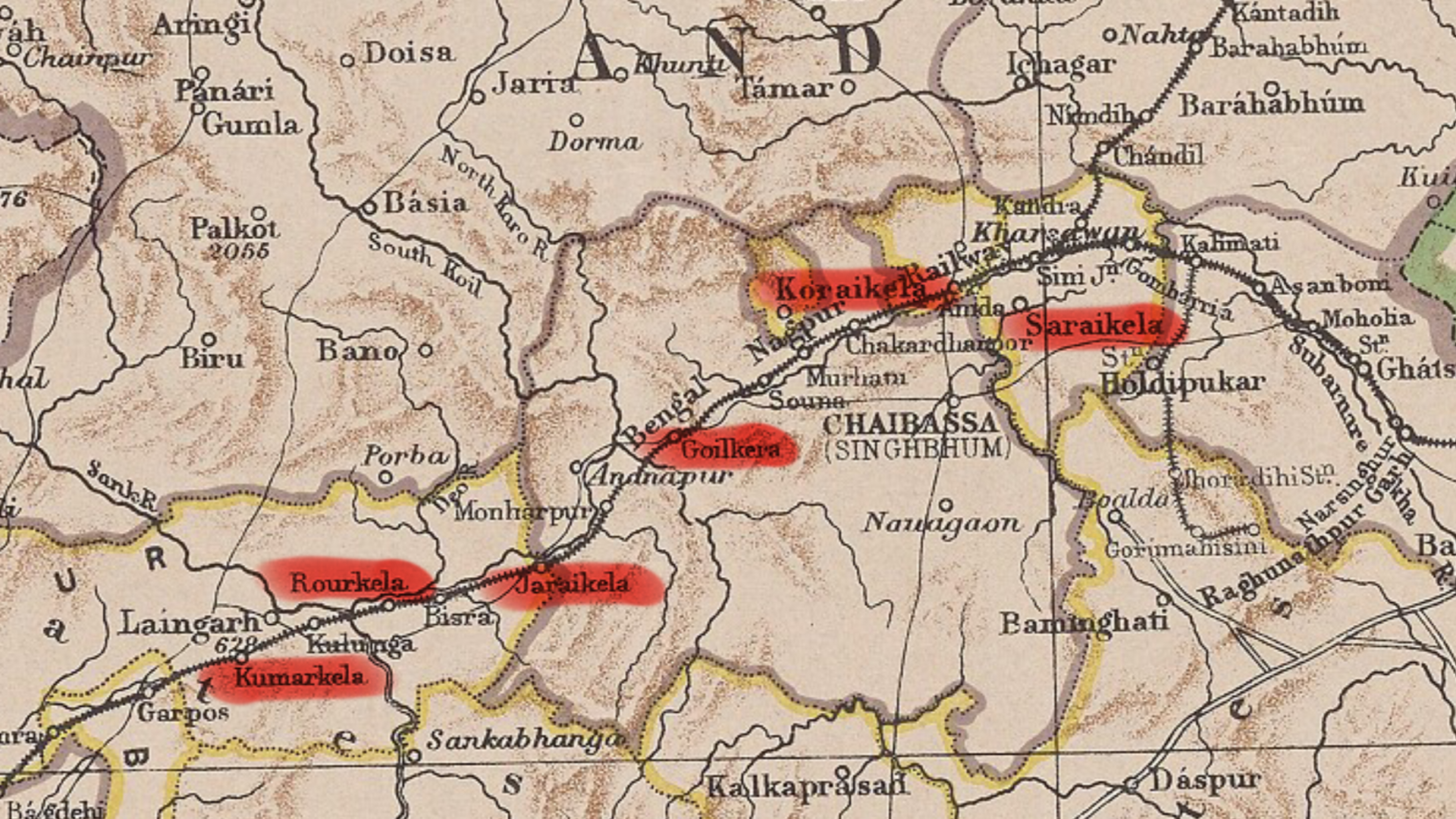
Kela toponymy of the lower Chota Nagpur

In the local Sadri language Rourkela means "Your village" (Rour = Your & Kela comes from the word "Kila" which means village). It comes under Sundergarh district of the Indian state of Odisha.

The twin towns of Rourkela and Fertilizer Township, as well as their developed periphery, are located in areas that were once covered by dense forests.

India's first public sector steel plant facility was established in Rourkela with the help of German businesses Krupp and Demag. In the late 1950s and early 1960s, the town was the largest German colony outside Germany.

Following India's independence, Pandit Jawaharlal Nehru, the first Prime Minister of India, wanted to make India an industrialized state in Soviet model of social development; giving wings to his dreams, Sri Biju Pattanaik convinced Pandit Nehru to consider the location of Rourkela for setting up a steel plant. The mineral-rich zone of Rourkela intersected by the rivers Brahmani, Koel and Sankha from two sides was aptly chosen for the same.

The preliminary survey for the steel plant at Rourkela was started in 1952 and the Government of Odisha issued a gazette notification on 16 February 1954. In accordance with the notification, the Government of Odisha acquired an area of about 80 square miles around Rourkela for the purpose of Steel Plant. The German private companies Krupp and Demag came forward to provide financial and technical help for the proposed steel plant at Rourkela. Krupp built Rourkela Steel Plant drawing from experience from its own works in Essen, Germany. The technical experts of the company advised the Government of India as well as the Government of Odisha for acquiring more land. As a result, a further area of 32 square kilometres was acquired out of 31 revenue villages. Almost 13,000 people in 2,424 families lost their dwelling. Later further 4,500 ha (11,000 acres) of land were acquired out of 31 revenue villages for the construction of Mandira Dam, a water embankment. Moreland was requisitioned for the purpose of constructing railway lines to Hatia and Barsuan. The construction of the Bondamunda Railway junction required the further acquisition of land which resulted in 20,000 people's displacement from their habitat. Though there was initial discontentment among the tribals about the land acquisition the authority largely resolved the land dispute, as many of the tribals were provided employment and accommodation. The displaced tribals were relocated to places such as Jalda, Jhirpani, Bisra, and Bondamunda. Their new settlement even extended beyond the river Koel.

Thousands of technical personnel from West Germany came to Rourkela to extend their technical assistance. Some of these Germans came with their family and their small diaspora created the 'Indo-German Club' to socialise. The club exists today with a well-stocked library known as Max Muller library. There are a plethora of local stories of Germans social encounters with tribals (local Adivasis) and people from other parts of India who had relocated themselves to Rourkela for employment. A large part of this population was from coastal and western Odisha who were trained by the German workforce to adapt to the steel plant's technology rigour. The steel plant, which was hugely surrounded by forest, many times witnessed wild animals straying into the plant area. A royal Bengal tiger's lugubrious death in the steel plant's massive blast furnace is a part of the city's folklore. There were also tales about the disappearance of Germans in the nearby Vedvyas cave and the dread whirlpool of river Koel. The river still accounts for human casualty as some day-trippers' wade into the water unaware of the maelstrom.

== Geography ==
Rourkela is located at 84.54E longitude and 22.12N latitude in Sundergarh district of Odisha at an elevation of about 219 m (719 ft) above mean sea level. The area of Rourkela is 200 square kilometers approximately. Being situated on the Howrah-Mumbai rail track, Rourkela had an added advantage of the steel plant being set up there. Red and laterite soils are found here which are quite rich in minerals. The area near Rourkela is rich in iron-ore hence a steel plant is situated in Rourkela. Bolani and Barsuan are the two most prominent mines situated near the town. Rourkela is situated in a hilly region. A small hill range named Durgapur Pahad runs through the heart of the city dividing it into plant area and the steel township. The name "Durgapur" comes from an old village that existed at the foothills long time ago before the plant was set up. The South Koel River and Sankha rivers meet at Vedvyas, Rourkela and flow as a single river called Brahmani.

== Climate ==
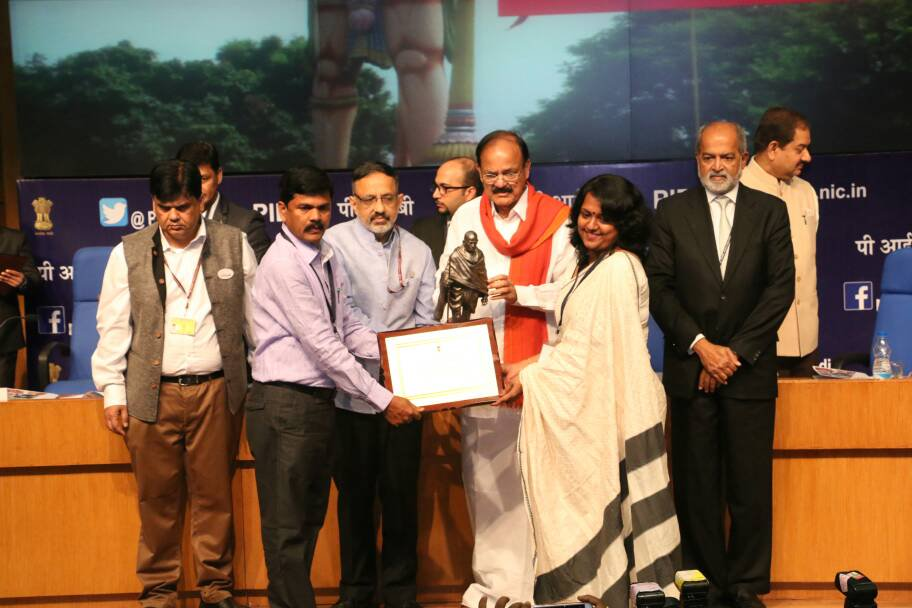
RMC Commissioner and Rourkela ADM taking the award from Shri M. Venkaiah Naidu

Rourkela has a tropical climate and receives high rainfall during Southwest monsoon (June – September) and retreating Northeast monsoon (December – January). Average annual rainfall ranges between 160 and 200 cm.

The minimum and maximum temperatures are in the range of 5 C to 49.7 C with a mean minimum and maximum temperature range of 12.0 C to 31.5 C during coldest and hottest months. Thirty six percent of the geographical area of the district has semi-evergreen or tropical dry deciduous forest.

Rourkela has been ranked 12th best "National Clean Air City" under (Category 2 3-10L Population cities) in India.

Climate data for Rourkela, Odisha
Month	Jan	Feb	Mar	Apr	May	Jun	Jul	Aug	Sep	Oct	Nov	Dec	Year
Mean daily maximum °C (°F)	27.0 (80.6)	29.6 (85.3)	34.9 (94.8)	39.3 (102.7)	41.4 (106.5)	37.2 (99.0)	31.3 (88.3)	31.1 (88.0)	31.5 (88.7)	31.1 (88.0)	28.6 (83.5)	26.8 (80.2)	32.5 (90.5)
Mean daily minimum °C (°F)	8.2 (46.8)	14.4 (57.9)	18.9 (66.0)	23.7 (74.7)	27.0 (80.6)	26.8 (80.2)	25.0 (77.0)	24.9 (76.8)	24.6 (76.3)	21.5 (70.7)	12.4 (54.3)	6.0 (42.8)	19.5 (67.0)
Average rainfall mm (inches)	13 (0.5)	20 (0.8)	19 (0.7)	15 (0.6)	40 (1.6)	221 (8.7)	416 (16.4)	419 (16.5)	218 (8.6)	56 (2.2)	8 (0.3)	3 (0.1)	1,448 (57)
Source: en.climate-data.org

== Economy ==
Rourkela is the industrial capital of Odisha (Formerly Orissa). Rourkela, with a population more than 6 lakhs and the first place in India to house of 1.8 MT integrated steel plant, and with joins the IT world through STPI. STPI has already set up and dedicated earth station in Rourkela to welcome the IT entrepreneurs. There are number of small to large manufacturing industries for economic activity in and around the city.

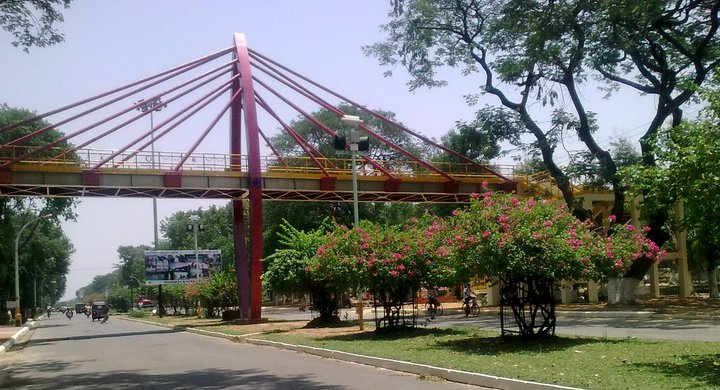
Suraksha Path Bridge near IG Park

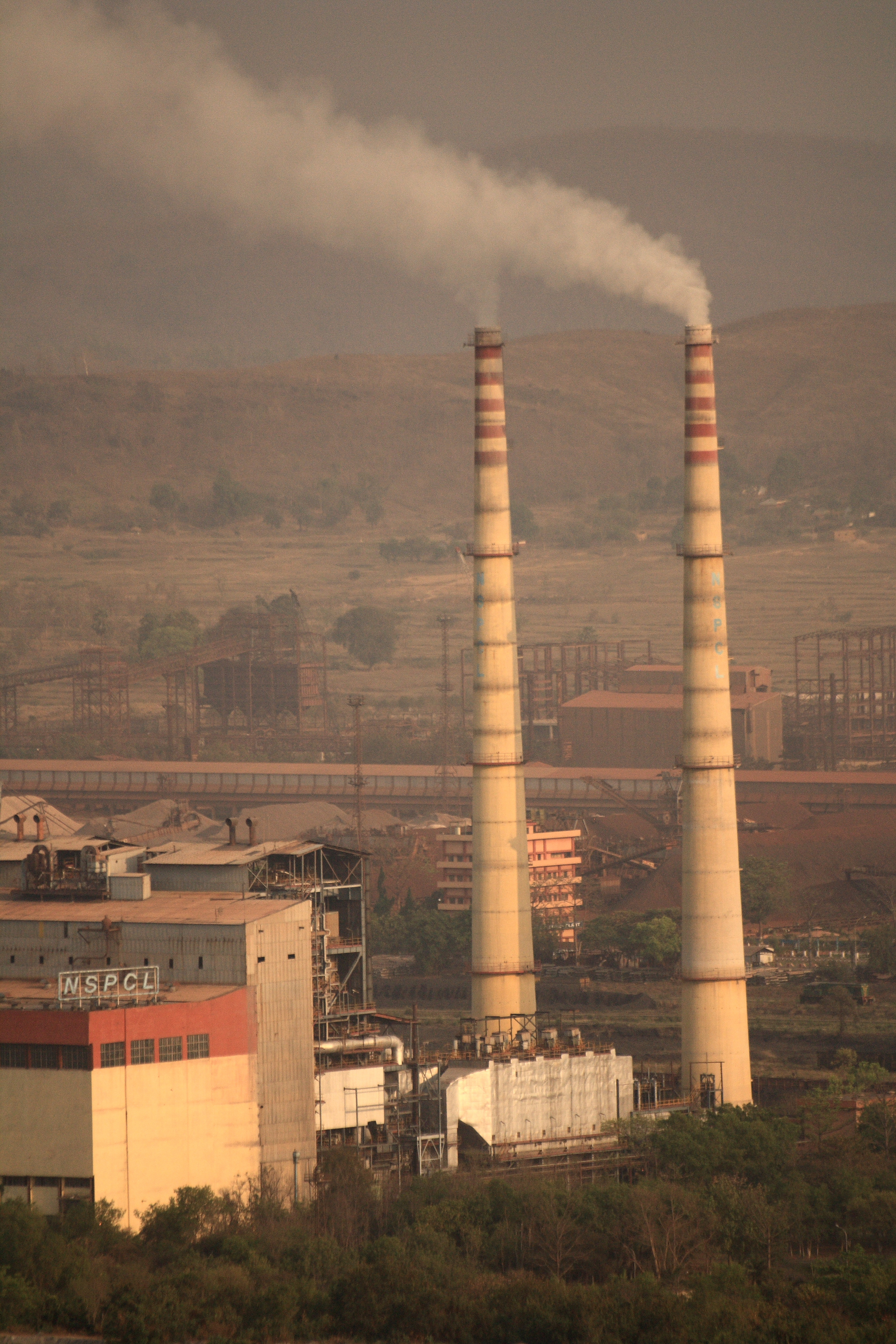
NSPCL

- Steel Authority of India - Rourkela Steel Plant (RSP)
- NTPC-SAIL Power Company Limited, (NSPCL) Rourkela
- OCL India Limited in Rajgangpur
- Larsen & Toubro Fabrication Plant in Kansbahal
- Kalunga Industrial Estate
- Bondamunda-Rourkela Locomotive Shed (Indian Railway)
- Software Technology Parks of India, Rourkela

== Administration ==
=== City layout ===
The Rourkela city is divided into two separate townships under the Census of India as Steel Township and Civil Township. The Residential quarter's colony of Rourkela Steel Plant having eighteen sectors on record is called Steel Township and the other part is called Civil Township. One smaller township Fertiliser was renamed sector-22, as this township is within the purview of SAIL.

Steel Township is a modern industrial habitation mostly residential quarters, characterised by extensive green coverage under the Steel Plant Administration. A number of artistically crafted monuments not only add significant grace to the landscape of the township but also showcase the innovative usage of steel for creating objects of art.

The 16 km long Ring Road connects eighteen sectors and some major parts of the steel city including Chhend Colony, Civil Township, Udit Nagar, Basanti Nagar, Koel Nagar, Jagda, Jhirpani, Panposh, Fertiliser Township, Hamirpur, and Vedvyas.

The steel city is divided mainly into two separate townships under Census of India as Steel Township and Civil Township. The Steel Township is a modern industrial habitation under the Steel Plant Administration, while the other sections are under the Rourkela Municipal Corporation. Some rural areas of South Rourkela are managed by the Jalda Panchayat.

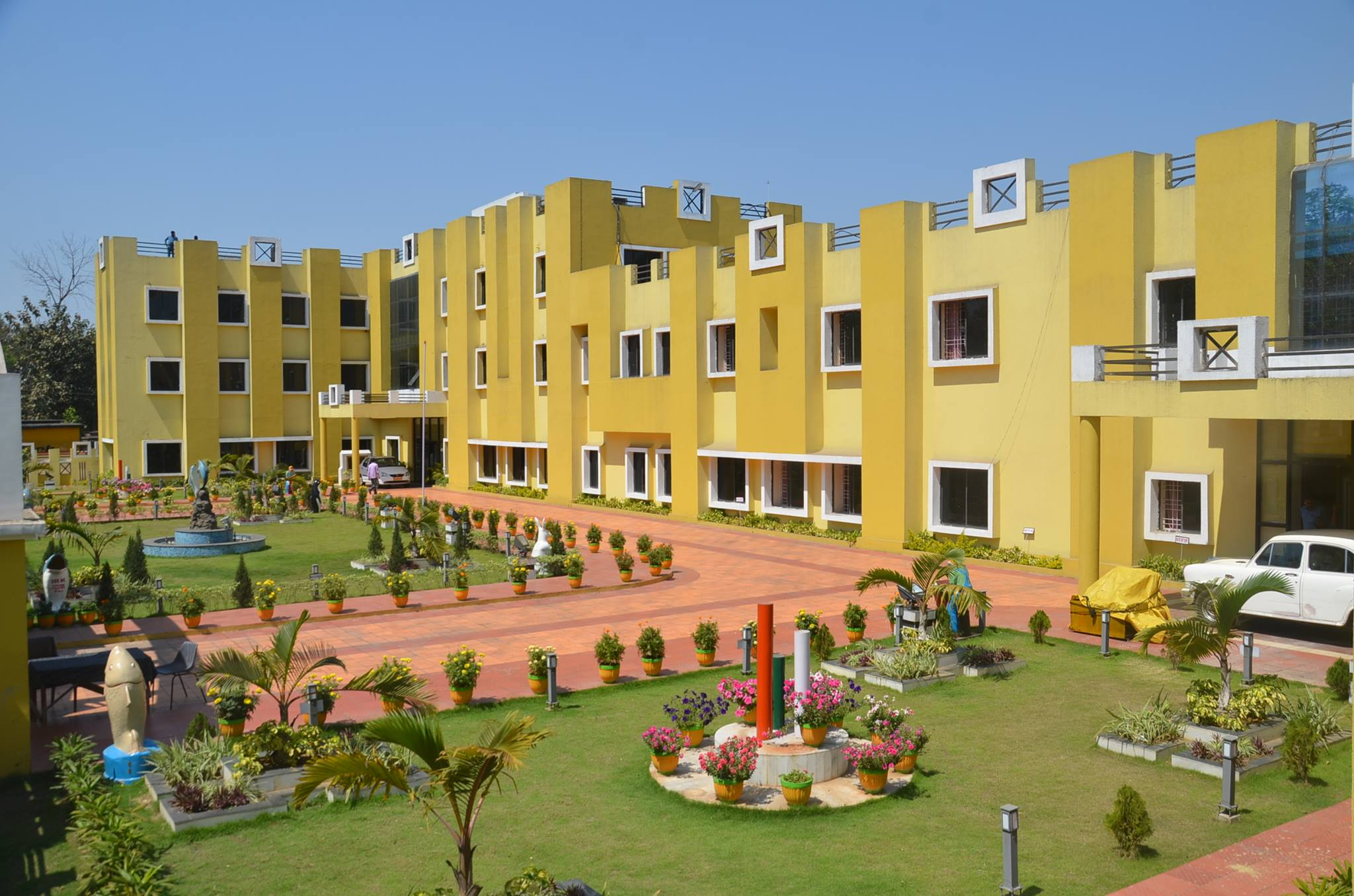
Rourkela Municipal Corporation

Rourkela Municipal Corporation was declared as Municipal Corporation in November 2014. The civic body that governs the overall large section of Rourkela and look after the civic and infrastructural needs of the citizens.

Rourkela Development Authority was created by the Govt. of Odisha in the year 1995. The main objective of RDA is to undertake works pertaining to Construction of Housing Colony, Shopping Complex, Industrial Estate and to provide public amenities also undertake for Improvement & clearance of slums and re-development programmes in a planned manner.

Rourkela Smart City Limited city has been selected as smart city in the third phase of smart city list in September 2016. The objective is to promote city that provide core infrastructure and give a decent quality of life to its citizens, a clean and sustainable environment and apply ‘smart solutions'.

Central Water Commission has its sub-divisional headquarters near Panposh.

== Demographics ==
Historical population
Year	Pop.	±%
1951	15,562	—
1961	90,287	+480.2%
1971	172,502	+91.1%
1981	322,610	+87.0%
1991	398,692	+23.6%
2001		—
2011	536,450	—
Census figures include Rourkela Municipality, its outgrowth, industrial area, and nearby regions. Source: Secondary data from Census of India

According to the census report of 2011, Rourkela has a population of 483,038 (Rourkela Industrial Township is 273,217 and Rourkela Town is 210,412) and the urban metropolitan area population is 536,450. Then railway station of Rourkela was within the revenue village of Mahulpali.

As of 2011 India census, Rourkela Metropolitan Area had a population of 536,450. Males constitute 54% of the population and females 46%. Rourkela has an average literacy rate of 75%, higher than the national average of 59.5% male literacy is 81%, and female literacy is 69%. In Rourkela, 12% of the population is under 6 years of age.

=== Religion ===
Religions in Rourkela City (2011)
Religion	Percent
Hinduism	83.69%
Christianity	7.40%
Islam	6.09%
Others (Sarna)	1.07%
Sikhism	0.87%
Other* or not stated	0.88%
*Others include Buddhists, Jains, and those of

- Total population (2011 census) – 552,970
- Density of population – 6,696 per km^{2}. approx.
- Sex Ratio – 835 female per 1,000 male
- Per capita income – Highest in Odisha

=== Language ===
Languages spoken in Rourkela city (MC + ITS) (2011)
1. Odia (53.13%)
2. Hindi (16.97%)
3. Sadri (7.17%)
4. Urdu (4.71%)
5. Bengali (4.32%)
6. Mundari (2.24%)
7. Telugu (1.63%)
8. Kurukh (1.37%)
9. Bhojpuri (1.36%)
10. 'Other' Hindi (1.10%)
11. Santali (1.08%)
12. Punjabi (0.96%)
13. Others (3.96%)

The main language is Odia. Hindi is spoken by a large part of the city. The local languages of the district, Sadri, Mundari and Kurukh, are spoken by a minority. Migrants from other parts of India speak Urdu, Telugu, Bhojpuri and Punjabi.

== Transportation ==
=== Road transportation ===
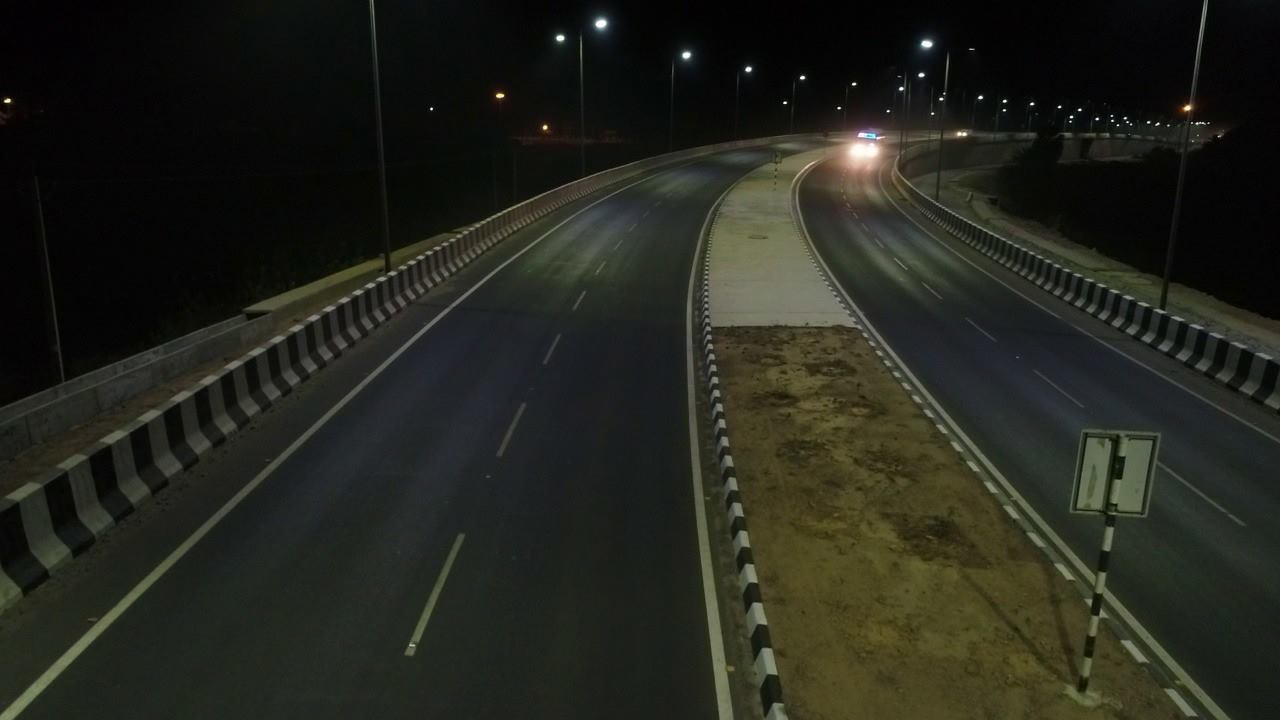
Biju Expressway

Towards the end of 1946, most of the existing roads of the Sundargarh District were constructed. One National Highway i.e. (NH-143) passes through Rourkela which runs from Chas-Ranchi-Rourkela-Barkote-Banarpal – Junction with (NH-55). About 30 km of this highway passes through in and around Rourkela. Though the finalization of the project is awaited the planning for four linings of this highway is under consideration. One more National Highway i.e. NH – 215 which runs from Rajamunda (in Sundergarh district) to Panikoili in Jajpur district.

Other than this the SH-10 which runs from Rourkela to Sambalpur is another good road used in a large way particularly after its renovation and up gradation in 1995. This highway has recently been upgraded to a four-lane highway under the Biju Expressway project. There are a number of other departmental roads in and around Rourkela stretched in different parts. From a civic point of view, the Steel City consists of two parts i.e. Steel Township and Civil Township. While the ring road constructed by Rourkela Steel Plant Authority which has surrounded the Steel Township the other part of the ring road is Civil Township. The Steel Township roads are also maintained by the RSP authority. There are a number of daily Bus Services from Rourkela to different parts of Orissa and also, a few, to neighboring states like Chhattisgarh and Jharkhand. There are a number of city buses plying daily on different routes in the city. The new Bus Terminus at Uditnagar, Rourkela constructed by Rourkela Development Authority caters to various demands of Bus services to different parts of the states. Other than the New Bus stand, there are a number of tickets booking counters in different parts of the city for the public to book tickets for various destinations. In 2014, Government of Odisha decided to build Biju Expressway stretching from Rourkela to Jagdalpur.

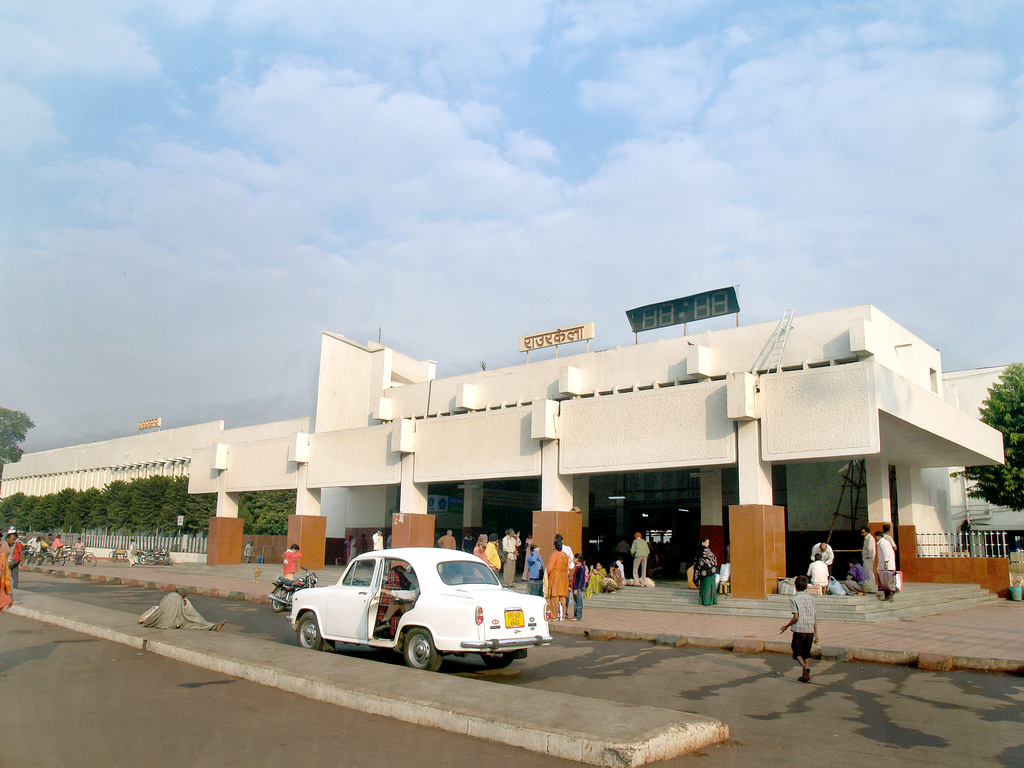
Rourkela Railway Station

=== Railways ===
Rourkela Railway junction is situated on the Howrah-Mumbai line under Chakradharpur division of South-Eastern Railway. Apart from Rourkela Station, the other stations in Sundargarh District are Bondamunda, Panposh, Rajgangpur, Kalunga, Kansbahal, etc. The city is well connected through Railway to Howrah & Mumbai. Apart from this, the city enjoys direct connectivity to Delhi, Chennai, Bangalore, Ranchi, Ahmedabad, & Pune and other major city's' of India. Rourkela is a profit-generating junction under South-Eastern Railway and from Rourkela junction, one line also goes to Biramitrapur whereas two from Bondamunda towards Howrah and Hatia respectively. One more line goes from Bimalagarh to Kiriburu.

Bondamunda Loco Shed: Two locomotive sheds, one for steam locomotives and the other for diesel locomotives, was set up in the year 1950s. An electric locomotive shed was started in 1983 to accommodating WAM-4 locomotives, which is now accommodates 242 electric locomotives after expansion.

=== Airport ===
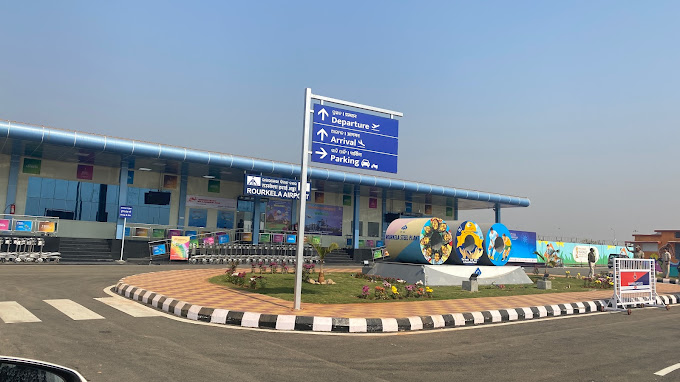
Rourkela Airport Terminal

Rourkela Airport is a public airport serving Rourkela, Odisha, India. It is located near Chhend, which is 6 km west of the city center. The airport's terminal is being upgraded under UDAN scheme. The airport is capable of handling ATR-72 type aircraft, an apron for parking of two aircraft at a time and a general aviation terminal.

The license for commercial usage of the airport was issued in January 2019, which handle commercial flights and traffic, the airport upgradation project involving expansion of the runway from 1,765 m to 1,930 m to handle larger aircraft, like ATR-72 and De Havilland 8-400 aircraft, construction of a new apron, a parallel taxiway to the runway, a new passenger terminal building and a perimeter wall was taken up by the Airports Authority of India.

== Health care ==
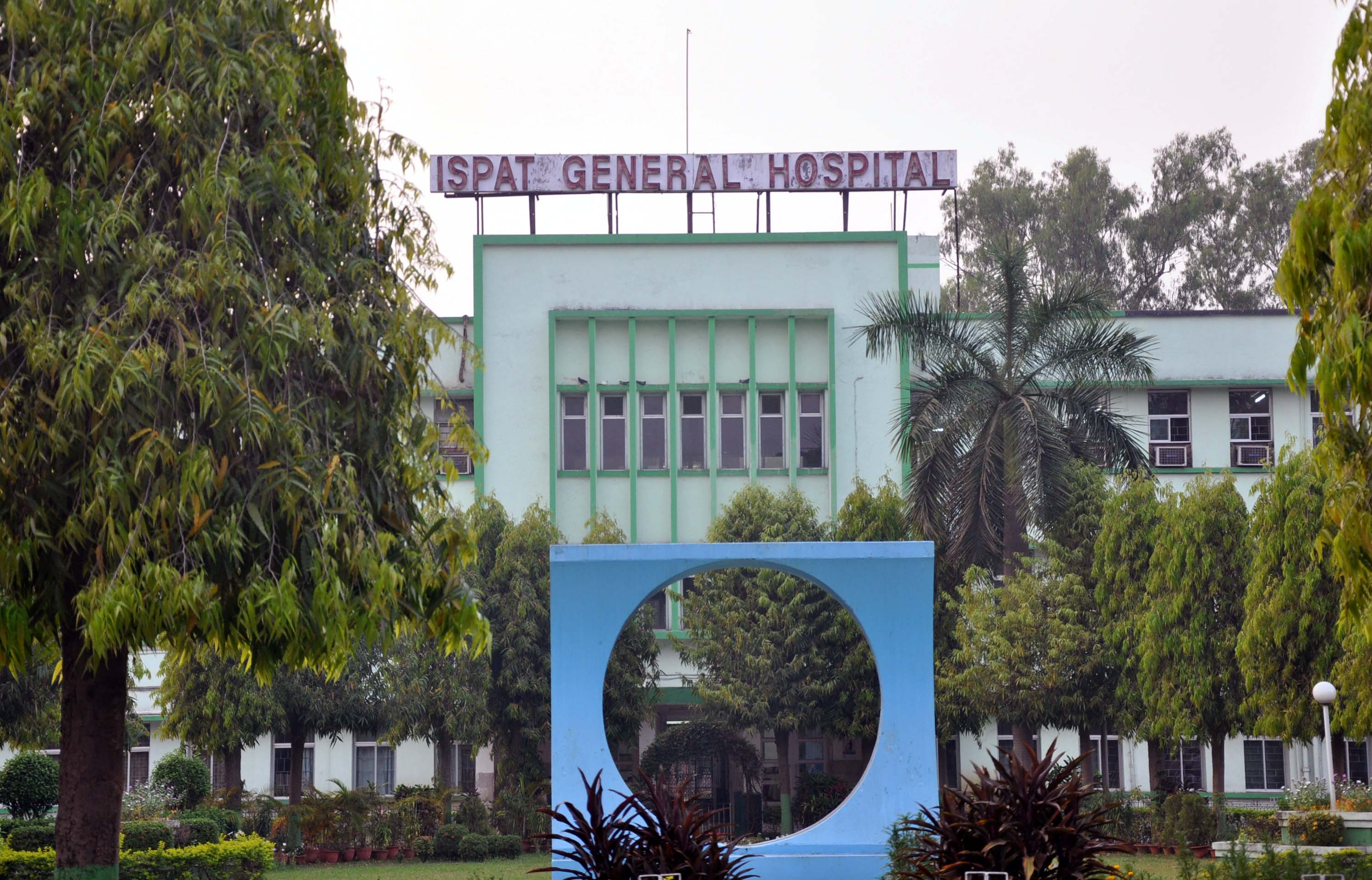
Ispat General Hospital

There are a number of hospital facilities in Rourkela. People from different parts of Odisha and other states for seeking better health care access and treatment. Major medical facilities in the city are Ispat General Hospital, Jaiprakash Hospital, & Rourkela Govt. Hospital.

1. Ispat General Hospital
2. Rourkela Government Hospital
3. Super Speciality Hospital
4. Shanti Memorial Hospital
5. ESIC Model Hospital
6. Sub Divisional Hospital, Panposh
7. Lifeline Hospital
8. Community Welfare Society Hospital
9. Vesaj Patel Hospital
10. Lions Eye Hospital
11. Hi-Tech Medical College & Hospital
12. Jaiprakash Hospital and Research Centre, Uditnagar
13. Jaiprakash Hospital (Main Campus), Dayanand Nagar, Vedvyas
14. Apollo Hospital near IGH sector -19

== Tourism and recreation ==
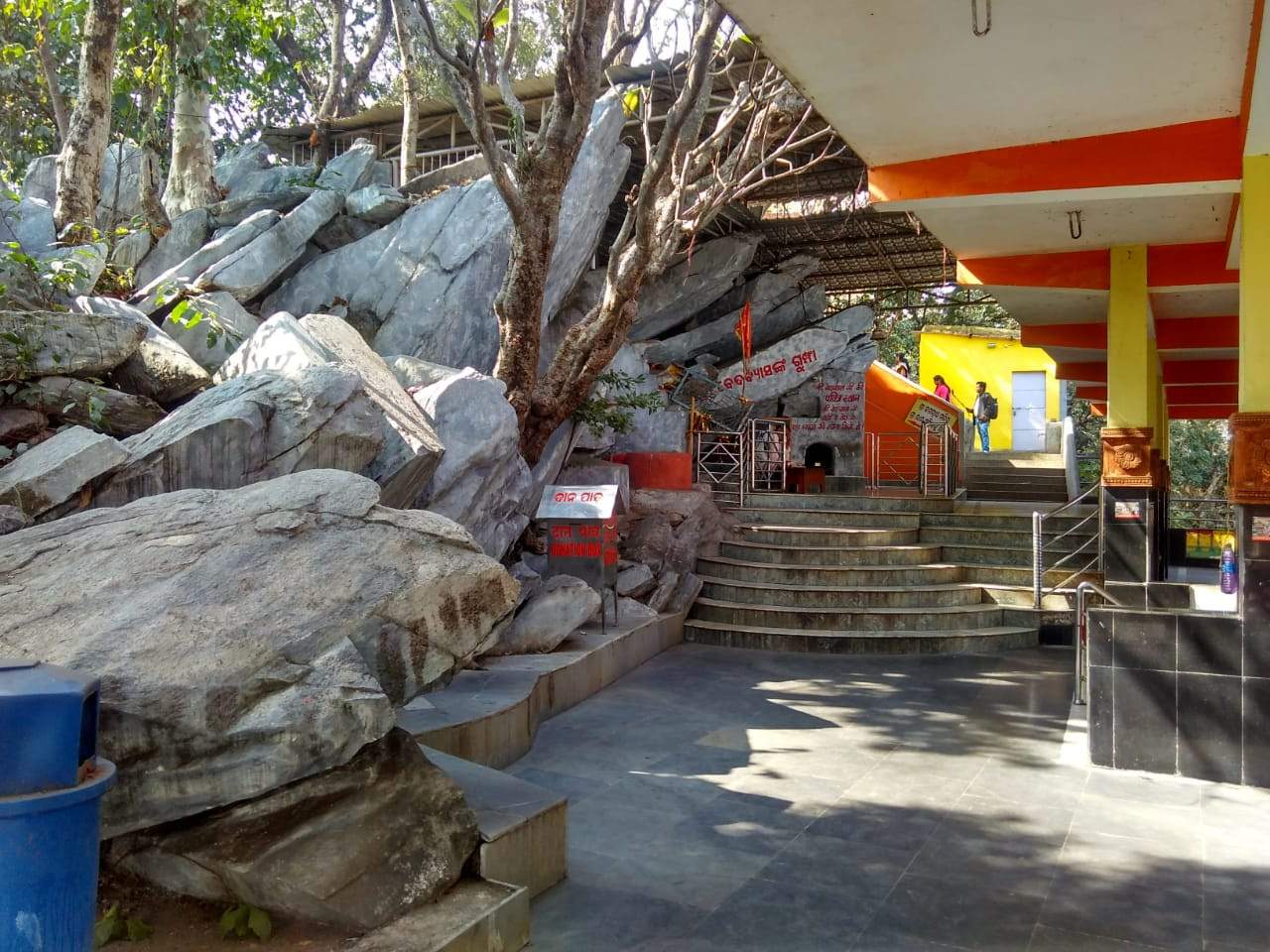
Vedvyas

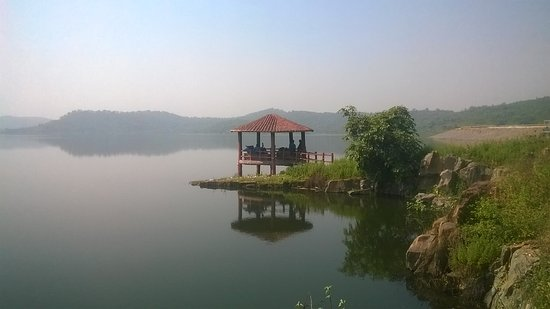
Pitamahal Dam

Rourkela has three major recreation parks in Steel Township area. These are Indira Gandhi Park, Jubilee Park, and Ispat Nehru Park Udyaan along with the recently inaugurated Community Park at Civil Township and many other small parks in Civil Township area.

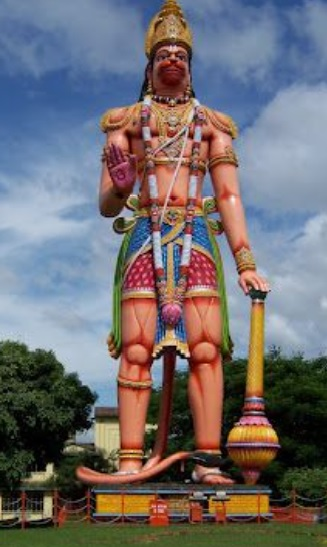
Hanuman Vatika

Hanuman Vatika is a sprawling campus of area surrounding of 5.2 ha (13 acres). The statue of Hanuman is constructed with the height of 23 m (75 ft) in the year of 1994.

There are also a number of religious temples including Bata Managla, Vaishnodevi, Sarala, Dwadash Linga, Siva, Santoshi Maa, Binayak, Maa Laxmi, and the Digambara Jain Temple.

Bhanja Bhaban (comprising the Bhanja Kala Kendra and the Library) and Civic Centre hosts the State level and National Level Drama, Fashion and Dancing competitions throughout the year.

Some tourist destinations in and around Rourkela include:

- Hanuman Vatika, Civil Township
- Mandira Dam
- Vaishnodevi Temple, Rourkela (Replica of Vaishnodevi Temple in Jammu and Kashmir)

Shopping Malls: Forum Galleria Mall in Civil Township, CROSSROAD Mall, Fe2 Arcade (Sector 5) and Plutone in Chhend shopping malls are here.

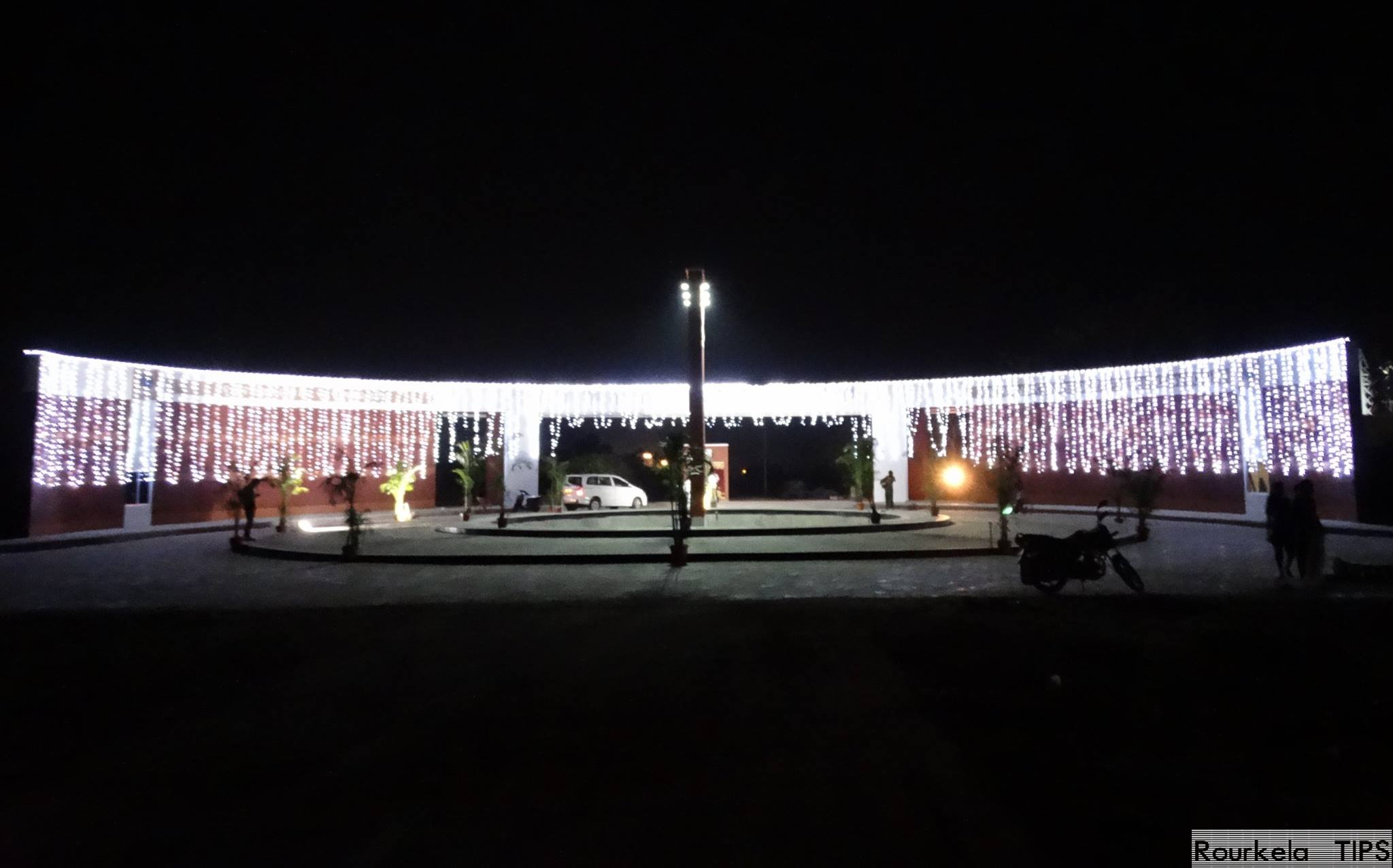
Biju Patnaik University of Technology one of the biggest State-Run Universities in Odisha

== Education ==
Rourkela is one of the educational, technical and medical research hub of Western Odisha and even students from all parts of Odisha and some parts of neighboring states Bihar, Jharkhand and West Bengal come here to pursue higher education. The city houses many Odia & English medium schools which provide BSEO, CBSE and ICSE certificates to their students.

There are ICSE-ISC board schools like St. Paul's School, Mt. Carmel School, St. Joseph's Convent School, Ispat English Medium School, Indo English School, Chinmaya Vidyalaya(E.M.), MGM English Medium School, DeSouza's School, St. Thomas School, St. Mary's School, Loreto English School, Sri Aurobindo's Rourkela School. Most of them are missionary based organizations run by licensee trustees. The students of various schools in Rourkela represent their schools in various national and international level competitions including IMO, IChO, and NASA.

The CBSE board schools include Deepika English Medium School, Delhi Public School, Guru Nanak Public School (GNPS), Dayanand Anglo-Vedic (DAV) School and St. Arnold school. The Central government has its own Kendriya Vidyalaya in Sector-6 and in Bondamunda.

The City also has notable Odia medium schools like Chinmaya Vidyalaya, Saraswati Shishu Vidya Mandir (Sector-6), Ispat Vidyalaya (Sector 18) and Baji Rout High School.

Government Autonomous College, Panposh: State-run co-ed undergraduate and postgraduate college located in Panposh of city Rourkela, Odisha, India. The college was established in the year 1961 as Government Science College but later on it was renamed as Government Autonomous College.

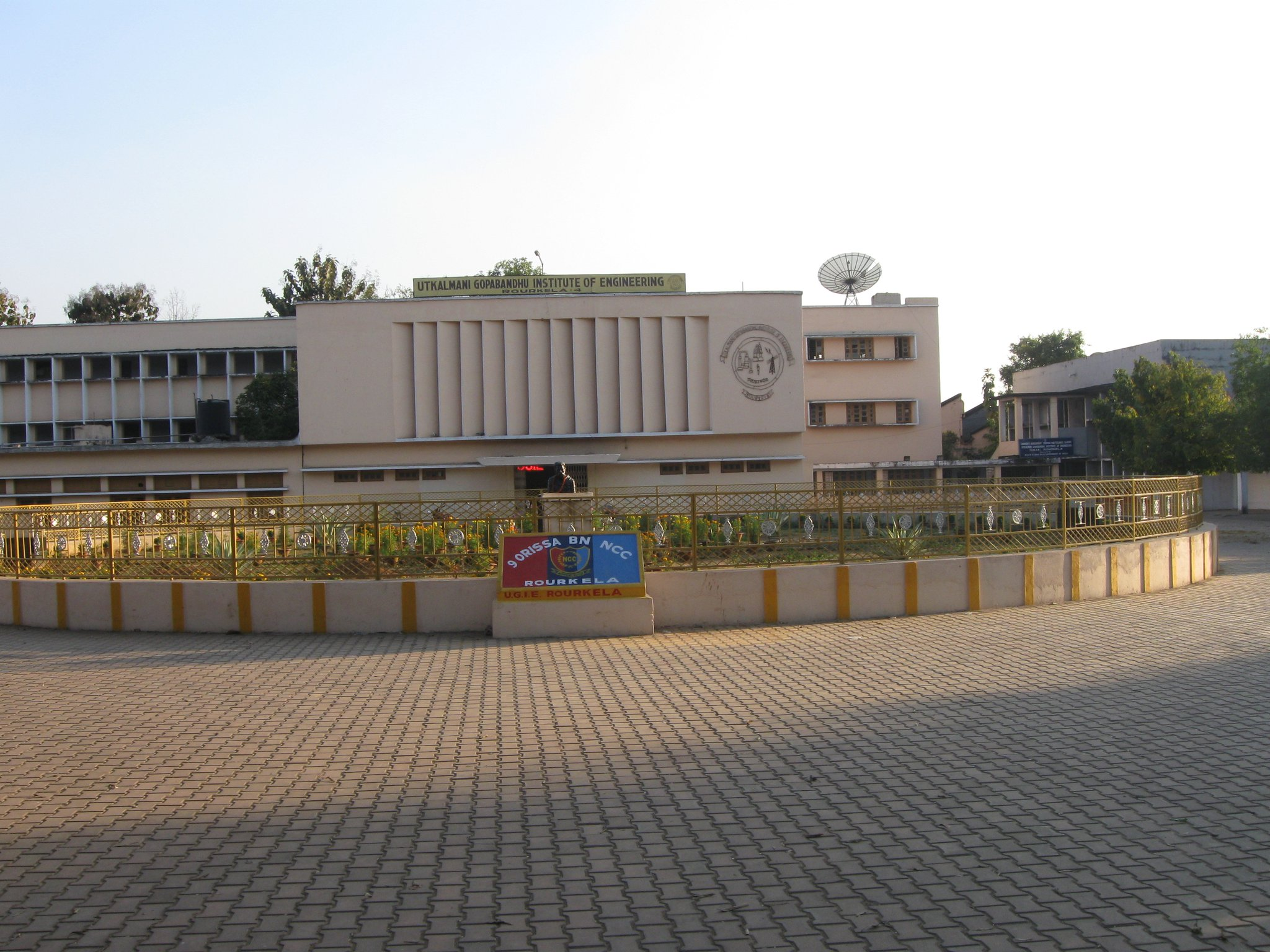
UGIE, Rourkela Main Campus

Utkalmani Gopabandhu Institute of Engineering, Rourkela also called the UGIE is a State Governmental Diploma Engineering Institution in the western Zone of Odisha, which was established in 1962 under the Directorate of Technical Education and Training (DTET), Odisha.

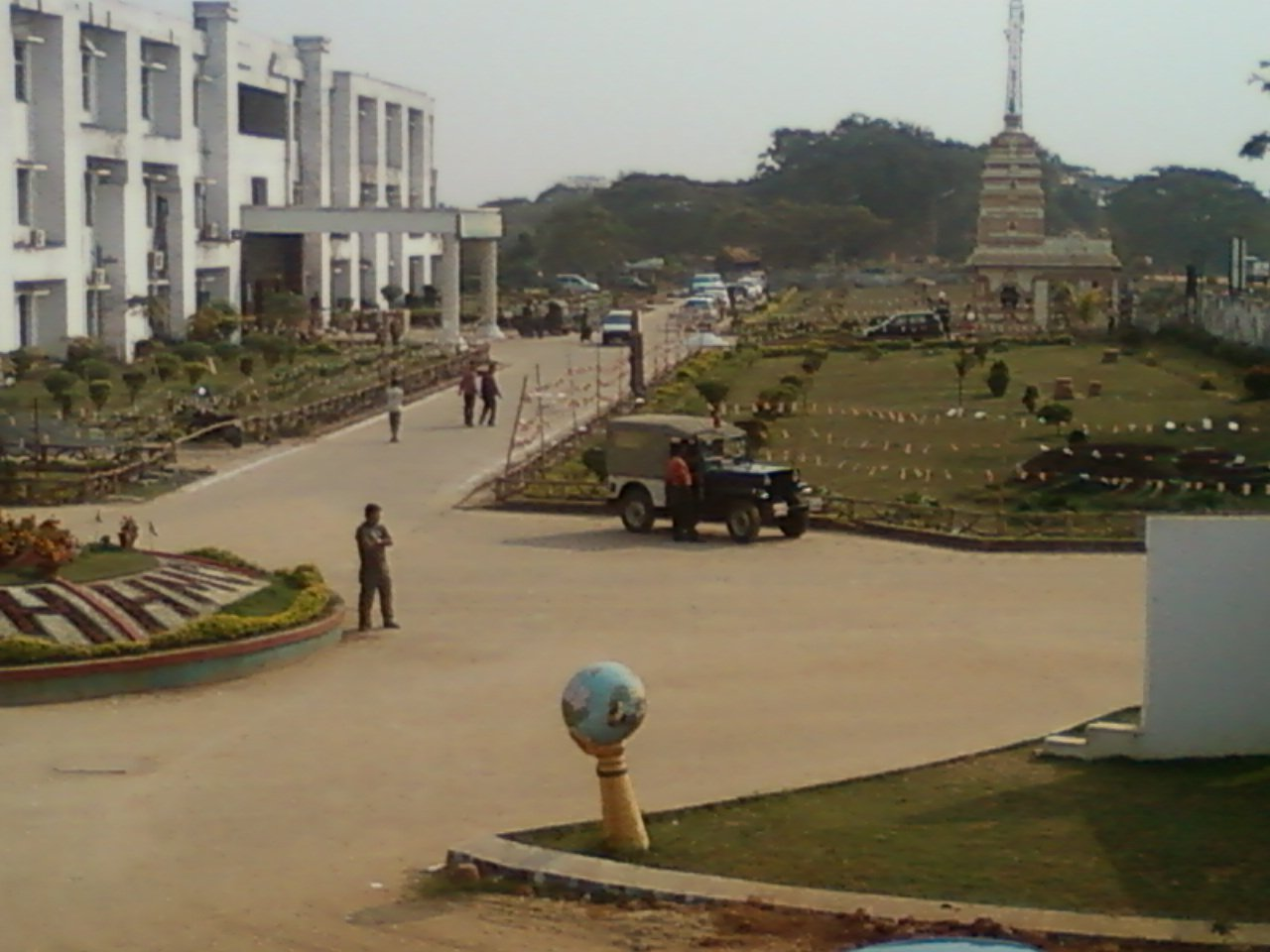
Hi-Tech Medical College and Hospital

Rourkela has Hi-Tech Medical College Hospital Rourkela and is the one of cities in Odisha to have a private medical college outside Bhubaneshwar. There are more than 15 colleges for arts, science, and commerce streams under the Sambalpur University. Some of the famous ones are Government Autonomous College, Rourkela Municipal College, Ispat College, SG Women's College. There are also private Engineering & Management colleges like Rourkela Institute of Management Studies (RIMS), DAMITS, Rourkela Institute of Technology (RIT), Kanak Manjari Institute of Pharmaceutical Sciences (KMIPS), Padmanava College of Engineering (PCE) these colleges come under the jurisdiction of Biju Patnaik University of Technology (BPUT) and the head office is located in Chennd, Rourkela.

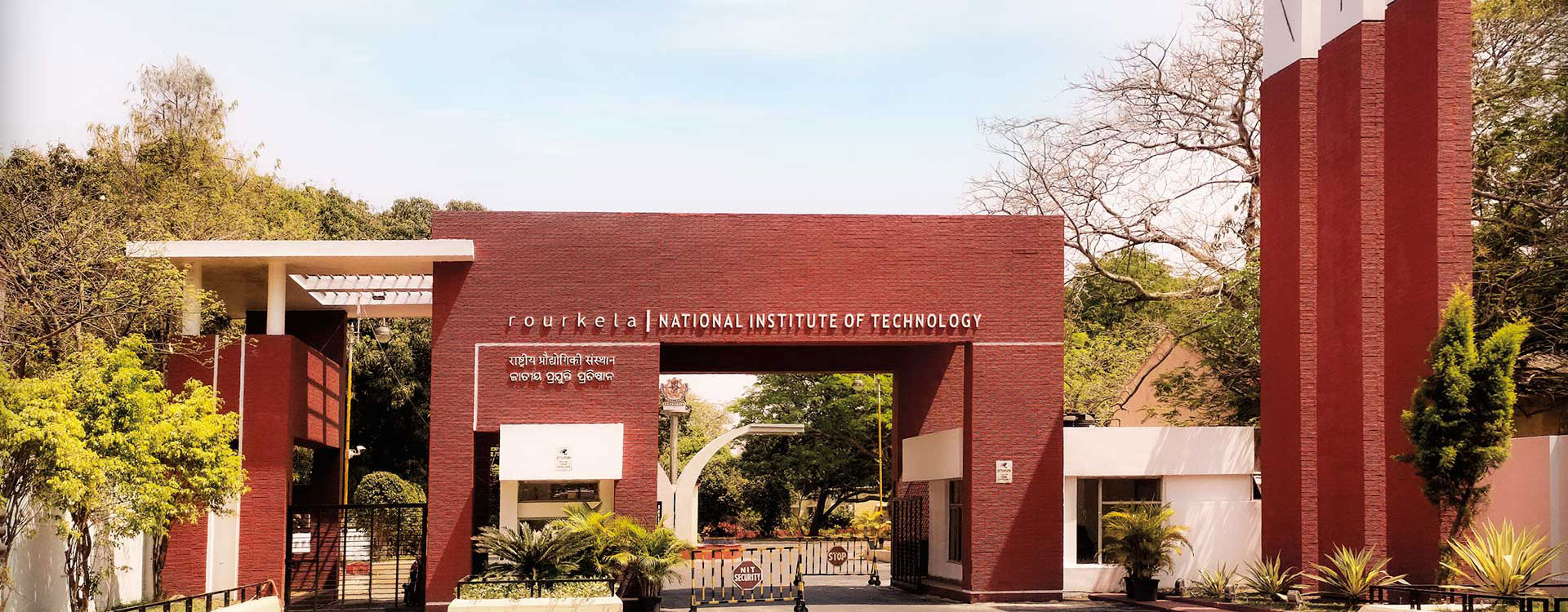
NIT Rourkela Main Gate

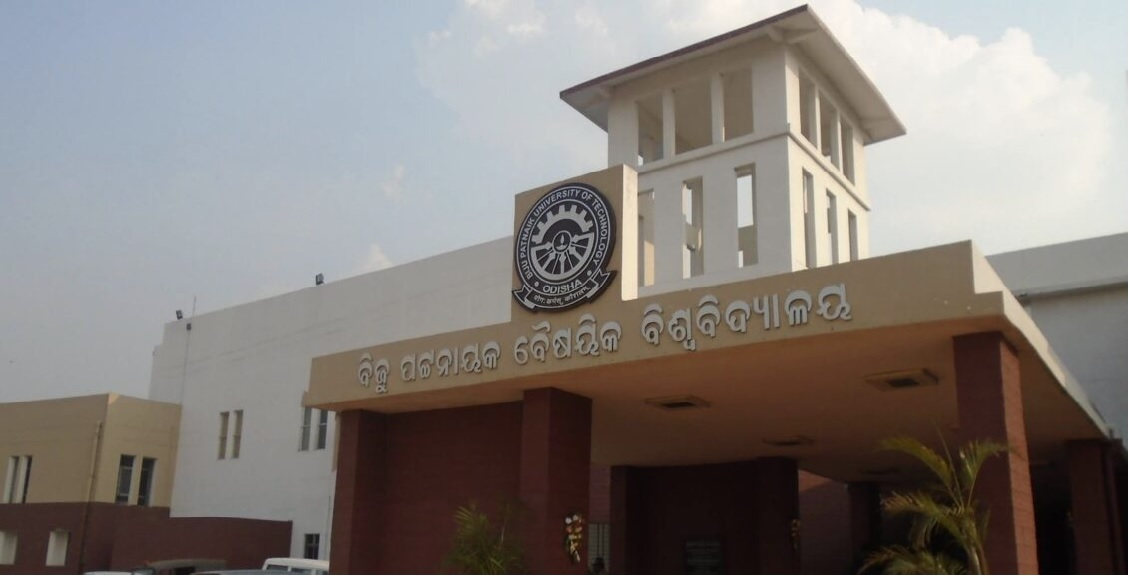
BPUT Main Campus

=== Universities ===
National Institute of Technology Rourkela: NIT Rourkela is one of India's premier technical institutes and is recognised as an Institute of National Importance. Its foundation stone was laid by the first Prime Minister of India, Jawaharlal Nehru in the year of 1961. It was granted autonomy in 2002 and now functions independently under the Ministry of Education. Research at the institute carried out at one of the high-tech collaborative centers, such as the Centre for Robotics and Space Technology Incubation Centre.

Biju Patnaik University of Technology: (BPUT) headquarters in Rourkela came into being in November 2002 through an act of the Odisha state legislature and foundation stone was laid by Dr. A.P.J. Abdul Kalam, the hon’ble President of India. The main objective of university is to ensure a high quality of students coming out of the technical colleges through a common curriculum and uniform evaluation. BPUT also has its own campus college CUPGS in Rourkela, it offers BTech, MTech.

== Sports ==
=== Hockey ===
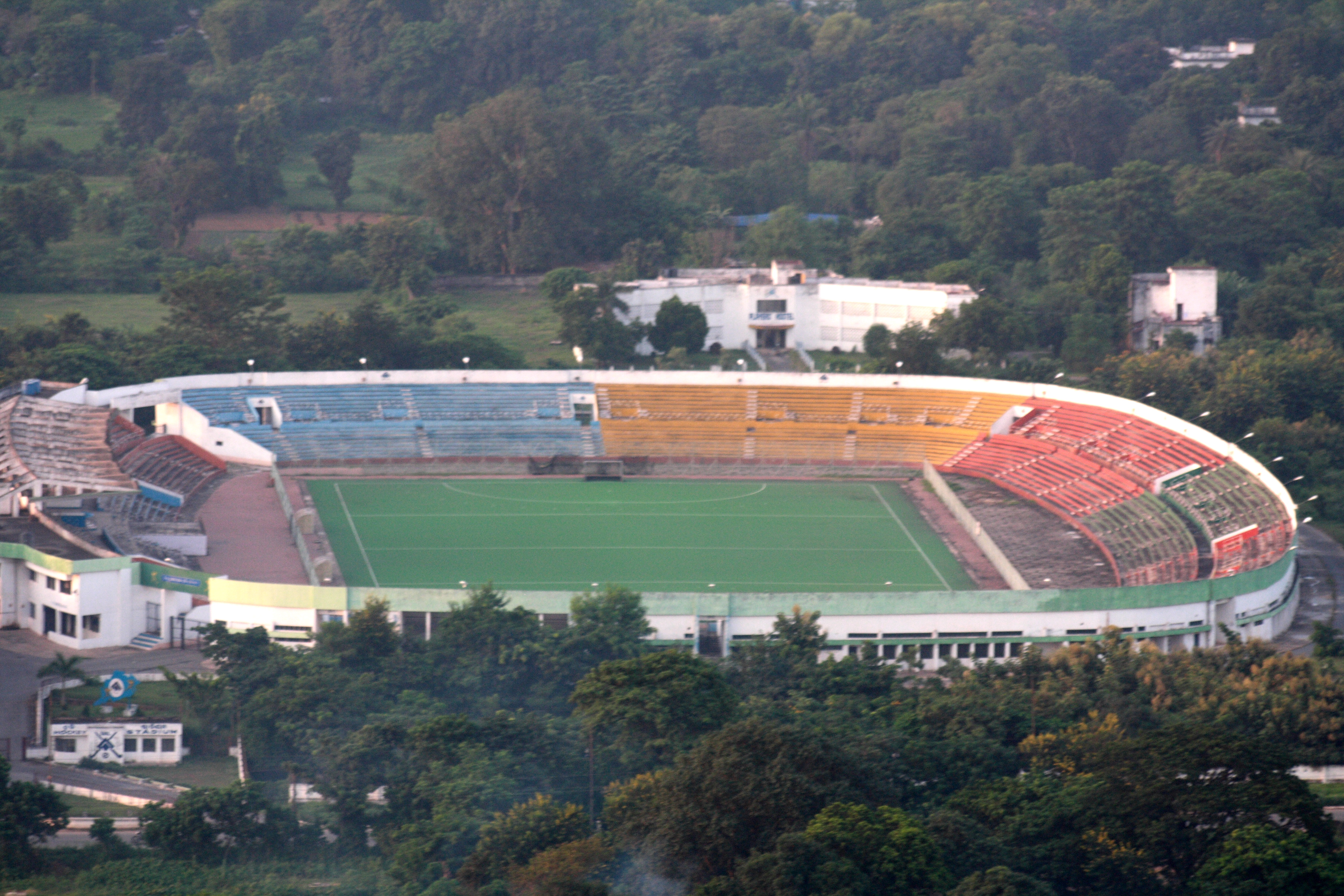
Biju Patnaik Hockey Stadium

The city becomes a sports hub with many stadiums and few sports academy in and around. The two stadiums are Biju Patnaik Hockey Stadium, with synthetic astroturf built by SAIL and Ispat Stadium that consist of a basketball ground, a chess hall, and a well-maintained volleyball ground nearby as well. The indoor stadium at Sector-20 hosts the badminton and Table Tennis events. The number of academies in the city has produced many nationally and internationally acclaimed Hockey players. The Ispat stadium and a number of game specific facilities from Odisha Govt. and SAIL have played a key role in honing the talents of the youngsters.

India's former hockey captains Dilip Tirkey, Ignace Tirkey and Prabodh Tirkey and defender Lazarus Barla started their careers in Rourkela. Rourkela has special hockey hostels for kids, upbringing the next generation players with some of the best amenities. It has produced a few Arjuna Awardees, including Minati Mohapatra. Olympians like Paralympian Roshan and Rachita Mistry are from this city. Former hockey player and 1972 Summer Olympics Bronze medal winner, Michael Kindo, also happens to be a current resident of the city.

=== Other Sports ===
Indian national cricketer Sanjay Raul and the Under-19 world cup representative Chandrakant Barik play from this city. Pabitra Mohan Mohanty, the former national 'B' champion in chess and second only to Viswanathan Anand in national 'A' category is a resident of this city.

=== Stadiums ===
- Birsa Munda International Hockey Stadium
- Biju Patnaik Hockey Stadium (Sector-5)
- Ispat Stadium (Sector-6)
- Birsa Munda Athletic Stadium
- Biju Patnaik Indoor Stadium, Panposh

== Media ==
Rourkela City has a radio station of All India Radio (A.I.R) on FM Band 102.6 MHz since 24 June 1995. AIR Rourkela has one transmission from 06:00 AM to 11:10 PM daily. Other privately owned radio channels include Radio 92.7 BIG FM, Choklate 104 FM, 98.3 Tarang FM and 91.9 Sarthak FM. These channels broadcast Hindi and Odia film and non-film songs, talk shows and other entertainment programmes. Private Digital media channels include Rourkela Shines, Satya News Alert also operates from Rourkela to provide local news.

== Festivals ==
Being a cosmopolitan city, Rourkela celebrates festivals such as Utkala Dibasa, Rama Navami, Pana Sankranti (Odia new year), Devasnana Purnima, Raja, Rath Yatra, Raji Karma Puja, Nuakhai, Sarna Puja, Durga Puja, Kali Puja, Chhat Puja, Kartika Purnima, Ganesh Puja, Laxmi Puja, Vishwakarma Puja, Deepawali, Dola Yatra, Holi, Good Friday, Christmas etc.

The City Fest named as 1st Brahmani River Festival in its first edition was from 1 to 3 February 2019. It showcased the rich tribal heritage that is present in and around Rourkela and Sundargarh District.

== Notable residents ==
- Lazarus Barla — Indian hockey player
- Natraj Behera — former Odisha cricket team captain
- Samir Dash — entrepreneur
- Debasish Ghose — academic, professor at the Indian Institute of Science
- C. P. Gurnani — CEO & managing director of Tech Mahindra
- Harish Hande — Magsaysay Award winner
- Michael Kindo — Indian hockey player and Olympic medalist
- Ramendra Kumar — award-winning children's fiction writer
- Birendra Lakra — hockey player
- Rachita Mistry — Olympic athlete
- Bibhu Mohapatra — fashion designer
- Mira Nair — film director and author
- Jual Oram — current MP from Sundargarh and Union Minister for Tribal Affairs
- Govinda Poddar — current Odisha cricket team captain
- Dilip Ray — MLA (Rourkela), founder of Mayfair group of hotels
- Biswapati Sarkar — writer and director
- Dilip Tirkey — former captain, Indian National Hockey Team
- Ignace Tirkey — former captain, Indian National Hockey Team
- Prabodh Tirkey — former captain, Indian National Hockey Team
- Binita Toppo — hockey player
- White Town — singer and musician
- Amish Tripathi — author
