= Kalunga Industrial Estate =

- District Industrial Estate
- Location in Odisha, India
- Coordinates: 22.2226081°N 84.7596931°E
- Country: India
- State: Odisha
- District: Sundargarh

Area
  - Total: 18 km^{2} (6.9 sq mi)
- Elevation: 145 m (476 ft)

Population (2001)
  - Total: 5,296
  - Density: 50/km^{2} (130/sq mi)

Languages
  - Official: Odia
- Time zone: UTC+5:30 (IST)
- PIN: 770031
- Vehicle registration: OR 14

Kalunga is an Industrial Estate, which is situated at outskirts from the steel city Rourkela in Sundargarh district in Odisha state. It can be reached by both Road & Rail. Situated in the State Highway (SH-10), Rourkela to Sambalpur road.

== Overview ==
Kalunga Industrial is mostly known for the sponge Iron & Chemical factories. It is main hub for the production of steel & chemicals for the export in Odisha.

The city industrial hub of Kalunga, have residence of mainly industrial laborers who work in the factories. Kalunga is also known for the College of Rourkela Institute of Technology, which is situated in the center of its area.

== Demographics ==
As of 2001 India census, Kalunga had a population of 5296. Males constitute 53% of the population and females 47%. Kalunga has an average literacy rate of 30%, lower than the national average of 59.5%: male literacy is 48%, and female literacy is 21%. In Kalunga, 12% of the population is under 6 years of age.

== Transport ==
Kalunga is a station on the Tatanagar Rourkela Bilaspur section of Howrah Nagpur Mumbai main line. Through road it lies on the Sambalpur Rourkela Biju Express Way. This city is well connected to Rourkela, Sundargarh, Sambalpur and Ranchi through the local buses.

== Education ==
Kalunga has a government High School located in the main center of the hub. Still the industrial estate has got St. Gregorious Higher Secondary School, one of the best English medium school in the district which is affiliated to ICSE up to standard XII.

Another Important Diploma College include Rourkela Institute of Technology, which was established in the year of 1984, in the private industrial estate of Kalunga.

== Factories ==
Factories Include:

- SAV Industries Pvt. Ltd
- Nixon Steel & Power
- IFGL Refractories Limited
- Hindustan Aqua
- Poly Refractories Pvt. Ltd
- Utkal Metallic Ltd.
- Pooja Sponge Pvt. Ltd.
- Kalinga Sponge Iron Ltd.
- Kedia Carbon Pvt. Ltd.
- Santa Chemicals Pvt. Ltd.
- Shivani Metal's & Minerals
- Shiela Engineering Works
- Irshant Innovations Pvt. Ltd.
- Cera Engineering Pvt. Ltd.
- Mahalaxmi Furnace
- Spardha Steel Pvt. Ltd.
- Rifulgent Ispat Pvt. Ltd.
- Process Additives & Chemical's Pvt. Ltd.
- Bajrangbali RE Rollers Pvt. Ltd.
- Golchha Pigments Pvt. Ltd.
- Chariot Cement Company
- Maa Visnovi Sponge Ltd
- Meta Sponge (P) Ltd.
- Sponge Udyog Pvt. Ltd.
- Seeta Sponge Iron Ltd.,
- Maa Tarini Industries (P) Ltd.
- Sponge Udyog Pvt. Ltd.
- Sri Mahavir Ferro Alloys (P) Ltd.
- AKS Electrical's Pvt Ltd .
- Gajalakshmi Iron Works.
- Applied Communication & Controls
- Raj Engineers
- SLM TECHNOLOGY(P) LTD.

== Tourism ==
Kalunga is known for its beautiful rain water Harvesting Dam of Pitamahal Dam which is located 10 km inside the Industrial estate.
