= Samir Dash =

Indian businessman

- Born: 5 July 1982 (age 42); Rourkela, Odisha, India
- Occupation(s): techie, entrepreneur
- Years active: 2007–present
- Spouse: Sangeeta Dash

Samir Dash is a techie and an entrepreneur from Rourkela, Orissa.

In 2007, Samir hosted "MobileWish" — a unique software application that can be used to send and receive animated and customised e-greetings on GPRS-enabled mobile phones with Internet connection.

In 2009 he developed and launched "Pocket Travel Assistant" (PTA) — a mobile application that can be downloaded to symbian mobile phones — provided every possible information needed by a traveller.

Samir has been awarded globally for his initiatives in mobile content and applications, namely "The Manthan Award South Asia 2009", "World Summit Award Mobile 2010".

Samir authored a number of books on critical theory & UX, namely "Beginners Guide To Modern Critical Theory" and "Quick and Dirty Guide for Developers: Adobe Edge Preview 3 in 4 Hours"
