= Hanuman Vatika =

Garden in Rourkela, India

Coordinates: 22.221739°N 84.831564°E

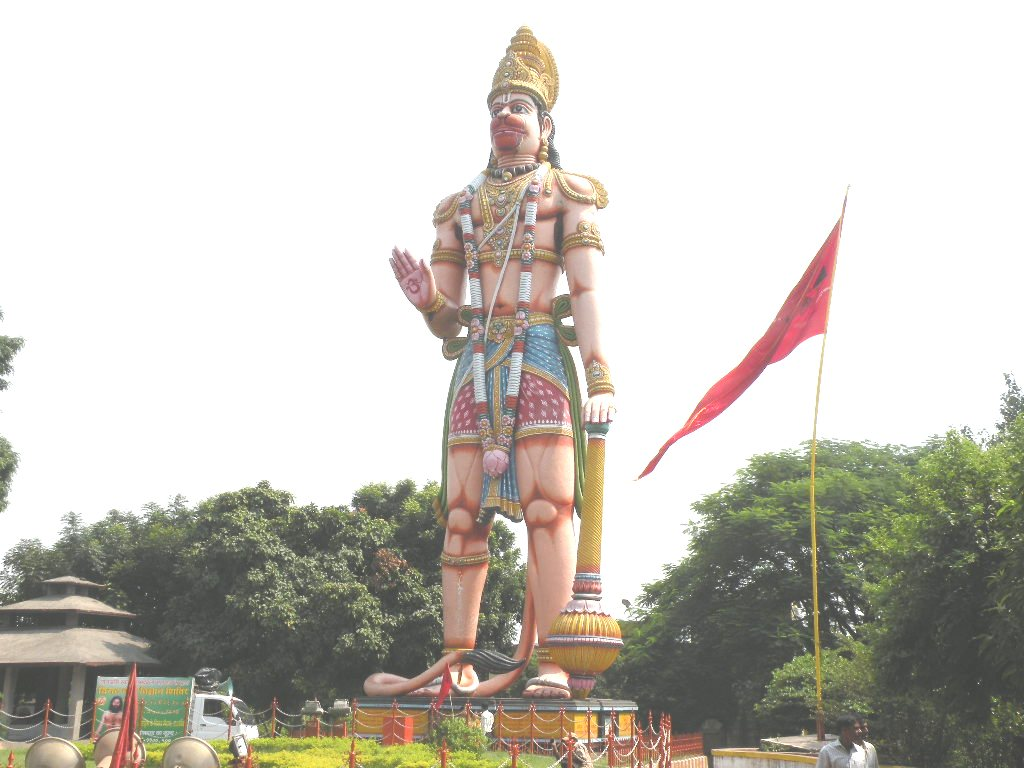
Hanuman Statue in Hanuman Vatika

Hanuman Vatika, or the garden belonging to Lord Hanuman, is situated in Civil Township, Rourkela. The garden houses one of the world's tallest statue of Hanuman. Apol

== Location ==
It is situated adjacent to Rourkela General Hospital, beside the Rourkela ring road in Civil township, Rourkela-4 approximately at a distance of 6 km from Rourkela railway station, towards south west direction.

== Attractions ==
The garden was renovated and inaugurated by the then Chief Minister, late Biju Patnaik of Odisha. The height of the statue is 23 metres (75 ft). Every year on 23 February it celebrates its foundation day. Other temples inside the premises are 12 Jyotirlingas, Batta Mangala Devi, Sarala Devi Temple, Jagannath Temple, Lakshmi, and Santoshi Mata Temple. One Kalyan Mandap is built to accommodate public gatherings and functions. The Hanuman statue was built by Sri Lakshman Swami of Hyderabad. The newly established Sai Baba temple has become the favorite of the devotees, the idol of which is very similar to the idol of the one situated in Shirdi Sai Baba.

== History ==
Hanuman Vatika named after one of the highest statue of Hanuman. Inaugurated in the year 1994 by the then Chief Minister of Orissa, Biju Patnaik. Here a statue of Hanuman is constructed with the height of 23 metres (75 ft). There are also a number of temples named as Bata Managla, Binayak, Vaishnodevi, Sarala, Dwadash Linga, Siva, Santoshi Maa, Maa Laxmi etc. constructed here for the devotees. Because of beauty scenario and green area, number of general visitors came to this place every day here.

Hanuman Vatika Trust Board manages this place within a sprawling campus of area surrounding of 5.2 hectares (13 acres). A kalyan mandap is also here for various social functions like Marriage, Bratostaba & Ekoishia etc.
