= Government Autonomous College, Rourkela =

Autonomous college in Rourkela, India

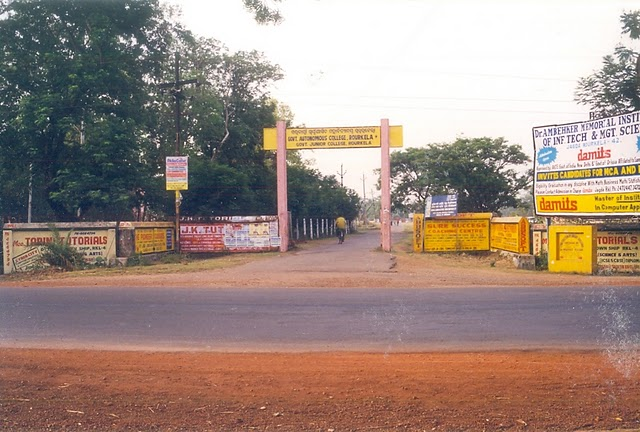
- Motto: योगः कर्मसु कौशलम् ଯୋଗଃ କର୍ମସୁ କୌଶଳମ୍ Yoga Karmasu Kaushālam
- Type: Public
- Established: 1961
- Affiliations: Sambalpur University
- Principal: Smt.Sasmita Samal
- Location: Rourkela, Odisha, India; 22.225568°N 84.807909°E
- Campus: Panposh
- Website: www.gacrkl.ac.in

Government Autonomous College is a state-run co-ed undergraduate and postgraduate college located in the town of Panposh in Rourkela city, Odisha, India. The college was established in 1961 as Government Science College but was later renamed as Government Autonomous College. The institution upholds the development of majority of student's mostly coming from economically weaker sections and Scheduled Tribe. The college is accredited by NAAC with grade 'B' certification. The college has also center for Indira Gandhi National Open University for distance learners.

== History ==
The college was established as Rourkela Science College in Sector 4 in August 1961. After being taken over by the Government of Odisha in July 1963, it was shifted to its present campus at Panposh. Over the next few decades, parts of the campus were allocated for other public projects, including developments associated with Rourkela Smart City. In 2023, the college was undertaking plans for additional academic and infrastructure facilities on its campus.

In 2018, the college planned to introduce additional postgraduate and M.Phil. programmes. The proposed M.Phil. programmes included English, Odia and Botany. Postgraduate programmes in History, Hindi, Mathematics and Statistics were also planned. At the time, postgraduate programmes were already being offered in other subjects including English, Odia, Political Science, Economics, Sociology and Psychology. Postgraduate courses in Commerce and the sciences were already available.

== Courses offered ==
From the 2023–24 academic session, several undergraduate, postgraduate and self-financing courses offered by the college after it received permanent affiliation from Sambalpur University. These included programmes in the arts, sciences and commerce. It also included self-financing courses such as Computer Science, Electronics and Telecommunication, Biotechnology, Journalism and Mass Communication, Tourism and Hospitality Management, and Bachelor of Computer Applications. Permanent affiliation was also granted to postgraduate programmes in the arts and sciences, along with M.Com, M.Sc in Computer Science and M.A. in Journalism and Mass Communication.

=== Under-graduate courses ===
==== Bachelor of Science ====
• Botany • Botany with Tissue culture and vertical gardening (AEDP) • Zoology • Zoology and integrative bioscience (AEDP) • Chemistry • Chemistry and Industrial Chemistry (AEDP) • Geology • Geology with Exploration Geoscience & Mapping (AEDP) • Mathematics • Mathematics & Computing (AEDP) • Physics • Statistics

==== Bachelor of Commerce ====
• Commerce • HR Operations and Commerce (AEDP)

==== Bachelor of Arts ====
• Geography • English • Hindi • Odia • Sanskrit • History • Home Science • Political Science • Philosophy • Psychology • Sociology • Anthropology • Economics • Education • Public Administration • Journalism and Mass Communication • Industrial Sociology • Library and Information Science • Tourism and Hospitality Management • Food Science and Hospitality Operation & Home Science (AEDP) • Economics and data analytics (AEDP) • English and Translation & digital humanities (AEDP) • History with Tourism and Hospitality Operations (AEDP) • Library and Information Science with (AEDP)

=== Self Financing Courses ===
• Biotechnology • Mathematics with Computer Science • Computer Science • Electronics & Telecommunications • BCA

=== Post-Graduate Courses ===
- Masters in Commerce (64 Seats)
- Masters in English (32 Seats)
- Masters in Oriya (32 Seats)
- Masters in Economics (32 Seats)
- Masters in Education (32 Seats)
- Masters in History (32 Seats)
- Masters in Philosophy (32 Seats)
- Masters in Political science (32 Seats)
- Masters in Psychology (32 Seats)
- Masters in Sociology (32 Seats)
- Masters in Botany (32 Seats)
- Masters in Chemistry (32 Seats)
- Masters in ETC (Electronics and Tele-Communication) (32 Seats)
- Masters in MTC (Mathematics with Computer) (32 Seats)
- Masters in Mathematics (32 Seats)
- Masters in Statistics (32 Seats)
- Masters in Zoology (32 Seats)
- Masters in Physics (32 Seats)

== Incidents ==
In July 2025, two students were found in an intoxicated state at a teacher's residence on the college campus and were subsequently rescued.
