= Mandira Dam =

Dam in Odisha, India

Coordinates: 22.268979°N 84.656235°E

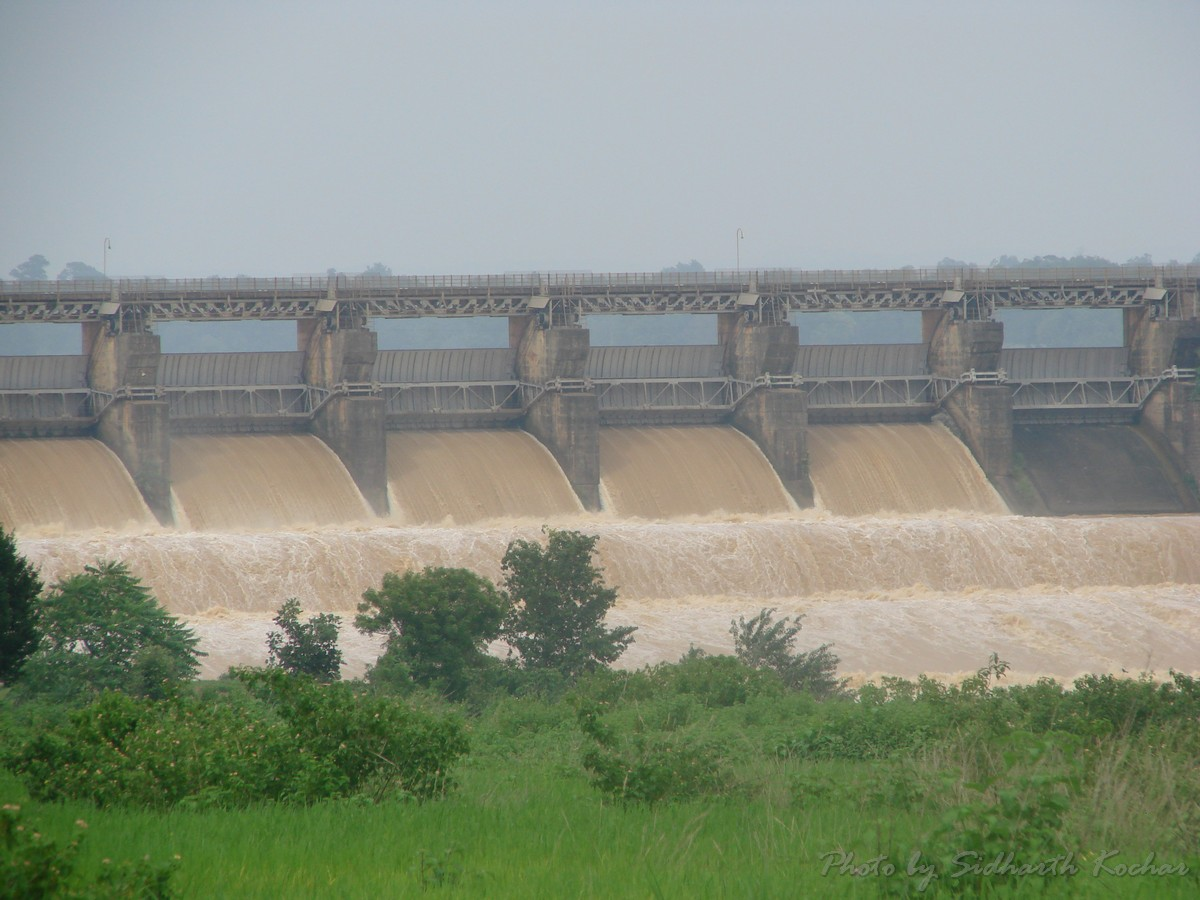
Mandira Dam

Mandira Dam is located near Kansbahal in Sundergarh district, Odisha, India. It is built across Sankh river, near Kansbahal, located 16 km upstream from Mandira. The water from the dam is used for running the Rourkela Steel Plant. Construction of the dam began after 1957. The dam displaced 2400 families and only 843 were resettled.

== Tourism ==
The reservoir offers boating facilities for tourists and the nearest railway station is located in Kansbahal on the Howrah-Mumbai main line of South Eastern Railway. Rourkela is the closest junction station. The dam can be reached from Kansbahal and Rourkela by two-wheeler, private cars, taxis, auto rickshaws and irregular bus service.
