= Ispat Stadium =

Cricket stadium in Rourkela, Odisha, India

Coordinates: 22°14′48″N 84°51′44″E

- Interactive map of Ispat Stadium
- Full name: Ispat Stadium
- Location: Rourkela, Odisha, India
- Owner: Rourkela Steel Plant
- Capacity: 30,000

Construction
- Groundbreaking: 1969
- Opened: 1969

Ispat Stadium is a cricket stadium located in Rourkela, Odisha, India. The ground is mainly used for organizing matches of football, cricket and other sports. The stadium has hosted three Ranji Trophy matches in 1972 when Odisha cricket team played against Bihar cricket team. The stadium also hosted three List A matches from 1990 to 1993 as well as a Youth One Day International in 1990 when India Under-19 cricket team played Pakistan Under-19 cricket team. Up to January 2016 it was again ready to host national and list A matches and it is well maintained stadium.

== History ==
Ispat Stadium was built by SAIL in 1969, which has lush green grass field and played all major sports activities. The stadium is well maintained by SAIL-RSP. Different national and district level sports are conducting here like cricket, football, basketball and athletic workout.
