= Biju Patnaik Hockey Stadium =

Hockey stadium in Rourkela, Odisha, India

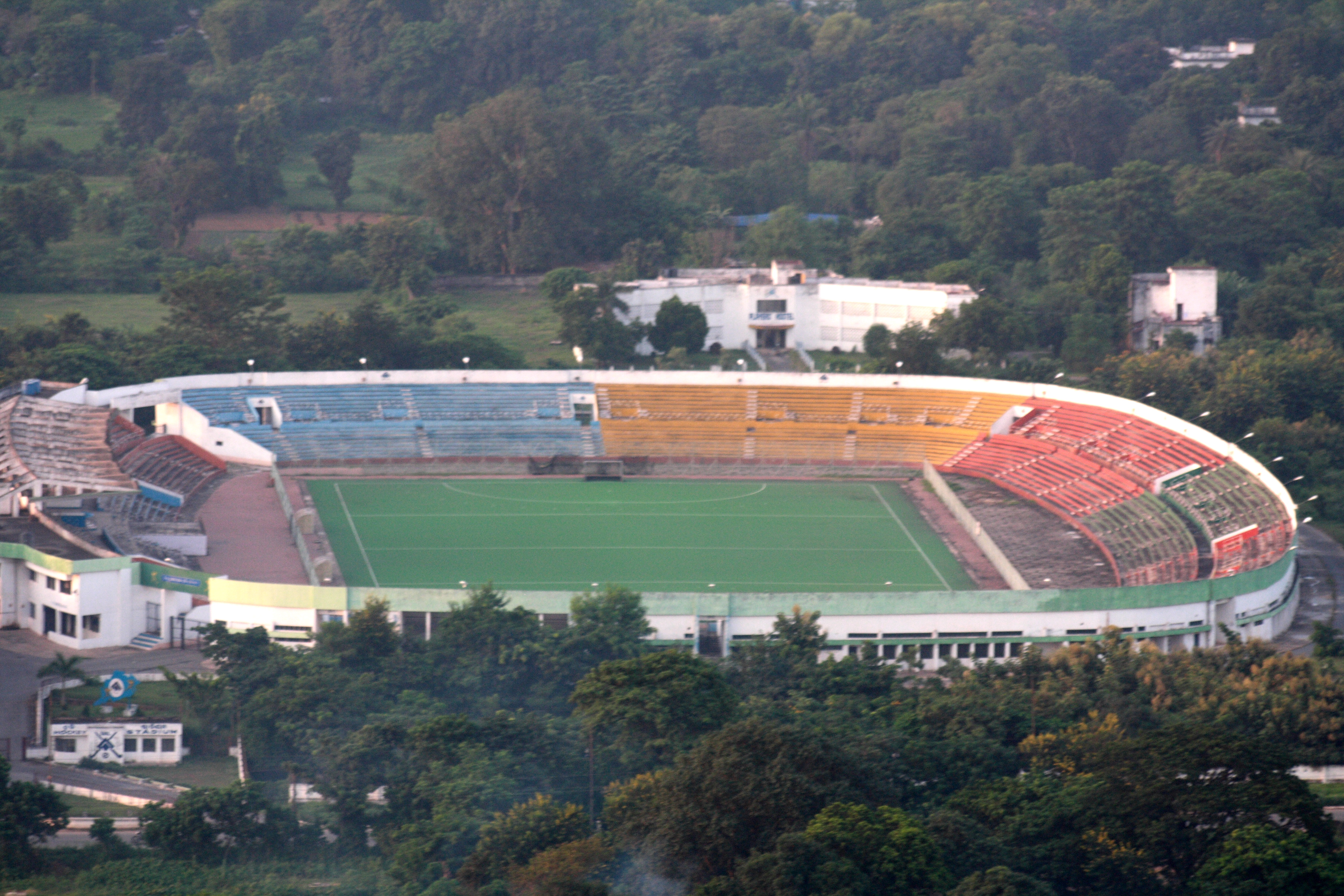
- Bird's eye view of the stadium
- Interactive map of Biju Patnaik Hockey Stadium
- Location: Sector-6, Rourkela, Odisha
- Coordinates: 22.245878°N 84.864286°E
- Owner: Government of Odisha
- Operator: SAIL
- Capacity: 25,000
- Surface: AstroTurf
- Public transit: Rourkela Railway Station, Rourkela Airport

Construction
- Built: 1998

Tenants
- India men's national field hockey team Odisha Hockey Team; Kalinga Lancers

Biju Patnaik Hockey Stadium is a hockey stadium in Rourkela, Odisha. The stadium was constructed and maintained by SAIL. It was possible due to initiatives taken by Late Bipin Behari Panda and M. Kindo in early 90s.

The stadium is mainly used for field hockey and has synthetic AstroTurf which has been host to World Hockey Junior World Cup and been a training centre to most of the international hockey players of India.

The stadium is the home ground of Odisha Hockey Team. Situated on the middle of Sector-5 and Sector-6 areas on the side of the main road leading to Sector-6. The said stadium was constructed and maintained by SAIL, Rourkela Steel Plant authority having AstroTurf with nylon grass for national and international level hockey match and practice. Office of the DGM (sports) of Rourkela Steel Plant, the highest body of SAIL, RSP for nurturing the sports talent of the area is located here.

SAIL Hockey Academy: This academy has been playing a role in identifying talents and shaping their skills for the National Team in International Competitions. The Academy has helped many cadets who represented the country.

== Hockey Championship Event ==
Number of Annual and regular hockey matches took place at this place throughout the year. The campus is a specialized facility used to train young hockey players from the Sundergarh District. It is located in this area to support the development of local athletes.

Honorable Vice President of India Mohammad Hamid Ansari inaugurated Biju Patnaik Rural Hockey Championship at Biju Patnaik Hockey Stadium in the year of 10 December 2016 . In which over 1500 teams from Odisha, Chhattisgarh, Jharkhand took part in this championship event.

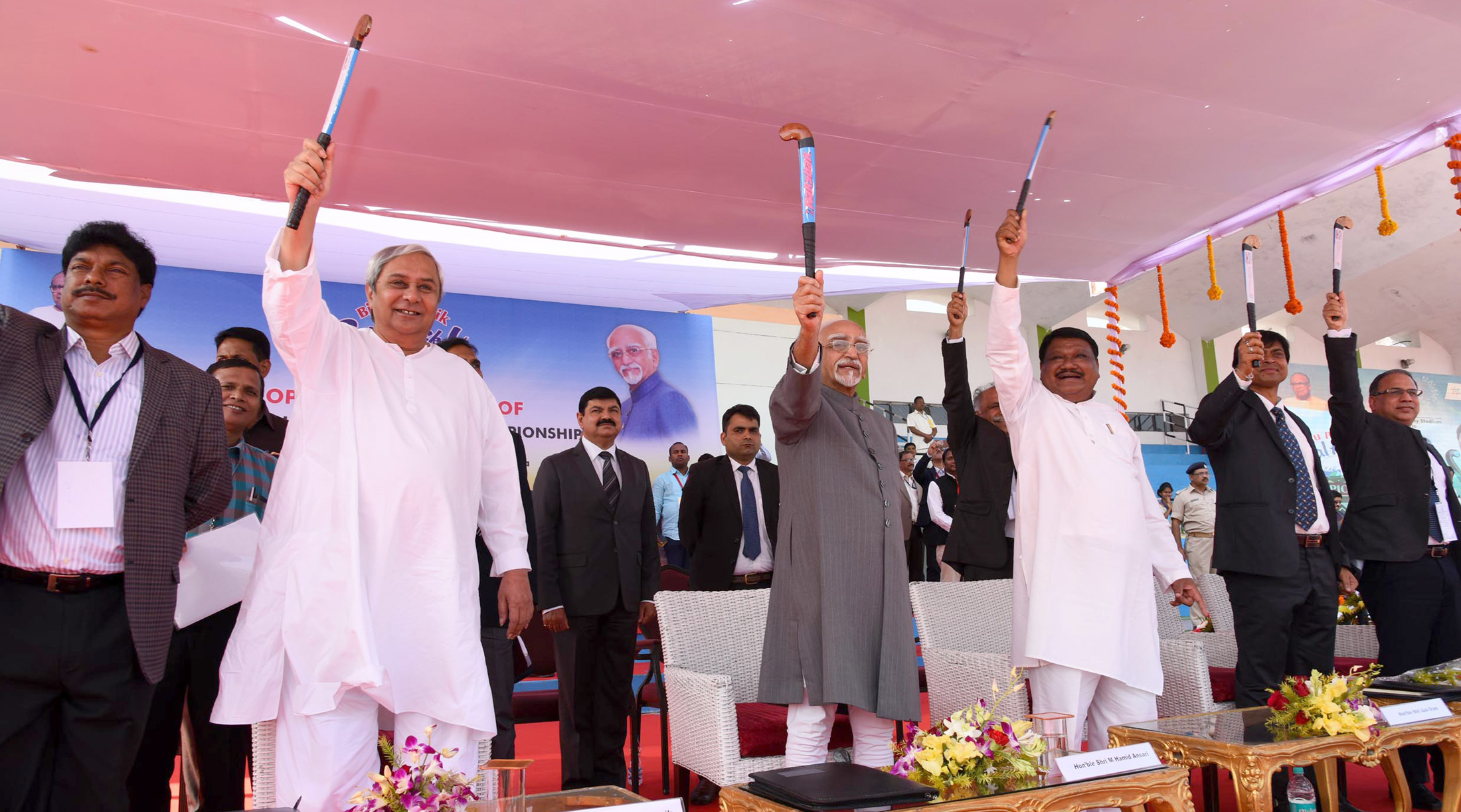
Shri M. Hamid Ansari, Vice President of India, inauguration of Biju Patnaik Rural Hockey Championship

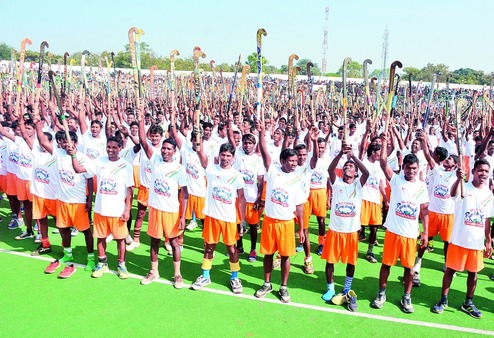
Rural Hockey Championship Event

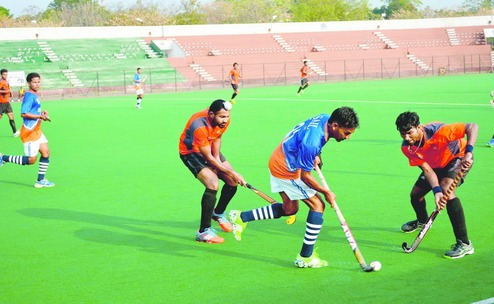
All-India Public-Sector Sports Promotion Board Hockey Championship, 2016
