= Ispat English Medium School =

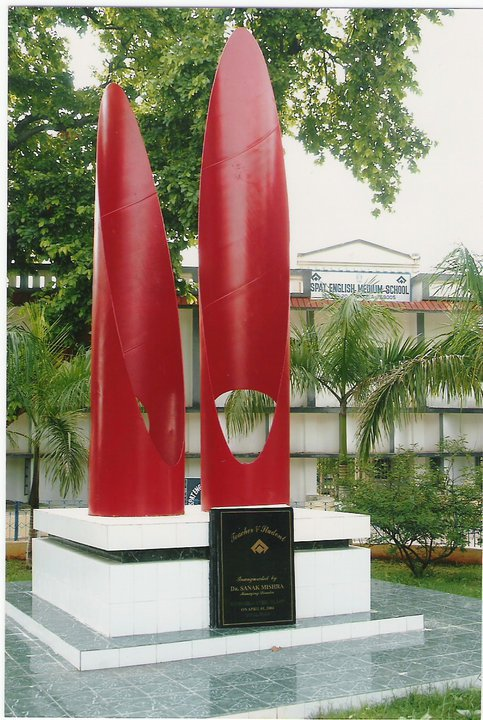

Location
- Sector - 20; Rourkela, Odisha; India; 22.2625°N 84.8802°E

Information
- Type: Primary, Middle, Secondary
- Motto: Play The Game
- Established: 1961
- Principal: B. Kar
- Faculty: 60
- Enrollment: 1500
- Classes: I to XII
- Houses: Red, Yellow, Blue, Green
- Mascot: Tagore, Rajaji, Shivaji, Pratap
- Yearbook: Spectrum
- Website: iemsrsp.com

Ispat English Medium School is an English medium school in Sector 20 of the Rourkela Steel Township in Rourkela, Odisha, India. The school follows the syllabus prescribed by the CISCE.

== History ==
Ispat English Medium School, the only Indian Certificate of Secondary Education institution under the Steel Authority of India (SAIL), was founded in 1961 with 27 students, five teachers and two classrooms. It ran on the Indian Public School (IPS) system. The school has been affiliated with the Council for the Indian School Certificate Examinations, New Delhi since May 1964. It is one of the first schools established in Rourkela and the first to have English as the medium of instruction. Admission is open only to children of parents working for SAIL, CISF, CRPF and other Central Government undertakings and REC.

== About ==
In 1982 the institution started a Junior College (ISC +2) with a Science Stream. Its academic activities expanded with the addition of a +2 Commerce stream from 2004.

In 2011, the school celebrated the 50th anniversary of its founding.

=== Facilities ===
The school is a co-educational day-school and is run by the education department of SAIL. The school currently has 1500 students and sixty teachers.

=== Housing ===
The school is set up according to a house system. The four houses are:

Color	House	Named After
Green	Pratap	Maharana Pratap
Yellow	Rajaji	C. Rajagopalachari
Blue	Shivaji	Chhatrapati Shivaji Maharaj
Red	Tagore	Rabindranath Tagore
