= Deepika Mahila Sanghati =

- President: Mrs. Namrata Verma
- Secretary: Mrs. Sarika Kumar
- Headquarters: Sector 02, Rourkela, Odisha

Deepika Mahila Sanghati (DMS) is a women-run NGO (non-governmental organization) in the city of Rourkela, in sector 2. It has contributed to welfare of women and their empowerment. This NGO plays a major role in corporate social responsibility (CSR) programs associated with SAIL (Rourkela Steel Plant).

== Activities ==
Deepika Mahila Sanghati was one of the main pioneer organizations for the opening of Deepika English Medium School in 1976. Now two schools — Deepika Ispat Siksha Sadan and Beginners Academy — are run by DMS.

The Masala and Medical units continue to touch all in Rourkela and nearby villages. With the patronage of RSP CSR departments, units like Hastakargha, sanitary napkin and Phenyl are operating from Deepika Mahila Jagriti Sansthan, Sec-2 Rourkela. A snacks selling outlet 'Swalpahar' has been opened in the IGH campus to take care of the needs of patients and attendants. All these units employ or train needy local women with an aim to make them independent and self sufficient.

== Working Body ==
Presently Mrs. Namrata Verma is the president of Deepika Mahila Sanghati, with Mrs. Pravati Misra, Mrs. Reeta Behuria, Mrs. Pratijna Palai, Mrs. Bandana Singh, Mrs. Ritarani and Mrs. Nabanita Palchowdhury as Vice Presidents, Mrs. Sarika Kumar as secretary, Mrs. Poonam Rao as Joint Secretary, Mrs. Asima Mishra as Treasurer, Mrs. Bibha Sinha as Joint Treasurer and Mrs. Lavanya Prava as the Cultural Secretary overlooking the cultural affairs of the organisation.

== See also ==
- Deepika English Medium School
- Rourkela Steel Plant
- Home and Hope, Rourkela
