= Bondamunda block (Rural) =

Bondamunda
- Community development block

- Location within Odisha Location within India Location within Asia
- Coordinates: 22.237634°N 84.953337°E
- Country: India
- State: Odisha
- District: Sundargarh

Area
  - Rural: 27.73 km^{2} (10.71 sq mi)
- Elevation: 217 m (712 ft)

Population (2011)
  - Rural: 14,399
  - Rural density: 519.3/km^{2} (1,345/sq mi)
- Time zone: UTC+5:30 (IST)
- Vehicle registration: OD-14

Bondamunda is a community development block in Sundargarh district, Odisha, India. It is 13 kilometres (8.1 mi) from Rourkela Steel Plant. It has a population of 14,399 with 7,298 being males and 7,101 being females.

== Geography ==
It borders Raurkela (M), and Raurkela (ITS) at west, and North to East to South of Bisra.

Climate data for {{{location}}}
Month	Jan	Feb	Mar	Apr	May	Jun	Jul	Aug	Sep	Oct	Nov	Dec	Year

== Demographics ==
Historical population
Year	Pop.	±%
2001	29,182	—
2011	14,399	−50.7%
Source: Census of India

As of 2011 census, Bondamunda has population of 14,399 and male population of 7,298 and female population of 7,101. The sex ratio in Bondamunda is 974 females per 1000 males, indicating an above-average compared to the national average of 943. Child population (0–6) is 1,671, which is 11.6% of Bondamunda block's population. Child sex ratio of Bondamunda is 919 females for every 1000 males.

Castes in Bondamunda:
1. Scheduled castes 1,489 (10.3%)
2. Scheduled tribes 9,574 (66.5%)
3. Not indigenous 3,336 (23.2%)
Source: Census of India

Religions in Bondamunda block
Religion	Percentage
Hinduism	59.56%
Christianity	20.3%
Others	19.76%
Not stated	0.38%

Bondamunda have scheduled castes population of 1,489, scheduled tribes 9,574 and non indigeous 3,336.

Literacy rate is 71.19% with male literacy rate at 80.47% and female literacy is 61.72%.

== Economy ==
Rourkela Steel Plant, located 13 kilometres from the block center

Livelihood
in Bondamunda block
1. Cultivators 901 (16.6%)
2. Agricultural Labourers 534 (9.85%)
3. House Industries 479 (8.83%)
4. Other workers 3,508 (64.7%)

Population dropped from 29,182 in 2001 to 14,399 in 2011, indicating -50.7% growth in population (pagr: -6.8%). This possibly indicated half of the population either fled to Rourkela for work (other reasons: population deaths due to events).
