= Bondamunda =

Bondamunda Bandhamunda
- Village
- Location in Odisha, India
- Coordinates: 22.237315°N 84.909892°E
- Country: India
- State: Odisha
- District: Sundargarh

Languages
  - Official: Odia
- Time zone: UTC+5:30 (IST)
- PIN: 770032
- Telephone code: 0661
- Vehicle registration: OD-14
- Nearest city: Rourkela/Raurkela
- Lok Sabha constituency: Rourkela
- Avg. summer temperature: 40–47 °C (104–117 °F)
- Avg. winter temperature: 8–14 °C (46–57 °F)
- Website: odisha.gov.in

Bondamunda is a part of city of Rourkela, India, and a municipality.

== Railway developments ==
Bondamunda railway station (IR Station code:BNDM) is a railway station under Chakradharpur division of South Eastern Railway zone of Indian Railways. It is a station on the Tatanagar–Bilaspur section of Howrah–Nagpur–Mumbai line.

It connects Sini and Chakardharpur on east direction, Ranchi, Hatia on north direction, Jharsuguda on south direction and Barsuan and Bimlagarh on south direction.

Asia's second largest railway yard is located here. The yard was constructed to feed the raw material and finished product requirements of Rourkela Steel Plant, established in collaboration with Germany. Exchange Yard was constructed for exchange of railway wagons between Rourkela Steel Plant and Indian Railways. Three more yards were constructed: Reception Yard, Classification Yard and Departure Yard for sorting out railway wagons according to the destination. This was the chief marshaling yard of Chakradharpur Division. After the introduction of block-rake concept in Indian Railways, the marshaling yards lost their function. So Reception Yard was shut down and Classification Yard is now used as a stabling yard.

== Railway colony ==
The residents mainly consist of railway employees of multiple ethnicities and religions. The place is surrounded by small hills. The Kali temple of Dumetra is situated on a hill surrounded by forest.

Bondamunda is well connected with Rourkela through various means of local transport (local buses, autorickshaws).

Shopping / market place: Sector-C Main Market, Sector "D" weekly market (twice a week)

== Culture ==
Festivals include Ganesh Puja, Durga Puja, Diwali, Saraswati Puja, Rath (Cart) Yatra, Holi, Balaji Kalyanam, Rama Kalyanam, Ammvari Puja (during summer vacation), Chath Puja, and Christmas. Some festivals like Balaji Kalyanam are performed by the railway employees who belong to Andhra Pradesh, and not only Telugu people but people of all religions participate.

== Education ==
Schools:

- Dream Child English Medium School- Up to UKG;
- S.E.Railway Primary School;
- Kendriya Vidyalay Bondamunda – Up to 10+2 level;
- S.E.Railways M H School – Up to 10+2 level;
- Radha Swami English Medium School. (Affiliated to CBSE Board)
- S.E.Railway Primary & S.E.Railways M H School are affiliated to Odisha Board & others are affiliated to CBSE board
- Madhusudhan Primary, secondary and High School (Odisha Board in Odia Medium)

College:

- College of Arts, Science & Technology, Up to Graduation level

Hospitals:

- S.E.Railway Hospital, Sector -"C"
- Government hospital, "tilkanagar" (since 2019)
