= Bondamunda railway station =

Railway station in Odisha, India

Bondamunda

General information
- Location: Bondamunda, Sundergarh district, Odisha; India
- Coordinates: 22°14′09″N 84°55′31″E
- Elevation: 236 m (774 ft)
- System: Indian Railways junction station
- Owner: Indian Railways
- Operator: South Eastern Railways
- Line: Tatanagar–Bilaspur section of Howrah–Nagpur–Mumbai line
- Platforms: 6
- Tracks: 6 5 ft 6 in (1,676 mm) broad gauge

Construction
- Structure type: Standard (on ground station)
- Parking: Available
- Accessible: Available

Other information
- Status: Functioning
- Station code: BNDM
- Zone(s): South Eastern Railway zone
- Division(s): Chakradharpur

History
- Electrified: 1961–62

Services
| Preceding station | Indian Railways | Following station |
|---|---|---|
| Bisra towards ? | South Eastern Railway zone Tatanagar–Bilaspur section of Howrah–Nagpur–Mumbai line | Rourkela towards ? |
| Terminus | South Eastern Railway zone Bondamunda–Barsuan branch line | Dumetra towards ? |
| Terminus | South Eastern Railway zone Bondamunda–Ranchi lne | Bispur towards ? |
Location
- Location within Odisha Location within India

Bondamunda railway station (station code BNDM), located in the Indian state of Odisha, serves Bondamunda and Rourkela in Sundergarh district.

== History ==
The Nagpur–Asansol main line of Bengal Nagpur Railway came up in 1891 and the cross-country Howrah–Nagpur–Mumbai line started functioning in 1900.

After independence of India, this area saw a lot of activity. In the 1950s when Rourkela Steel Plant was being constructed, a marshalling yard was set up at Bondamunda to cater to the requirements of bulk transportation. New lines were added. A 170 km (106 mi) line was constructed to establish a direct link with Ranchi. Bondamunda was connected to Barsuan iron ore mines in 1960 and the line was extended to Kiriburu in 1964. The marshalling yard is the second largest in India.

Bondamunda was electrified between 1961 and 1962.

== Diesel Loco Shed, Bondamunda ==
| Serial no. | Locomotive class | Horespower | Quantity |
|---|---|---|---|
| 1. | WDG-3A | 3100 | 11 |
| 2. | WDM-3D | 3300 | 1 |
| 3. | WDG-4/4D | 4000/4500 | 129 |
| Total locomotives active as of July 2025 | | | 141 |

== Electric Loco Shed, Bondamunda ==
| Serial no. | Locomotive class | Horsepower | Quantity |
|---|---|---|---|
| 1. | WAP-7 | 6350 | 19 |
| 2. | WAG-5 | 3850 | 2 |
| 3. | WAG-9 | 6120 | 267 |
| 4. | WAG-11 | 12000 | 2 |
| Total locomotives active as of February 2026 | | | 290 |

== Bimlagarh–Talcher Project ==
The 156 km (97 mi) line connecting Bimlagarh on the Bondamunda–Barsuan branch line and Talcher on the Sambalpur–Talcher–Barang branch line, was sanctioned in 2004–05, and construction is in progress. This line, when complete, will reduce the distance between Rourkela and Bhubaneswar, the state capital, from 460 km (via Sambalpur) to 300 km.
