= Birmitrapur railway station =

Railway station in India

Birmitrapur

General information
- Location: Birmitrapur, Odisha; India
- Coordinates: 22°23′44″N 84°44′16″E
- System: Indian Railway Station
- Owner: Ministry of Railways, Indian Railways
- Line: Tatanagar–Bilaspur section
- Platforms: 1
- Tracks: 1

Construction
- Structure type: Standard (On Ground)
- Parking: No

Other information
- Status: Functioning
- Station code: BRMP
- Zone(s): South Eastern Railway
- Division(s): Chakradharpur
Location
- Location within India Location within Odisha

Birmitrapur railway station is a railway station on the South Eastern Railway network in the state of Odisha, India. It serves Birmitrapur town. Its code is BRMP. It has one platform. One Passenger train starts from Birmitrapur railway station.

== See also ==
- Sundergarh district
