= BXF =

BXF or bxf may refer to:

- Broadcast Exchange Format, an SMPTE standard for data exchange in the broadcasting industry
- BXF, the South Eastern Railway station code for Barsuan railway station, Odisha, India
- bxf, the ISO 639-3 code for Bilur language, Papua New Guinea
