= KoelNagar =

Town in Odisha, India

Koelnagar କୋଏଲ ନଗର
- Town
- Koel Nagar
- Map of Odisha Koelnagar (India)
- Coordinates: 22.2654°N 84.8902°E
- Country: India
- State: Odisha
- District: Sundargarh
- Region: Sundargarh

Population (2011)
  - Total: 14,804

Languages
  - Official: Odia
- Time zone: UTC+5:30 (IST)
- Postal code: 769014
- Area code: 0661

Koelnagar (Official name Koel Nagar) is a town in Rourkela, Sundargarh district of Odisha, India. Koelnagar comes under Rourkela municipality as Ward no 28 (A, D, E Block area) and Ward no 29 (B & C Block). As per 2011 Census of India Koelnagar has a population of 14,804 people.
