= Lattikata =

- Town
- Location in Odisha, India Lattikata (India)
- Coordinates: 22.2107°N 84.5901°E
- Country: India
- State: Odisha
- District: Sundargarh

Population
  - Total: 13,500

Languages
  - Official: Odia
- Time zone: UTC+5:30 (IST)
- Vehicle registration: OD
- Website: odisha.gov.in

Lattikata is a census town in Sundargarh district in the Indian state of Odisha.

Transport

Lathikata is connected with Rourkela via Rourkela Deogarh(Earlier NH 27) road.

Nearest city is Rourkela.

Nearest railway station and air port is present at Rourkela.

== Demographics ==
As of 2001 India census, Lattikata had a population of 6896. Males constitute 53% of the population and females 47%. Lattikata has an average literacy rate of 72%, higher than the national average of 59.5%: male literacy is 79%, and female literacy is 65%. In Lattikata, 13% of the population is under 6 years of age. Lathikata is a village with 13500 population. Lathikata is 16 kilometres far away from Rourkela city. Nearest Popular railway station is Rourkela railway station. Education-only one Govt school is present"Deokaran Vidyapith high school " for up to 10th class. Economy-Agriculture.
