= Indian locomotive class WAG-11 =

Indian Railway freight class twin section cab electric locomotive

WAG-11
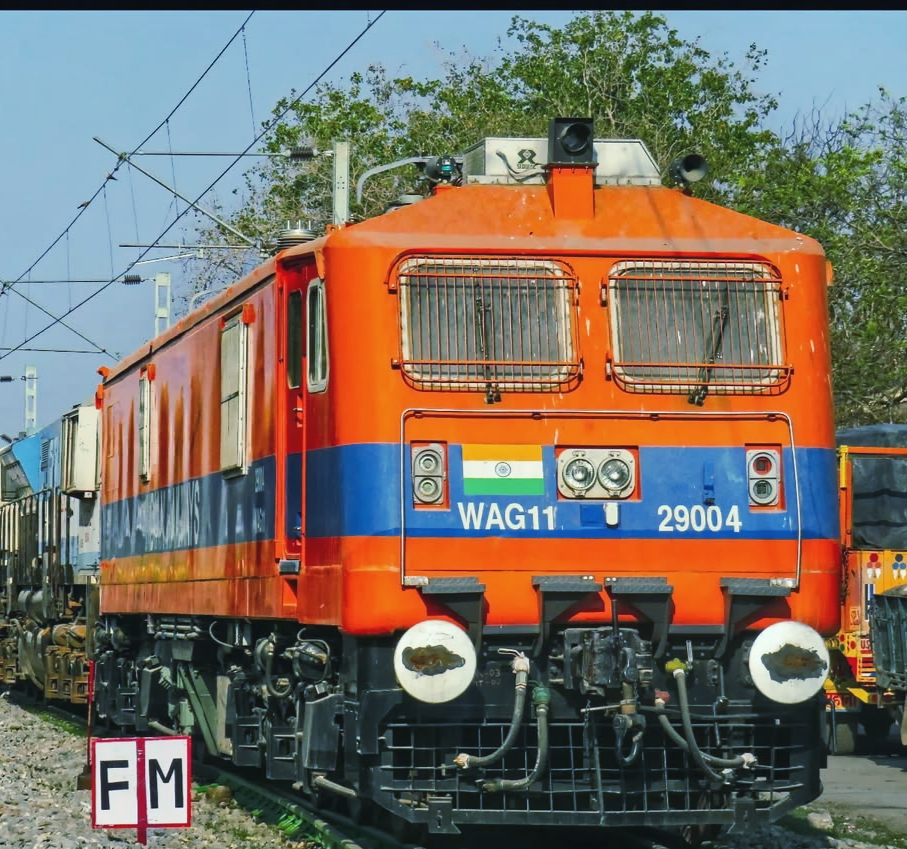
- BNDM based WAG-11 (no. 29004) at BLW yard
Type and origin
- Power type: Electric
- Designer: BLW
- Builder: BLW
- Build date: 2018 – present
- Total produced: 4
- Rebuilder: BLW
- Rebuild date: 2019-01-01
Specifications
- Configuration
  - AAR: Twin C-C, C'C'
  - UIC: Twin Co-Co, Co'Co'
- Gauge: 5 ft 6 in (1,676 mm)
- Trucks: HTSC
- Wheel diameter: New: 1,092 mm (3 ft 7 in); Full-worn: 1,016 mm (3 ft 4 in)
- Length
  - Over beams: 2X 21,244 mm (69 ft 8 in)
- Width: 3,180 mm (10 ft 5 in)
- Height
  - Pantograph: 4,255 mm (14 ft 0 in)
- Axle load: 48,500 lb (22,000 kg)
- Loco weight: 252 tonnes (248 long tons; 278 short tons) 2*126 Ton
- Power supply: 25 kV 50 Hz AC Overhead
- Electric system/s: 25 kV 50 Hz AC Overhead
- Current pickup: WBL - 85 HR pantograph
- Alternator: TA-17-CA6A AC
- Traction motors: 2*6nos.,3-Phase Induction motor, AC traction motors @ 2180V
  - Continuous: 1,000 hp (750 kW)
- Gear ratio: 17:90
- Loco brake: Air Pneumatic Regenerative brake
- Train brakes: Air
- Safety systems: TPWS (Train Protection and Warning System), Vigilance Control, Slip/Slide Control, Main Overload Relay, No Volt Relay, Over Voltage Protection and Earth Fault Relay
- Couplers: H - type transition coupler
Performance figures
- Maximum speed: 105 km/h (65 mph)
- Power output: 12,000 hp (8,950 kW) / 12,000 hp (8,950 kW)
- Tractive effort: 2*540 kN (120,000 lb_{f})
- Brakeforce: 2*270 kN (61,000 lb_{f})
Career
- Operators: Indian Railways
- Numbers: 29001+
- Official name: WAGC4
- Delivered: 2018-09-01
- First run: 2019-01-01
- Disposition: Active
- currently undergoing trials

The Indian locomotive class WAG-11 is a class of twin-section 25 kV AC electric locomotives that was developed in 2018 by Banaras Locomotive Works (BLW), Varanasi for Indian Railways. This freight engine has been designed for a speed of 105 km/h and weighs 252 tons. It is equipped with a three-phase induction motor, four power converters and regenerative as well as pneumatic braking system. The model name stands for broad gauge (W), Alternating Current (A), Goods traffic (G), and 11th in series (11). They entered trials service in 2019. A total of 4 WAG-11 pairs have been built by Banaras Locomotive Works (BLW), Varanasi.

As of January 2023, 4 locomotives are built and are undergoing "testing", with further examples being converted from WDG-4 to WAG-11.

== History ==
The history of WAG-11 begins in the early 2017 with the stated aim of the Indian Railways to minimize the dependence on diesel locomotives in Indian Railways after recommendation of Cabinet Committee on Economic Affairs (CCEA). The committee recommended that Expansion of electrified routes across the country will also help in reducing energy cost. Therefore, a large number of WDG-4 diesel locomotives would become surplus after full electrification. Thus Indian Railways decided to convert existing WDG-4 locomotives which needed midlife overhaul into the WAG-11 electric locomotive class.

The same old GT46MAC (WDG-4) traction motors are being used for WAG-11. The locomotives had GTO propulsion, a few parts can not be leveraged for the rebuilt to IGBT technology. However, since the power supply now comes from the WAG9 transformer / control, ABB has been updating its WAG9 control software for the EMD 3 phase traction motors for best results. As a result, the diesel power pack of the locomotive will be decommissioned and used as spare parts for interim use since there are still 150+ more GTO WDG-4 in use.

The first WAG-11 unit was allocated TKD for trials and performance monitoring. They are fitted with high rise pantographs and have regenerative braking. After initial testing another unit was built and these 2 locomotives were transferred to Bondamuda (BNDM) for examining working conditions hauling heavy load goods trains. The third prototype pair came out of DLW shop but this pair is different from the previous two pairs because both of the locos have twin cabs and twin pantographs and are separately numbered: 29003 and 29004. It looks like they can be separately operated like any regular WAG-9. Also the height and construct of these two locos are extremely similar to WAG-9s.

=== Difference ===
There are quite a few differences between the two earlier prototypes of WAG-11 and 29003/29004. They are in the following lines:

- Instead of an articulated design, DLW made both locos as twin cab locos (they may be able to independently operated after decoupling)
- Two pantographs each on both the locos - making is 4 pantographs for 29003 unit
- The loco shell is placed at the same height as a WAP-7/WAG-9 and is carefully covering the chassis. In earlier versions, the EMD chassis / under-frame was used and was visible. 29003/29004 almost looks like they are made on WAG-9 chassis / under-frame and EMD bogies/traction motors have been used.
- The cow-catcher is new and of typical WAP-7/WAG-9 net design. The solid EMD cowcatcher has been discontinued.
- On top of the cabs, either a dynamic brake radiator or rooftop AC has been installed.

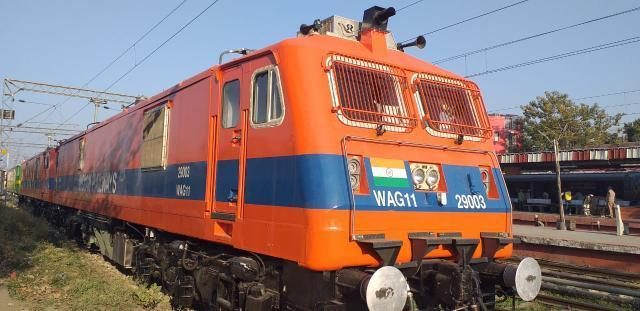
A WAG-11 with the Serial Number of 29003

== Units ==
Locomotives in class
No	Current class	locomotive number	Previous class and Road no	Previous shed	Status
1	WAG-11	29001 (pair)	WDG-4 (12011 & 12018)	Hubli (UBL)	Currently undergoing trials
2	WAG-11	29002 (pair)	WDG-4 (12014 & 12017)	Hubli (UBL)	Currently undergoing trials
3	WAG-11	29003 (single)	WDG-4 (12012)	Hubli (UBL)	Currently undergoing trials
4	WAG-11	29004 (single)	WDG-4 (12013)	Hubli (UBL)	Currently undergoing trials

Comparison of three versions of WAG-11
S.N.	Version 1 (29001)	Version 2 (29002)	Version 3 (29003/29004)
1	Transformer mounted on board.	Transfer under slung mounted.	Transfer under slung mounted.
2	Transformer common to WAP-7/WAG-9.	New design transformer used.	Transformer common to WAG-9.
3	New equipment layout in which both power converters were on left side of loco. One before transformer other behind it.	Equipment layout similar to WAG-9. Both power converters centrally placed above the transformer.	Equipment layout similar to WAG-9.
4	Under slung battery box of WAG-9/WAP-7 used.	Battery placed on board.	Under slung battery box of WAG-9/WAP-7 used.
5	One end cab used.	One end cab used.	Both end cab with HVAC as in WAG-9.
6	Side wall modified from WAP-7 side wall and length increased by approx 3 metres.	Side wall modified from WAP-7 side wall and length increased by approx 3 metres.	Side wall and both cabs same as in WAG-9.
7	Roofs made in 5 parts due to location of power converter and MMD height.	Roof made in 4 parts only as both the traction converters are placed centrally.	Roof in 3 parts same as in WAP-7/WAG-9.
8	Underframe made by modifying WGD-4 underframe.	Underframe made by modifying WGD-4 underframe.	Underframe made by modifying WAP-7 underframe.
Advantages of WAG-11 (version 3) over WAG-11 with modified under-slung transformer: No need to modify WDG-4 underframe, particularly partially cutting center sill, I-beam, and bottom plate.; Exactly similar layout of WAG-9 used.; Transformer common to WAG-9.; Can also work as a single unit.; Cost reduction due to use of complete shell similar to WAG-9 (with some changes for ensuring interfacing with WDG-4 MTA).

Technical Data
1	Type of Service	Freight
2	Axle Arrangement	Twin Co-Co
3	Horse power	2x6000 HP
4	Tractive effort (Stall, Continuous)	2x540 KN (Stall), 2x400 KN (Continuous)
5	Speed Potential	95 kmph (As per final speed certificate)
6	Gear Ratio	17:90
7	Length over buffer	2x21244 mm
8	Overall width	3180 mm
9	Max. height with pantograph locked	4255 mm
10	Total weight	2x126 T
11	Traction Motor	2x6 nos, 3-phase induction motor
12	Power of TM (KW)	703 (Continuous), 758 (one hour rating)
13	Braking	Regenerative, Pneumatic
14	Braking effort	2x270 KN
15	Power supply to aux 1, 2, 3 converter	415 V +/- 10%, 0 to 50 Hz
16	Battery voltage	110 V
17	Power supply to TM	2180 V
18	No of power converters	2

=== For Conversion ===
Railway Board sent a circular to identify 16 WDG-4 locos that would be converted to WAG-11 during the financial year 2020–2021.

No	locomotives class	Previous shed	locomotive number	Status	ref
1.	WDG-4	Hubli (UBL)	12002	to be converted in 2020-2021 by NR	
2.	WDG-4	Hubli (UBL)	12003	conversion scheduled for March 2020	
3.	WDG-4	Hubli (UBL)	12004	conversion scheduled for March 2020	
4.	WDG-4	Hubli (UBL)	12005	to be converted in 2020-2021 by NR	
5.	WDG-4	Hubli (UBL)	12006	to be converted in 2020-2021 by NR	
6.	WDG-4	Hubli (UBL)	12007	converted to WAG-11 #29002	
7.	WDG-4	Hubli (UBL)	12008	conversion scheduled for March 2020	
8.	WDG-4	Hubli (UBL)	12009	conversion scheduled for March 2020	
9.	WDG-4	Hubli (UBL)	12010	scheduled for March 2020	
10.	WDG-4	Hubli (UBL)	12011	converted to 'WAG-11' #29001	
11.	WDG-4	Hubli (UBL)	12012	converted to 'WAG-11' #29003	
12.	WDG-4	Hubli (UBL)	12013	converted to 'WAG-11' #29004	
13.	WDG-4	Hubli (UBL)	12014	converted to 'WAG-11' #29002	
14.	WDG-4	Hubli (UBL)	12015	to be converted in 2020-2021 by SR	
15.	WDG-4	Krishnarajapuram (KJM)	12016	to be converted in 2020-2021 by SR	
16.	WDG-4	Hubli (UBL)	12017	converted to 'WAG-11' #29002	
17.	WDG-4	Hubli (UBL)	12018	converted to 'WAG-11' #29001	
18.	WDG-4	Hubli (UBL)	12019	to be converted in 2020-2021 by SR	
19.	WDG-4	Hubli (UBL)	12020	to be converted in 2020-2021 by SR	
20.	WDG-4	Krishnarajapuram (KJM)	12021	to be converted in 2020-2021 by SR	
21.	WDG-4	Hubli (UBL)	12022	to be converted in 2020-2021 by SER	
22.	WDG-4	Hubli (UBL)	12023	to be converted in 2020-2021 by SER	
23.	WDG-4	Hubli (UBL)	12024	to be converted in 2020-2021 by SER	
24.	WDG-4	Krishnarajapuram (KJM)	12025	to be converted in 2020-2021 by SR	
25.	WDG-4	Krishnarajapuram (KJM)	12026	to be converted in 2020-2021 by SCR	
26.	WDG-4	Krishnarajapuram (KJM)	12027	to be converted in 2020-2021 by SCR	
27.	WDG-4	Krishnarajapuram (KJM)	12028	to be converted in 2020-2021 by SCR	
28.	WDG-4	Krishnarajapuram (KJM)	12029	to be converted in 2020-2021 by SCR	
29.	WDG-4	Krishnarajapuram (KJM)	12030	to be converted in 2020-2021 by SER	

== Locomotive shed ==
Zone	Name	Shed code	Quantity
SER	Bondamunda	BNDM	4
Total Locomotives Active as of May 2025			4

== See also ==
- Rail transport in India § History
- Locomotives of India
- Rail transport in India
- Indian locomotive class WDG-4
