= Jalda =

- Town
- Location in Odisha, India Jalda (India)
- Coordinates: 22.191°N 84.8428°E
- Country: India
- State: Odisha
- District: Sundargarh

Population (2001)
  - Total: 11,957

Languages
  - Official: Odia
- Time zone: UTC+5:30 (IST)
- PIN: 769043
- Vehicle registration: OD-14
- Website: odisha.gov.in

Jalda is a census town in Rourkela city of Sundargarh district in the Indian state of Odisha.

== Demographics ==
As of 2001 India census, Jalda had a population of 11,957. Males constitute 51% of the population and females 49%. Jalda has an average literacy rate of 63%, higher than the national average of 59.5%: male literacy is 73%, and female literacy is 52%. In Jalda, 12% of the population is under 6 years of age. Jalda is divided into Jalda A Block, Jalda B Block and Jalda C Block.
