= Bimalgarh Junction railway station =

Railway station in Odisa, India

Bimalgarh Junction

General information
- Location: Bimalgarh, Odisha; India
- Coordinates: 21°58′04″N 85°00′35″E
- System: Indian Railways station
- Owner: Ministry of Railways, Indian Railways
- Line: Tatanagar–Bilaspur section
- Platforms: 1
- Tracks: 1

Construction
- Structure type: Standard (on ground)
- Parking: No

Other information
- Status: Functioning
- Station code: BUF
- Zone(s): South Eastern Railway
- Division(s): Chakradharpur
Location
- Location within India Location within Odisha

Bimalgarh Junction railway station is a railway station on the South Eastern Railway network in the state of Odisha, India. It serves Bimalgarh village. Its code is BUF. It has one platform. Passenger trains halt at Bimalgarh Junction railway station.

== See also ==
- Sundergarh district
