= Biramitrapur =

- Town
- Location in Odisha, India Biramitrapur (India)
- Coordinates: 22.40°N 84.77°E
- Country: India
- State: Odisha
- District: Sundargarh
- Elevation: 243 m (797 ft)

Population (2011)
  - Total: 33,442

Languages
  - Official: Odia
- Time zone: UTC+5:30 (IST)
- Website: odisha.gov.in

Biramitrapur (or Birmitrapur) is a town and a municipality in Sundargarh district in the state of Odisha, India.

== Geography ==
Biramitrapur lies at the border of Odisha and Jharkhand, Simdega being the nearest district of Jharkhand. The city nearest to Biramitrapur is Rourkela, which is roughly around 35 km away. The area being mineral rich, a lot of industries lie in and around Biramitrapur. The area is especially rich in limestone and dolomite. The closest river to Biramitrapur is Ludki, which flows from Jharkhand to Odisha.

- Biramitrapur Post Office is now Operating Core Banking Solution (CBS) online for their customers of Saving Bank Accounts.
- One Postal ATM Counter is also operational inside Post Office Compound.

== Education ==
Biramitrapur also has institutions imparting educations at different mediums and different levels.

Major Institutions -:

ST. Mary's Convent School, ICSE, New Delhi[English medium], run by Handmaids of Mary Sisters of Roman Catholic Church open for all religion students which is the premium institute of the town. Having result of 100%.

Sri Aurobindo Integral Education and Research Center, CBSE (English medium)

Don Bosco School (oriya medium) Also a christian institute...

Sishu Vidya Mandir School, (oriya medium)

Alexander school (oriya medium)

Jagriti high school (Oriya medium)

Govt. Boy's high school [Oriya medium]

Govt. Girls high school [Oriya medium]

Shrama Shakti College [Intermediate & graduation][Arts & Commerce]

Nirmal munda Science college.

== Demographics ==
As of 2001 India census, Biramitrapur had a population of 29,434. Males constitute 51% of the population and females 49%. Biramitrapur has an average literacy rate of 63%, higher than the national average of 59.5%; with male literacy of 71% and female literacy of 55%. 13% of the population is under 6 years of age.

== Industries ==
The majority industries in Biramitrapur and adjoining areas are based on mining. There are many Limestone mining and crushing units, and also many Sponge iron factories. BSL (Bisra Stone Lime) company holds the largest limestone and Dolomite quarry in the area.

== Transport ==
Birmitrapur has a number of bus services. A train also runs from Birmitrapur to Barsuan via Rourkela.

== Culture ==
The official and communication language of this region is Odia. The local people speak Sundargadi Odia, the most spoken language variant of northwestern part of Odisha. Due to close proximity to Jharkhand, the second most spoken language is Sadri. The Odia and Sadri languages have similarities due to social and cultural exchanges between Odisha and Jharkhand regions since ancient times.

The Hindi, Bengali, Marwari and Bihari language speakers also found in the town as Birmitrapur was a cosmopolitan mining town and people from deafferent parts of the country settled here since British era. Biramitrapur has a composite population of people from different states and religions.

Major festivals celebrated like Hindu festivals of Rath Yatra, Nuakhai, Durga Puja and Ganesh Puja are celebrated with much pomp and fair as are New Year and Christmas.

== Politics ==
Current MLA from Biramitrapur Assembly Constituency is Shri Shankar Oram(2019) [Independent], who won the seat in State elections of 2009. Earlier MLAs from this seat were: Nihar Surin of (JMM) who won in 2004, George Tirkey of JMM in 2000 and in 1995, Satya Narayan Pradhan of JD in 1990, Remish Kerketia of INC in 1985, Jumus Bilung of INC(I) in 1980, and Prem Chand Bhagat of JNP in 1977.

Biramitrapur is part of Sundargarh (Lok Sabha constituency).
