= Garpos railway station =

Railway station in India

Garpos

General information
- Location: Garpos, Odisha; India
- Coordinates: 22°08′05″N 84°25′14″E
- System: Indian Railway Station
- Owner: Ministry of Railways, Indian Railways
- Line: Tatanagar–Bilaspur section
- Platforms: 3
- Tracks: 3

Construction
- Structure type: Standard (On Ground)
- Parking: No

Other information
- Status: Functioning
- Station code: GPH
- Zone(s): South Eastern Railway
- Division(s): Chakradharpur
Location
- Location within India Location within Odisha

Garpos railway station is a railway station on the South Eastern Railway network in the state of Odisha, India. It serves Garpos village. Its code is GPH. It has three platforms. Passenger, Express and Superfast trains halt at Garpos railway station.

== Major Trains ==
- Tapaswini Express
- Rourkela - Gunupur Rajya Rani Express
- Samaleshwari Express
- Ispat Express

== See also ==
- Sundergarh district
