= Kalunga railway station =

Railway station in India

Kalunga

General information
- Location: Kalunga, Odisha; India
- Coordinates: 22°13′19″N 84°44′03″E
- System: Indian Railway Station
- Owner: Ministry of Railways, Indian Railways
- Line: Tatanagar–Bilaspur section
- Platforms: 3
- Tracks: 3

Construction
- Structure type: Standard (On Ground)
- Parking: No

Other information
- Status: Functioning
- Station code: KLG
- Zone(s): South Eastern Railway
- Division(s): Chakradharpur
Location
- Location within India Location within Odisha

Kalunga railway station is a railway station on the South Eastern Railway network in the state of Odisha, India. It serves Kalunga village. Its code is KLG. It has three platforms. Passenger, Express and Superfast trains halt at Kalunga railway station.

== Major Trains ==
- Tapaswini Express
- Samaleshwari Express

== See also ==
- Sundergarh district
