= Jaraikela railway station =

Railway station in India

Jaraikela

General information
- Location: Jaraikela, Odisha; India
- Coordinates: 22°18′38″N 85°06′56″E
- System: Indian Railway Station
- Owner: Ministry of Railways, Indian Railways
- Line: Tatanagar–Bilaspur section
- Platforms: 2
- Tracks: 2

Construction
- Structure type: Standard (On Ground)
- Parking: No

Other information
- Status: Functioning
- Station code: JRA
- Zone(s): South Eastern Railway
- Division(s): Chakradharpur
Location
- Location within India

Jaraikela railway station is a railway station on the South Eastern Railway network in the state of Odisha, India. It serves Jaraikela village. Its code is JRA. It has two platforms. Passenger, and Express trains halt at Jaraikela railway station.

== See also ==
- Sundergarh district
