= Collieries Division =

Unit of government-owned steel producer

SAIL Collieries Division is a central unit of the Steel Authority of India Limited (SAIL) looking after the collieries in Jharkhand and West Bengal.

There are four operating collieries under Collieries Division: Chasnala Colliery, Jitpur Colliery, Ramnagar Colliery, and Tasra Colliery. Chasnala, Jitpur and Tasra Collieries are for coking coal, and Ramnagar is for power coal.

There is also a coal preparation plant in Chasnala under the Collieries Division.

The office of the Collieries Division is located at Chasnala.
