= Steel Authority of India Limited =

Indian public sector steel manufacturer

- Type: Public
- Traded as: NSE: SAIL; BSE: 500113; LSE: SAUD
- Industry: Steel
- Founded: 19 January 1954; 72 years ago
- Headquarters: New Delhi, India
- Key people: Dr. Ashok Kumar Panda (Chairman and Managing Director)
- Products: Steel, Metal R&D, flat steel products, long steel products, wire products, Wheel & axle for Indian Railways, plates
- Revenue: ▲₹110,810 crore (US$12 billion) (2026)
- Operating income: ▲₹13,146 crore (US$1.4 billion) (2026)
- Net income: ▲₹3,233 crore (US$340 million) (2026)
- Total assets: ▲₹128,450 crore (US$13 billion) (2026)
- Total equity: ▲₹58,195 crore (US$6.0 billion) (2026)
- Owner: Government of India
- Number of employees: 49,820 (2026)
- Subsidiaries: NSPCL
- Website: www.sail.co.in

Steel Authority of India Limited (SAIL) is an Indian public sector steel manufacturing corporation based in New Delhi designated as Maharatna CPSE. It is the largest government-owned steel producer, with an annual production of 18.29 million metric tons. Incorporated on 24 January 1973, SAIL has 50,001 employees and is under the administrative control of the Ministry of Steel.

SAIL operates and owns five integrated steel plants at Bhilai, Rourkela, Durgapur, Bokaro and Burnpur (Asansol) and three special steel plants at Salem, Durgapur and Bhadravathi. It also owns a Ferro Alloy plant at Chandrapur. It also has an R&D Centre for Iron & Steel (RDCIS) and a Centre for Engineering in Ranchi, Jharkhand.

The company has a total of 692 patents globally, out of which 343 have been granted. More than 64% of the 692 patents are active. SAIL has filed the maximum number of patents in India, followed by Egypt and Germany.

== History ==
=== 1959–1973 ===
SAIL traces its origin to the Hindustan Steel Limited (HSL), which was set up on 19 January 1954. It was initially designed to manage only one plant that was coming up at Rourkela.

For Bhilai and Durgapur Steel Plants, the preliminary work was done by the Iron and Steel Ministry. From April 1957, the supervision and control of these two steel plants were also transferred to Hindustan Steel. The registered office was originally in New Delhi. It moved to Calcutta in July 1956, and ultimately to Ranchi in December 1959.

A new steel company, Bokaro Steel Limited (Bokaro Steel Plant), was incorporated on 29 January 1964 to construct and operate the steel plant at Bokaro. The 1 MT phases of Bhilai and Rourkela Steel Plants were completed by the end of December 1961. The 1 MT phase of Durgapur Steel Plant was completed in January 2008.

After the commissioning of the Wheel and Axle plant. The crude steel production of HSL went up from 1.58 MT (1959–60) to 1.6 MT. The second phase of the Bhilai Steel Plant was completed in September 1967 after the commissioning of the Wire Rod Mill. The last unit of the 1.8 MT phase of Rourkela – the Tandem Mill – was commissioned in February 1968, and the 1.6 MT stage of Durgapur Steel Plant was completed in August 1969 after commissioning of the furnace in SMS. Thus, with the completion of the 2.5 MT stage at Bhilai, 1.8 MT at Rourkela, and 1.6 MT at Durgapur, the total crude steel production capacity of HSL rose to 3.7 MT in 1968–69 and 4 MT in 1972–73. IISCO was taken over as a subsidiary in 1978 and later merged in 2006.

The hot metal production capacity of the company will further increase and is expected to reach 50 MT per annum by 2025.

=== Holding Company ===
The Ministry formulated a policy statement to revamp industry management, which was presented to Parliament on 2 December 1972. This initiative proposed creating a holding company to oversee both inputs and outputs. Thus, the Steel Authority of India Ltd. (SAIL) was established on 24 January 1973, with an authorized capital of ₹2,000 crore (US$250 million). SAIL's mandate included managing five integrated steel plants and two specialty plants. In 1978, SAIL underwent restructuring to function as an operating company.

== Major units ==
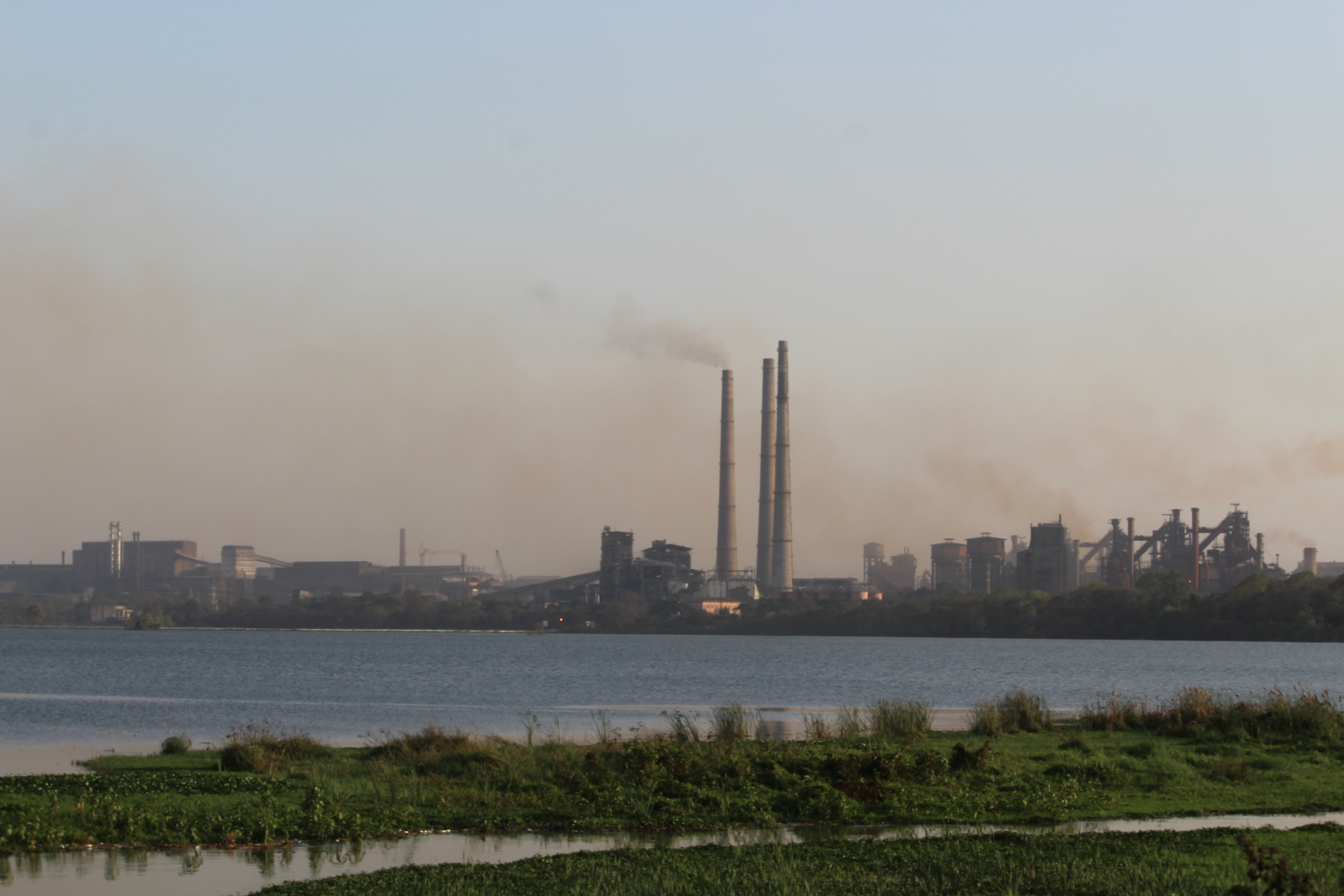
Bokaro Steel Plant at Bokaro

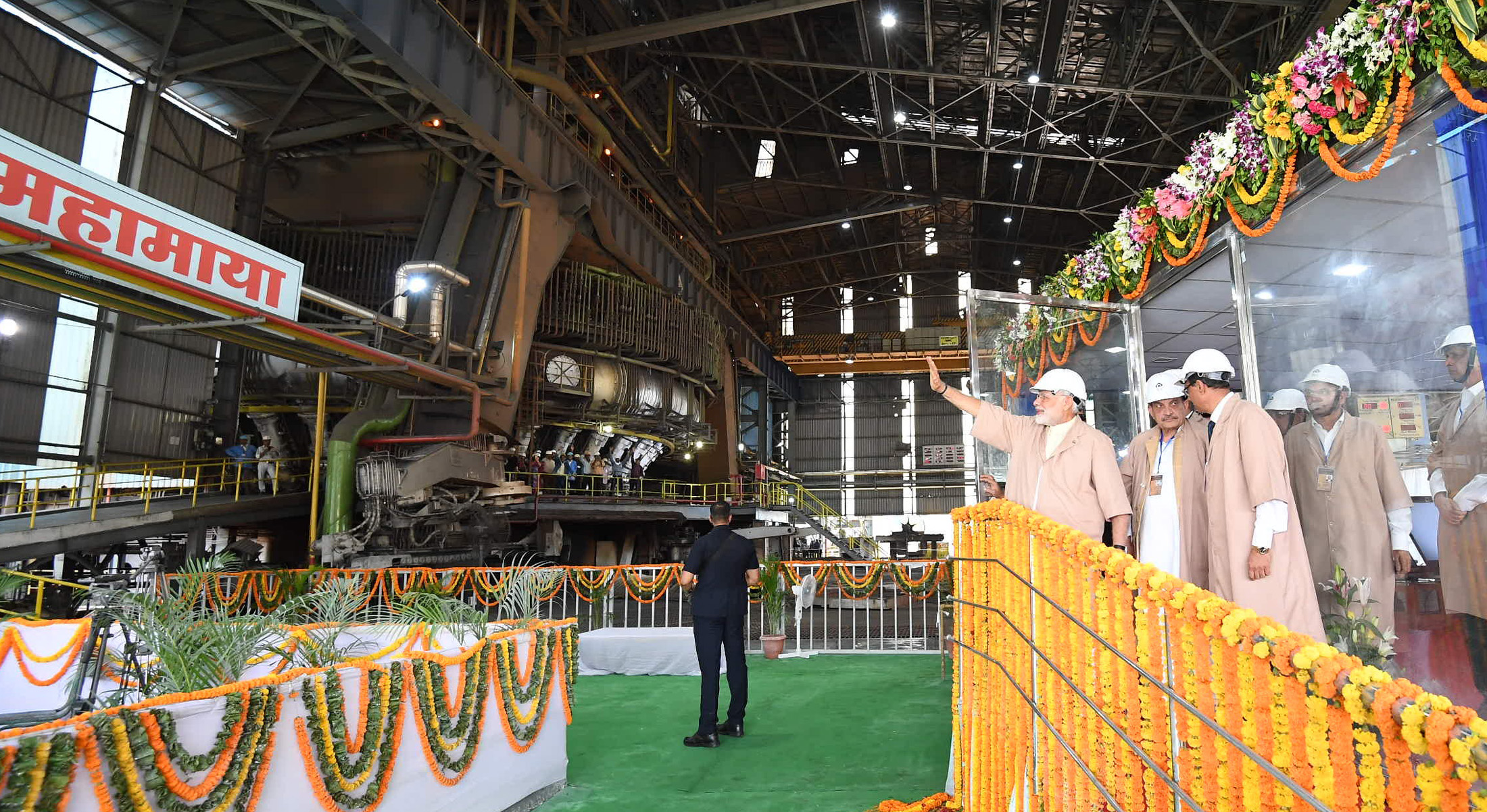
Bhilai Steel Plant at Bhilai

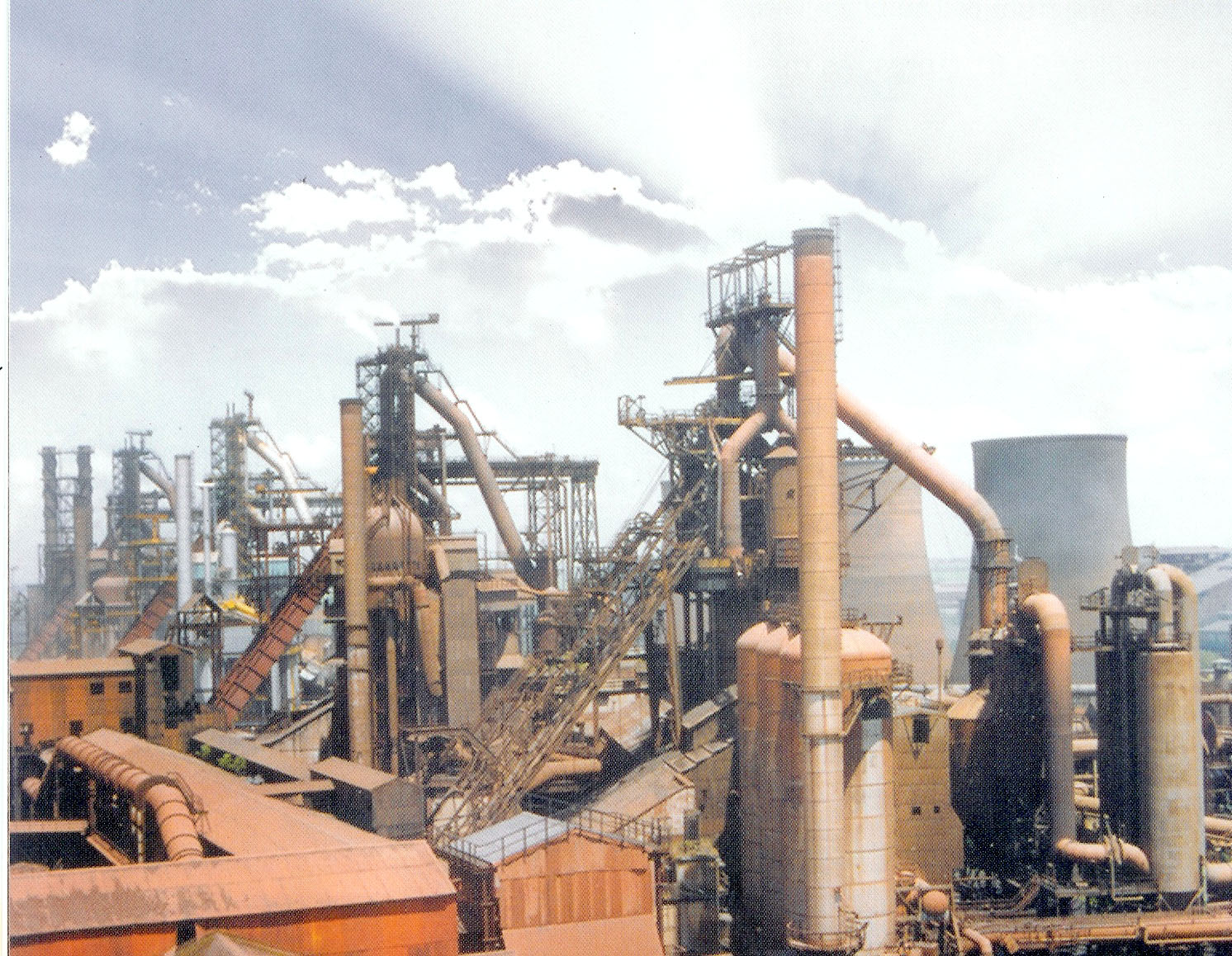
Durgapur Steel plant

SAIL Integrated Steel Plants

1. Rourkela Steel Plant (RSP); India's first integrated steel plant in the public sector, established through collaboration with Germany.
2. Bhilai Steel Plant (BSP) in Chhattisgarh set up with Soviet collaboration (1959)
3. Durgapur Steel Plant (DSP) at Durgapur, West Bengal set up with British collaboration (1959)
4. Bokaro Steel Plant (BSL) in Jharkhand (1964) set up with Soviet collaboration (The Plant is hailed as the country's first Swadeshi steel plant, built with maximum indigenous content in terms of equipment, material, and know-how)
5. IISCO Steel Plant (ISP) at Burnpur in Asansol, West Bengal (Plant equipped with largest blast furnace of country, modernized in 2015 with investment of 16000 crore which will yield total production of 2.9 million tons annually)

Special Steel Plants

1. Alloy Steel Plant (ASP), Durgapur, West Bengal supplies to the Indian Ordnance Factories
2. Salem Steel Plant (SSP), Maramangalathupatti, at Salem, Tamil Nadu
3. Visvesvaraya Iron and Steel Limited (VISL), at Bhadravathi, Karnataka

Ferro Alloy Plant

1. Chandrapur Ferro Alloy Plant (CFP) in Maharashtra

Refractory Plants - SAIL Refractory Unit (SRU)

1. SAIL Refractory Unit, Bhandaridah in Jharkhand
2. SAIL Refractory Unit, Bhilai in Chhattisgarh
3. SAIL Refractory Unit, IFICO, Ramgarh in Jharkhand
4. SAIL Refractory Unit, Ranchi Road in Jharkhand

== Central units ==
1. Central Marketing Organisation
2. Centre for Engineering and Technology
3. Research and Development Centre for Iron and Steel
4. SAIL Consultancy Organisation
5. Environment Management Division
6. Management Training Institute, Ranchi
7. Central Coal Supply Organisation
8. SAIL Collieries Division
9. SAIL Growth Works
10. SAIL Safety Organisation
11. SAIL Digital Transformation Division, Ranchi
12. SAIL Refractory Company Ltd.

== Joint ventures ==
=== NTPC SAIL Power Company Limited (NSPCL) ===
A 50:50 joint venture between Steel Authority of India Ltd. (SAIL) and National Thermal Power Corporation Ltd. (NTPC Ltd.). It manages the captive power plants at Rourkela, Durgapur, and Bhilai with a combined capacity of 314 MW. It has installed additional capacity by the implementation of a 500 MW (2 x 250 MW Units) power plant at Bhilai. The commercial generation of Unit 1 commenced in April 2009, and that of Unit 2 in October 2009.

- NSPCL, Rourkela (2 x 60 MW)
- NSPCL, Durgapur (2 x 60 MW)
- NSPCL, Bhilai (2 x 30 MW + 1 x 14 MW)

During FY2013-14, NSPCL generated 6156.091 MU of electricity with a PLF of 86.33%

=== Bokaro Power Supply Company Pvt. Ltd. (BPSCL) ===
Established in 2001, A 50:50 joint venture between Steel Authority of India Ltd. (SAIL) and Damodar Valley Corporation (DVC) and is engaged in power and steam generation and supplies power and steam (at various pressures) to SAIL's Bokaro Steel Plant (BSL) located at Bokaro for meeting the process requirement of BSL.

The plant has 9 boilers (5 boilers each of 220 TPH, 3 boilers each of 260 TPH capacity, and 1 boiler of 300 TPH) and 7 turbine generators (one 12 MW back-pressure turbine generator (TG), 2 TGs each of 55MW capacity, 3 TGs each of 60 MW capacity, and one 36 MW back-pressure turbine generator. Gg

| TPP | BOILER | CAPACITY(T/Hr) | DATE OF COMMISSIONING | MAKE | TYPE |
|---|---|---|---|---|---|
| TPP | 1 | 220 | 17.04.1972 | Kransy Kotelsic, Russia | Tπ-156 |
| TPP | 2 | 220 | 14.07.1972 | Kransy Kotelsic, Russia | Tπ-156 |
| TPP | 3 | 220 | 06.04.1974 | Kransy Kotelsic, Russia | Tπ-156 |
| TPP | 4 | 220 | 15.07.1980 | Kransy Kotelsic, Russia | Tπ-156 |
| TPP | 5 | 220 | 23.06.1980 | Kransy Kotelsic, Russia | Tπ-156 |
| | TOTAL | 1100 | | | |
| CPP | 6 | 260 | 14.11.1985 | Rafaco, Poland | OPG-260 |
| CPP | 7 | 260 | 30.07.1988 | Rafaco, Poland | OPG-260 |
| CPP | 8 | 260 | 19.02.1989 | Rafaco, Poland | OPG-260 |
| | TOTAL | 780 | | | |
| UNIT 9 | 9 | 300 | 02.09.2014 | Alstom India | PCSM00 6071 |
| | TOTAL | 2180 | | | |

| TPP | TURBINE | CAPACITY(MW) | DATE OF COMMISSIONING | MAKE | TYPE |
|---|---|---|---|---|---|
| TPP | 1 | 12 (BPTG) | 31.12.1974 | Kaluga Russia | P-12-90-37 |
| TPP | 2 | 55 | 13.07.1972 | LMZ Russia | K-50-90-4 |
| TPP | 3 | 55 | 13.10.1973 | LMZ Russia | K-50-90-4 |
| | TOTAL | 122 | | | |
| CPP | 6 | 60 | 25.01.1986 | Zamech Poland | 9K-66 |
| CPP | 7 | 60 | 16.09.1988 | Zamech Poland | 9K-66 |
| CPP | 8 | 60 | 31.03.1989 | Zamech Poland | 9K-66 |
| | TOTAL | 180 | | | |
| UNIT 9 | 9 | 36 (BPTG) | 02.09.2014 | Skoda, Czech Rep. | PCSM006 071 |
| | TOTAL | 338 | With 660 TPH (Steam to BSL) | | |

=== Mjunction services limited ===
Mjunction Services Limited, operating in Information Technology and the Internet, is a 50:50 venture promoted by SAIL and TATA Steel. Founded in February 2001, it is today not only India's largest e-commerce company (having eTransacted worth over Rs. 900 billion till date) but also runs the world's largest eMarketplace for steel.

=== Bhilai JP Cement Ltd ===
SAIL has incorporated a joint venture company with M/s Jaiprakash Associates Ltd to set up a 2.2 MT slag-based cement plant at Bhilai. The company shall commence cement production at Bhilai by March'2010, whereas clinker production at Satna shall start within 2009.

=== Bokaro JP Cement Ltd ===
SAIL has incorporated another joint venture company with M/s JaiPrakash Associates Ltd to set up a 2.1 MT cement plant at Bokaro utilising slag from BSL. The project implementation is in progress, with the commencement of cement production likely by July 2011. Bokaro Jaypee cement plant opening ceremony was held by the chief minister of Jharkhand shri. Arjun Munda in 2012.

=== SAIL&MOIL Ferro Alloys (Pvt.) Limited ===
SAIL has incorporated a joint venture company with Manganese Ore (India) Ltd on 50:50 basis to produce ferro-manganese and silico-manganese required for the production of steel.

=== International Coal Ventures Pvt. Limited ===
International Coal Ventures Private Limited is a special purpose vehicle set up to achieve the target of making steel PSUs self-reliant in the area of coking coal, a joint venture company has been incorporated composed of five central PSU companies i.e. SAIL, Rashtriya Ispat Nigam Limited (RINL), Coal India Limited and other target countries.

=== Development of Hajigak iron ore mines in Afghanistan ===
A consortium comprising state-owned NMDC and RINL and private sector steel players—JSW, JSW Ispat, Jindal Steel and Power, and Monnet Ispat and Energy and led by SAIL, plan to invest US$75 million in first phase for the development of Hajigak iron ore mines in Afghanistan. The consortium, in November 2011, had won the mining rights for three iron ore mines which are said to contain 1.28 billion tonnes of rich reserves.

=== Development of mines through outsourcing ===
SAIL has decided to outsource development of two virgin iron ore mines at Rowghat in Chhattisgarh and Chiria in Jharkhand with an annual capacity of 14 and 15 million tonnes, respectively. The development of each mine is likely to cost between ₹1,000 crore (US$100 million) – ₹1,200 crore (US$120 million).

=== SAIL SCL Limited ===
A 50:50 JV with Government of Kerala where SAIL has management control to revive the existing facilities at Steel Complex Ltd, Calicut and also to set up, develop and manage a TMT rolling mill of 65,000 MT capacity along with balancing facilities and auxiliaries.

=== International Coal Ventures Private Limited ===
ICVL is a joint venture of five companies owned by the Indian government. Aside from Steel Authority of India Limited, the other venturers are Coal India, Rashtriya Ispat Nigam, National Minerals Development Corporation and National Thermal Power Corporation. ICVL acquired a 65 percent stake in the Benga coal mine from Rio Tinto in July 2014.

=== SAIL RITES Bengal Wagon Industry Pvt. Limited ===
SAIL had signed a 50:50 joint venture with RITES for setting up a wagon components manufacturing facility at Kulti in West Bengal's Paschim Bardhaman district. The total investment for this project was ₹205 crore (equivalent to ₹502 crore or US$52 million in 2026) in West Bengal, and commercial production began from December 2016. It manufactures, sells, markets, distributes and exports railway wagons, including high-end specialised wagons, wagon prototypes, fabricated components/parts of railway vehicles, rehabilitation of industrial locomotives, etc., for the domestic market.

== Ownership and management ==
The Government of India owns about 65% of SAIL's equity and retains voting control of the company. However, SAIL, by virtue of its Maharatna status in May 2010, enjoys significant operational and financial autonomy.

Dr. Ashok Kumar Panda is the current Chairman and Managing Director (CMD).

== Operations ==
As of 31 March 2015, SAIL has 93,352 employees, as compared to 170,368 (as of 31 March 2002). There has been a continuous reduction of headcount over the past few years due to enhanced productivity and rationalised manpower.

The total requirement of its main raw material, iron ore, is met through its captive mines. To meet its growing requirement, capacities of existing iron ore mines are being expanded and new iron ore mines are being developed. In addition, new iron ore deposits in the states of Rajasthan, Chhattisgarh, Madhya Pradesh, Maharashtra, Odisha and Karnataka are being explored. Around 24% of its coking coal requirements are met from domestic sources, the remaining through imports. For improving coking coal security, the company is also making efforts for development of new coking coal blocks at Tasra and Sitanalla. SAIL is also India's largest miner of minerals that are involved in the steel making process, such as iron ore and coking coal. During FY 2019–2020, the company mined 32.406 million tonnes of steel making minerals.

SAIL produced 13.9 million tonnes of crude steel by operating at 103% of its installed capacity, which is an increase of 1% over the previous year. It also generated 710 MW of electricity during FY2014-15.

SAIL records turnover of over Rs 1 lakh crore. Steel Authority of India Ltd (SAIL) produced 18.733 million tonnes of hot metal and 17.366 million tonnes of crude steel during 2021–22, its best ever production performance. The increase in turnover coupled with improved operational performance, helped the company achieve its highest-ever numbers in terms of profitability.

== Awards and accolades ==
- "Best of all" Rajiv Gandhi National Quality Award in 1993, 2006, and 2007 for their Bhilai and Bokaro plants
- Quality Summit New York Gold Trophy 2007 (International Award for Excellence & Business Prestige) and Award of Excellence Maintenance for Sumitomo Heavy Industry & TSUBKIMOTO-KOGIO, Japan won by Alloy Steel Plant, Durgapur.
- SAIL was featured in the 2008 list of Forbes Global 2000 companies at position 647.
- Golden Peacock Award for Combating Climate Change – 2008 for BSP, Occupational Health and Safety- 2008 for BSL
- National Safety Award to Bhilai Steel Plant announced by the Ministry of Labour & Employment, Government of India – 2008
- Durgapur Steel Plant won the 2nd Prize in the Association of Business Communicators of India Awards – 2008.
- Ispat Bhasha Bharati. the Rajbhasha Journal of SAIL has been awarded with the first prize under the All India House Journal Award Scheme – 2008–09
- Salem Steel Plant received the Greentech Gold Award in Metal and Mining Sector – 2008–09.
- Golden Peacock Award for Corporate Social Responsibility won by Bhilai Steel Plant (BSP) for the third year in a row – 2009.
- Rourkela Steel Plant collected the Srishti Good Green Governance (G-Cube) Award – 2009.
- Greentech HR Excellence Award secured by the Durgapur Steel Plant – 2009
- The steel township of Rourkela Steel Plant (RSP) has been ranked 14th in sanitation and cleanliness by Union Urban Development Ministry – 2009–10
- Greentech Safety Gold Award was given to Bhilai Steel Plant – 2010
- The HR Excellence Award by the Greentech Foundation won by Bhilai Steel Plant – 2010
- SSP has won the Greentech Silver Award in Training Category of Greentech HR Excellence Awards – 2010.
- Award for financial and operational strength by Indian Institute of Industrial Engineering (IIIE)- 2009–10
- Golden Peacock Environment Management Award – 2011
- Randstad NV Award for HR Practices and Employer Branding under 'Manufacturing Industries' category – 2011
- Maiden Wockhardt Shining Star CSR Award in the Iron & Steel Sector category – 2011.
- Salem Steel Plant (SSP) has won the National Sustainability Award for the 6th time in succession and 13th time since inception of the award from Indian Institute of Metals (IIM)- 2011

Of the 33 Prime Minister's Shram Awards announced for 2010 by the Ministry of Labour, Government of India, 17 of which went to PSUs, SAIL employees won 11 awards. Of the total number of 76 awardees for the year, 45 belong to SAIL – a remarkable distinction for any organisation. Maharatna SAIL has received the Golden Peacock Environment Management Award for the year 2011. The award, in recognition of SAIL's initiatives and achievements in the field of environment management, was presented by Union Minister for Home Affairs Shri P. Chidambaram on 24 June 2011

74 of a total of 128 awardees who have won the Vishwakarma Rashtriya Puraskar (VRP) are from SAIL. The 15 out of 28 awards won by SAIL went to our 74 employees for the performance year 2008. Bhilai Steel Plant won 7 such awards involving 36 employees, Bokaro Steel Plant won 6 awards involving 29 employees. Durgapur Steel Plant and Salem Steel Plant both won 1 award each involving five and four employees respectively. SAIL employees have won 4 out of 5 awards of Class A, which is the highest number of A Class awards won by any PSU in India.

== Future plans ==
SAIL is in the process of modernising and expanding its production units, raw material resources and other facilities to maintain its dominant position in the Indian steel market. The aim is to increase the production capacity from the base level production of 14.6 MT per annum (2006–07) to 26.2 MT per annum of hot metal.

The following table shows the increased production of various items prior to and post expansion.

On 25 May 2012, Steel Authority of India Limited entered into a Memorandum of Understanding with the Government of West Bengal and Burn Standard Company Ltd. for setting up of a Railway Wagon factory of approximately ₹210 crore (US$22 million). This project will create an approximate 75,300 jobs.

The company also looking to establish one full capacity integrated plant in Andhra Pradesh or Telangana and surveying the possibilities to set up the plant. The plant, which was proposed to be the first steel plant of such scale in the state, was estimated to get an investment of Rs. 4,400 crore.

== See also ==
- List of steel producers
- Steel production by country
