= Benga coal mine =

Benga Coal Mine
Location
- Location: Tete, Tete Province, Mozambique

Production
- Products: Coking coal

The Benga Coal Mine is a coal mine located in Tete, Changara District, Tete Province, Mozambique. The mine has coal reserves amounting to 1.9 billion tonnes of coking coal, one of the largest coal reserves in Africa and the world. The mine is operating and is currently producing prime hard coking coal and thermal coal.

In mid-2014 the mine was producing 5 million tonnes per annum, with the potential to double that. The mine is said to have state-of-the-art wash plant and surface infrastructure.

The main challenge facing the mine is its ability to transport coal to India as the Mozambique government in the past has prevented its barges from using the Zambezi River.

== Ownership ==
ICVL, a joint venture of five companies owned by the Indian government comprising Steel Authority of India, Coal India, Rashtriya Ispat Nigam, National Minerals Development Corporation and National Thermal Power Corporation, now owns 65 percent of the Benga coal mine. The other 35% is owned by Tata Steel, a subsidiary of Tata Group.

Rio Tinto Group acquired 65 percent of the mine in 2011 when it bought Riversdale Mining for $3.9 billion. In July 2014 the ownership changed when International Coal Ventures Private Limited acquired Rio Tinto's interest in Benga and other mines and exploration projects in the Tete province of Mozambique. Rio Tinto by this time had almost written off the assets, selling them to ICVL for just $50 million.
