= Quarry Siding railway station =

Railway Station in Odisha, India

General information
- Location: Omfed Road, Sector 9, Rourkela, Odisha; India
- Coordinates: 22.2567°N 84.7995°E
- Elevation: 108 metres (354 ft)
- System: Indian Railways station
- Owner: Indian Railways
- Operator: Chakradharpur railway division
- Line: Birmitrapur–Rourkela line
- Platforms: 2
- Tracks: 4 (single electrified BG)
- Connections: Auto stand

Construction
- Structure type: Standard (on-ground station)
- Parking: No
- Cycle facilities: No

Other information
- Status: Functioning
- Station code: QRS
- Division(s): Allahabad
- Fare zone: South Eastern Railway
Location
- Location within Odisha Location within India

Quarry Siding railway station is a small railway station in Sundergarh district, Odisha. Its code is QRS. It serves Rourkela city as a secondary station. The station consists of two platforms. The platforms are not well sheltered. It lacks many facilities including water and sanitation. The station just 9 km from Rourkela city.

== Major trains ==
- Birmitrapur Barsuan Passenger
