= Bisra railway station =

Railway station in India

Bisra

General information
- Location: Bisra, Odisha; India
- Coordinates: 22°14′52″N 84°59′51″E
- System: Indian Railway Station
- Owner: Ministry of Railways, Indian Railways
- Line: Tatanagar–Bilaspur section
- Platforms: 2
- Tracks: 2

Construction
- Structure type: Standard (On Ground)
- Parking: No

Other information
- Status: Functioning
- Station code: BZR
- Zone(s): South Eastern Railway
- Division(s): Chakradharpur
Location
- Location within India Location within Odisha

Bisra railway station is a railway station on the South Eastern Railway network in the state of Odisha, India. It serves Bisra village. Its code is BZR. It has two platforms. Passenger, Express trains halt at Bisra railway station.

== Major Trains ==
- Samaleshwari Express
- Kalinga Utkal Express

== See also ==
- Sundergarh district
