= Shram Awards =

Indian national work recognition award

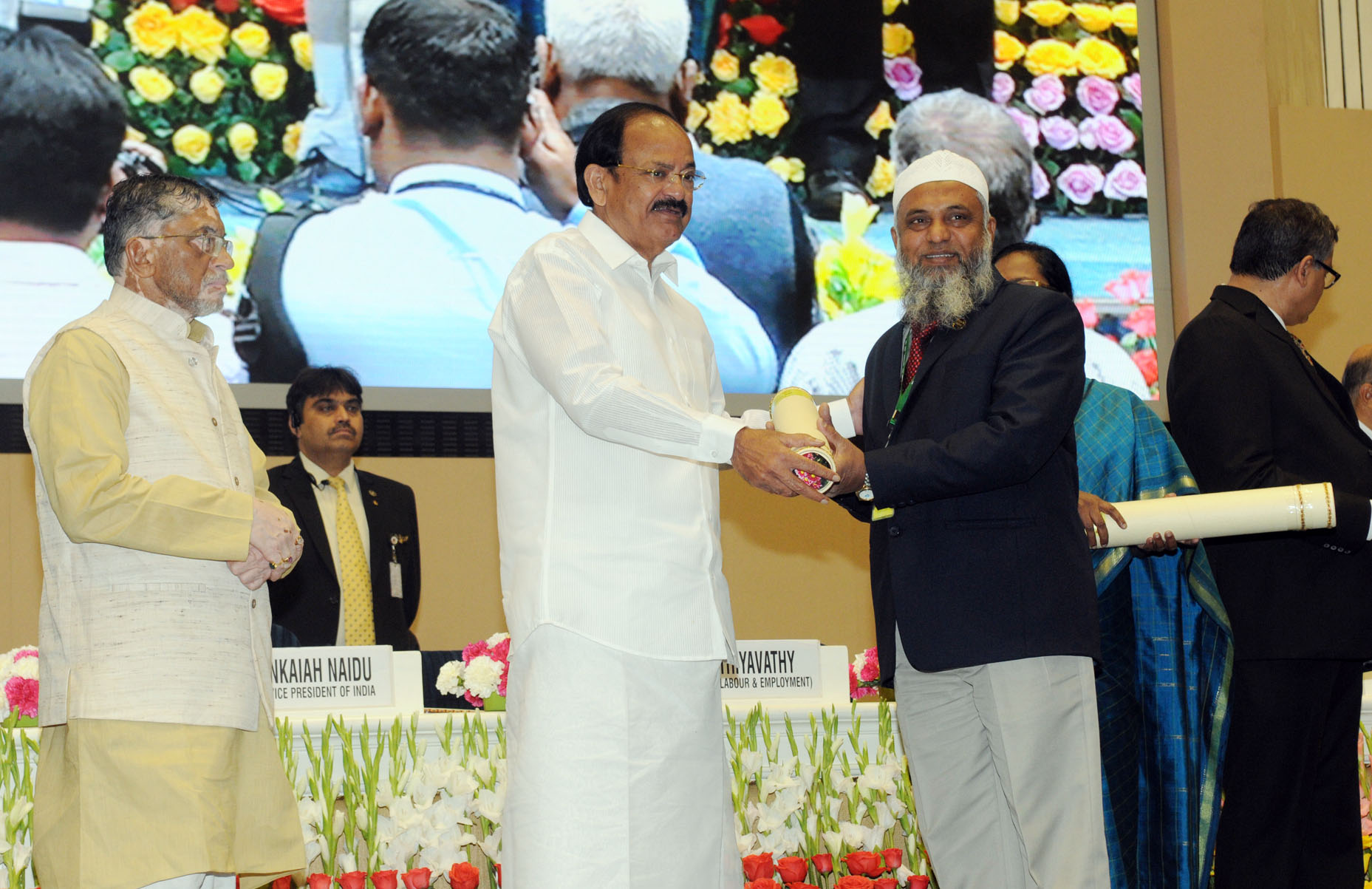
Vice President, Shri M. Venkaiah Naidu giving away the Prime Minister Shram Award in 2018.

The Prime Minister's Shram Awards were instituted in 1975 by the Government of India. This national award is conferred on workers for outstanding contributions that improve productivity, innovation, and indigenization, resulting in saving foreign exchange. The award is also given for long-term exceptional dedicated work.

They are four types of awards:

- Shram Ratna: Rs. Two lakhs and recognition of their contribution to their field (a Sanad).
- Shram Bhushan: RS. 100000 and a Sanad.
- Shram Vir / Shram Veerangana: RS. 60000 and a Sanad.
- Shram Devi / Shram Shree: RS. 40000 and a Sanad.

In 2013, eight people were nominated for the Shram Bhushan Award, 20 for the Shram Vir and 41 for the Shram Devi Award.
