= Rourkela Steel Plant =

Indian integrated steel plant

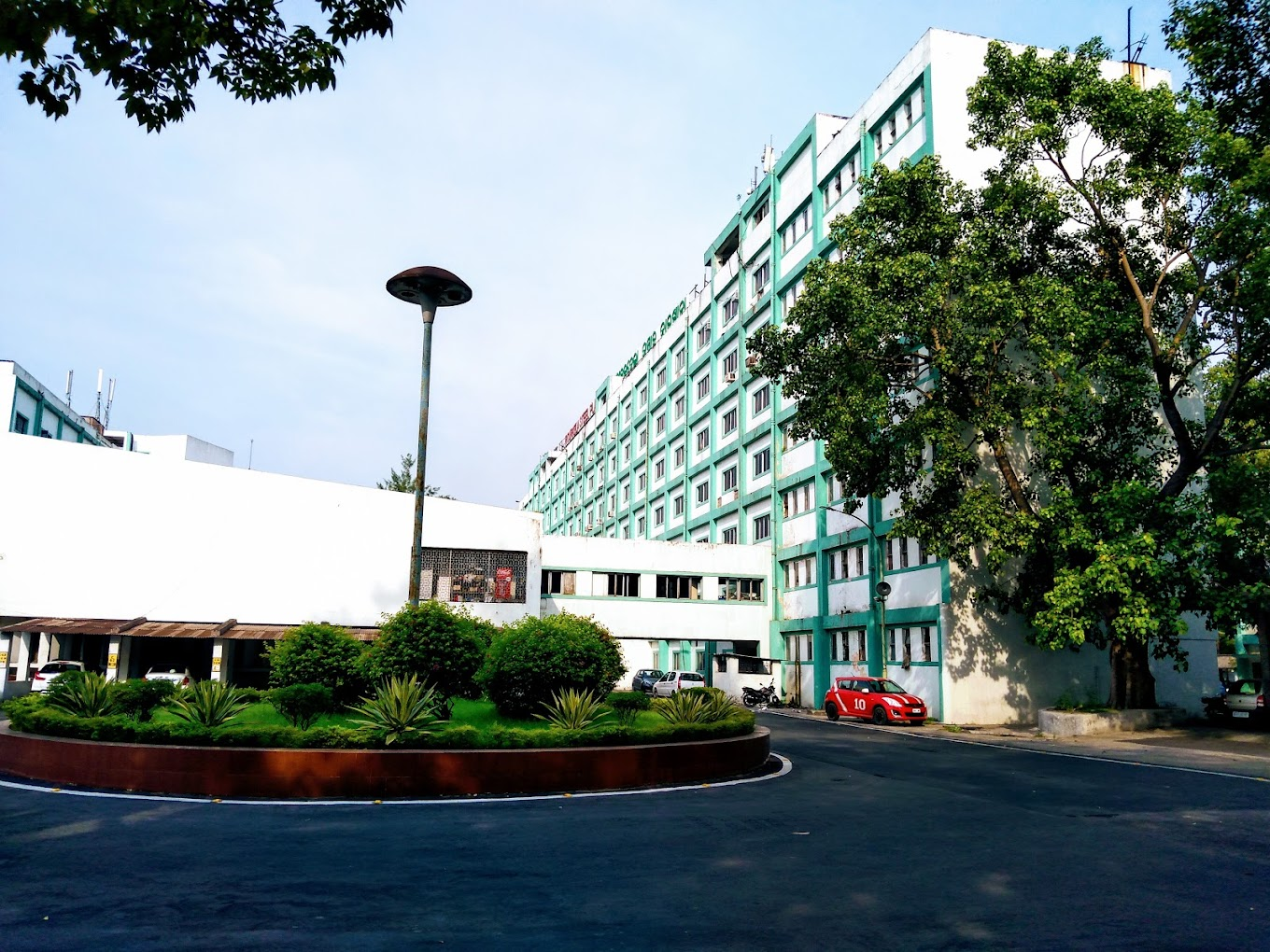
- Industry: Steel
- Founded: 3 February 1959; 67 years ago
- Headquarters: Rourkela, Odisha, India
- Key people: Alok Verma (Director in Charge)
- Products: Plate mill plates, HR plates, HR coils, ERW pipes, SW pipes, Silicon steel sheets and coils
- Revenue: ₹26,830.57 crores (US$3.54 billion) (2021-22)
- Owner: Government of India (Ministry of Steel)
- Number of employees: 19,134 (2011)
- Parent: Steel Authority of India Limited

Rourkela Steel Plant
- Location within Odisha
- Location: Rourkela
- Coordinates: 22.220870°N 84.860542°E
- Industry: Iron & Steel
- Owner: SAIL

Rourkela Steel Plant (RSP) is a public sector, integrated steel plant in Rourkela, Odisha state, India. It was established on 3 February 1959 with the help of West German industrial corporations on approximately 7,700 hectares (19,000 acres) of land acquired from tribal inhabitants. The plant is operated by the Steel Authority of India Limited (SAIL), a central PSU.

After the 2010-12 expansion, RSP currently has a production capacity of 4.5 MTPA (million tonnes per annum) of hot metal, 4.2 MTPA of crude steel, and 3.9 MTPA of saleable steel, employs 19,134 employees as of February 2011 and produces a mix of products. RSP reported an annual revenue of ₹26,830.57 crores (US$3.54 billion) and profit before taxes (PBT) of ₹6,347.65 crores (US$837.53 million) for the financial year 2021–22.

== History ==
=== A temple to modernization ===
The Rourkela Steel Plant Project was first announced by Jawaharlal Nehru in 1953. The steel plant at Rourkela was proposed in India's Second Five-Year Plan, drafted in 1954–55. RSP was projected as one of Nehru's temples to India's industrial modernity; aimed at rapid industrialization, removal of economic stagnation, generating employment and socioeconomic progress. The site of the plant at Rourkela was chosen for various reasons. One of the arguments is that in the 1950s, the government of Orissa was determined to attract investments for the establishment of industrial projects in the northern district of Sundargarh, which was considered to be one of the most backward regions with a mostly tribal population that desperately needed development. The decision was made for Rourkela due to technical and logistical reasons — raw materials such as iron ore, coal and limestone were locally available; water could be supplied from the Brahmani river; the Calcutta-Bombay railway line passed through Rourkela; and electricity could be supplied from the Hirakud dam.

=== Germans and Hindustan Steel ===
In the 1950s to 1960s, western governments like West Germany were keen on offering development aid to India, fearing that India might join the Soviet Union at some point and that this might encourage other third world countries to do the same, given Nehru's socialist rhetoric and his contacts with the Soviet Union. India also had strategic importance being a neighbor to communist China. In the early 1950s, West German businessmen and bureaucrats at the Ministry of Economics began emphasizing the potential in India's markets. Between 1950 and 1960 alone, India received more than 14% of all West German development aid.

Recognizing that foreign investment and technology was important for industrialization, the Indian government approached and negotiated with different companies such as the Krupp Company and Demag for the construction of a steel plant in the 1950s. In 1953, a deal was signed between the government of India and a Consortium of West German companies (Krupp, Demag, Gutehoffnungshütte (GHH), Mannesmann, Allgemeine Electricitals Gesellschaft (AEG) and Siemens) for the establishment of a Steel Plant in the Indian state of Orissa.

The Hindustan Steel Limited (HSL) was established as a public sector undertaking on 19 January 1954 to manage a steel plant to be set up in Rourkela. In March 1954, Krupp and Demag formed a separate company called the Indien Gemeinschaft Krupp Demag (IGKD), headquartered at Duisburg. The IGKD's purpose was to provide consultancy for the design and procurement of all plant equipment, to design the layout, to supervise erection and to commission India's first fully integrated steel plant. On 9 June 1954, the Board of Directors of HSL met in Delhi to give the go-ahead signal to IGKD for the construction of a steel plant in Rourkela. In 1956, an agreement was signed between the Indian government and Krupp's representatives, agreeing that Krupp would sell and ship all material required for the establishment of the Rourkela Steel Plant, with a production capacity of 1 MTPA of raw steel, and that Krupp would advise the HSL on the construction of the RSP. In exchange for the work and counsel, the Indian government would pay US$4.6 million to the companies.

=== Land acquisition ===
Even before the initial agreement for a steel plant in Rourkela had been signed, there was significant opposition to it from locals. In 1953, a Steel Plant Site People's Federation (SPSPF) had been formed to advocate for the villagers who opposed the plant. The first notifications of land acquisition for the steel plant and a new township were issued in 1954. The terms of land acquisition included monetary compensation for the land lost; the promise of a job in the regular RSP workforce for one able-bodied member from each household; provision of housing plots with subsidies in 3 resettlement colonies (Jalda, Jhirpani and later Bondamunda) in the periphery of the new township; and in addition to it, unbroken land for cultivation with an allowance for breaking it. To prepare Rourkela for an industrial complex, more than 30 villages were displaced and about 13,000-16,000 of their mostly Adivasi inhabitants forcibly resettled to acquire about 8,001 hectares (19,772 acres) of land in 1955. Later, parts of Bondamunda village were acquired for a marshalling yard of the steel plant. However, the compensations are said to have been inadequate, some displaced persons received nothing at all; the jobs promised were given years later, some were never given, and many had to survive on meager incomes from irregular casual labour.

=== Construction ===
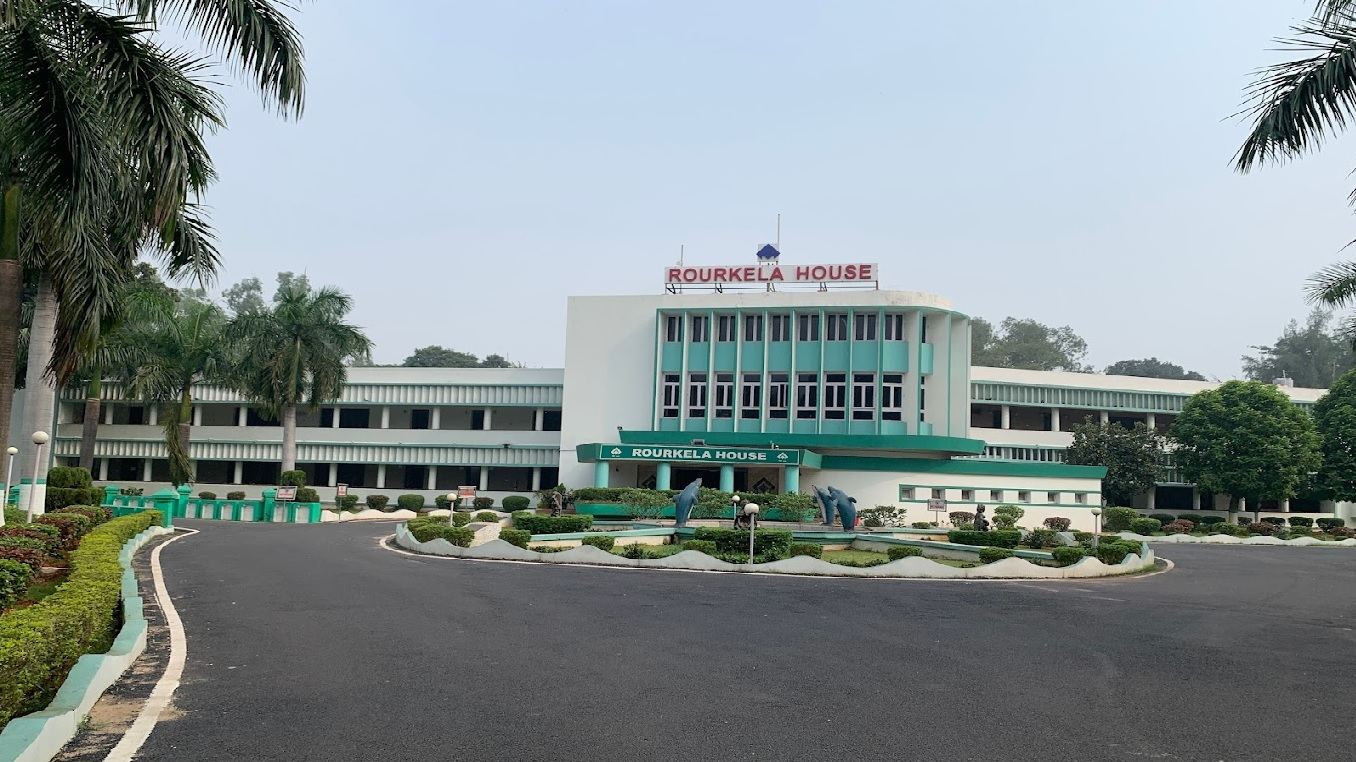
RSP's Rourkela House

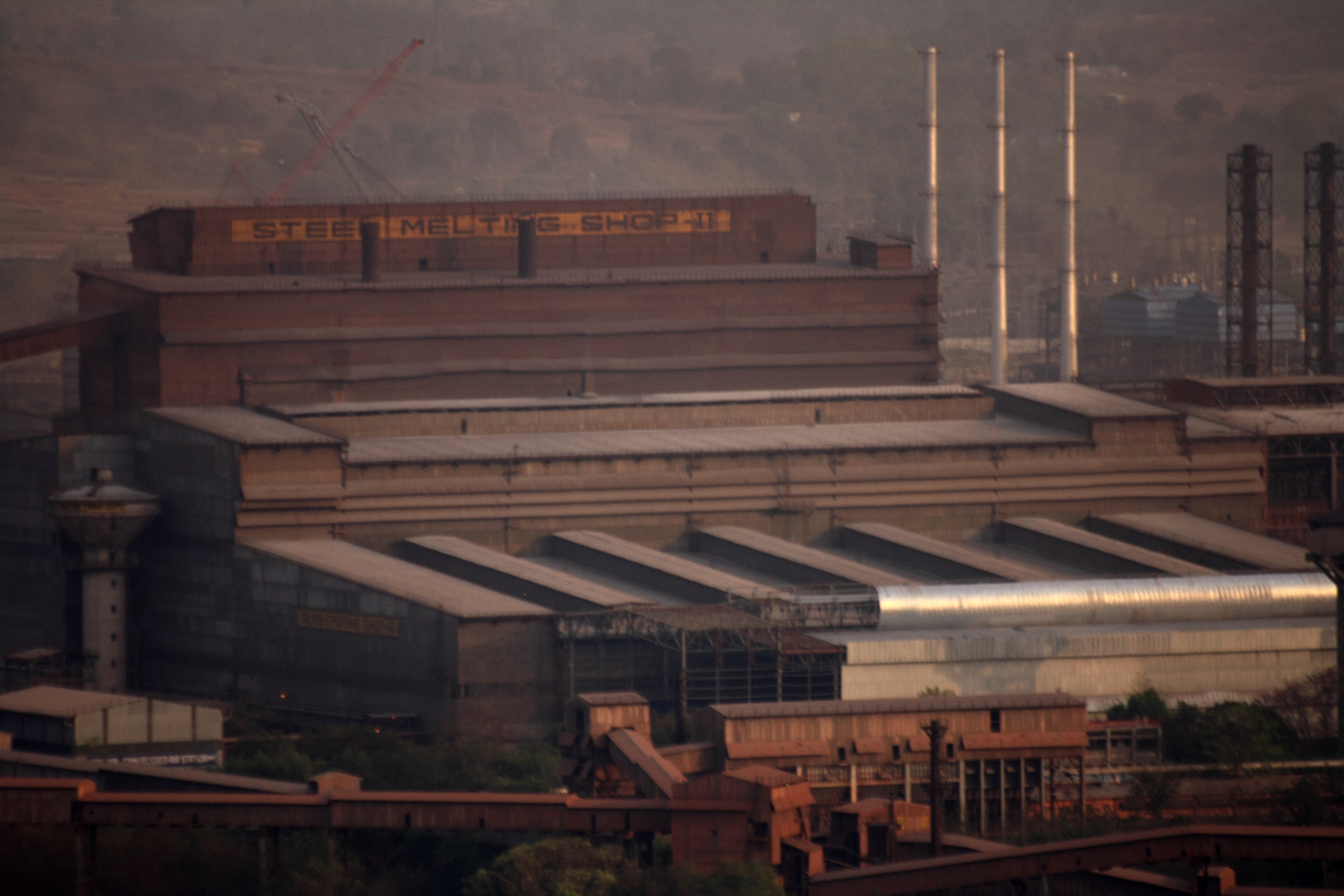
RSP's, Steel Melting Shop

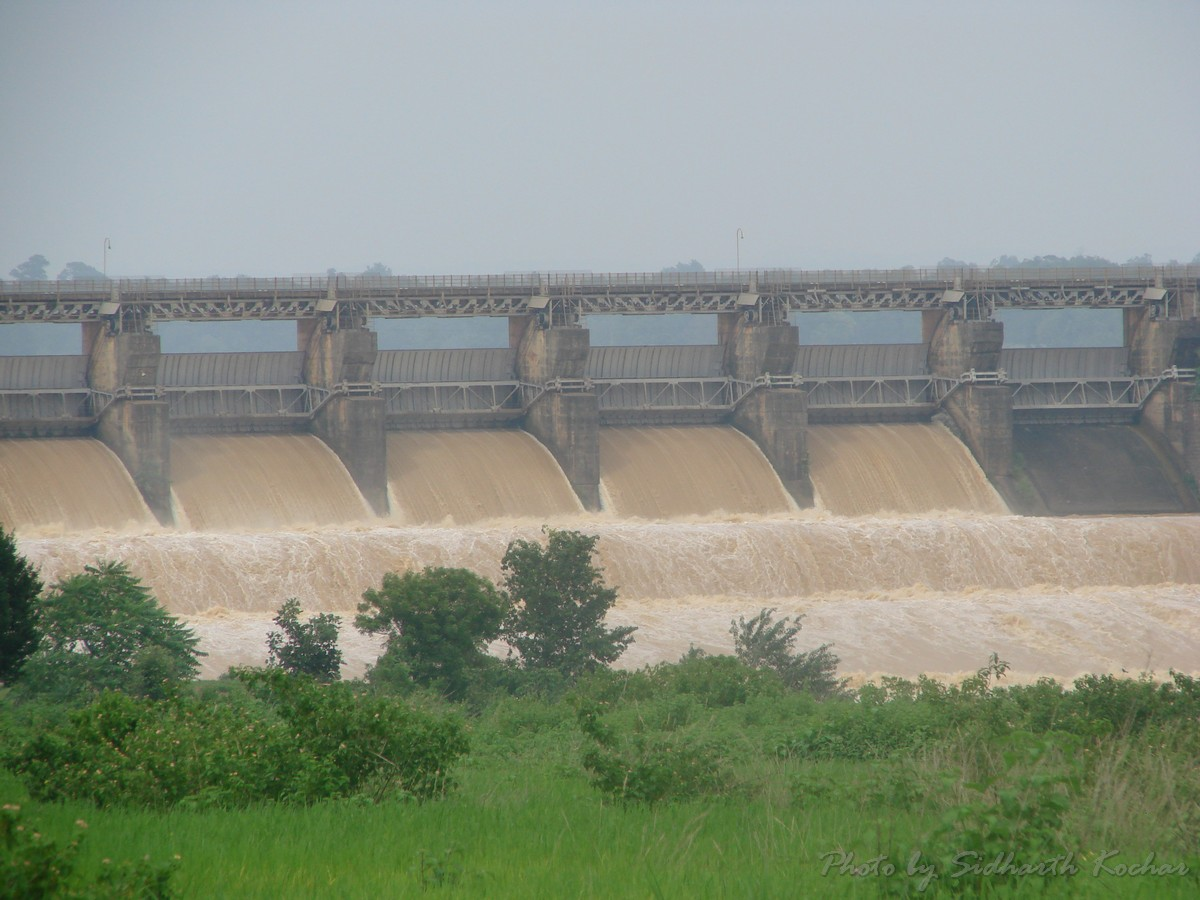
Mandira Dam

The construction of RSP began in 1956. The Germans realized that the task of building a steel plant in an underdeveloped area turned out to be more difficult than anticipated, due to insufficient logistics and slow transportation. In 1958, an agreement was made between the Consortium, the West German government and HSL to share the cost of sending West German experts to Rourkela and training Indian engineers in West Germany. Between 1957 and 1958, VÖEST, an Austrian company joined hands with Krupp for the construction of RSP, which became the first Linz-Donawitz (LD) steel plant to be located outside Austria.

=== Mandira Dam ===
To provide sufficient water supply for running the steel plant, the Mandira Dam Water Reservoir was constructed from 1957 to 1959 on the river Shankha, near Kansbahal. The first notifications for vacation of land for the dam site were issued in 1957. Jawaharlal Nehru had stayed at Rourkela to persuade villagers to give their lands and assured them that the displaced would be compensated. Jaipal Singh Munda came to Laikera village and conducted a meeting with the Adivasis, explaining them that the Dam will help develop RSP and the country; and that it will lead to an improvement in their quality of life. Jaipal also gave assurances that the displaced will be compensated with land and houses. The Mandira dam was set up on about 4,825 hectares (11,923 acres) of land acquired from 31 tribal villages, which were then submerged under water, and about 8,785 of their inhabitants were resettled. Testimonies of displaced persons indicate inhumane treatment during resettlement, inadequate compensation or in some cases, no compensation at all. Engineers from the Hirakud Dam Organization were brought to construct the Mandira dam. Construction began in February 1957 and was completed by June 1959.

Rourkela Steel Plant has an associated fertilizer plant that produces nitrogeneous fertilizers using ammonia feedstock (from its coke oven plant). On 3 February 1959, then president Rajendra Prasad inaugurated RSP's first blast furnace named 'Parvati' when the company was known as Hindustan Steel Limited (HSL). Subsequently, the RSP became a unit of the (SAIL).

The agreement was signed in Bonn, Germany by the Secretary of the Ministry of Production, on behalf of the Government of India, and two German firms of international repute, namely Krupp and Demag. The agreement provides for the technical and financial participation of these two firms in the construction of a new steel plant with an initial capacity of half a million tons of ingots, capable of expansion to one million tons.

The capital cost of the project is estimated to be about Rs. 71-25 crores at that time money. The share capital to be contributed by the German collaborators is expected to be of the order of Rs. 9.5 crores, the exact amount depending on the value of the plant that they may supply, and the balance of share capital will be found by the Government of India. It is proposed, however, to apply to the International Bank for Development and Reconstruction for a loan of about Rs. 20 crores towards the capital cost.

Recently, 12,000-crore rupees modernisation and expansion project was dedicated to the Nation by Prime minister Narendra Modi on 1 April 2015. With this RSP presently has the capacity to produce 4.5 million tonnes of hot metal, 4.2 million tonnes of crude steel and 3.9 million tonnes of saleable steel. The capacity of Rourkela Steel Plant (RSP) is expected to rise to 10.8 MTPA by 2025.

== Upgrade and modernization ==
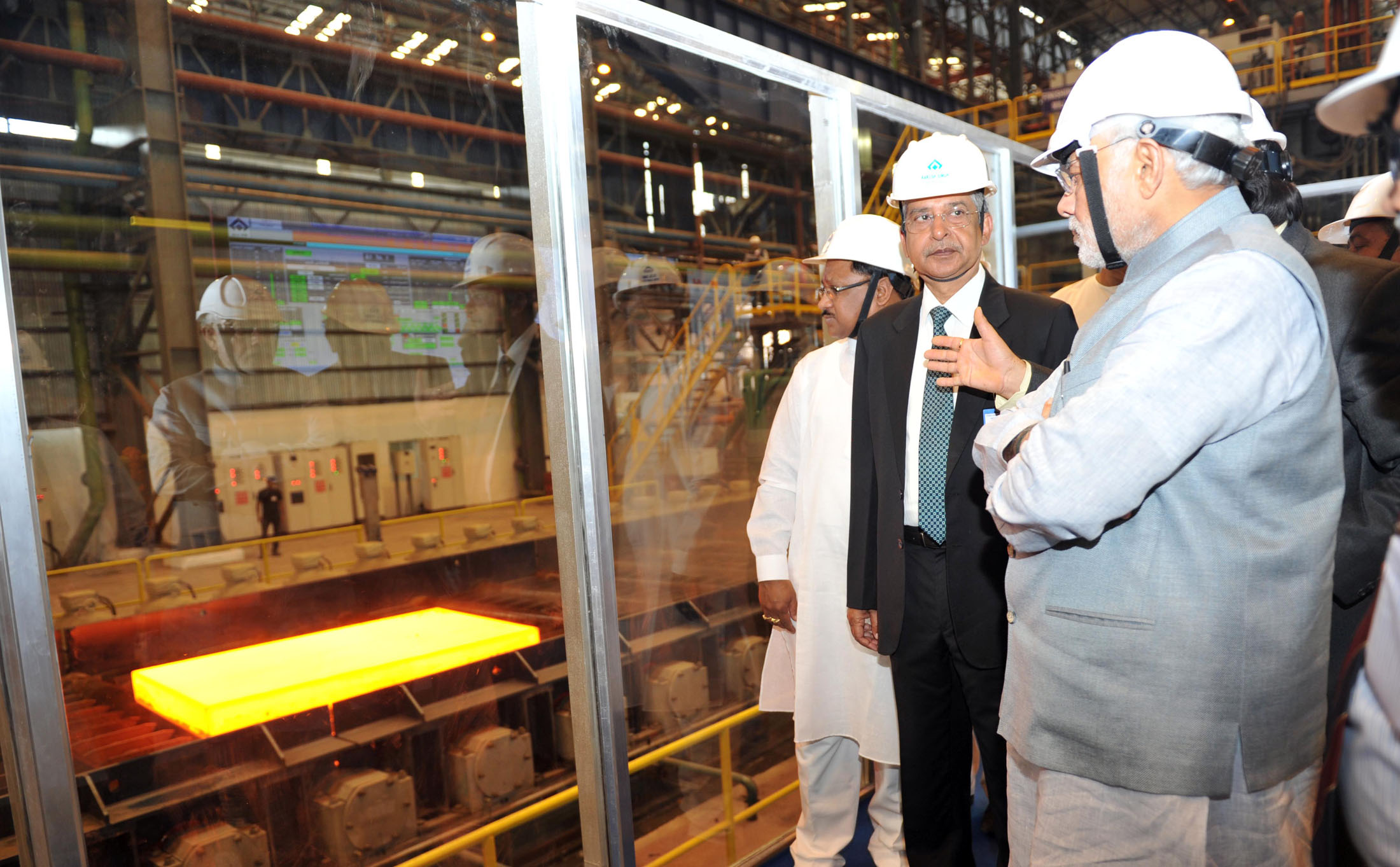
Prime Minister, Shri Narendra Modi visiting the Rourkela Steel Plant

The RSP has many firsts to its credit. It is the first plant in Asia to adopt the energy-efficient LD process of steel making and the first integrated steel plant of SAIL which adopted the cost-effective and quality centered continuous casting route to process 100% of steel produced. The plant has also, for the first time in India, had adopted external desulphurisation of hot metal by calcium carbide injection process. Subsequently, its steelmaking capacity was enhanced to 2 million tonnes and added many units to the facility. A pipe plant and special plate plant were set up during the 1970s for production of ERW pipes and steel plates for defense requirements. NSPCL, a joint venture company of NTPC Limited and SAIL, set up a captive power plant of 120 MW capacity to be self-sufficient. Rourkela Steel Plant undertook a modernization program in 1988 with an outlay of INR 4500 crores. This revamped the process of supply of raw materials, new oxygen plant, improved techniques in blast furnaces, selling of dolomite plant, cast house, slag granulation plant, supply of raw materials sintering plants and coal handling plants among others. Following the modernization RSP became the first SAIL plant to have adopted continuous casting route for all its hot metal production. It is also the first Indian steel plant to have adopted external desulfurisation of hot metal by the calcium carbide injection process.

Steel Authority of India plans to invest for its capacity expansion in its major plants. So Rourkela Steel Plant on modernization and expansion project on process.

- 1964: The Fertilizer Plant was set up in the year 1964 with a view to utilizing the residue of the steel plant and the re-utilization of the chemicals.
- 1970: Pipe Plant and Special Plate Plant was set up for production of pipes and steel plates for defense requirements.
- 1988: The modernization of RSP was begun for producing qualitative materials and establishing its importance in the world market.
- 1998: The modernization program with an outlay of INR 4500 crores.
- 2010: RSP-SAIL plans for its capacity expansion in its existing 2.2 MT to 4.5 MT of production.
- 2013: Rourkela Steel Plant unveiled the country's largest blast furnace named "DURGA" having a useful volume of 4060 cubic metres with a production capacity of 8000 tons hot metal per day, thus increasing its production capacity from 2.2 MT to 4.5 MT.
- 2015:Rourkela Steel Plant has set up 1 MW solar photovoltaic (PV) power generation unit inside the plant premises at a cost of Rs 6.68 crore, is expected to generate minimum 1.479 million units of solar energy per annum.

It is also installing other facilities for production of green energy. Two 5 KW rooftop solar PV power generation systems have already been installed and seven more such systems are in the pipeline. RSP is also in the process of setting up a 15 MW hydro power project on the downstream of Mandira Dam in collaboration with GEDCOL.

== Product mix ==
Its HR coils find application in manufacturing LPG cylinders, automobiles, railway wagon chassis and other high-strength type steels. It is SAIL's only plant that produces silicon steels for the power sector, high quality pipes for the oil and gas sector and tin plates for the packaging industry. Its wide and sophisticated product range includes flat, tubular and coated products. Special Plate Plant, Rourkela, is emerging as a major special steels centre for defence equipment. It produces armoured plate for the T-90 and Arjun (tank), and the BMP-2 infantry combat vehicle, which are built at Avadi and Medak respectively by the Ordnance Factory Board. Its annual capacity is 15,000 tonnes. The AB/A grade steel used in making India's first fully homemade Aircraft carrier INS Vikrant (2013) were produced in Rourkela Steel Plant.

=== Products ===
- Plate Mill plates
- HR plates and coils
- Defence grade plates
- ERW pipes
- SW pipes
- Electrical steel (CRNO)

== Achievements ==
- Two groups of employees received the coveted Vishwakarma Rashrtriya Puaraskar by the Ministry of Labour and Employment, Government of India.
- Four departments of RSP got certified with the prestigious ISO 50001:2018 EMS (energy management system) for the first time. The Certificate was awarded by Messers Bureau Veritas India, Limited (M/s BVIL), Kolkata.
- RSP received the ‘Gold award’ for ‘Internal Communication Campaign’ in the 14th Global Communication Conclave organised by Public Relations Council of India (PRCI) organised on 6 and 7 March at Bengaluru.
