= Home and Hope, Rourkela =

Indian disability rights organization

Coordinates: 22°15′19″N 84°51′21″E

Home and Hope, Rourkela (Hindi: होम एंड होप) is a non-profit organization that has been working to meet the needs and protect the interests and rights for disabled people.

The special school for the welfare of mentally disabled children provides boarding and lodging facility in the school, maintaining the children with care. The school works with 'Parents Association for the Welfare of the Mentally Retarded' (PAWMR), Rourkela.

The main objective of Home and Hope is the physical and socio-economic rehabilitation of physically disabled people, especially the resource-less, so they may lead a life of dignity and become productive members of the community. It also conducts scientific and technical research in developing and improving aids and appliances for physically disabled people. The home organizes workshops and seminars for dissemination of knowledge.

== Location ==
Home and Hope is in sector 17 in the city of Rourkela
