= Barsuan =

Barsuan Барсуан
- Village
- Location within Bashkortostan Location within Russia
- Coordinates: 54°37′N 55°06′E
- Country: Russia
- Region: Bashkortostan
- District: Blagovarsky District
- Time zone: UTC+5:00

Barsuan (Russian: Барсуан; Bashkir: Бәрҫеүән, Bärśewän) is a rural locality (a village) in Yamakayevsky Selsoviet, Blagovarsky District, Bashkortostan, Russia. The population was 146 as of 2010. There are 3 streets.

== Geography ==
Barsuan is located 19 km southeast of Yazykovo (the district's administrative centre) by road. Yamakay is the nearest rural locality.
