= Barsuan railway station =

Railway station in India

Barsuan

General information
- Location: Barsuan, Odisha; India
- Coordinates: 21°50′40″N 85°07′10″E
- System: Indian Railway Station
- Owner: Ministry of Railways, Indian Railways
- Line: Tatanagar–Bilaspur section
- Platforms: 1
- Tracks: 1

Construction
- Structure type: Standard (On Ground)
- Parking: No

Other information
- Status: Functioning
- Station code: BXF
- Zone(s): South Eastern Railway
- Division(s): Chakradharpur
Location
- Location within India Location within Odisha

Barsuan railway station is a railway station on the South Eastern Railway network in the state of Odisha, India. It serves Barsuan village. Its code is BXF. It has one platform. One Passenger train starts from Barsuan railway station.

== See also ==
- Sundergarh district
