= Sundergarh district =

Sundergarh district Sundargarh district
- District of Odisha
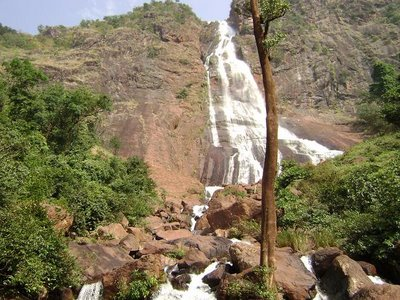
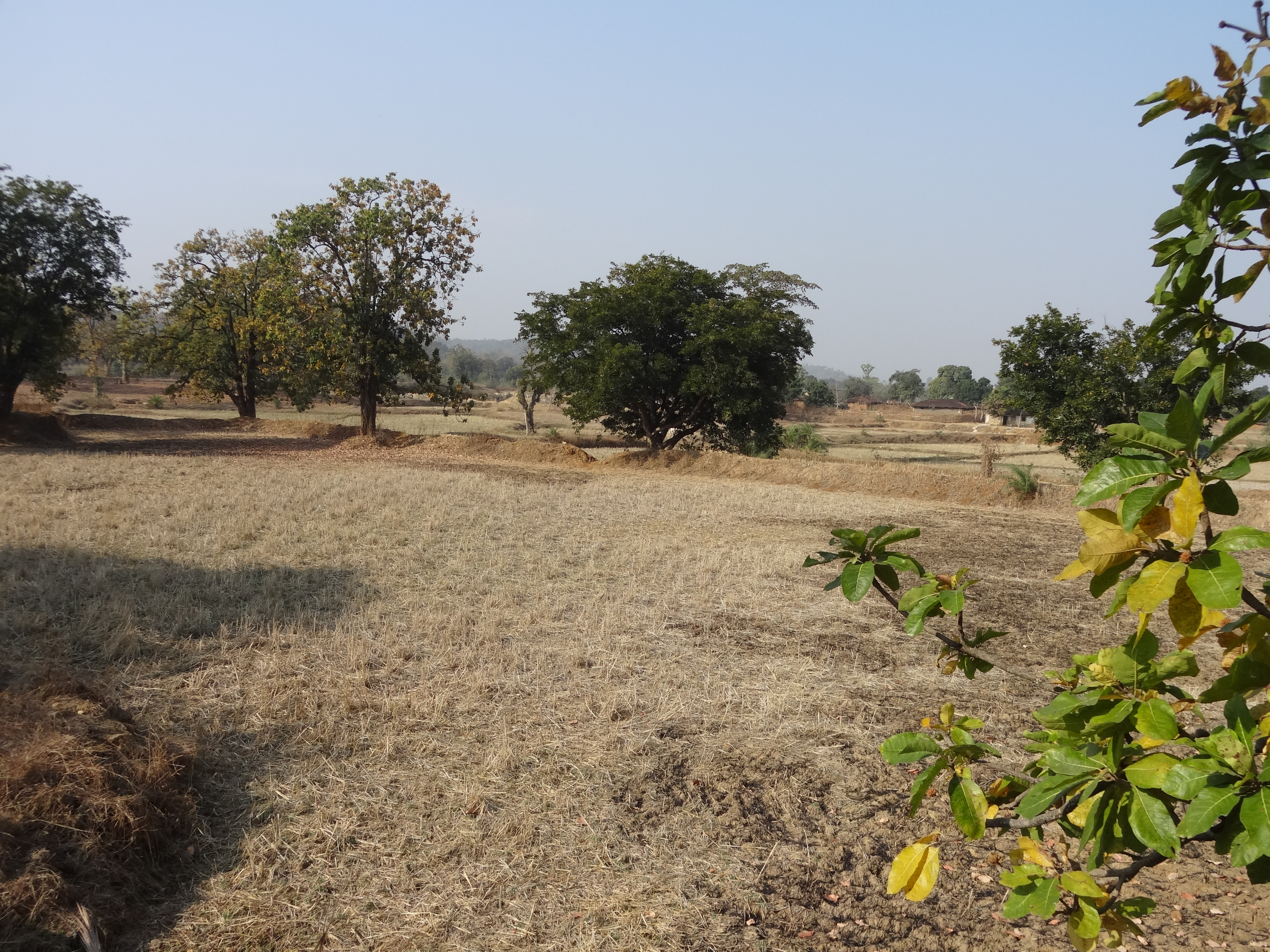
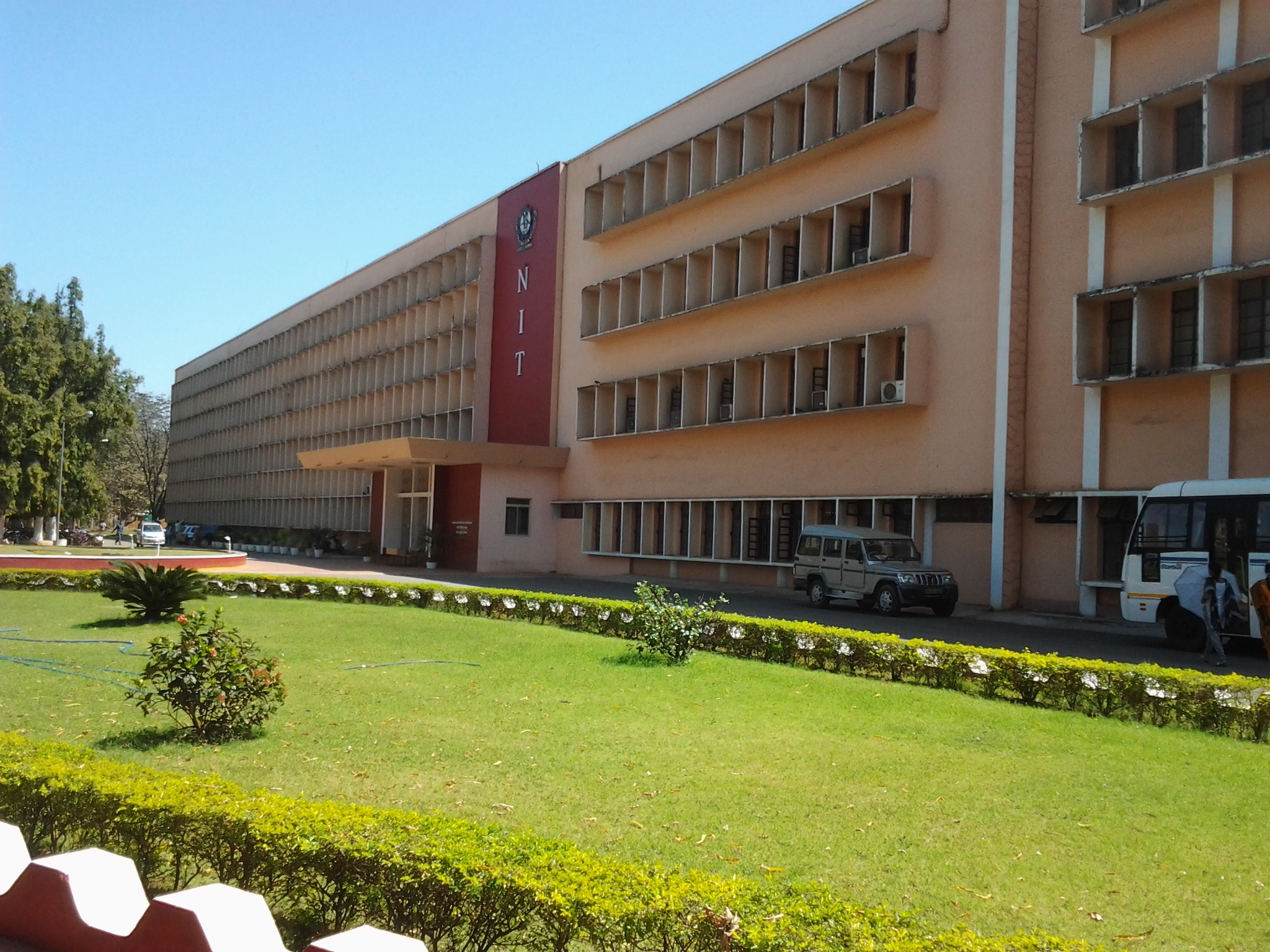
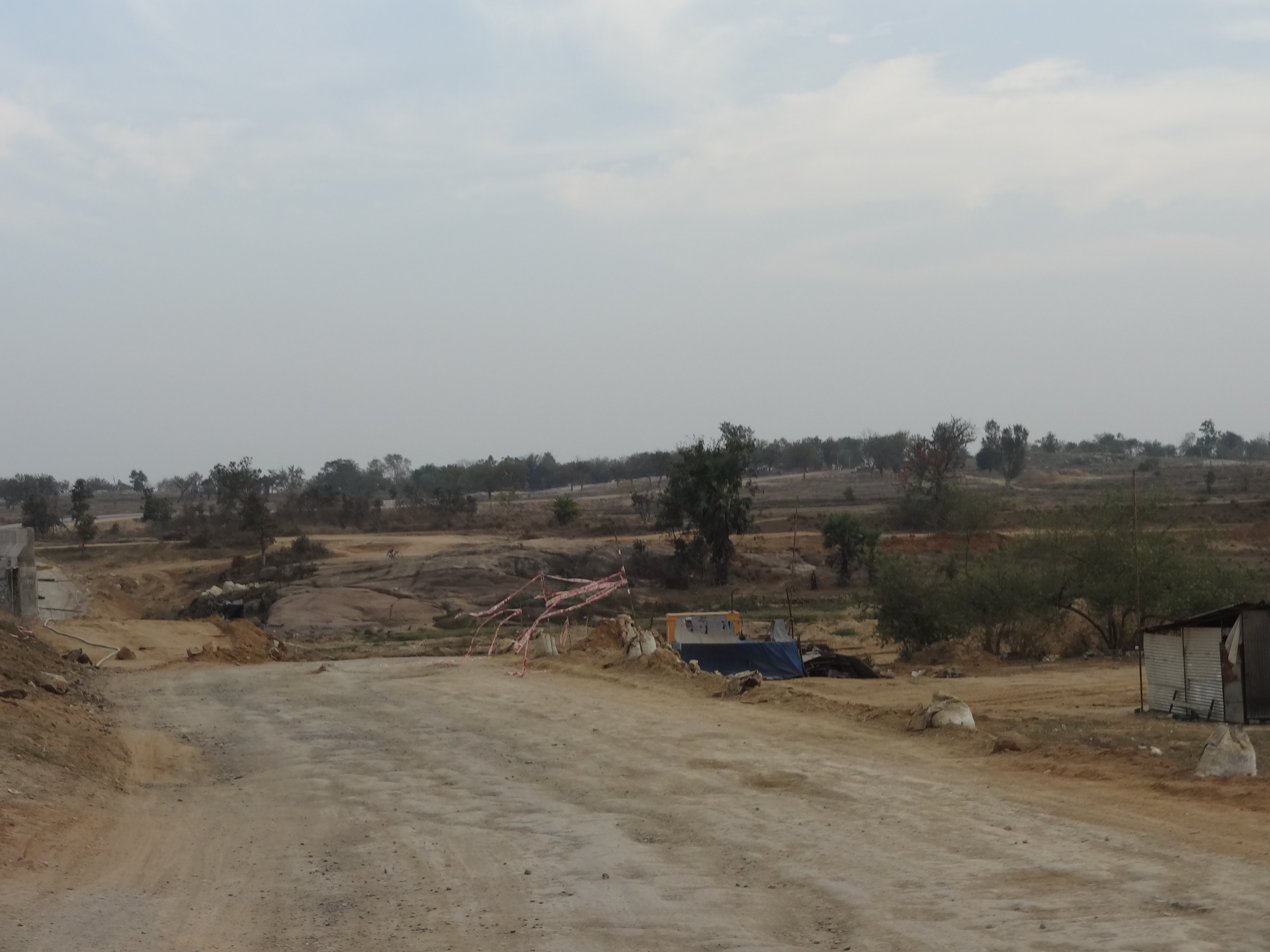
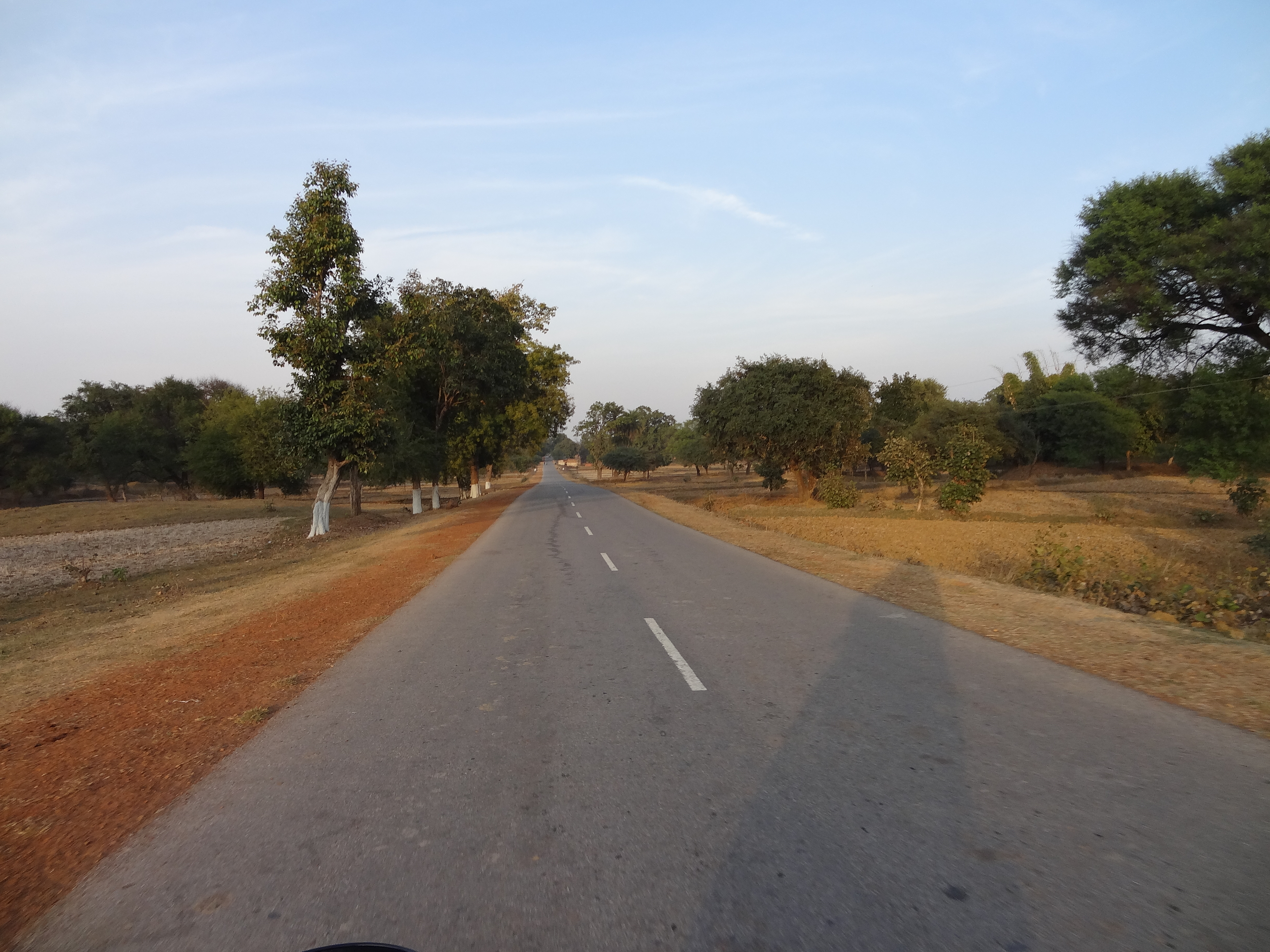
- Clockwise from top-left: Khandadhar Waterfall, Road in Tilia, Landscape near Tumulia, Dulavpur, NIT Rourkela

- Location in Odisha
- Coordinates: 22.116°N 84.016°E
- Country: India
- State: Odisha
- Division: Northern Division
- Headquarter: Sundargarh
- District subdivisions: Sundargarh; Panposh; Banei

Government
  - Member of Parliament: Jual Oram, (BJP)
  - Collector & District Magistrate: Manoj Satyawan Mahajan, IAS
  - Superintendent of Police: Pratyush Diwaker, IPS (Sundargarh Police district); Brijesh Rai, IPS (Rourkela Police district)

Area
  - Total: 9,712 km^{2} (3,750 sq mi)

Population (2011)
  - Total: 2,093,437
  - Density: 216/km^{2} (560/sq mi)

Languages
  - Official: Odia, English
  - Local: Sadri, Kurukh, Munda, Kharia
- Time zone: UTC+5:30 (IST)
- PIN: 769 xxx, 770 xxx
- Vehicle registration: OD-16, OD-14
- Literacy: 73.34%
- Lok Sabha constituency: Sundargarh(ST)
- Vidhan Sabha constituency: 7: 008-Talsara(ST) 009-Sundargarh(ST) 010-Biramitrapur(ST) 011-Raghunathpali(SC) 012-Rourkela 013-Rajgangpur(ST) 014-Bonai(ST)
- Climate: Aw (Köppen)
- Precipitation: 1,657.1 millimetres (65.24 in)
- Website: www.sundargarh.nic.in

Sundergarh district, also known as Sundargarh district, is a district in the northwestern part of Odisha state in eastern India.

Sundargarh district is bounded by Raigarh district of Chhattisgarh in the west, Jashpur district of Chhattisgarh in the North-West, Simdega district of Jharkhand in the North, West Singhbhum district of Jharkhand and Keonjhar district of Odisha in the east and Jharsuguda, Sambalpur, Deogarh and Angul districts of Odisha in the South. The town of Sundargarh is the district headquarters. Rourkela is the largest city in the entire district.

== Geography ==
The Sundargarh district forms the northwestern part of the Odisha state and is the second largest district in the state accounting for 6.23% of the total area. The geographical area of the district is 9,712 km^{2} (3,750 sq mi). The district spreads from 21°36′N to 22°32′N and from 83°32′E to 85°22′E.

== Demographics ==
Historical population
| Year | Pop. | ±% |
|---|---|---|
| 1901 | 277,173 | — |
| 1911 | 362,138 | +30.7% |
| 1921 | 377,449 | +4.2% |
| 1931 | 436,860 | +15.7% |
| 1941 | 490,708 | +12.3% |
| 1951 | 552,203 | +12.5% |
| 1961 | 758,617 | +37.4% |
| 1971 | 1,030,758 | +35.9% |
| 1981 | 1,337,871 | +29.8% |
| 1991 | 1,573,617 | +17.6% |
| 2001 | 1,830,673 | +16.3% |
| 2011 | 2,093,437 | +14.4% |
Source: Census of India

Religions in Sundergarh district (2011)
| Religion | Per cent |
| Hinduism | 73.20% |
| Christianity | 18.39% |
| ORP | 4.30% |
| Islam | 3.41% |
| Other or not stated | 0.70% |
*ORP mostly adherents of Sarnaism

According to the 2011 census Sundargarh district has a population of 2,093,437, roughly equal to the nation of North Macedonia or the US state of New Mexico. This gives it a ranking of 221st in India (out of a total of 640). The district has a population density of 214 inhabitants per square kilometre (550/sq mi). Its population growth rate over the decade 2001–2011 was 13.66%. Sundargarh has a sex ratio of 973 females for every 1000 males, and a literacy rate of 73.34%. 35.26% of the population lives in urban areas. Scheduled Castes and Scheduled Tribes make up 9.16% and 50.75% of the population respectively. The prominent tribes are Oraon (13.8 percent of district population), Munda (11.1%), Kisan (7%), Kharia (6.7%), Bhuiya (4.3%) and Gond (2.6%).

Languages of Sundergarh district (2011)
1. Odia (45.9%)
2. Sadri (14.8%)
3. Mundari (9.62%)
4. Hindi (6.98%)
5. Kurukh (5.57%)
6. Kisan (4.57%)
7. Kharia (4.38%)
8. Urdu (2.14%)
9. Bengali (1.52%)
10. Other (4.53%)

At the time of the 2011 Census of India, 43.85% of the population in the district spoke Odia,14.8% Sadri, 9.62% Mundari, 6.98% Hindi, 5.57% Kurukh, 4.57% Kisan, 4.38% Kharia, 2.14% Urdu and 1.52% Bengali as their first language.

== Economy ==
In 2006 the Ministry of Panchayati Raj named Sundargarh one of the country's 250 most backward districts (out of a total of 640). It is one of the 19 districts in Odisha currently receiving funds from the Backward Regions Grant Fund Programme (BRGF).

== Transport ==
=== Railways ===
The railway stations in Sundargarh district include Barsuan, Bimalgarh Junction, Birmitrapur Bisra, Bondamunda, Garpos, Jaraikela, Kalunga, Nuagaon, Quarry Siding, Rajgangpur and Rourkela Junction railway stations.

== Politics ==
=== Lok Sabha ===
Present Lok Sabha MP is Jual Oram who is representing the seat from 2014.

=== Vidhan Sabha Constituencies ===
The following is the list of 7 Vidhan Sabha constituencies of Sundargarh district and the elected members of that area

| No. | Constituency | Reservation | Extent of the Assembly Constituency (Blocks) | Member of 17th Assembly | Party |
|---|---|---|---|---|---|
| 8 | Talsara | ST | Subdega, Balisankara, Baragaon, Lephripara (part) | Bhabani Shankar Bhoi | BJP |
| 9 | Sundargarh | ST | Sundargarh (M), Sundargarh, Tangarpali, Hemgiri, Lephripara (part) | Jogesh Kumar Singh | BJD |
| 10 | Biramitrapur | ST | Biramitrapur (M), Kuarmunda, Nuagaon, Bisra (part) | Rohit Joseph Tirkey | BJD |
| 11 | Raghunathpali | SC | Rourkela (Township), Lathikata (part) | Durga Charan Tanti | BJP |
| 12 | Rourkela | None | Rourkela (M), Kulunga (O.G.), Bisra (part) | Sarada Prasad Nayak | BJD |
| 13 | Rajgangpur | ST | Rajgangpur (M), Rajgangpur, Kutra, Lathikata (part) | C. S. Raazen Ekka | INC |
| 14 | Bonai | ST | Gurundia, Bonaigarh, Lahunipara, Koira | Laxman Munda | CPI(M) |
