= List of urban local bodies in Odisha =

List of Urban local bodies of Indian state of Odisha

Odisha, a state on the eastern coast of India, is divided into 30 administrative geographical units called districts. Urban Local Bodies (ULBs) in Odisha, comprising Municipal Corporations, Municipalities, and NACs, are established under the Department of Housing & Urban Development, Government of Odisha. The 74th Amendment Act defined their formation & activities.

Odisha State Election Commission conducts elections for the post of Mayors, Corporators, Chairpersons & Councilors. The last election for ULBs were conducted in 2022.

== Urban local bodies ==
Odisha has 143 Urban Local Bodies. It has been classified into three categories

- Municipal Corporations or Mahānagara Nigama is the largest local body in the state. It is generally constituted around metropolitan city, which has a population of more than 100,000. Odisha has 6 municipal corporations
- Municipalities or Paura Parishada is formed around urban centre with more than 20,000 and less than 100,000 inhabitants. Generally, District headquarters and major town of the state. Odisha has 54 municipalities.
- Notified Area Councils or Bigyāpita Anchala Parishada is formed on settlements which have transitioned from rural to urban. An urban centre with more than 12,000 and less than 40,000 inhabitants is classified as an NAC. Odisha has 83 NACs.

== Recent Developments ==
On 5 July 2025, ahead of the Bahuda Yatra, Chief Minister Mohan Charan Majhi announced that Puri Municipality would be upgraded to a Municipal Corporation, thereby making it the sixth municipal corporation in Odisha.

On 16 August 2025, the Housing & Urban Development Department announced the formation of 12 new Notified Area Councils (NACs).

Subsequently, on 31 August 2025, during Swayat Shasan Divas, the Chief Minister announced the creation of 16 more NACs, the upgradation of seven NACs into municipalities, and reaffirmed the earlier decision to upgrade Puri to a Municipal Corporation bringing Odisha’s total to 28 new NACs, seven new municipalities, and one municipal corporation.

== Municipal Corporations in Odisha ==
There are currently 6 municipal corporations in Odisha managing a collective total of 288 urban wards.

No.	District	City	Corporation Name	Year of Formation	No. of Wards	Last Election	Mayor	Party
1	Khordha	Bhubaneswar	Bhubaneswar Municipal Corporation (BMC)	1994	67	2022	Sulochana Das	BJD
2	Kataka	Kataka	Kataka Municipal Corporation (KMC)	1994	59	2022	Subash Chandra Singh	BJD
3	Ganjam	Brahmapur	Brahmapur Municipal Corporation (BeMC)	2008	42	2022	Sanghamitra Dalei	BJD
4	Sambalpur	Sambalpur	Sambalpur Municipal Corporation (SMC)	2014	41	—	Vacant (Administered by Collector)	
5	Sundargarh	Rourkela	Rourkela Municipal Corporation (RMC)	2014	40	—	Vacant (Administered by Commissioner)	
6	Puri	Puri	Puri Municipal Corporation (PMC)	2026	39	—	Vacant (Administered by Collector)	

== Municipalities in Odisha ==
There are 54 municipalities in Odisha with 1062 Wards.

No.	District	City	No. of Wards	Chairperson	Party
1	Angul	Angul	23	Akshya Kumar Samanta	BJD
2	Angul	Talcher	21	Pabitra Bhutia	BJD
3	Balangir	Balangir	21	Lika Sahu	BJD
4	Balangir	Titlagarh	15	Mamata Debi Jain	BJP
5	Balasore	Balasore	31	Sabita Sahoo	BJD
6	Balasore	Jaleswar	17	Pratip Kumar Pradhan	BJD
7	Balasore	Soro	19	Madhab Dhada	BJP
8	Bargarh	Bargarh	19	Kalpana Majhi	BJD
9	Bhadrak	Basudevpur	23	Nibedita Behera	BJD
10	Bhadrak	Bhadrak	30	Gulmaki Dalwazi	Independent
11	Boudh	Boudh	(new)	Vacant	
12	Cuttack	Choudwar	19	Manasi Swarnaprava Samal	BJD
13	Deogarh	Deogarh	11	Santimanjari Dei	BJD
14	Dhenkanal	Dhenkanal	23	Jayanti Patra	BJP
15	Gajapati	Paralakhemundi	16	Nirmala Sethi	BJD
16	Ganjam	Aska	(new)	Vacant	
17	Ganjam	Bhanjanagar	(new)	Vacant	
18	Ganjam	Chatrapur	(new)	Vacant	
19	Ganjam	Hinjilicut	21	Subash Chandra Polai	BJD
20	Ganjam	Kabisuryanagar	(new)	Vacant	
21	Ganjam	Polasara	(new)	Vacant	
22	Jagatsinghpur	Jagatsinghpur	21	Archana Singh	INC
23	Jagatsinghpur	Paradeep	19	Basanta Biswal	BJD
24	Jajpur	Jajpur	18	Ranjulata Hota	BJD
25	Jajpur	Byasanagar	26	Sangita Pingua	BJD
26	Jharsuguda	Belpahar	19	Nimai Charan Panda	INC
27	Jharsuguda	Brajarajnagar	23	Jagayseni Oram	BJD
28	Jharsuguda	Jharsuguda	24	Rani Hati	BJD
29	Kalahandi	Bhawanipatna	20	Sanjukta Behera	BJD
30	Kandhamal	Phulbani	13	Smitarani Mohanty	BJP
31	Kendrapara	Kendrapara	21	Sarita Sahoo	BJD
32	Kendrapara	Pattamundai	20	Hemant Kumar Sahoo	BJD
33	Keonjhar	Anandapur	16	Rajanirani Khatua	BJD
34	Keonjhar	Barbil	15	Laxman Mahanta	BJD
35	Keonjhar	Joda	14	Jagadish Prasad Sahoo	BJD
36	Keonjhar	Keonjhar	21	Niku Sahoo	BJP
37	Khordha	Jatani	23	Ananta Behera	BJD
38	Khordha	Khordha	22	Kanaka Laxmi Mohanty	BJD
39	Koraput	Jeypore	28	Narendra Kumar Mohanty	INC
40	Koraput	Koraput	21	Lalat Ranjan Sethi	BJD
41	Koraput	Sunabeda	25	Rajendra Kumar Patra	Independent
42	Malkangiri	Malkangiri	19	Manoj Barik	BJD
43	Mayurbhanj	Baripada	28	Krushna Nanda Mohanty	BJD
44	Mayurbhanj	Karanjia	(new)	Vacant	
45	Mayurbhanj	Rairangpur	15	Abhishek Pattnaik	BJD
46	Nabarangpur	Nawarangpur	17	Kunu Nayak	BJP
47	Nabarangpur	Umerkote	14	Radha Bhatra	BJD
48	Nayagarh	Nayagarh	16	Nirupama Khatei	BJD
49	Rayagada	Gunupur	19	Mamata Gouda	Independent
50	Rayagada	Rayagada	24	Patnaikuni Mahesh Patnaik	BJD
51	Subarnapur	Sonepur	15	Tamasi Tamasmita Nayak	BJD
52	Sundergarh	Biramitrapur	11	Sandeep Mishra	BJD
53	Sundergarh	Rajgangpur	20	Madhuri Lugun	BJD
54	Sundergarh	Sundergarh	19	Tanaya Mishra	BJP

== Notified Area Council in Odisha ==
There are 83 NACs in Odisha. (Note: Wards and population values for the new NACs are not yet available.)

Sr. No.	District	NAC Name	Population	Wards	Chairperson	Party
1	Anugola	Anugola	12,298	11	Asha Kumari Sahoo	BJD
2	Anugola	Palalahada	—	(new)	Vacant	
3	Balangir	Kantabanji	21,819	16	Bariyam Singh Saluja	INC
4	Balangir	Loisingha	—	(new)	Vacant	
5	Balangir	Patnagad	21,024	15	Manasi Biswal	BJD
6	Balangir	Tusura	10,638	11	Ajaya Kumar Jaiswal	BJD
7	Baleshwar	Basta	—	(new)	Vacant	
8	Baleshwar	Nilagiri	17,264	13	Ambika Das	BJD
9	Baleshwar	Remuna	33,378	13	Tanuja Giri	BJD
10	Baleshwar	Simulia	—	(new)	Vacant	
11	Baragada	Attabira	17,243	12	Banamali Bariha	BJD
12	Baragada	Barpali	20,850	11	Dinesh Gahir	IND
13	Baragada	Bijepur	11,230	11	Sita Barik	BJD
14	Baragada	Padmapur	17,625	11	Sabitri Bag	BJD
15	Baragada	Sohela	—	(new)	Vacant	
16	Bhadrak	Chandabali	26,844	15	Santi Sethi	BJD
17	Bhadrak	Dhamnagar	22,920	11	Nibedita Jena	BJD
18	Bhadrak	Dhusuri	—	(new)	Vacant	
19	Bhadrak	Tihidi	—	(new)	Vacant	
20	Katak	Athagada	17,304	18	Sasmita Rout	BJD
21	Katak	Badamba	—	(new)	Vacant	
22	Katak	Banki	17,521	17	Manika Sahoo	BJD
23	Katak	Narasinghpur	—	(new)	Vacant	
24	Katak	Salepur	—	(new)	Vacant	
25	Dhenkanal	Bhuban	22,200	15	Suvendu Kumar Sahoo	BJD
26	Dhenkanal	Gondia	—	(new)	Vacant	
27	Dhenkanal	Hindol	17,387	16	Kesab Pradhan	BJD
28	Dhenkanal	Kamakshyanagar	16,810	15	Dharmananda Parida	BJD
29	Gajapati	Kashinagara	9,684	13	Mediboina Sudha Rani	BJD
30	Ganjam	Belaguntha	11,297	13	Phyroj Kumar Sethi	BJD
31	Ganjam	Buguda	15,176	13	Chitrasen Pradhan	BJD
32	Ganjam	Chikiti	11,645	12	Dipa Kumari Sahu	BJD
33	Ganjam	Digapahandi	13,190	11	Prafulla Panda	INC
34	Ganjam	Ganjam	11,747	12	Prativa Padhy	IND
35	Ganjam	Gopalpur	7,221	11	A Janaki Ram	BJD
36	Ganjam	Jagannathprasad	—	(new)	Vacant	
37	Ganjam	Khallikote	18,210	12	Niranjan Behera	BJD
38	Ganjam	Kodala	13,965	13	Surjya Narayan Nayak	BJP
39	Ganjam	Patrapur	—	(new)	Vacant	
40	Ganjam	Purushottampur	15,366	14	Priyanka Gouda	IND
41	Ganjam	Rambha	12,111	13	Manasi Swain	BJP
42	Ganjam	Sorada	14,867	11	Siba Sankar Panda	BJD
43	Jajpur	Chandikhol	—	(new)	Vacant	
44	Kalahandi	Dharmagada	16,585	14	Ashok Kumar Mohanty	BJP
45	Kalahandi	Jayapatana	—	(new)	Vacant	
46	Kalahandi	Junagada	19,656	12	Mukesh Agrawal	BJP
47	Kalahandi	Kesinga	19,239	12	Nruparaj Yadav	BJD
48	Kalahandi	Narla	—	(new)	Vacant	
49	Kandhamala	Baliguda	18,664	13	Gobinda Chandra Pradhan	BJD
50	Kandhamala	G. Udayagiri	11,302	13	Bhanuprava Mishra	BJD
51	Kendujhar	Champua	17,576	13	Girija Sankar Sahoo	BJD
52	Khordha	Tangi	—	12	Vacant	
53	Khordha	Banapur	17,278	15	Mitu Nayak	BJD
54	Khordha	Balugaon	17,645	11	Sukanti Paikaray	BJD
55	Koraput	Borigumma	—	(new)	Vacant	
56	Koraput	Kotpad	16,326	13	M. Shankar Rao	INC
57	Malkangiri	Balimela	11,796	12	Pradeep Kumar Nayak	BJP
58	Mayurbhanj	Bangriposi	—	(new)	Vacant	
59	Mayurbhanj	Betanati	—	(new)	Vacant	
60	Mayurbhanj	Chitrada	—	(new)	Vacant	
61	Mayurbhanj	Jashipur	—	(new)	Vacant	
62	Mayurbhanj	Kaptipada	—	(new)	Vacant	
63	Mayurbhanj	Rasagobindapur	—	(new)	Vacant	
64	Mayurbhanj	Udala	13,152	12	Pramila Panda	BJP
65	Nayagada	Dashapalla	18,470	16	Punam Priyadarshinee	IND
66	Nayagada	Khandapada	9,038	13	Arati Pradhan	IND
67	Nayagada	Odagaon	11,941	15	Vacant	—
68	Nayagada	Ranpur	14,809	15	Rangeen Mahanti	BJD
69	Nuapada	Khadial	15,087	13	Ujjwal Gupta	INC
70	Nuapada	Khadial Road	18,967	19	Sonia Jain	BJP
71	Nuapada	Nuapada	16,208	14	Mahammad Adam	IND
72	Puri	Konark	16,779	13	Sanjukta Tripathy	BJD
73	Puri	Nimapada	19,289	11	Sasmita Sahoo	BJD
74	Puri	Pipili	17,623	16	SK. Babu	BJD
75	Rayagada	Bissam Cuttack	—	(new)	Vacant	
76	Rayagada	Gudari	6,931	11	Sarimita Sabar	BJD
77	Sambalpur	Bamra	—	(new)	Vacant	
78	Sambalpur	Kuchinda	15,576	11	Pradyut Kumar Mohanty	BJD
79	Sambalpur	Redhakhol	15,379	13	Sibaram Sahoo	BJP
80	Sambalpur	Rengali	—	(new)	Vacant	
81	Subarnapur	Binika	15,765	12	Subash Chandra Bhue	BJD
82	Subarnapur	Birmaharajpur	—	(new)	Vacant	
83	Subarnapur	Tarbha	8,334	12	Bandita Nayak	BJD

== Overview (District Wise list) ==
No.	District	Municipal Corporation	Municipalities	NACs
1	Angul	NA	1. Angul; 2. Talcher	1. Athmallik; 2. Pallahara
2	Balangir	NA	1. Balangir; 2. Titlagarh	1. Kantabanji; 2. Loisinga; 3. Patnagarh; 4. Tusura
3	Balasore	NA	1. Balasore; 2. Jaleswar; 3. Soro	1. Basta; 2. Nilagiri; 3. Remuna; 4. Simulia
4	Bargarh	NA	1. Bargarh	1. Attabira; 2. Barapali; 3. Bijepur; 4. Padmapur; 5. Sohela
5	Bhadrak	NA	1. Basudevpur; 2. Bhadrak	1. Chandabali; 2. Dhamanagar; 3. Dhusuri; 4. Tihidi
6	Boudh	NA	1. Boudh	NA
7	Cuttack	Cuttack	1. Choudwar	1. Athagarh; 2. Badamba; 3. Banki; 4. Narsingapur; 5. Salepur
8	Deogarh	NA	1. Deogarh	NA
9	Dhenkanal	NA	1. Dhenkanal	1. Bhuban; 2. Gondia; 3. Hindol; 4. Kamakhyanagar
10	Gajapati	NA	1. Paralakhemundi	1. Kashinagar
11	Ganjam	Brahmapur	1. Aska; 2. Bhanjanagar; 3. Chhatrapur; 4. Hinjilicut; 5. Kabisuryanagar; 6. Polasara	1. Belaguntha; 2. Buguda; 3. Chikiti; 4. Digapahandi; 5. Ganjam; 6. Gopalpur; 7. Jagannatha Prasad; 8. Khallikote; 9. Kodala; 10. Patrapur; 11. Purusottampur; 12. Rambha; 13. Surada
12	Jagatsinghpur	NA	1. Jagatsinghpur; 2. Paradeep	NA
13	Jajpur	NA	1. Jajpur; 2. Byasanagar	1. Chandikhol
14	Jharsuguda	NA	1. Belpahar; 2. Brajarajnagar; 3. Jharsuguda	NA
15	Kalahandi	NA	1. Bhawanipatna	1. Dharamgarh; 2. Jaipatna; 3. Junagarh; 4. Kesinga; 5. Narla
16	Kandhamal	NA	1. Phulbani	1. Baliguda; 2. G. Udayagiri
17	Kendrapara	NA	1. Kendrapara; 2. Pattamundai	NA
18	Keonjhar	NA	1. Anandapur; 2. Barbil; 3. Joda; 4. Keonjhar	1. Champua
19	Khordha	Bhubaneswar	1. Jatani; 2. Khordha	1. Tangi; 2. Balugaon; 3. Banapur
20	Koraput	NA	1. Jeypur; 2. Koraput; 3. Sunabeda	1. Boriguma; 2. Kotpad
21	Malkangiri	NA	1. Malkangiri	1. Balimela
22	Mayurbhanj	NA	1. Baripada; 2. Karanjia; 3. Rairangpur	1. Bangriposi; 2. Betnoti; 3. Chitrada; 4. Jashipur; 5. Kaptipada; 6. Rasgobindpur; 7. Udala
23	Nabarangpur	NA	1. Nawarangpur; 2. Umerkot	NA
24	Nayagarh	NA	1. Nayagarh	1. Daspalla; 2. Khandapada; 3. Odagaon; 4. Ranpur
25	Nuapada	NA	1. Khariar Road	1. Khariar; 2. Sinapali; 3. Nuapada; 4. Komna
26	Puri	Puri		1. Konark; 2. Nimapada; 3. Pipili
27	Rayagada	NA	1. Gunupur; 2. Rayagada	1. Bissam Cuttack; 2. Gudari
28	Sambalpur	Sambalpur	NA	1. Bamra; 2. Kuchinda; 3. Redhakhol; 4. Rengali
29	Subarnapur	NA	1. Sonepur	1. Binka; 2. Birmaharajpur; 3. Tarbha
30	Sundergarh	Rourkela	1. Biramitrapur; 2. Rajgangpur; 3. Sundergarh	NA
