= Badadunguriguda =

- Village
- Location within Odisha Location within India
- Coordinates: 20.40°N 83.51°E
- Country: India
- State: Odisha
- District: Kalahandi

Government
  - Type: Panchayati Raj
- Elevation: 170 m (560 ft)

Population (2011)
  - Total: 1,231

Languages
  - Official: Odia

Language
  - Speaking: Koshali/Sambalpuri
- Time zone: UTC+5:30 (IST)
- PIN: 766031
- Telephone code: 06676
- Vehicle registration: OD-8/OR-8

Badadungiriguda is a village in Odisha, India. It is located in the Karlamunda block of the Kalahandi district. It comes under the administration of the Gajabahal gram panchayat.

The village is 83 km from Bhawanipatna, the district headquarters of Kalahandi, 50 km from Balangir, and 450 km from the state capital Bhubaneswar.

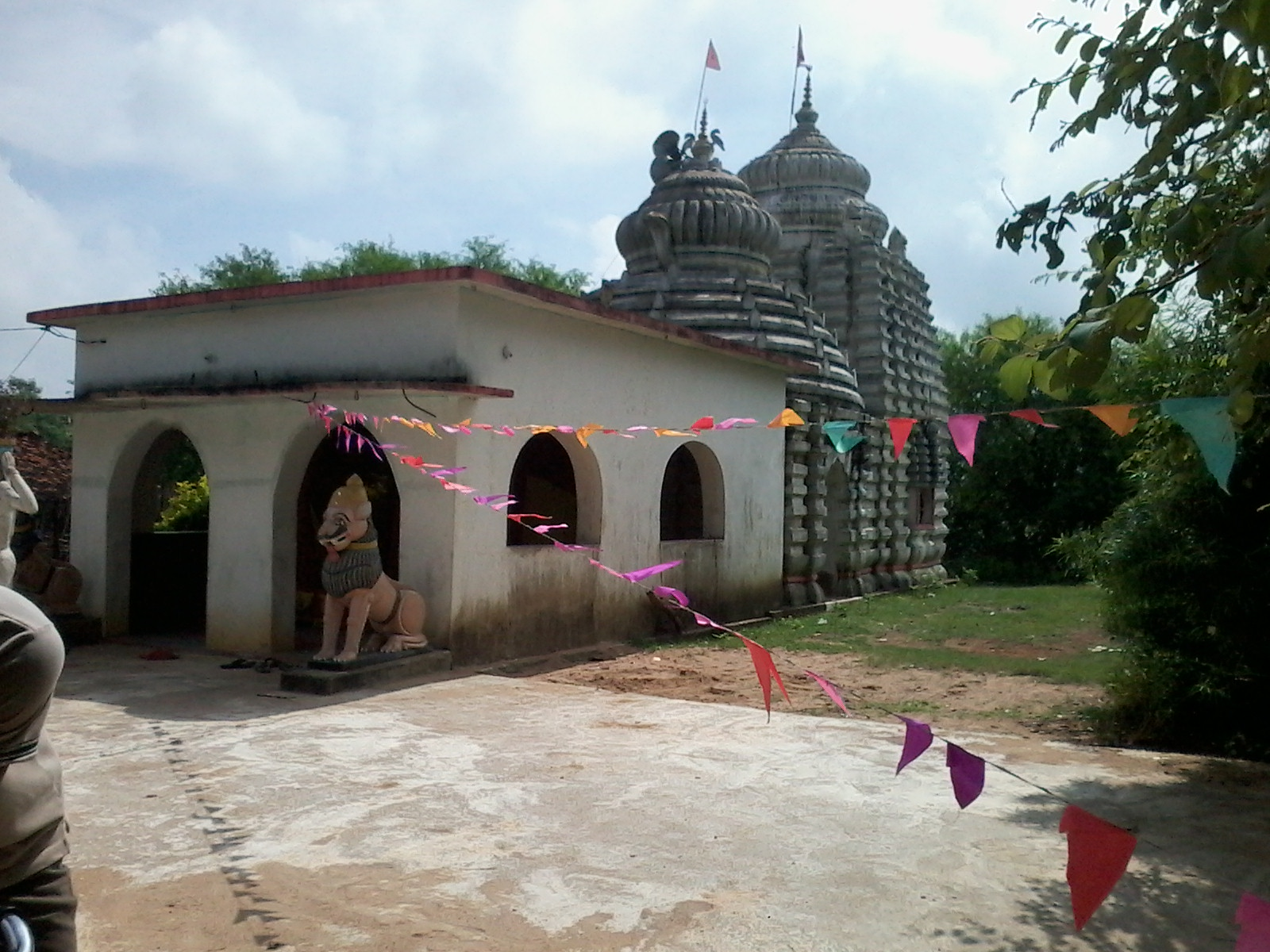
Shiva Temple

== Geography ==
Badadunguriguda is located at 20.40°N 83.51°E. It has an average elevation of 170 m (560 ft). The Bad Dunguri (Big hill) and Chita Dunguri (Leopard hill) are situated at the western part of Badadunguriguda.

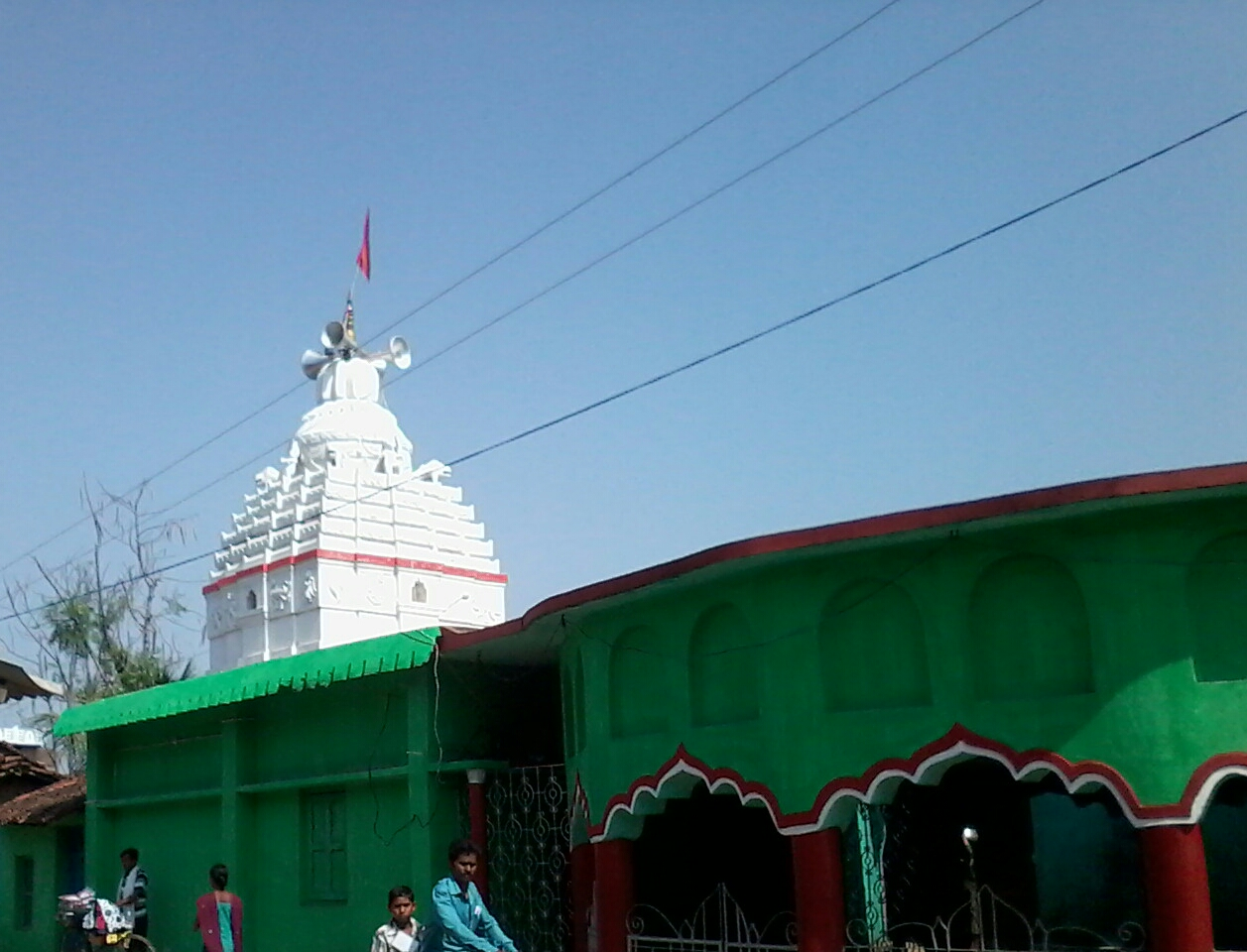
Ram Temple

== Demographics ==
As of 2011 Census of India, Badadunguriguda has a population of 1231 which 635 are male while 596 are female. Population of children with age of 0–6 is 151 which is 12.27% of total population of Badadunguriguda. Child sex ration for the Badadunguriguda as census is 936 lower than orissa state average of 941. Literacy rate of Badadunguriguda is 76.39% higher than state average of 72.87%.In Badadunguriguda male literacy stands at 85.64% while female literacy rate is 66.54%.In Badadunguriguda village out of total population 453 were engaged in work activities, 69.09% of workers describe their work as main work (Employment or Earning more than 6 months) while 30.91% were involved marginal activity providing livelihood for less than 6 months. Of 453 workers engaged in main work, 90 were cultivators (owner or co-owner) 105 were agricultural labour.

== Areas of Badadunguriguda ==
1. Basti of Badadunguriguda

2. Coloni Pada

3. Dangar Pada

4. Harijan Pada

== Transportation ==
Road: Badadunguriguda is well connected to district headquarters Bhawanipatna (83 km), Balangir (50 km) and Tusura (15 km) by road.

Train: Nearest railway station Balangir (50 km), Kesinga (40 km) Narla (60 km)

== Government organisations ==
- U.P School
- Anganwadi
