= Norla Road railway station =

Railway station in Odisha, India

Norla Road

General information
- Location: Norla Road, Odisha; India
- Coordinates: 20°02′27″N 83°22′25″E
- System: Indian Railways station
- Owner: Ministry of Railways, Indian Railways
- Line: Jharsuguda–Vizianagaram line
- Platforms: 2
- Tracks: 2

Construction
- Structure type: Standard (on ground)
- Parking: No

Other information
- Status: Functioning
- Station code: NRLR
- Zone(s): East Coast Railway
- Division(s): Sambalpur
Location
- Location within India Location within Odisha

Norla Road railway station is a railway station on the East Coast Railway network in the state of Odisha, India. It serves Norla town. Its code is NRLR. It has two platforms. Passenger, Express trains halt at Norla Road railway station.

== Major trains ==
- Korba–Visakhapatnam Express
- Puri–Ahmedabad Express
- Samata Express
- Bilaspur–Tirupati Express
- Dhanbad–Alappuzha Express
- Sambalpur–Rayagada Intercity Express
- Samaleshwari Express

== See also ==
- Kalahandi district
