= Adikanda Mahanta =

Indian folklorist

- ଆଦିକନ୍ଦ ମହାନ୍ତ
- Born: 8 May 1954; Chitrada, Mayurbhanj, Orissa, India
- Died: 13 January 2015 (aged 60); Chitrada, Mayurbhanj, Orissa, India
- Occupation(s): Folklorist, researcher, educator
- Spouse: Subhadra Mohanta
- Children: 2

Adikanda Mahanta (Odia: ଆଦିକନ୍ଦ ମହାନ୍ତ; born 8 May 1954, Chitrada - 13 January 2015) was an Indian folklorist from Chitrada, Odisha. He is one of the pioneer folklorists of Odisha and is well known for his research on folk culture of eastern India.

== Biography ==
Mahanta was born in Chitrada, Mayurbhanj, Orissa, India to Shri Shiva Prasad and Satyabhama Mohanta. He stood First Class Honours in the Oriya Masters program at Ranchi University. He then earned his PhD in the folk culture of Orissa. He successfully defended his thesis "Odishara Kurmali Lokagita" (Kudmali/Kurmali Folk Songs of Orissa) in 1988 at the same university.

Mohanta was a Sub-Inspector of Schools for the Government of Orissa and worked with Basanta Kishore Sahoo and founder Manindra Mohanty for the organisation Research Institute for Oriya Children's Literature. Mahanta has two 2008 textbooks that were added to state curricula by the Government of Orissa in the 2009-2010 academic year: Odisha ra srasta adibasi loka katha, Part 1 and Itihasaru sikshiba aasa. In Orissa, Mahanta was known for his contributions towards children's literature. Additionally, he served as editor-in-chief for the folklore journals Pharua (1998-2002), Kudmi Katha (1995-2008), and Bandana.

== Awards and honours ==
- 1985: Bisubamilana Sisu Sahittika Sammana - Prajatantra Prachar Samiti
- 1986: Kanakadurga Motimahal Gadaradanga Puri Award
- 1987: Kendujhar Jillastariya Sisu Sahitya Sansad Award
- 1987: Sisu Sahittika Award - Kuwantara Bhubaneswar
- 1988: Rasachhanda Kendujhar Award
- 1998: Sri Sri Jagannath Tatwasrom Udaybatu Jagatsingpur Award
- 1998: Agami Satabdi Bhubaneswar Jhumar Gabesaka Award
- 1999: Mayurbhanj Banipitha Haldipada Award
- 2000: Mayurbhanj Jilastariya Sebaka Samiti Award
- 2001: Saraswata Baniputra Award
- 2001: Purulia Paschimbanga Lokasahitya Award
- 2005: Rajyastrariya Kruti Sikhaka Award
- 2008: Rajat Jayanti Prabandhika Award - Mayurbhanj Sahitya Parishad
- 2010: Kalingaratna Samman Award

== Selected publications ==
- 1985: Uttar Odishara Loka katha
- 1988: Gapa suniba aasa
- 1991: Satirtha galpa
- 1993: Gyana tapaswi radhakrusnan
- 1997: Odisha ra srestha adivasi loka katha
- 1998: Tiring ringa
- 1999: Kudmi loka katha
- 2002: Karam katha
- 2003: "Folk Treatment System of Tribal Society in Eastern India" (pages 62–65) in Changing Tribal Life: A Socio-philosophical Perspective by Padmaja Sen ISBN 978-81-8069-023-5
- 2005: Kudmi janma sanskara
- 2006: Kurmali loka katha o laka gita: Samanya kathana
- 2006: Jhumar samikhya
- 2006: Chheng gargar khapra pitha
- 2007: Kudmi biplabi neta
- 2007: Chau Nrutya samanya kathana
- 2007: Mayurbhanja ra lokabadya
- 2007: Kudmi jati eka bihangabalokana
- 2007: "Ecological Ideologies in Tribal Folklore of Eastern India" (pages 71–77) in Forest, Government, and Tribe by Chittaranjan Kumar Paty ISBN 978-81-8069-406-6
- 2008: Utara Odisha ra loka nrutya
- 2015: Uttar Odishar Adivasi O Mulabasinka Lokasanskruti Har Mitaan
- 2023: Atmajibani Sikh + Oak = Shikhyak
