= Dayanidhi =

Dayanidhi or Dhayanidhi is an Indian name. Notable people with these names include:

== Given name ==
- Dayanidhi Azhagiri, Indian Tamil cinema producer and distributor
- Dayanidhi Maran (born 1966), Indian politician
- Dayanidhi Paramahansa Dev (1905–1992), Indian sadguru, yogi, mystic and a Hindu spiritual leader
- Dhayanidhi Sk (born 2003), founder of Makkal Raja Group, established in 2017.

== Surname ==
- Santhosh Dhayanidhi, Indian film composer and singer
