= Barabatia, Bhadrak =

Barabatia
- village
- Country: India
- State: Odisha
- District: Bhadrak
- Block: Tihidi
- Gram Panchayat: Harisinghpur Gram Panchayat

Government
  - Type: Panchayati Raj
  - Body: Harisinghpur Gram Panchayat

Barabatia is a village in Bhadrak district, Odisha. Barabatia comes under the Tihidi block and governed locally under the panchayata raj system with the panchayat headed by a sarpanch. The village comes under the Harisinghpur Panchayat. Being a rural area the traditional culture, festival and heritage have flourished here.

== Etymology ==
The name comes from an odian name which is the combination of two odian words: bara(ବାର), which means twelve, and bati(ବାଟି), which means 20 acres.

== Geography ==
The place is located in tihidi block of Bhadrak District, Odisha. Barabatia comes under the pirahat RI circle. The village's geography is suited for agriculture.

== Demographics ==
As of the 2011 census there were a total of 216 families residing in Barabatia. Barabatia has a population of 1155, of which 571 are males and 584 are females.

The population of children ages 0–6 is 117, making up 10.13% of the village's total population. Batabatia's average sex ratio is 1023, which is higher than the Orissa state average of 979. Child Sex Ratio for the Barabatia as per census is 696, lower than Orissa average of 941.

Barabatia has a higher literacy rate than Orissa. In 2011, the literacy rate of Barabatia was 83.72% compared to Orissa's 72.87%. In Barabatia male literacy stands at 89.44%, while the female literacy rate is 78.36%.

Schedule Caste (SC) constitutes 3.38% of the total population of Barabatia. The village currently doesn't have any Schedule Tribe (ST) population.

== Government and politics ==
Barabatia village is under the Harisinghpur Gram Panchayat which is the local government in panchayati Raj system. Ayodhya Rani Jena was the sarpanch of the Panchayat who won the 2017 panchayat election. In 2022 panchayat election Ajay Mohanty won election for sarpanch candidate and became the new sarpanch and Dhiren Sahoo elected as panchayat samiti member for the panchayat which comes under the Tihidi Panchayat Samiti. Barabatia comes under the Chandabali Vidhansabha constituency of Odisha legislative assembly and current MLA is Byomkesh Ray of BJD. Loksabha constituency is Bhadrak and current MP is Manjulata Mandala of BJD.

== Economy ==
In Barabatia village out of total population, 310 were engaged in work activities. 76.77% of workers describe their work as Main Work (Employment or Earning more than 6 Months) while 23.23% were involved in Marginal activity providing livelihood for less than 6 months. Of 310 workers engaged in Main Work, 53 were cultivators (owner or co-owner) while 112 were Agricultural labourer. Pirahat is the largest market in the locality. Most of the people depend upon it.

== Transportation ==
Barabatia is 31 km away from Bhadrak town. The state highway no9 is passes through the village. One can reach Barabatia from Bhadrak by this way.

== Education ==
There is two schools in the village. One primary school is Barabatia U.G.U.P. school and one High school is BNVP High school. Nearest college to the village is Tihidi College, Ghanteswar degree College etc.

== Culture ==
The place has rich culture and heritage of Hinduism. Place is famous for Durga Puja in the locality. Other Hindu festivals like Kali puja, Diwali, Rath Yatra, Ganesh puja, Saraswati Puja are also observed by people. There is a Maa Durga temple, Maa kali temple and a Jagannath temple is present in the village. A Gandhi statue is present in kali padia in the village which is the emblem of the freedom fighter of the area.

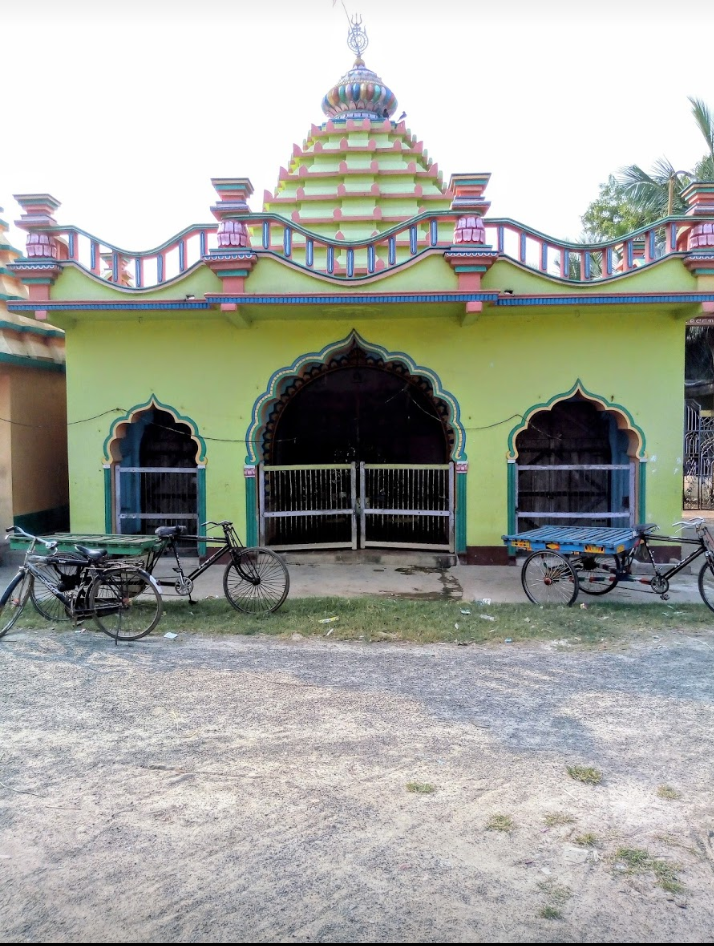
Kali Temple in Kali Padia

== See also ==
Tihidi
