= Chaitanya Prasad Majhi =

Politician from Odisha (1929–2019)

Cabinet minister for ST & SC Development & Minorities & Backward Classes Welfare Government of Odisha
- In office 2006–2009
- Preceded by: Kalindi Behera
- Succeeded by: Bijay Ranjan Singh Bariha

Cabinet minister for Higher Education Government of Odisha
- In office 1990–1995
- Preceded by: Sk. Matlub Ali
- Succeeded by: Bhagabat Prasad Mohanty

Deputy Minister for Petroleum and Chemicals Government of India
- In office 1974–1975
- Prime Minister: Indira Gandhi
- Preceded by: Chaudhary Dalbir Singh
- Succeeded by: Ziaur Rahman Ansari

Deputy Minister for Chemicals and Fertilizers Government of India
- In office 1975–1977
- Prime Minister: Indira Gandhi

Member of Odisha Legislative Assembly
- In office 2004–2009
- Preceded by: Purusottam Naik
- Succeeded by: Sarojini Hembram
- Constituency: Bangriposi
- In office 1986–1995
- Preceded by: Bhabendra Nath Murmu
- Succeeded by: Laxman Majhi
- Constituency: Rairangpur

Member of Parliament, Rajya Sabha
- In office 1972–1978
- Constituency: Orissa

Personal details
- Born: November 19, 1929 Mayurbhanj, Odisha
- Died: January 18, 2019 (aged 89)
- Party: BJD (1997 Onwards)
- Other political affiliations: JD (1990-1997); JNP (1986-1990); INC (R) (before 1977)
- Spouse: Damayanti Majhi
- Children: 5 Daughters including Sarojini Hembram
- Parent: Lakshman Majhi (father)
- Education: B.Sc

Chaitanya Prasad Majhi (19 November 1929 - 28 January 2019) is an Indian politician from Odisha. He was born in Bangriposi. He was Deputy Minister for Petroleum and Chemicals in Indira Gandhi ministry. He was the higher education minister in the Biju Patnaik ministry and ST & SC Development & Minorities & Backward Classes Welfare in the Naveen Patnaik Ministry. He died on 28 January 2019 in bhubaneswar following brief illness.

== Position Held ==
- Member of Rajya Sabha from Orissa as INC(R) candidate from 1972 to 1978
- Deputy Minister for Petroleum and Chemicals in Indira Gandhi ministry from 1974 to 1975
- Deputy Minister for Chemicals and Fertilizers in Indira Gandhi ministry from 1975 to 1977
- Member of the Odisha Public Service Commission from 1979 to 1985
- MLA from Rairangpur in 9th Odisha Legislative Assembly as Janata Party candidate from 1986 to 1990
- MLA from Rairangpur in 10th Odisha Legislative Assembly as Janata Dal candidate from 1990 to 1995
- Cabinet minister for Higher Education in Biju Patnaik ministry from 1990 to 1995
- Member of Academic Council of North Orissa University from 1998 to 2000
- MLA from Bangriposi in 13th Odisha Legislative Assembly as BJD candidate from 2004 to 2009
- Cabinet minister for ST & SC Development & Minorities & Backward Classes Welfare in Naveen Patnaik ministry from 2006 to 2009
- Published book on tribal language and culture
- Member of All India Tribal Literary Fourm, New Delhi
