= Sarojini Hembram =

Indian politician (born 1959)

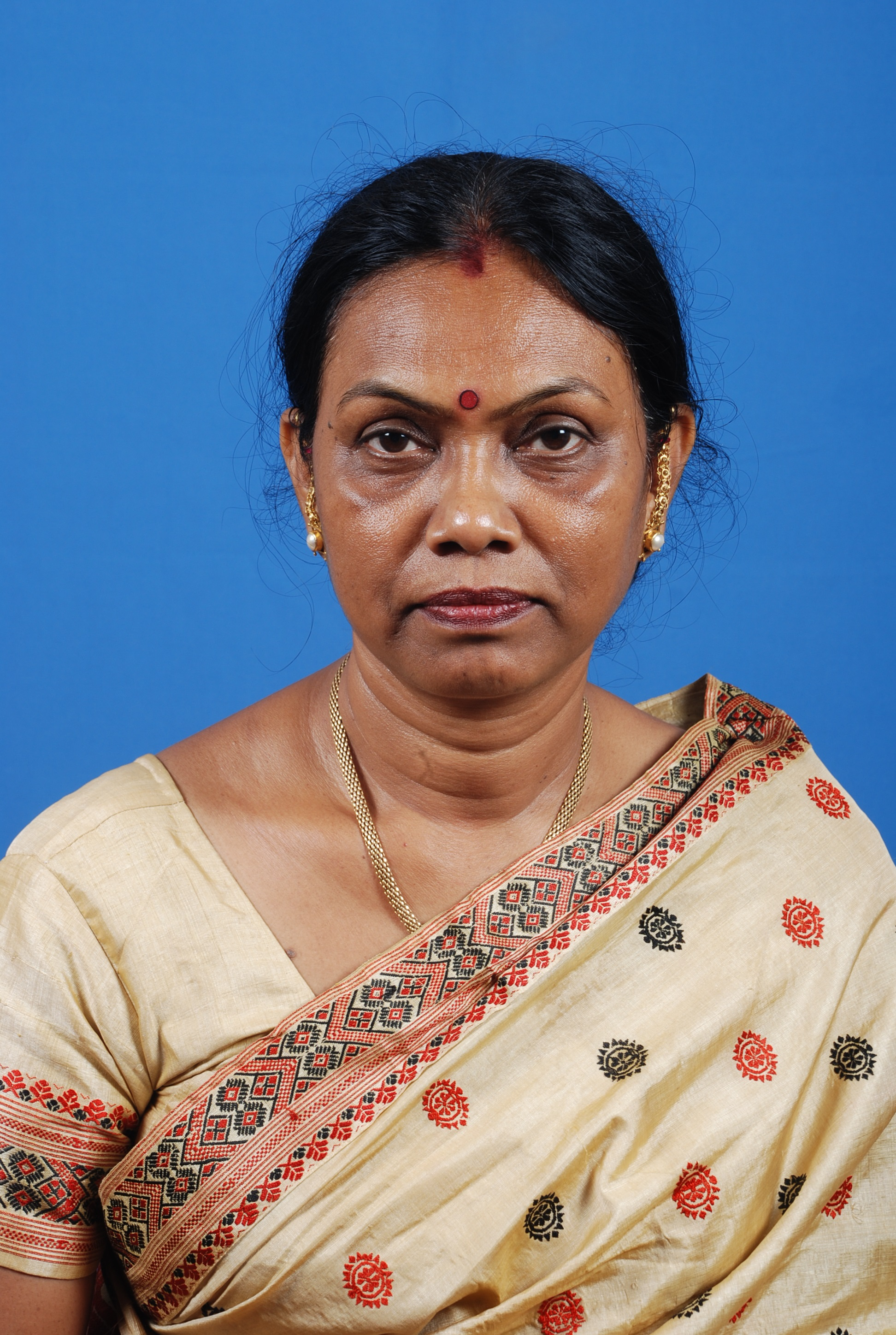

Member of Parliament Rajya Sabha
- In office 3 April 2014 – 2 April 2020
- Succeeded by: Sujeet Kumar
- Constituency: Odisha

Personal details
- Born: 1 October 1959 (age 67) Rairangpur, Mayurbhanj Orissa
- Party: Biju Janata Dal
- Spouse: Bhagirathi Naik
- Parent: Chaitanya Prasad Majhi (father)
- As of 9 December, 2014

Sarojini Hembram (1 October 1959) is an Indian politician from the Odisha state. She belongs to the Biju Janata Dal (BJD) party. She was elected to the Odisha Legislative Assembly from Bangriposi (Odisha Vidhan Sabha constituency) in 2009 and became the minister for textile, handlooms and handicrafts in the Odisha Government. She was elected to the Rajya Sabha the Upper house of Indian Parliament in 2014 from Odisha.

== Biography ==
Sarojini Hembram was born in Rairangpur town, Mayurbhanj, Odisha. She is the daughter of Chaitanya Prashad Majhi and Shrimati Damayanti Majhi. She did her postgraduate (master's degree in music) at Utkal Sangeet Mahavidyalaya, Bhubaneswar and previously, educated at K.N.G. High School, Baripayttuuuyda. Her husband Shri Bhagirathi Nayak is a social service person. In 1990–99, Sarojini Hembram was a lecturer in Music in Jayadev College of Education and Technology, Naharkanta, Bhubaneswar. She is proficient in Santali, Hindi, English, Odia and Bengali languages. In 1996, She served as a Representative for the District Welfare Department, Mayurbhanj. In 2006, She was appointed as a Member of Policy Holders' Council, Life Insurance Corporation of India, Divisional Office, Cuttack. She was also appointed as the Member of Programme Advisory Committee, State Resource Centre (Adult Education), Orissa. She is known for her Vocal folk singer/artist in All India Radio, Cuttack and Doordarshan since 1983. Being an artist, she participated in many cultural programmes relating to tribal culture. She has also performed as an artist, playback singer, actress, and production controller.

== Political career ==
In 2008, elected as the Vice-President, Biju Janata Dal (B.J.D.), Mayurbhanj. She served this post for one year. In the next year 2009 just before Odisha Legislative Assembly election, her name was declared as an Assembly contestant. She quit the government job in 2009 to join politics and was elected to the Odisha Assembly from Bangriposi assembly constituency unseating three-time MLA JMM heavy weight Sudam Marandi.

- In 2010, She became a member of Tribal Advisory Council, House Committees on Women & Child Welfare, Environment and Pollution and Sub-Committee on Amenities of Members in Odisha Legislative Assembly. Also, she served as a member of State Level High Power Vigilance & Monitoring Committee (ST/SC) and the Standing Committee on Health in Odisha Legislative Assembly. She became Vice-President of Bharat Scouts and Guides, Odisha.
- In 2011, She became a member of the State Level Selection Committee- Panchayati Raj Department, Government of Odisha.
- From 2012 to 2014 she serves as the Minister of State (Independent Charge), Department of Textiles, Handloom and Handicraft in Government of Odisha.
- In 2014, she was elected to Rajya Sabha. In July 2014, she became a member of All India Institute of Medical Sciences (AIIMS), Bhubaneswar and in Sept 2014, member of Committee on Social Justice and Empowerment.
- From May 2015- April 2016, she served in as a Member of Committee on the Welfare of Scheduled Castes and Scheduled Tribes.
- In 2018, she became a Member of Committee on Government Assurances.

In Winter session 2019, she raised first time her locality issue in the Rajya Sabha Parliamentary House through her Mother tongue Santali language and marked a history towards endangering minority language.

== See also ==
- Bangriposi
