= Bangriposi =

- Town
- Location in Odisha, India Bangriposi (India)
- Coordinates: 22°10′0″N 86°32′0″E
- Country: India
- State: Odisha
- District: Mayurbhanj
- Established: 22.12.2025

Government
  - Type: NAC
- Demonym: Bangriposia

Languages
  - Official: Odia, English
- Time zone: UTC+5:30 (IST)
- Postal code: 757032
- Vehicle registration: OD 11
- Nearest city: Baripada
- Website: odisha.gov.in

Bangriposi also known as Bangiriposi, Bangriposhi is a town and a block HQ in Mayurbhanj district, Odisha, India. H&UD department of Govt of Odisha has declared it as an NAC.

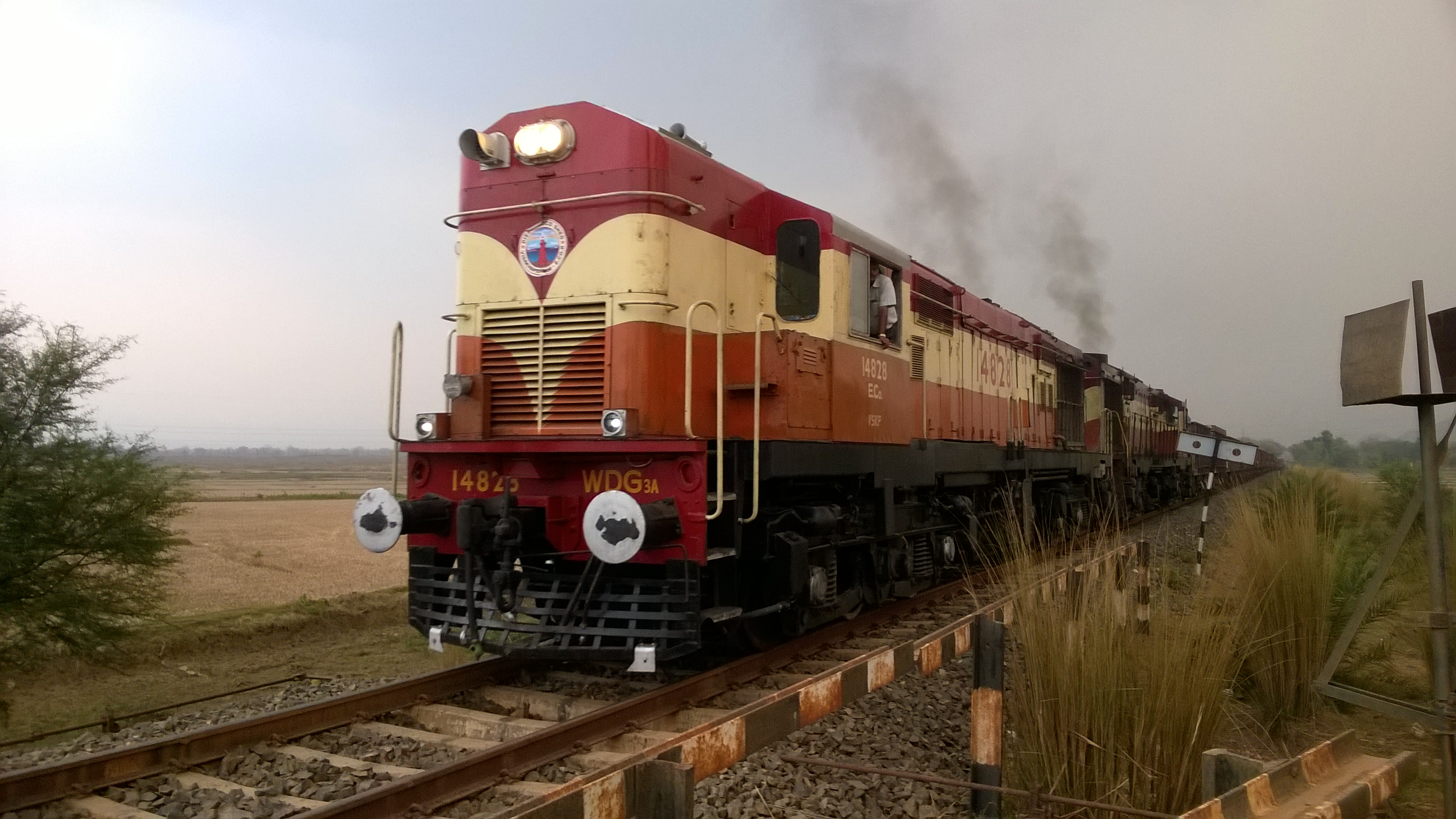
A cargo train coming from Bangriposi railway station

== Geography ==
It is located at 22°10′0″N 86°32′0″E, 174 metres (571 ft) above sea level.

== Location ==
National Highway 49 and State Highway 50 passes through Bangriposi. The town is surrounded by Similipal National park. The temple of Goddess Maa Dwarasuni is situated here. Budhabalanga river passes through Bangriposi. Bangriposi railway station serves with all the necessary facilities to the peoples. It has a great role in promoting tourism here.

== Demographics ==
Bangriposi is a medium size village located in Bangiriposi of Mayurbhanj district, Odisha with 130 families. The Bangriposi village has population of 525 of which 274 are males while 251 are females as per Population Census 2011.

In Bangriposi village population of children with age 0-6 is 56 which makes up 10.67% of total population of village. Average Sex Ratio of Bangriposi village is 916 which is lower than Odisha state average of 979. Child Sex Ratio for the Bangriposi as per census is 1074, higher than Odisha average of 941.

Bangriposi village has lower literacy rate compared to Odisha. In 2011, literacy rate of Bangriposi village was 69.72% compared to 72.87% of Odisha. In Bangriposi Male literacy stands at 80.16% while female literacy rate was 58.11%.

As per constitution of India and Panchyati Raaj Act, Bangriposi village is administrated by Sarpanch (Head of Village) who is elected representative of village.

== Education ==
=== List of colleges ===
- Laxmikanta College, Bangriposi

=== List of schools ===
- Laxmikanta Higher Secondary School
- Binodini Women's Higher Secondary School
- Bangriposi New Govt. High School
- Dwarasuni Girls' High school
- OAVS, Jamdapal, Bangriposi
- SSD Girls' High School, Bankati, Bangriposi
- EMRS, Bangriposi
- Saraswati Shishu Vidya Mandir, Bangriposi

=== Technical institutes ===
- Jyoti ITI, Bangriposi

== Politics ==
Bangriposi town is part of the Bangriposi Assembly Constituency and the Mayurbhanj Parliamentary Constituency in Odisha. The current Member of the Legislative Assembly (MLA) from Bangriposi Assembly Constituency is Sanjali Murmu of BJP, who was elected in 2024. The previous MLA from this seat was Sudam Marndi of the BJD, who won in the 2019 state elections. Earlier, Sarojini Hembram of BJD represented the constituency in 2009 and 2014. Other past representatives include Chaitanya Prasad Majhi (2004), Purusottam Naik (2000 and 1977), Ajen Murmu (1995), Sudam Marndi (1990), and Kangoi Singh (1985).

== Notable people ==
- Sanjali Murmu
- Sudam Marndi
- Sarojini Hembram

== See also ==
- Bangriposi railway station
- Bangriposi Assembly constituency
- List of urban local bodies in Odisha
