= Narasinghpur =

Town in Odisha, India

Narasinghpur ନରସିଂହପୁର
- Town
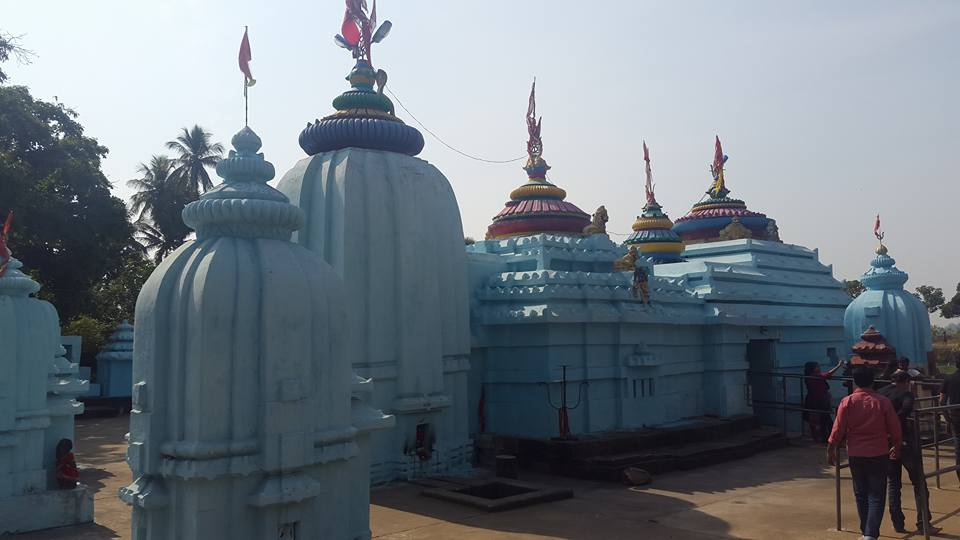
- Champanath Shiva Temple
- Nickname: The Temple Town
- Location within Odisha Location within India Location within Asia
- Coordinates: 20.467°N 85.083°E
- Country: India
- State: Odisha
- District: Cuttack
- Named for: Narasingh

Government
  - Body: Narasinghpur N.A.C.
  - Chairman: vacant
  - Executive officer: vacant

Population (2011)
  - Total: 10,000

Languages
  - Official: Odia, English
- Time zone: UTC+5:30 (IST)
- PIN: 754032
- Telephone code: 06721-
- Vehicle registration: OD
- Ethnicity: Odia people
- Climate: Aw (Köppen)
- Avg. summer temperature: 45 °C (113 °F)
- Avg. winter temperature: 10 °C (50 °F)
- Website: odisha.gov.in

Narasinghpur is a town and Notified Area Council in Cuttack district in the Indian state of Odisha.

Narasinghpur is named after its discoverer Narasingh who was later overthrown by Sri Mandardhar Harichandana Mohapatra. The small town has its own magnificent history. The local deity of the land is goddess Pragala.

== Geography ==
Narasinghpur is situated 100 km far from capital Bhubaneswar and 120 km far from its district headquarters Cuttack. Global positioning is at 20.467La/85.083Lo. One side of Narasinghpur is painted by the perennial giant Mahanadi River, where as the other side is escorted by the vast forest area with many mountains called Satakosia Wildlife Sanctuary.

This place is connecting to districts like Nayagarh district, Angul to its own Cuttack district.

== History ==
Narasinghpur was the capital of Narsinghpur State, a former princely state of India during the period of the British Raj. The state was also known as Arata Rajya. The kingdom was ruled by the Singhdev dynasty. The most renowned king was Sri Ananta Narayana Singhdev, who had got the title of Sandhamarka (means brave and efficient) by the Puri gajapati. He had also established the first high school in the block later named after him Ananta Narayana high school which once had a hostel. The last king of the state was Sri Trilochan Singhdev, who was also the first MLA of the constituency.

Rulers of Narasinghpur

- 1671 – 1701 Mandardhar Harichandan Mohapatra
- 1701 – 1723 Kochali Harichandan Mohapatra
- 1723 – 1765 Biswambar Harichandan Mohapatra
- 1765 – 1775 Rrishna Chandra Harichandan Mohapatra
- 1775 – 1798 Nimai Charan Harichandan Mohapatra
- 1798 – 1826 Jaganath Harichandan Mohapatra
- 1826 – 1859 Somanath Harichandan Mohapatra
- 1859 – 1884 Braja Sundar Harichandan Mohapatra
- 4 Dec 1884 – 1912 Sadhu Charan Man Singh Harichandan (b. 1883 – d. ?) Mohapatra
- 18 Jul 1912 – 5 Jul 1921 Ramchandra Man Singh Harichandan (b. 1906 – d. 1921) Mohapatra
- 5 Jul 1921 – 15 Aug 1947 Ananta Narayan Man Singh (b. 1908 – d. 1963) Harichandan Mohapatra
- The last king Trilochan Mansingh Harichandana Mohapatra (Trilochan Singh dev), the elder son of Ananta narayana Singhdev became the first MLA of newly built Badamba-Narasinghpur constituency.

On 24 February 2024, the Government of Odisha upgraded Narasinghpur village to be a NAC.

== Tourism ==
Narasinghpur is known as a vibrant tourist place with its own charisma, pleasant ambiance and many tourist spots. It is also known as a 'temple town'. Tourist places in the area include:

- Deojhar Waterfall (ଦେଓଝର ଝରଣା)- This is an waterfall located Cuttack district. The site is a Odisha tourism recognized. There is another waterfall situated near to it named Dabarakhola waterfall, which has two levels.
- Satakisia gorge (ସାତକୋଶିଆ ଗଣ୍ଡ)-An eco-tourism place surround by the Mahanadi river. It is the largest gorge in Odisha. The place is present inside the Satakosia tiger sanctuary.
- Maa pragala pitha (ପ୍ରଗଳା ପୀଠ). This is the temple of the city deity Maa Pragala (ନରସିଂହପୁରର ଅଧୀଷ୍ଠାତ୍ରୀ ଦେବୀ ମା ପ୍ରଗଳା). The place has local tribal villages and an Ashrama school in the vicinity. There is also a dam near the temple, which is used as a picnic spot and receives active footfalls of tourists round the year.
- Baneswara Temple (ବାଣେଶ୍ୱର ମନ୍ଦିର)- Standing with carvings in the rock wall, this temple is dedicated to Lord Shiva. There is a legend behind the place. A Rakshasa named Banasura praised and impressed Lord Shiva here and built the temple.
- Rajabati (ରାଜବାଟୀ)- It's the Royal palace of Narasinghpur royal family. The now abandoned palace becomes busy with visitors during Ratha-Yatra, Kartika purnima, Pragala Yatra, and Ashtashambhu Yatra, etc.
- Budha Budhi Ghati (ବୁୁଢ଼ା ବୁୁଢୀ ଘାଟି)-It's a ravane on the Narasinghpur-Angul road. There is a viewpoint from which visitors can view the surrounding hill ranges.
- Indra Bhawan(ଇନ୍ଦ୍ର ଭବନ)- It is the government guest house of the city. Surrounded by the green trees, the building lies on a small hill. The road to the building was made by cutting the hill.
- Sisupathar dam(ଶିଶୁପଥର Dam) - A large dam near the village Sisupathar.
- Champanathadeva temple (ଚମ୍ପାନାଥଦେବ ମନ୍ଦିର)- A Shiva temple in the village of champeswara named after the deity. Here the Shiva lingam is west facing in contradictory to east facing lingams in Hindu tradition. The temple, as in most Shiva temples, has a pond that is home to a large number of tortoises.
- Vishvanatha Temple (ବିଶ୍ୱନାଥ ମନ୍ଦିର)- Lying on a hill platform, the Shiva temple attracts the attention of city. The temple is accompanied by a Hanuman temple at the back side which has an inclined large rock surface from which the observer gets a 360° view of the town with its scenic coconut trees and the smiling Mahanadi river. The temple is lit during Maha Shivaratri.
- Jagannath Temple (ଜଗନ୍ନାଥ ମନ୍ଦିର)- The temple is dedicated to Lord Jagannath. The temple has a small Shiva temple with Shiva lingam which is auto - arisen (ଫୁଟାଲିଂଗ) from the earth. The campus has also an widow home. This temple has a different type of architecture than usual temples.
- Raghunatha Temple(ରଘୁନାଥ ମନ୍ଦିର)- It is the temple of Shri Rama. Every year Ramleela (drama of Ramayana) is performed here where people spend sleepless spring nights by watching the drama on the temple Natyamandapa.
- Ashtashambhu Temples (ଅଷ୍ଟଶମ୍ଭୁ ମନ୍ଦିର)- These are other Shiva temples of the area. There is a festival of this area named Ashtashambhu Yatra celebrated in spring when all the Shambhus (Shiva) meet at a place and then march for the Rajabati (Royal Palace). This a festival where reunion of eight auto - arisen Shambhus(ଫୁଟାଲିଂଗ) and other shiv temple Shambhus happens, which is one of its unique in Odisha to be believed.
- Gopinatha Matha (ଗୋପୀନାଥ ମଠ)
- Maa Baseli Temple (ମା ବାସେଳି ମନ୍ଦିର). This temple dedicated to goddess Baseli situated near village Baselihata.
- Dayasambhu Parbata (ଦୟାଶମ୍ଭୁ ପର୍ବତ)-A holy Place of Lord Shiva Estd. By Dayanidhi Paramahansa Dev

== Culture ==
The temple town Narasinghpur has a rich historical culture. The town had been the centre of monarchial rule during Gadajaat Odisha. As being under direct influence of the king the town had been celebrating Vijayadashami, Ratha Yatra, Holi, Ramleela, Astashambhu Yatra, Maha Shivaratri, Shitalashasthi, Ganesha puja, Saraswati puja, Prgala yatra, Kumar purnima, Gajalaxmi puja, Vishvakarma puja, hanuman jayanti, Diwali, Kali puja, Chhadakhai Yatra.

The Astasambhu yatra is a festival indigenous to the area celebrated generally in Spring: Odia-Phalguna (ଫାଲଗୁନ). This is similar to Melana in other parts of Odisha. In phaguna the sambhus sitting on brusabhas travel from village to village from homes to homes bestowing blessings upon the devotees. People pray the shambhus with offering flowers, Prasāda, lighting earthen lamps and fragrance sticks. The shambhus give phagu (colours) or Abira as the month is of phaguna, the festive season of holi, the festival of colours.

On the occasion of Ashtasambhu Melana (ଅସ୍ତଶମ୍ଭୁ ମେଲଣ) the sambhus unite at the ashtasambhu unition ground in front of hanumantia pond. The night sky is paroxytoned in the sounds of e.g., Dhola and Ghanta. The unition ground becomes sacred and the devotees offer their devotion to the deities. The chants of mantras creates a spiritual environment. The breeze blows carrying, along with it, the smells of flowers. The people become overwhelmed with the shiva naama and bhajans. After the gathering of all sambhus they together march towards the rajabati, king's palace in the crowd of devotees with the sounds of ghanta-ghantaa. There Lord Vishnu comes out of his temple in the royal campus and a function is held which is called hara-hari milana (ହର ହରି ମିଳନ).

From the famous occasion of Chhadakhai Narasighpur Mahosthav(also famously known as Chhadakhai Jatra) is celebrated, which is usually continues for seven to nine days. Hundreds of vendors open their stalls and several amusement activities, melody/musical and stand-up nights are organized in the famous chhadakhai padia near Narasighpur police station. This is a festival every Narasighpuria waits throughout the year to cherish.

== Gallery ==
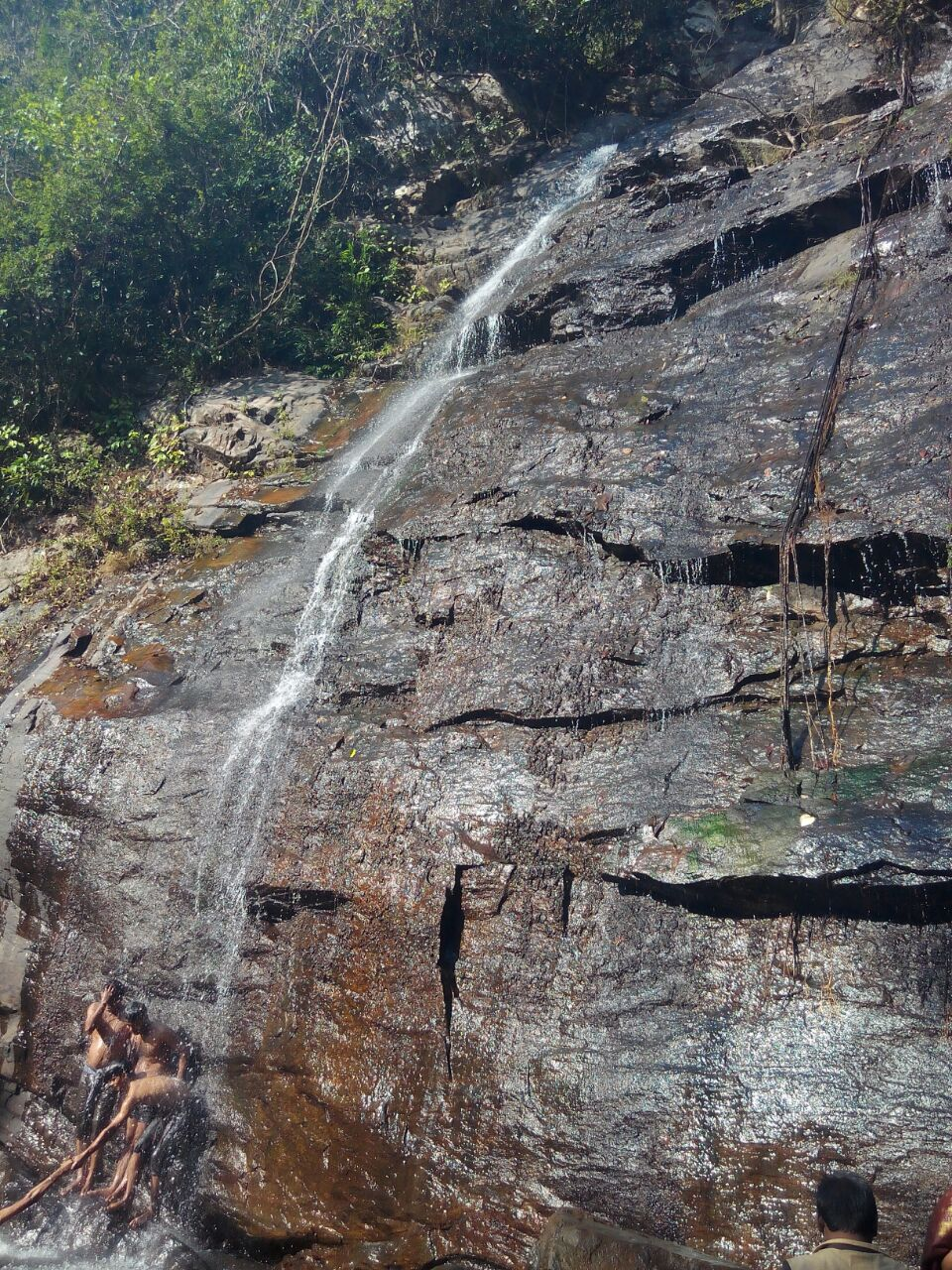
Deojhar waterfall is one of the waterfalls in Odisha which is situated in Narasinghpur Block of Cuttack District.

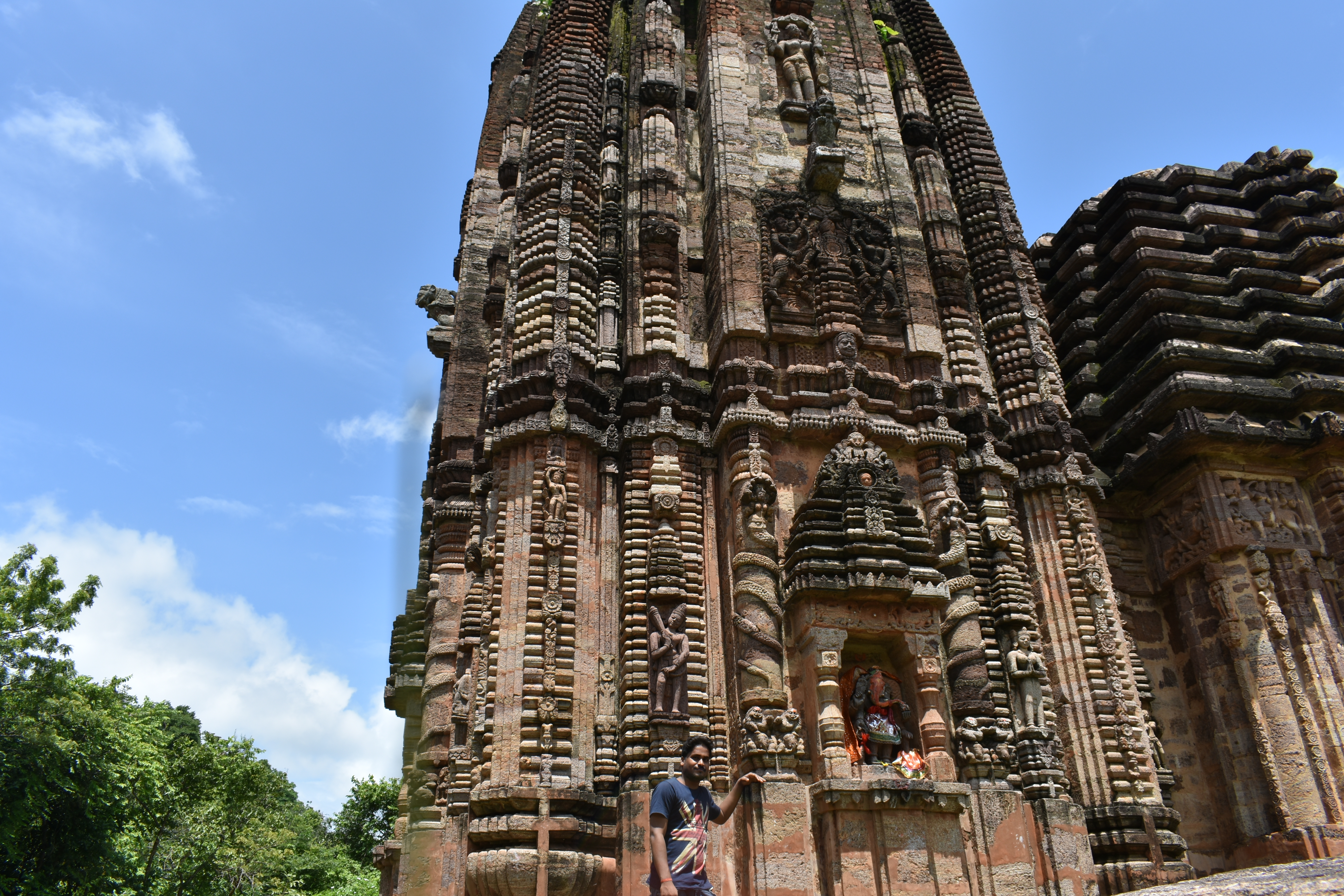
Baneswara temple, the place where a Rakshasa named Banasura worshiped Lord Shiva.

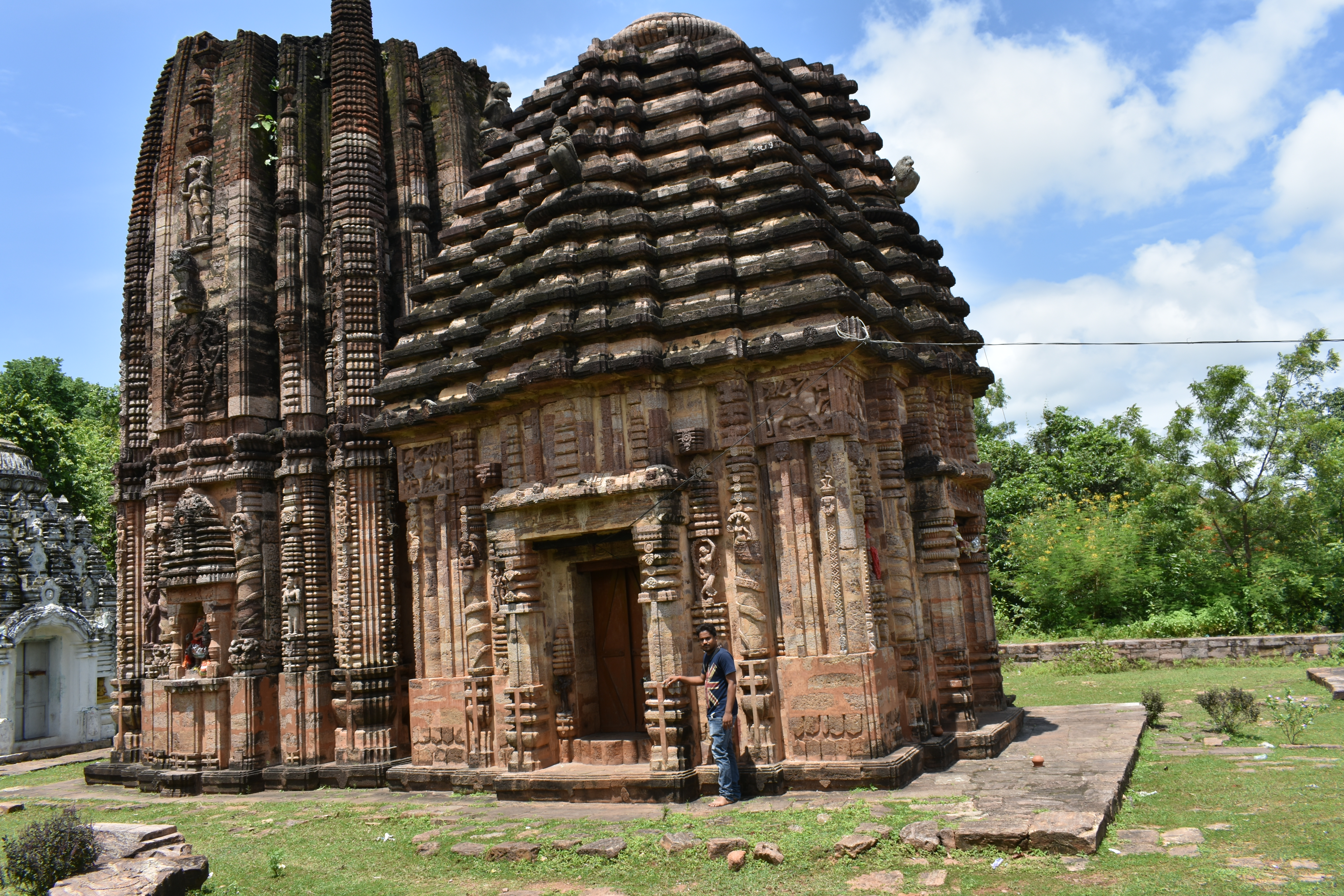
Baneswara temple

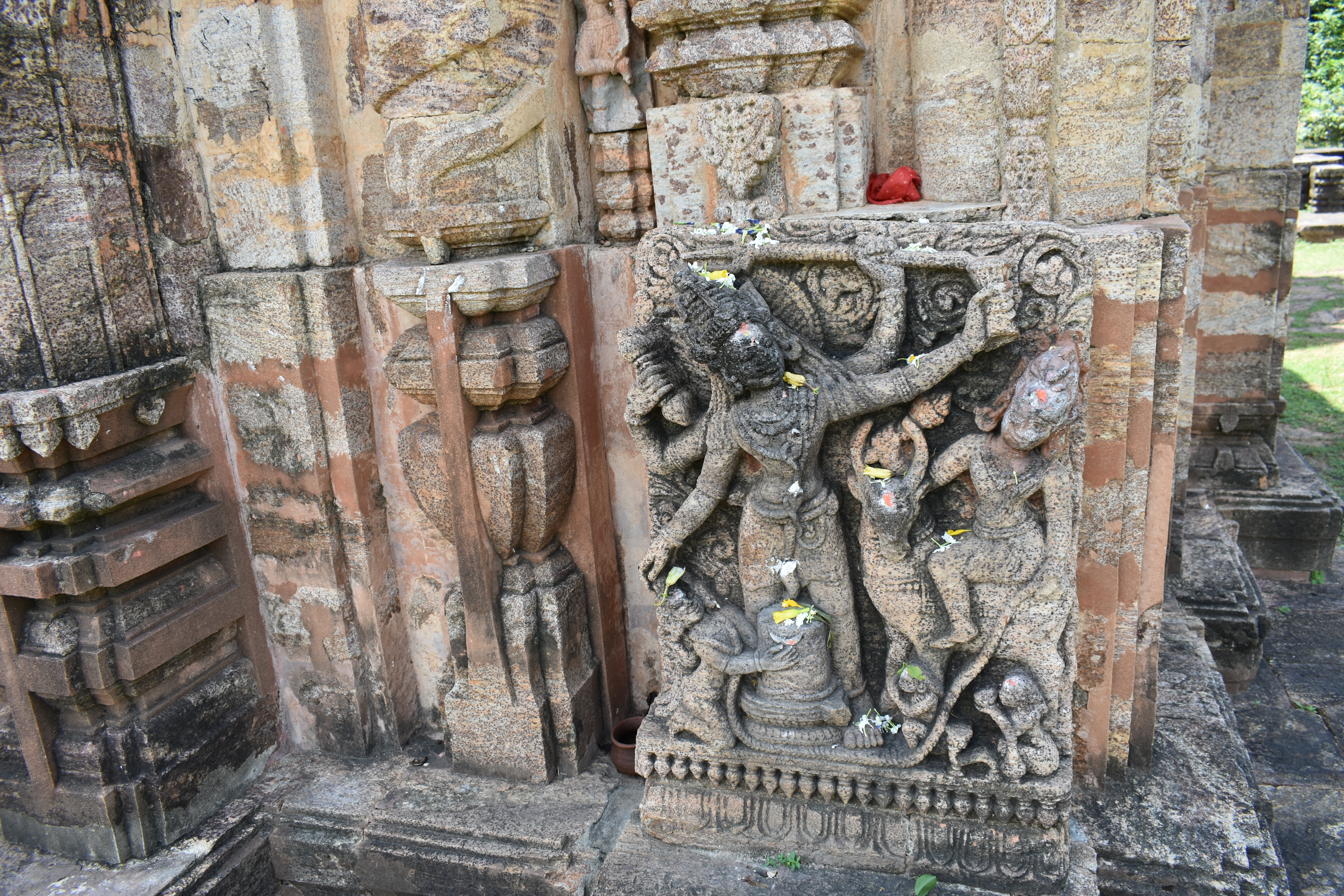
A sculpture in the wall of temple

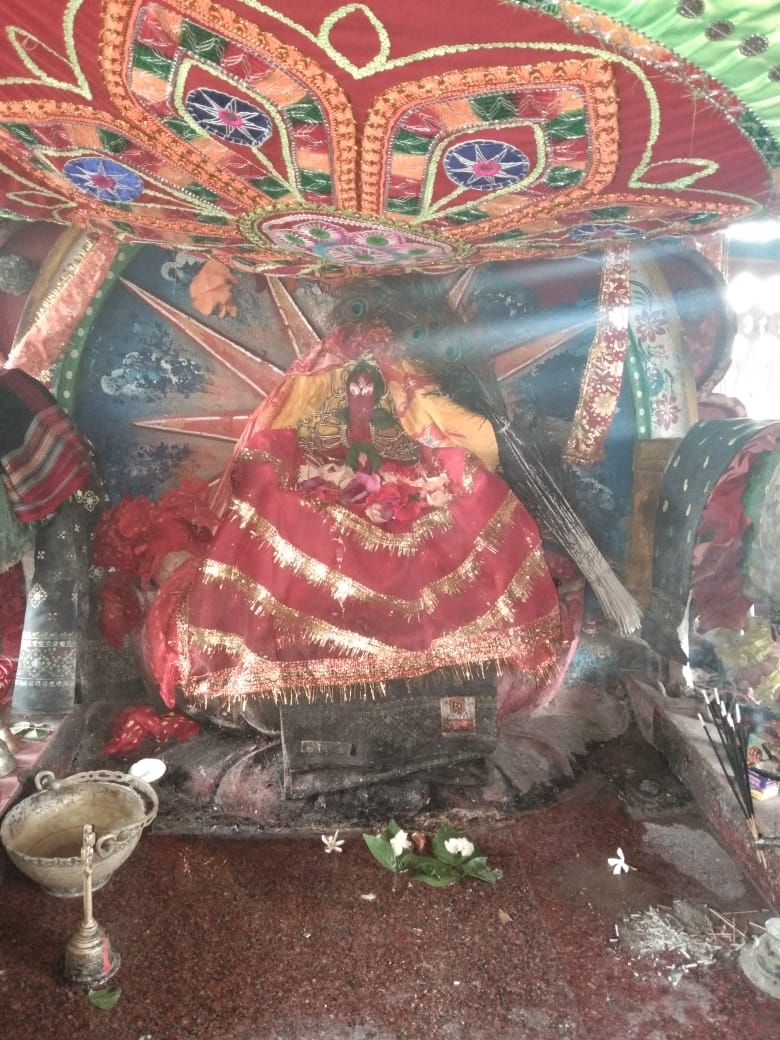
The sword being worshipped as goddess pragala

== Politics ==
It is part of the Baramba (Odisha Vidhan Sabha constituency) which includes Baramba block and Narasinghpur block. Sri Devi Prasad Mishra, MLA of the constituency is native of Narasinghpur.
