= Paramahamsa =

Title of honor applied to Hindu spiritual teachers

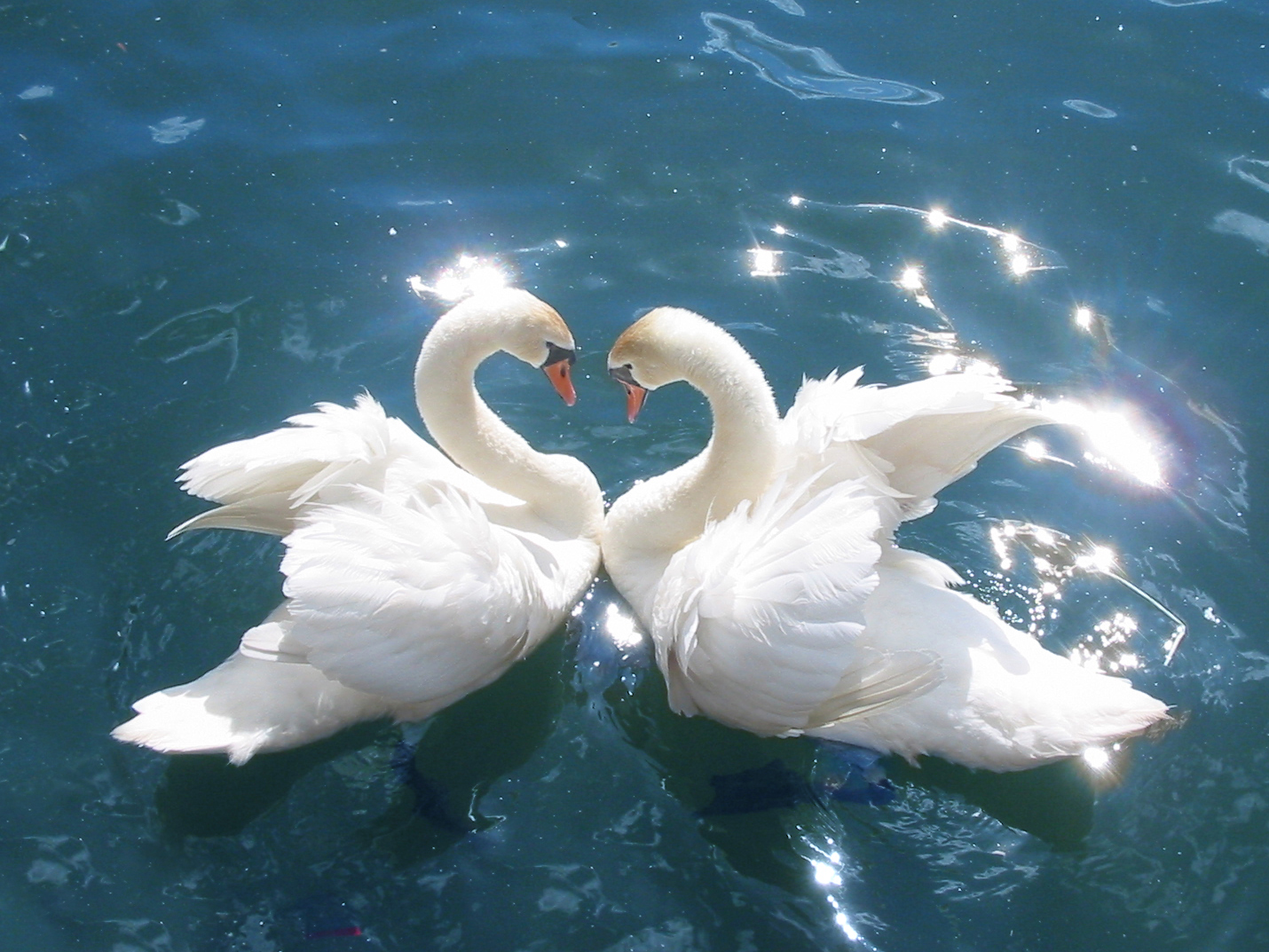
The swan is a symbol of purity and transcendence in Vedantic teaching.

Paramahamsa (Sanskrit: परमहंस), also spelled paramahansa or paramhansa, is a Sanskrit religio-theological title of honour applied to Hindu spiritual teachers who have become enlightened. The title literally means "supreme swan". The swan is equally at home on land and on water; similarly, the true sage is equally at home in the realms of matter and of spirit. To be in divine ecstasy and simultaneously to be actively wakeful is the paramahamsa state; the 'royal swan' of the soul floats in the cosmic ocean, beholding both its body and the ocean as manifestations of the same Spirit. The word 'Paramahamsa' signifies one who is Awakened in all realms. Paramahamsa is the highest level of spiritual development in which a union with ultimate reality has been attained by a sannyasi.

== Etymology ==
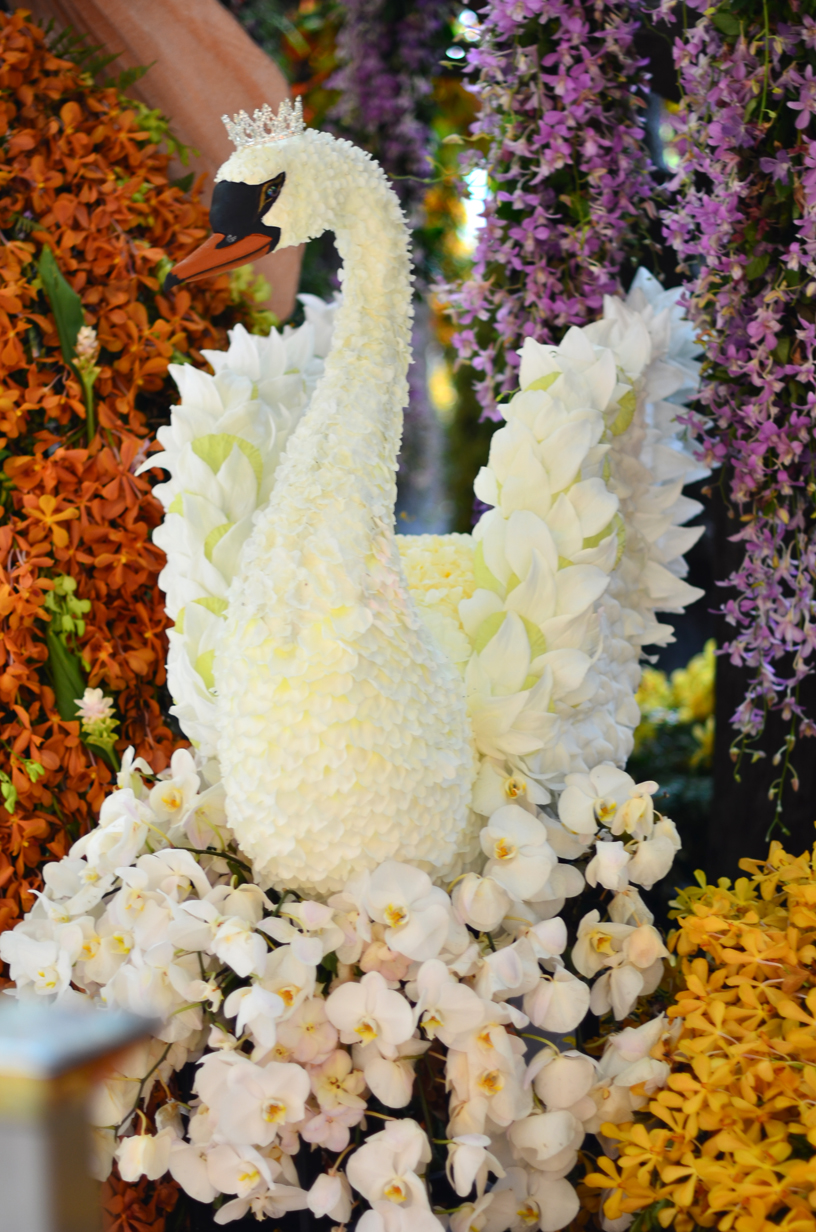
Beautiful painting of Swan.

Paramahamsa is a Sanskrit word translated as 'supreme swan'.The word is compounded of Sanskrit परम parama meaning 'supreme', 'highest', or 'transcendent' (from PIE per meaning 'through', 'across', or 'beyond', cognate with English far) and Sanskrit हंस hamsa meaning 'swan or wild goose'. The prefix parama is the same element seen in Parameshwara, a title for God. In Hindic tradition, swans are noted for characteristics of discipline, stamina, grace, and beauty. "Hamsa" may be spelled "hansa."As described by Paramahansa Yogananda, author of "Autobiography of a Yogi" in which he states that hansa literally means "swan.""The white swan," he clarifies " is mythologically represented as the vehicle or mount of Brahma the Creator.The sacred hansa, said to have the power of extracting only milk from a mixture of milk and water, is thus a symbol of spiritual discrimination." Yogananda adds "Ahan-sa or ‘hansa (pronounced hong-sau) is literally “I am He.” These potent sanskrit syllables possess a vibratory connection with the incoming and the outgoing breath. Thus with his every breath man unconsciously asserts the truth of his being."

In keeping with the construct of Sanskrit, which often layers multiple meanings upon or within words, Hamsa may also be a religious pun or allegory with a philosophical meaning. One such etymology suggests that the words 'aham' and 'sa' are joined to become 'hamsa'; aham is 'I' or 'me' and sa is 'he', together meaning 'I am he'. Here, 'I' refers to the jivatma or jivatama, the living soul, and 'he' the paramatma or paramatama or supreme soul (the alternative spellings are due to differing Romanisations of the Sanskrit words). This relationship reflects of Advaita philosophy, which advocates the oneness of jivatma and paramatma. The word aham is common to many Eastern religions. From aham is derived ahamkara or ego.

== Paramahansa Upanishad ==
The Paramahansa Upanishad is one of the 108 Upanishadic Hindu scriptures, written in Sanskrit and is one of the 31 Upanishads attached to the Atharvaveda. It is classified as one of the Sannyasa Upanishads. According to Ramanujacharya, Paramhansa is one of the forms of Lord Vishnu who imparted vedas to Lord Brahma in the form of Divine Swan as per Vishnu-Sahasranama.

The Upanishad is a discourse between the Hindu god Brahma and sage Narada. Their conversation is centered on the characteristics of Paramahansa (highest soul) Yogi. The text describes the monk as a Jivanmukta, a liberated soul while alive, and Videhamukta is liberation in afterlife.

The Upanishad, in its opening and concluding hymns, emphasises the primacy of infiniteness of the Brahman and the Universe, with the Brahman representing the infinite.The Upanishad's theme is presented in four hymns as an explanation by Lord Brahma to Narada's query on the aspect of the path of the Paramahansa Yogis.

== Mythology ==
The hamsa (swan) is the vahana, the mount or vehicle, of the god Brahma. In the Vedas and the Purânas it is a symbol for the soul/Soul. The hamsa is said to be the only creature that is capable of separating milk from water once they have been mixed; symbolically this is the display of great spiritual discrimination. It is symbolic for a spiritually advanced being who is capable of controlling the breath energy in such a way that he only absorbs pure vibrations from all the different energies the world contains. To the Paramahamsa (the supreme celestial Swan) on the other hand, the whole of creation is God himself, there is nothing else but God alone. This person is a fully realised soul, completely liberated from all bonds with the world, who knows no obligations, no likes or dislikes. He is without any needs because he is completely immersed in God.

== Theology ==
Paramahamsa, as a religion / theological title, is applied to an adept class of Hindu renunciates, liberated, realised masters who, having attained the supreme yogic state, or nirvikalpa samādhi.

The hamsa mantra indicates the sound made by the inhalation ("ha") and exhalation ("sa") of the breath. And the space between inhalation -exhalation is denote with the sound ("ma"). Hence it's called ("Hamsa").

== Privileged use ==
Some followers believe title cannot be assumed by oneself, but must be conferred by a recognised authority, either another individual swami who is himself esteemed as enlightened, or by a committee of spiritual leaders.

== Other meaning ==
Paramahaṃsa is also the title of one of the Upanishads. (Note: In Sanskrit, a pre-consonantal nasal is written with a diacritic dot (the Anusvara) above the preceding character. The exact realization of the nasalization must be inferred from the context. Thus, we have Paramahaṃsa, Paramahamsa, Paramahaṇsa, and Paramahansa as equivalent transliterations.)

== Paramahamsa title personalities ==
- Dayanidhi Paramahansa Dev
- Paramahamsa Shri Gajanan Maharaj
- Lahiri Mahasaya
- Bhaduri Mahasaya – Paramhamsa Maharshi Nagendranath Bhaduri
- Narayana Guru
- Nigamananda Paramahansa
- Paramahansa Yogananda
- Ramakrishna Paramahamsa
- Paramhamsa Vishwananda
- Paramhans Yogi Abhinav

== Bibliography ==
- Olivelle, Patrick (1992). The Samnyasa Upanisads. Oxford University Press. ISBN 978-0195070453.
- Prasad, Ramanuj (1 January 2003). Know the Upanishads. V&S Publishers. ISBN 978-81-223-0831-0.
- Tinoco, Carlos Alberto (1997). Upanishads. IBRASA. ISBN 978-85-348-0040-2.
