= Sanjali Murmu =

Indian politician

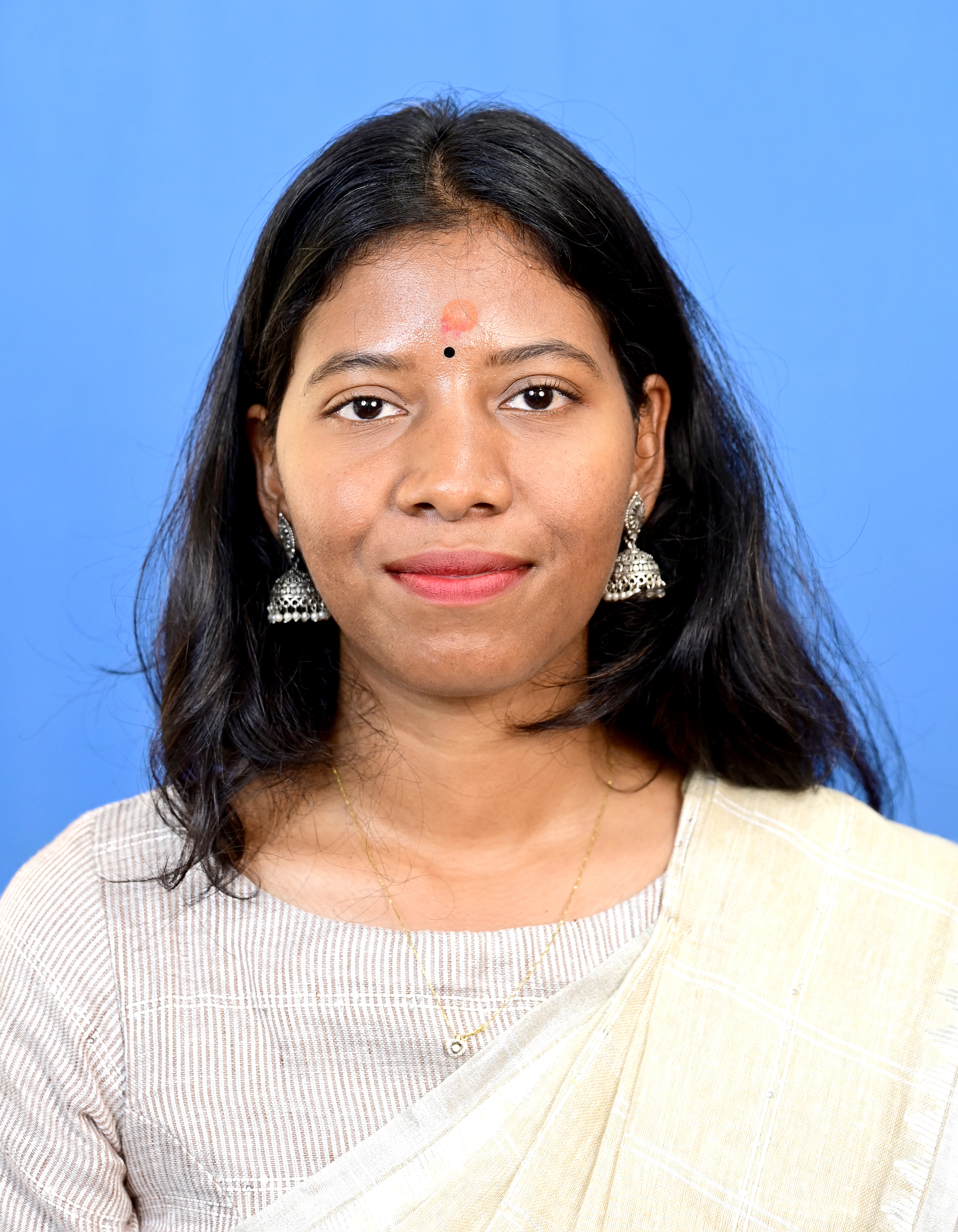

Member of the Odisha Legislative Assembly
- Incumbent
- Assumed office 2024
- Constituency: Bangriposi

Personal details
- Born: 10 June 1994 (age 32)
- Party: Bharatiya Janata Party
- Education: Utkal University (MA)

Sanjali Murmu (born 10 June 1994) is an Indian politician from Odisha. She is a member of the Odisha Legislative Assembly, representing the Bangriposi Assembly constituency in Mayurbhanj District. She represents Bharatiya Janata Party. She won the 2024 Odisha Legislative Assembly election.

== Early life and education ==
Murmu hails from Bangriposi. Her father Suguda Murmu is a farmer. She completed her Master of Arts in History in 2017 at Vani Vihar, Bhubaneswar, which is affiliated with Utkal University.

== Career ==
Murmu made her political debut winning the 2024 Odisha Legislative Assembly election from Bangriposi Assembly Constituency representing Bharatiya Janata Party. She defeated Ranjita Marandi of Biju Janata Dal by a margin of 34,476 votes.

== See also ==
- Bangriposi
- Bangriposi assembly constituency
