= Byasanagar =

- Town
- Location in Odisha, India Byasanagar (India)
- Coordinates: 20.9460°N 86.1301°E
- Country: India
- State: Odisha
- District: Jajapur

Languages
  - Official: Odia
- Time zone: UTC+5:30 (IST)
- Website: odisha.gov.in

Byasanagar or Vyasanagar is a town and a municipality in Jajapur district in the state of Odisha, India. It is also colloquially known as Jajpur Road. It is home to an industrial belt and hosts several steel manufacturing companies, including Neelachal Ispat Nigam Limited, MESCO, Tata Steel, and Jindal Steel. According to district officials, there are around 14 major companies and several small companies in the vicinity of the town. The town is also home to some eminent people in Odisha, including P. C. Ghadei (Ex-Finance Minister), the late Ashok Das (earlier MLA), Ram Chandra Khuntia (Congress), political leader Giridhari Barik (BJD), Priti Ranjan Ghadei (MLA), actor Akash Dasnayak, his actress aunt Anita Dash, and actress Naina Das. It is part of the Korei Vidhan Sabha constituency.

== History ==
The town developed around the railway station on Howrah Puri Line. At that time it was the nearest rail head for the two towns Jajpur and Keonjhar. That is how the station came to be known as Jajpur Keonjhar Road. The municipality was established in 1963. It celebrated its golden jubilee in 2013.

== Demographics ==
As of 2011 India census, Byasanagar had a population of 37,609. Males constitute 53% of the population and females 47%. Byasanagar has an average literacy rate of 80%, higher than the national average of 59.5%; with male literacy of 79% and female literacy of 66%; 11% of the population is under 6 years of age. It is one of the fastest growing city in terms of industries.

== Transportation ==
The railway station is the Jajpur Keonjhar Road Railway Station which falls on the Howrah-Chennai main line and is the only major stop between Bhadrak and Cuttack.

The town is also only about 15 km (9 mi) from the National Highway 16. Various bus services connect Byasanagar to Bhubaneswar via Cuttack, Rourkela via Keonjhar, and Balasore via Bhadrak.

The nearest airport is Biju Patnaik International Airport at Bhubaneswar, the state capital.

== Culture ==
The mythological Vyasa Sarovara is located here. It hosts an 11-day fair in celebration of Lord Vyasadeva in the month of March.

== Industry ==
Ferrochrome Plant was initially commissioned in November 1969 as a division of IDCOL with an installed manufacturing capacity of 12,000 MT p.a. of High Carbon Ferro Chrome (HCFC) with reduction furnace. Subsequently, additional capacity of 10,000 MT p.a. of Low Carbon Ferro Chrome (LCFC) with slag furnace was created in October 1970. However, due to entry of relatively cheaper South African ferrochrome and general slow down in the demand of LCFC, IDCOL decided to stop the production of LCFC and with minor modifications, converted its slag furnace into reduction furnace in July 1998, so as to produce an additional 6,000 MT p.a. of HCFC. With this, the total installed capacity of the HCFC stood at 18,000 MT p.a. The current installed capacity is 19,000 MT p.a. The rated capacity of the furnaces are 9 MVA and 6.5 MVA. The plant was taken over by IFCAL in April, 2002. The operations at the Ferrochrome plant include mining of chrome ore from open cast mines, beneficiation of ore and smelting. The production process involves reduction of chromium oxide to chromium by electric arc furnace to produce HCFC by further reduction of the metallic oxide with the help of carbon.

The plant is located at Jajpur Road in the district of Jajpur, Odisha, and is about 12 km from NH-5 connecting Bhubaneswar and Kolkata. The nearest railway station is Jajpur Keonjhar Road Railway Station which is about 2 km away from the plant and the nearest airport is Bhubaneswar (also the State Capital) about 120 km from the plant.
