= Sudam Marndi =

Indian politician (born 1967)

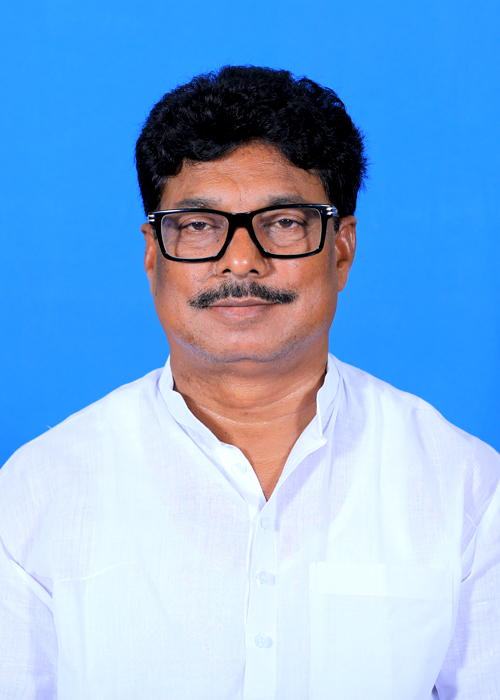

Minister of School and Mass Education Government of Odisha
- In office 21 May 2023 – 12 June 2024

President of BJD Mayurbhanj District
- Incumbent
- Assumed office 21 February 2019

Member of Odisha Legislative Assembly
- Incumbent
- Assumed office 2014–2024
- Constituency: Bangriposi
- In office 1995–2004
- Constituency: Kuliana
- In office 1990–1995
- Constituency: Bangriposi

Member of Parliament, Lok Sabha
- In office 2004–2009
- Constituency: Mayurbhanj

Personal details
- Born: 2 June 1967 (age 58) Kandalia, Bangriposi, Mayurbhanj district, Odisha, India
- Party: Biju Janata Dal
- Other political affiliations: Jharkhand Mukti Morcha
- Spouse: Ranjita Marndi (m. 1985)
- Parents: Laxman Marndi (father); Sita Marndi (mother)

Sudam Marndi (born 2 June 1967) is an Indian politician from Odisha who was the Minister of Revenue and Disaster Management in Government of Odisha. He is a fifth term member of odisha legislative assembly. He was a member of the 14th Lok Sabha of India. He represented the Mayurbhanj constituency of Orissa and is a member of the Biju Janata Dal (BJD) political party.

== Political career ==
Electoral history
Election	House	Constituency	Party	Votes	%	Result
2024	Lok Sabha	Mayurbhanj	BJD	366,637	31.23	Lost
2009	Lok Sabha	Mayurbhanj	JMM	190,470	23.09	Lost
2004	Lok Sabha	Mayurbhanj	JMM	260,529	37.43	Won
2019	Odisha Legislative Assembly	Bangriposi	BJD	72,050	42.91	Won
2014	Odisha Legislative Assembly	Bangriposi	BJD	62,406	40.64	Won
2009	Odisha Legislative Assembly	Bangriposi	JMM	37,440	30.91	Lost
2004	Odisha Legislative Assembly	Kuliana	JMM	41,020	37.30	Lost
2000	Odisha Legislative Assembly	Kuliana	JMM	48,703	51.24	Won
1995	Odisha Legislative Assembly	Kuliana	JMM	33,386	33.91	Won
1990	Odisha Legislative Assembly	Bangriposi	Ind	14,633	28.43	Won
