= Dhamanagar =

- Town
- Location in Odisha, India Dhamanagar (India)
- Coordinates: 20.92°N 86.45°E
- Country: India
- State: Odisha
- District: Bhadrak
- Elevation: 4 m (13 ft)

Population (2001)
  - Total: 18,555

Languages
  - Official: Odia
- Time zone: UTC+5:30 (IST)
- Vehicle registration: OD
- Website: odisha.gov.in

Dhamnagar is a town and a notified area committee in Bhadrak district in the state of Odisha, India.

== Geography ==
Dhamanagar is located at 20.92°N 86.45°E. It has an average elevation of 4 m (13 ft).

== Demographics ==
As of 2001 India census, Dhamanagar had a population of 18,555. Males constitute 51% of the population and females 49%. Dhamanagar has an average literacy rate of 52%, lower than the national average of 59.5%: male literacy is 61% and, female literacy is 43%. In Dhamanagar, 15% of the population is under 6 years of age.

== Politics ==
Current MLA from Dhamanagar Assembly Constituency is Bishnu Sethi of BJP, who won the seat in State elections of 2019, defeating Rajendra Kumar Das, of BJD. Previous MLAs from this seat were Muktikanta Mandal and Rajendra Das, both from BJD and won the seat in 2014 and 2009 respectively, Manmohan Samal who won this seat in 2004 as BJP and BJD coalition candidate, Manas Ranjan Mallick who won in 2000 from the then BJP state president Manmohan Samal.

Manmohan came into controversy in 2006 March 26 by sacrificing an animal in front of Maa Rakshyakali of Rameswarpur. Another controversy made a black spot in his political career is a relationship with a woman. Jagannath Rout who won in 1995 and in 1985 representing INC and in 1980 representing INC(I). Hrudananda Mallik won in 1990 representing JD and in 1977 representing JNP.

Dhamanagar is part of Bhadrak (Lok Sabha constituency).
