= Karlamunda =

- Raral
- Location within Odisha Location within India
- Coordinates: 20.36°N 83.46°E
- Country: India
- State: Odisha
- District: Kalahandi
- Elevation: 178 m (584 ft)
- Time zone: UTC+5:30
- Telephone code: 766032
- Vehicle registration: OD-/OR-

Karlamunda is a town in Bhawanipatna sub-division in Kalahandi district in Orissa State.This town is maintaining 70 km distance from its District main city Bhawanipatna and 430 km far from its State capital Bhubaneswar.
