= Balimela =

- Town
- Location in Odisha, India Balimela (India)
- Coordinates: 18.25°N 82.13°E
- Country: India
- State: Odisha
- District: Malkangiri

Government
  - Type: democracy
  - Body: Notified area Council
- Elevation: 418 m (1,371 ft)

Population (2001)
  - Total: 11,500

Languages
  - Official: Odia
- Time zone: UTC+5:30 (IST)
- Vehicle registration: OD 30
- Website: odisha.gov.in

Balimela is a town and a notified area committee in Malkangiri district in the Indian state of Odisha. Odia is the local language. Balimela comes under Chitrakonda assembly constituency.

== Geography ==
Balimela is located at 18.25°N 82.13°E. It has an average elevation of 418 metres (1371 feet). Balimela is surrounded by mountains and prone to rain. In summer, the temperature runs above 45 °C.

== Demographics ==
As of 2001 India census, Balimela had a population of 11,500. Males constitute 52% of the population and females 48%. Balimela has an average literacy rate of 57%, lower than the national average of 59.5%; with 60% of the males and 40% of females literate. 13% of the population is under 6 years of age. The population has increased these days and as per unofficial sources it is more than 18000 now. Around 90% of people are Hindusin Balimela where as out of the total population 10% are Christian and 1% are Muslim.
