= Tihidi =

Indian subdistrict

- Town
- Location in Odisha, India Tihidi (India)
- Coordinates: 20°59′29″N 86°38′18″E
- Country: India
- State: Odisha
- District: Bhadrak district

Population
  - Total: 195,003 up to 2,011

Languages
  - Official: Odia
- Time zone: UTC+5:30 (IST)
- PIN: 756130
- Vehicle registration: OD
- Member of Parliament: Avimanyu Sethi, BJP
- Constituency: Bhadrak
- Website: odisha.gov.in

Tihidi is a town in Tihidi tehsil in Bhadrak District of Odisha State, India. It is located 19 kilometres (12 mi) east of the district headquarters, Bhadrak.
