= Dayanidhi Paramahansa Dev =

Hindu spiritual leader

Brahma Abadhuta SriGuru Dayanidhi Paramahansa ବ୍ରହ୍ମ ଅବଧୂତ ଶ୍ରୀଗୁରୁ ଦୟାନିଧୀ ପରମହଂସ ଦେବ
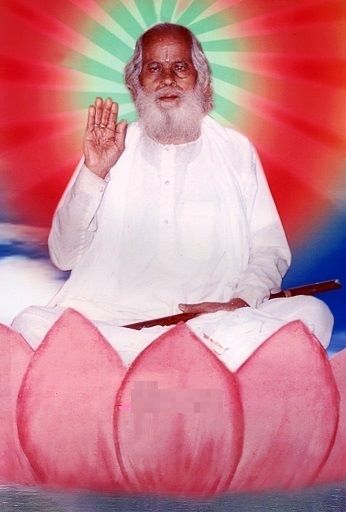
- (Dayanidhi Paramahansa Dev)

Personal life
- Born: Dayanidhi; 18 August 1905 Odisha, India
- Died: 17 June 1992 (aged 86) Matiabruj, west Bengal, India
- Notable work(s): Kharaswata Kalpa, Maya Jangula, Kalpalata
- Honors: Paramahansa, Brahma Abadhuta

Religious life
- Religion: Hinduism
- Philosophy: Bhakti, Yoga,

Religious career
- Teacher: Sunyaguru
- Disciples: Brahmananda Das, Ramanlal Dasmandal

Quotation

make fully Trust on me, I'll take you beyond mokhya .

Brahma Abadhuta Sri Guru Dayanidhi Paramahansa (18 August 1905 – 18 August 1992) was an Indian sadguru, yogi, mystic and a Hindu spiritual leader well known in India. He was associated with the shakti school and viewed as a perfect spiritual master of gyan, yoga and prema or bhakti. His followers idealized him as their worshipped and beloved thakura (ठाकुर).

Dayanidhi was born into an Odia family in the hamlet of Jajpur in Odisha. He was a sannyasi from Shankar's school. After his ordination as a sannyasi, he came to be known as Brahma Abadhuta Sri Guru Dayanidhi Paramahansa Dev.

Dayanidhi's followers believe that he achieved siddhi (perfection) in different sadhanas (spiritual disciplines): gyan, yoga and prema. Based on these experiences, he wrote some books: Kalpalata, Kharaswata Kalpa, Maya Jangula, Baya Dayanidhi, and SadGuru. Dayanidhi reportedly experienced the state of Nirvikalpa Samadhi.

After retiring from Saraswata sangha, Dayanidhi spent the last days of his life in Kolkata.

== Field of study ==
When Dayanidhi went to different regions of Odisha he learned about astrophysics, cosmology and meditation.
