= Chitrada =

- GramPanchayat
- Location within Odisha Location within India
- Coordinates: 21.50°N 86.56°E
- Country: India
- State: Odisha
- District: Mayurbhanj

Languages
  - Official: Oriya
- Time zone: UTC+5:30 (IST)
- PIN: 757 018
- Telephone code: 06793-25xxxx/ 06793-26xxxx

Chitrada is a Gram panchayat in Mayurbhanj district, Orissa, India. The village is 620 acres (2.5 km^{2}) large. It is located 25 km far from Baripada, the headquarters of Mayurbhanj district.
Chitrada is well known for its flora and fauna and for its rich cultural heritage. Chitrada is the birthplace of Mayurbhanj Style of Chhau Dance. Chitrada village is a center place of education in this region.

== Educational Institute in Chitrada ==
1. Chitrada college, Chitrada.

2. Jawahar Vidyapitha, Chitrada (High School)

3. Chitrada Girls High School, Chitrada

4. SSB Regional Institute of Science & Technology, Chitrada, Mayurbhanj
