= Bangriposi Assembly constituency =

Constituency of the Odisha legislative assembly in India

Coordinates: 22.15°N 86.54°E

Bangriposi
- Constituency No. 29 for the Odisha Legislative Assembly

Constituency details
- Country: India
- Region: East India
- State: Odisha
- Division: Central Division
- District: Mayurbhanj
- Lok Sabha constituency: Mayurbhanj
- Established: 1977
- Total electors: 2,24,301 (Note: as on 2024) (Note: as data published by election commission)
- Reservation: ST

Member of Legislative Assembly
- 17th Odisha Legislative Assembly
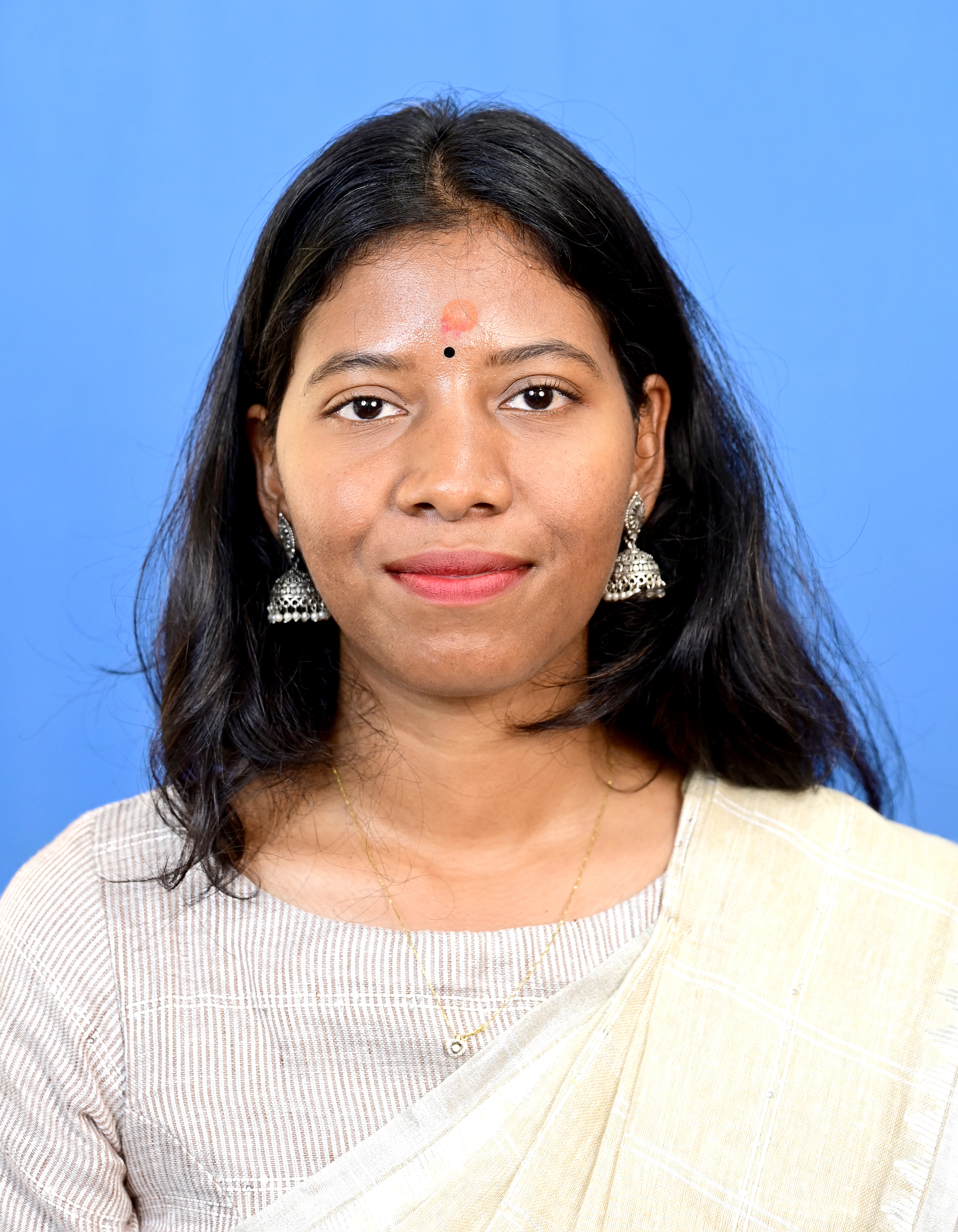
- Incumbent Sanjali Murmu
- Party: Bharatiya Janata Party
- Elected year: 2024

Bangriposi is a Vidhan Sabha constituency of Mayurbhanj district, Odisha.

Area of this constituency includes Bangriposi block, Shamakhunta block and Kuliana block.

== Elected members ==
Vote share of winning candidates
2024	49.94%
2019	42.91%
2014	40.64%
2009	36.13%
2004	22.46%
2000	24.16%
1995	29.98%
1990	28.43%
1985	37.17%
1980	64.63%
1977	48.44%

Since its formation in 1951, 18 elections were held till date including one bypoll in 1964.

List of members elected from Bangriposi constituency are:

Year	Portrait	Member	Party
2024		Sanjali Murmu	Bharatiya Janata Party
2019		Sudam Marndi	Biju Janata Dal
2014		Sudam Marndi	Biju Janata Dal
2009		Sarojini Hembram	Biju Janata Dal
2004		Chaitanya Prasad Majhi	Biju Janata Dal
2000		Purusottam Naik	Independent politician
1995		Ajen Murmu	Jharkhand Mukti Morcha
1990		Sudam Marndi	Independent politician
1985		Kangoi Singh	Indian National Congress
1980		Kangoi Singh	Indian National Congress (I)
1977		Purusottam Naik	Janata Party
1974		Rudramohan Das	Communist Party of India
1971		Radhamohan Nayak	Swatantra Party
1967		Radhamohan Nayak	Swatantra Party
1964 (bypoll) (Note: Death of Ishwar Chandra Nayak)	-	Prasanna Kumar Das (Note: Won Uncontested)	Indian National Congress
1961	-	Ishwar Chandra Nayak	Indian National Congress
1957		Radhamohan Nayak	Ganatantra Parishad
1951		Jadav Majhi	Indian National Congress

== Election results ==
=== 2024 ===
Voting were held on 1st June 2024 in 4th phase of Odisha Assembly Election & 7th phase of Indian General Election. Counting of votes was on 4th June 2024. In 2024 election, Bharatiya Janata Party candidate Sanjali Murmu defeated Biju Janata Dal candidate Ranjita Marandi by a margin of 34,476 votes.

2024 Odisha Vidhan Sabha Election Bangriposi
Party	Candidate	Votes	%	±%
BJP	Sanjali Murmu	87,801	49.94	
BJD	Ranjita Marandi	53,325	30.33	
INC	Murali Dhar Naik	13,085	7.44	
NOTA	None of the above	628	0.36	
Majority		34,476	19.61	
Turnout		1,75,820	78.30	
BJP gain from BJD				

=== 2019 ===
In 2019 election, Biju Janata Dal candidate Sudam Marndi defeated Bharatiya Janata Party candidate Sugda Murmu by a margin of 11,844 votes.

2019 Odisha Legislative Assembly election, Bangriposi
Party	Candidate	Votes	%	±%
BJD	Sudam Marndi	72,050	42.91	▲2.27
BJP	Sugda Murmu	60,206	35.86	▲15.75
JMM	Fagu Hansdah	15,908	9.47	▼5.78
None of the Above	None of the Above	2,027	1.21	
Majority		11,844	7.05	
Turnout		1,67,914	79.7	
BJD hold				

=== 2014 ===
In 2014 election, Biju Janata Dal candidate Sudam Marndi defeated Bharatiya Janata Party candidate Purusotam Naik by a margin of 31,529 votes.

2014 Odisha Legislative Assembly election, Bangriposi
Party	Candidate	Votes	%	±%
BJD	Sudam Marndi	62,406	40.46	
BJP	Purusotam Naik	30,877	20.11	
INC	Sundar Mohan Singh	26,327	17.15	
JMM	Ajen Murmu	23,411	15.25	
None of the Above	None of the Above	2,508	1.63	
Majority		31,529	20.35	
Turnout		1,53,544	84.1	
BJD hold				

=== 2009 ===
In 2009 election, Biju Janata Dal candidate Sarojini Hembram defeated Jharkhand Mukti Morcha candidate Sudam Marndi by a margin of 6,331 votes.

2009 Odisha Legislative Assembly election, Bangriposi
Party	Candidate	Votes	%	±%
BJD	Sarojini Hembram	48,382	36.13	
JMM	Sudam Marndi	37,440	30.91	
BJP	Setanath Kisku	15,262	12.60	
INC	Gouri Naik	12,131	10.01	
Majority		6,331	5.23 (Note: %of total valid votes)	
Turnout		1,21,285	76.75	
BJD hold				
