= Narla =

Coordinates: 20°03′N 83°23′E

Narla is a town in Narla Tehsil in Kalahandi district in the Indian state of Odisha. This town is maintaining 29 km distance from its district main city Bhawanipatna and 430 km far from its state capital Bhubaneswar.

The current MLA from Narla Assembly Constituency is someone from Biju Janta Dal, who won the seat in state elections in 2024 is Smt. Manorama Mohanty. Dhiraj Kumar Patra is the Tehsilsar.

Narla is part of Kalahandi (Lok Sabha constituency). There are several transport facilities available like buses and a railway station on Narla Road. The nearest town to the north is Raipur and Vishakha Patnam to the south.

Narla is a developing city and declared NAC. Literacy is going up. Several companies have been established here. Indian Railway has planned to establish a wagon factory here at Bomak. People often prefer to travel different parts of the country for livelihood. Many crops are grown here, such as rice, dal, sugar cane and vegetables.

Education is the vital developing factor of Narla, as of now it has two High schools, one degree college, many govt. Schools and private Hindi and English medium schools like Mountain public school, and Pacific public school. JNV, Narla is the CBSE school which is the true factor for educational development. A New OAV (Odisha Adarsh Vidyalaya) school has been established near JNV, Narla.

Tourist places of Narla include Bhilat Shiv temple and Asurgarh.
