= List of state highways in Odisha =

The following is a list of state highways in Odisha, India.

State Highway No.	Route	Passes through - District(s)	Length (in km)
Urvish rana Sex	Phulbani–Nayagarh-Khurdha		
SH 03	Nuapada–Padmapur-Sohela		
SH 04	Rayagada–Laxshmipur-Koraput		
SH 05	Jaykaypur–Muniguda-Tumudibandha		
SH 06	Muniguda-Bhawanipatna		
SH 6A	Ramapur–SH06		
SH Sex			
SH 7A	NH 157-Kalinga Ghati–G. Udayagiri-Raikia–Baliguda-NH 59		
SH 9(NH-316A)	Jagatpur - Salepur - Pattamundai - Chandabali- Bhadrak		
SH 10A	Rourkela-Sundargarh–Jharsuguda-Sambalpur-Bargarh-Nuapada-Nabarangpur-Kotpad Koraput	Koraput Rourkela	650 Kilometer
SH 12	Kandarpur-Paradeep	Cuttack-Jagatsinghpur	72 Kilometre
SH 14	Boudh–Banigucha		
SH 15	Sonepur–Sambalpur		
SH 16	Bhawanipatna–Khariar		
SH 17	SH04–Padmapur-Berhampur		
SH 21	NH 157-Bhanjanagar–Karsing-SH33		
SH 24	Boudh–Redhakhol-Deogarh-Kochinda-Sundargarh-Talsara		
SH 25	NH 201–Motu-Malkangiri-Jeypore		
SH 29	NH 5–Digapahandi-NH59		
SH 30	Bellaguntha – Kabisuryanagar – Khollikote		79 Kilometer
SH 35	National Highway 16-Bhadrak, Aradi	Bhadrak	38 K.M.
SH 36	NH 59-Surada-Chhatrapur-NH 16		
SH 37	NH 157-Bhanjanagar–Daspalla-NH 57		
SH 39	NH 201–Dabugaon-Umerkote-Kandagaon		
SH 40	Umerkote–Raighar-Kundei		
SH 41	Baligud–Sonepur		
SH 42	SH 16-Sindhekela–Kantabanji-Patnagarh-Bolangir		
SH 44	Bhawanipatna–Tikiri		
SH 45	Jaykaypur–Lanjigarh		
SH 46	Bissam Cuttack–SH 04		
SH 47	Chitrakonda–Balimela-SH25		
SH 48	Koraput–Boriguma		
SH 49	Karanjia–Rairangpur	Rairangpur Jashipur Karanjia Dhenkikote Road.(Karanjia Bazar Portion Road)	
SH 50	Baripada–Rairangpur	Baripada Bisoi Rairangpur Bahalda	
SH 51	Lakshmipur–Odisha-Andhra Border		
SH 52	Dharamgarh–NH 201-Junagarh		
SH 53	National Highway 16 -Bhadrak- Bonth-Anandapur-Karanjia	Bhadrak, Kendujhar, Mayurbhanj	121 K.M.
SH 54	NH 6–SH55		
SH 55	SH54–Barpali-Binka Road-Sonepur Road		
SH 57	Anantapur-NH 16–Soro-Kupari-Agarpada. NH-16 - Jaleswar- Digha (NH-316A)	Balasore, Bhadrak, Kendujhar	40.1 K.M. 40 K.M.
SH 60	Phulnakhara – Adaspur - Niali – Charichhak – Gop	Cuttack, Khordha, Puri	54 K.M.

== See also ==
- Biju Expressway
