= Kandhamal turmeric =

Type of Turmeric variety from Odisha, India

Kandhamal Haladi
- Geographical indication
- Description: Kandhamal Haladi is a turmeric variety cultivated in Odisha
- Type: Turmeric
- Area: Kandhamal
- Country: India
- Registered: 1 April 2019
- Official website: ipindia.gov.in

Kandhamal Haladi is an indigenous variety of turmeric mainly grown in the Indian State of Odisha. It is a common and widely cultivated crop in the Khajuripada, Phulbani, Phiringia, Tikabali, Chakapad, G.Udayagiri, Raikia, K. Nuagaon, Baliguda, Tumudibandha, Kotagarh and Daringbadi tehsils of the Kandhamal district, mainly by the indigenous Kondh community.

Under its Geographical Indication tag, it is referred to as "Kandhamal Haladi".

== Name ==
Kandhamal Haladi is a prized crop in Kandhamal and so named after the district. The word "Haladi" means "Turmeric" in the state language of Odia.

== Description ==
According to L.S.S. O'Malley's "Annual District Gazetteers" (1908), turmeric has been cultivated by tribal farmers in the region since ancient times. Cultivated by over 60,000 families (roughly 50% of the district's population), Kandhamal Haldi is inherently organic. Its distinctive golden yellow color sets it apart from other varieties. This resilient crop thrives in adverse climatic conditions, offering low-risk, high-productivity farming. Rich in special medicinal values, Kandhamal turmeric boasts immense potential for medicinal and industrial applications. It is a prized ingredient in various industries due to its exceptional antimicrobial and anti-inflammatory properties. It's used to make beauty soap, cream, and medicinal soap, while its anti-carcinogenic qualities make it a valuable component in pharmaceuticals, with curcumin and oleoresin extracts used to create medicines and ointments. Additionally, the leaves of this turmeric are used in traditional Odia cuisine, particularly in "Enduri Pitha", a local dish that showcases their distinct pungent flavor and aroma. Kandhamal is a significant turmeric producer, cultivating the crop on 13,600 hectares of land annually, yielding around 24,000 metric tonnes of dry turmeric. A substantial portion, approximately 1,400-1,500 metric tonnes, is exported globally to countries including Europe, the US, UK, Australia, Japan and Korea.

== Geographical indication ==
It was awarded the Geographical Indication (GI) status tag from the Geographical Indications Registry, under the Union Government of India, on 1 April 2019 valid upto 10 January 2028.

Kandhamal Apex Spices Association for Marketing (KASAM) from Kandhamal, proposed the GI registration of Kandhamal Haladi. After filing the application in January 2018, the turmeric was granted the GI tag in 2019 by the Geographical Indications Registry in Chennai, making the name "Kandhamal Haladi" exclusive to the turmeric grown in the region. It thus became the first turmeric variety from Odisha and the 17th type of goods from Odisha to earn the GI tag.

The prestigious GI tag, awarded by the GI registry, certifies that a product possesses distinct qualities, adheres to traditional production methods, and has earned a reputation rooted in its geographical origin.

== See also ==
- Erode Turmeric
- Sangli turmeric
- Vasmat Haldi
- Waigaon turmeric
- Lakadong turmeric
