= Laxmipur =

Laxmipur may refer to:

- Lakshmipur District, Bangladesh
  - Lakshmipur Sadar Upazila
- Laxmipur, Dang Deokhuri, Nepal
- Laxmipur, Jhapa, Nepal
- Laxmipur, Mahakali, Nepal
- Laxmipur, Narayani, Nepal
- Laxmipur, Salyan, Nepal
- Laxmipur (Odisha Vidhan Sabha constituency), India
- Laxmipur, Narayanpet district, Telangana, India
- Lakshmipur, Jamui, Jamui district, Bihar
- Lakshmipur, Uttar Pradesh

== See also ==
- Lakshmipur (disambiguation)
