= State Highway 7 (Odisha) =

State highway in Odisha, India

Coordinates: 20°2′25.58″N 84°29′52.94″E

Odisha State Highway 7 is a state highway in the state of Odisha, India.

The highway connects NH-157 and NH-59, passing through Kalinga Ghati, Udayagiri, Raikia and Baliguda.
