= Itishree Murder Case =

The murder of Itishree Pradhan, a non-formal teacher in the remote village of Tikiri under the Kashipur Block in Rayagada district in the Indian state of Odisha generated nationwide uproar. It remains one of the rare cases where the Central Bureau of Investigation (CBI) was unable to trace the primary assailant. Although opposition politicians from national parties, such as the Indian National Congress and the Bharatiya Janata Party, alleged political involvement by the Biju Janata Dal (BJD), no political parties were proven to be involved.

== Background ==
According to the criminal case records (C.T. No. 48 of 2014, Itishree Pradhan, a contracted government teacher at the Project U.P. School in Tikiri, was harassed by Netrananda Dandosena, the Sub-Inspector of Schools for the Kashipur Block and former school headmaster. Pradhan filed written complaints against Dandosena and his family members; however, no immediate action was taken. Despite her appeals to various administrative bodies and organizations, the harassment continued as Dandosena pressured her to withdraw the complaints.

On October 27, 2013, an unidentified individual entered Pradhan's room, demanding she drop the cases. When she refused, the assailant poured kerosene over her and lit her on fire. Pradhan suffered severe burns and was taken to the Primary Health Centre (PHC) in Tikiri, where the medical officer administered preliminary treatment and recorded her dying declaration. She was subsequently transferred to the District Headquarters Hospital, and later to Seven Hills Hospital in Visakhapatnam, where she succumbed to her injuries on November 1. A second dying declaration was recorded by the Tahasildar-cum-Executive Magistrate of Rayagada during her treatment.

== Investigation ==
Following widespread media coverage, the local administration faced significant public criticism for its perceived inaction. In response, the state government directed the Crime Branch of the Criminal Investigation Department (CID-CB) to investigate the matter. Netrananda Dandosena was subsequently charged and stood trial. Following a public interest litigation filed by law graduate Sudeepta Lenka, the Supreme Court of India ordered a further investigation by the CBI to identify and apprehend the unknown assailant.

== Judgment ==
On April 26, 2016, the trial judge found Dandosena guilty of criminal conspiracy to commit murder. The court noted that the convict deserved exemplary punishment to serve as a deterrent against similar conspiracies, and sentenced him to life imprisonment.
