= Lakadong turmeric =

Type of Turmeric variety from Meghalaya, India

- Geographical indication
- Description: Lakadong turmeric is a Turmeric variety cultivated in Meghalaya
- Type: Turmeric
- Area: Lakadong village and it's neighbouring villages
- Country: India
- Registered: 30 March 2024
- Official website: ipindia.gov.in

Lakadong turmeric is a variety of turmeric mainly grown in the Indian state of Meghalaya. It is a common and widely cultivated crop in the Lakadong area of the Jaintia Hills districts. Approximately 14,000 farmers from 43 villages in the Lakadong area cultivate this variety of turmeric on 1,753 hectares of land.

Under its Geographical Indication tag, it is referred to as "Lakadong Turmeric".

== Name ==
The name "Lakadong" refers to the village of cultivation, where it is the major produce. "Shynrai Lakadong" in Khasi language and "Chyrmit Lakadong" in Pnar language are the local names for Lakadong turmeric.

== Description ==
Trinity Saioo, a Lakadong agriculturist and former school teacher, received the prestigious Padma Shri award from the Government of India in 2021 for promoting the cultivation of Lakadong turmeric among farmers in the state. Lakadong turmeric is considered one of the world's best varieties with a high curcumin content of 6.8-7.5% and a darker color. It is grown organically without fertilizers.

== Photo Gallery ==
Actual photos from Trinity Saioo - the original applicant for the GI Tag registration.

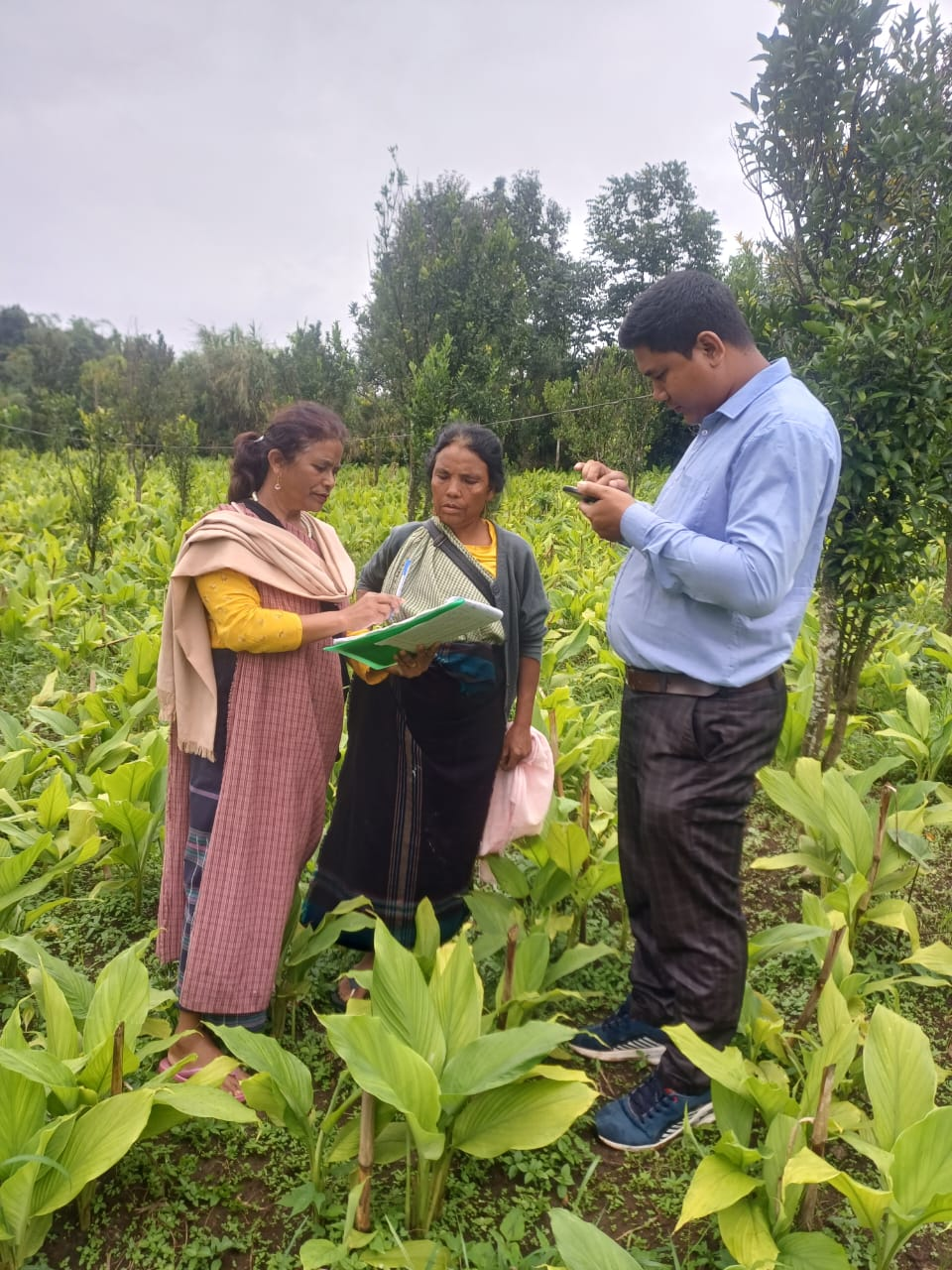
Inspection for organic certification for Lakadong Turmeric In presence of Trinity Saioo

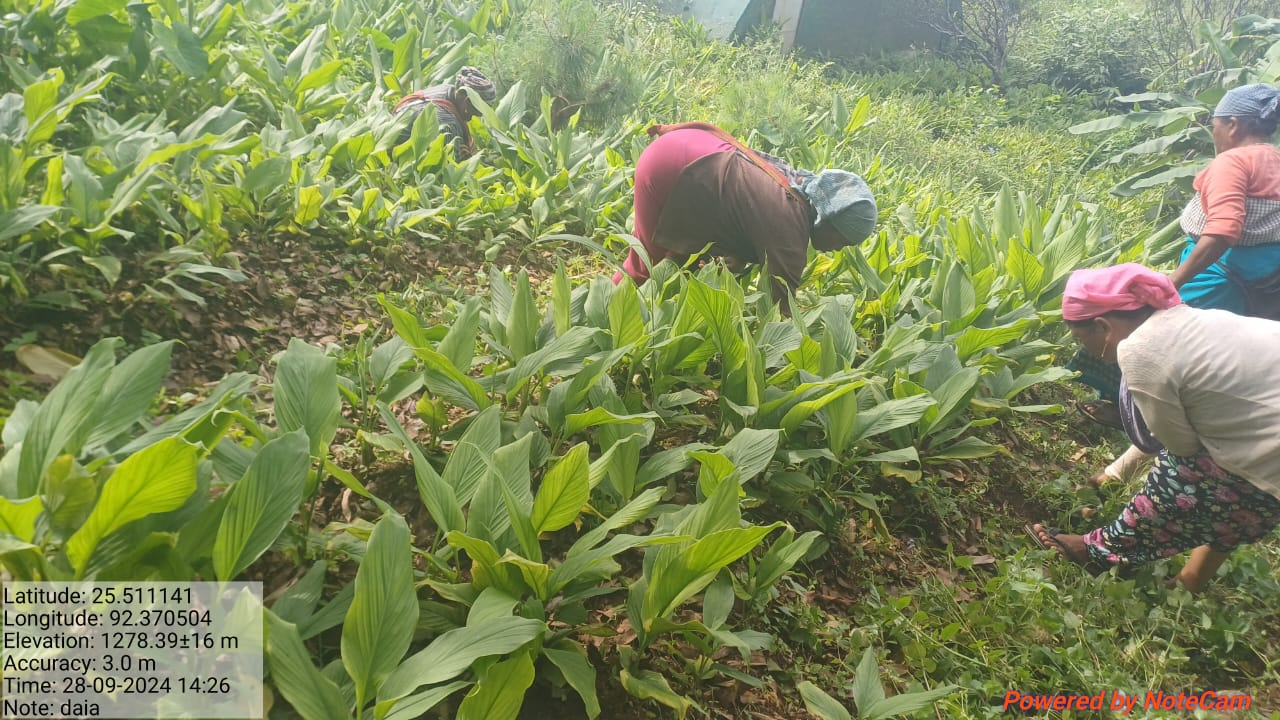
Lakadong Turmeric Weeding (another photo)

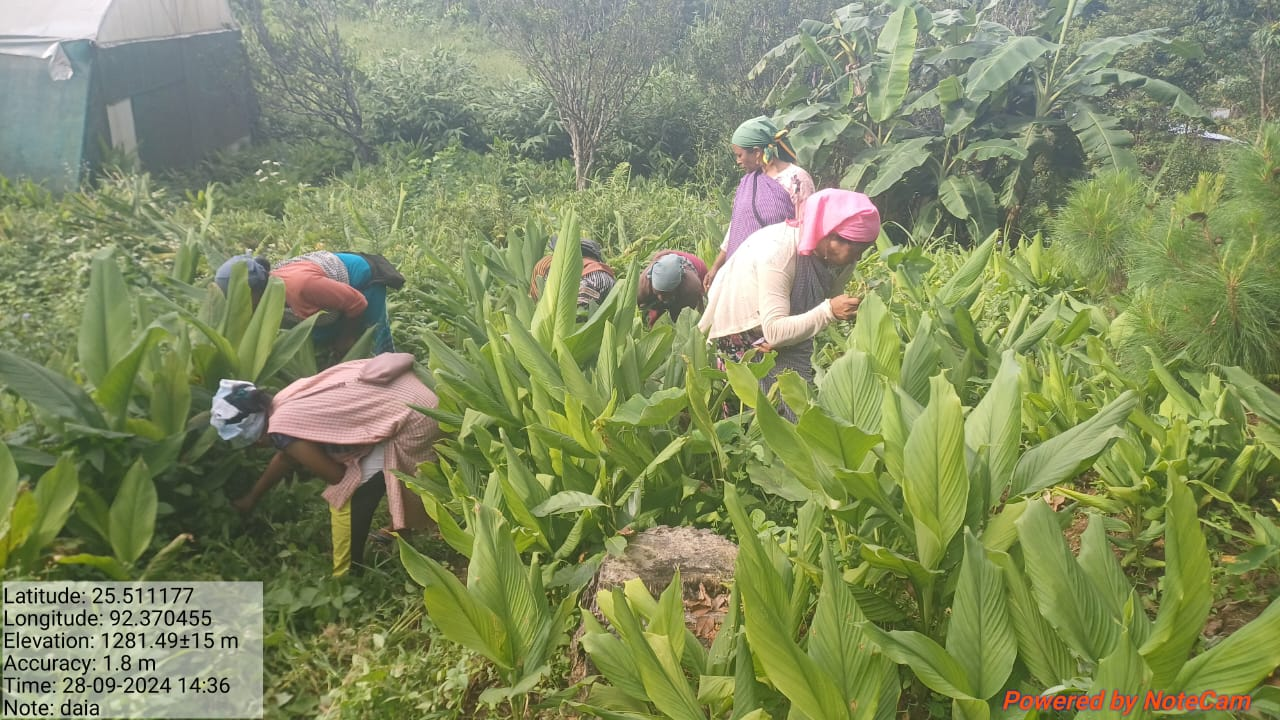
Lakadong Turmeric Weeding time

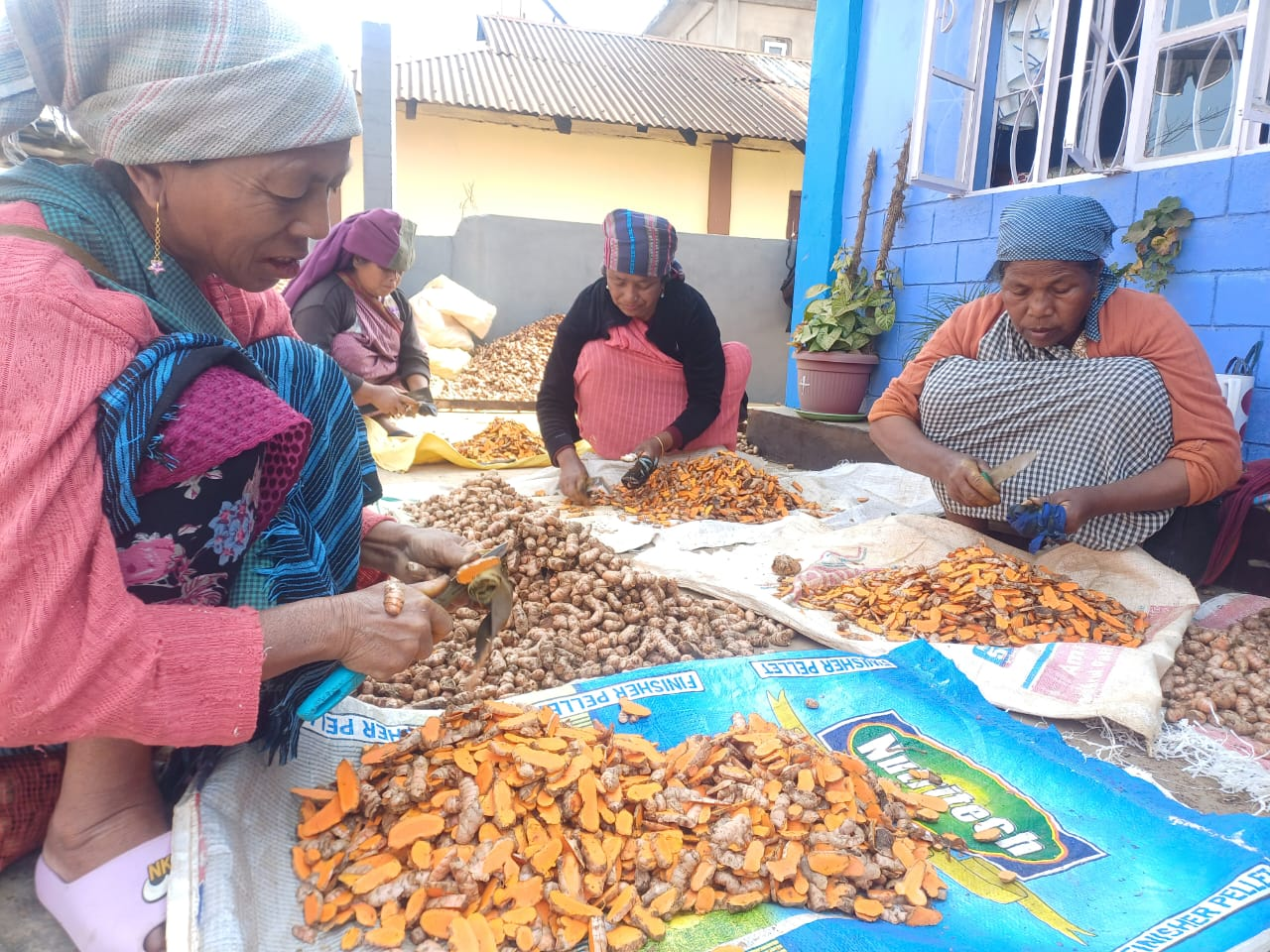
Lakadong Turmeric slicing activity

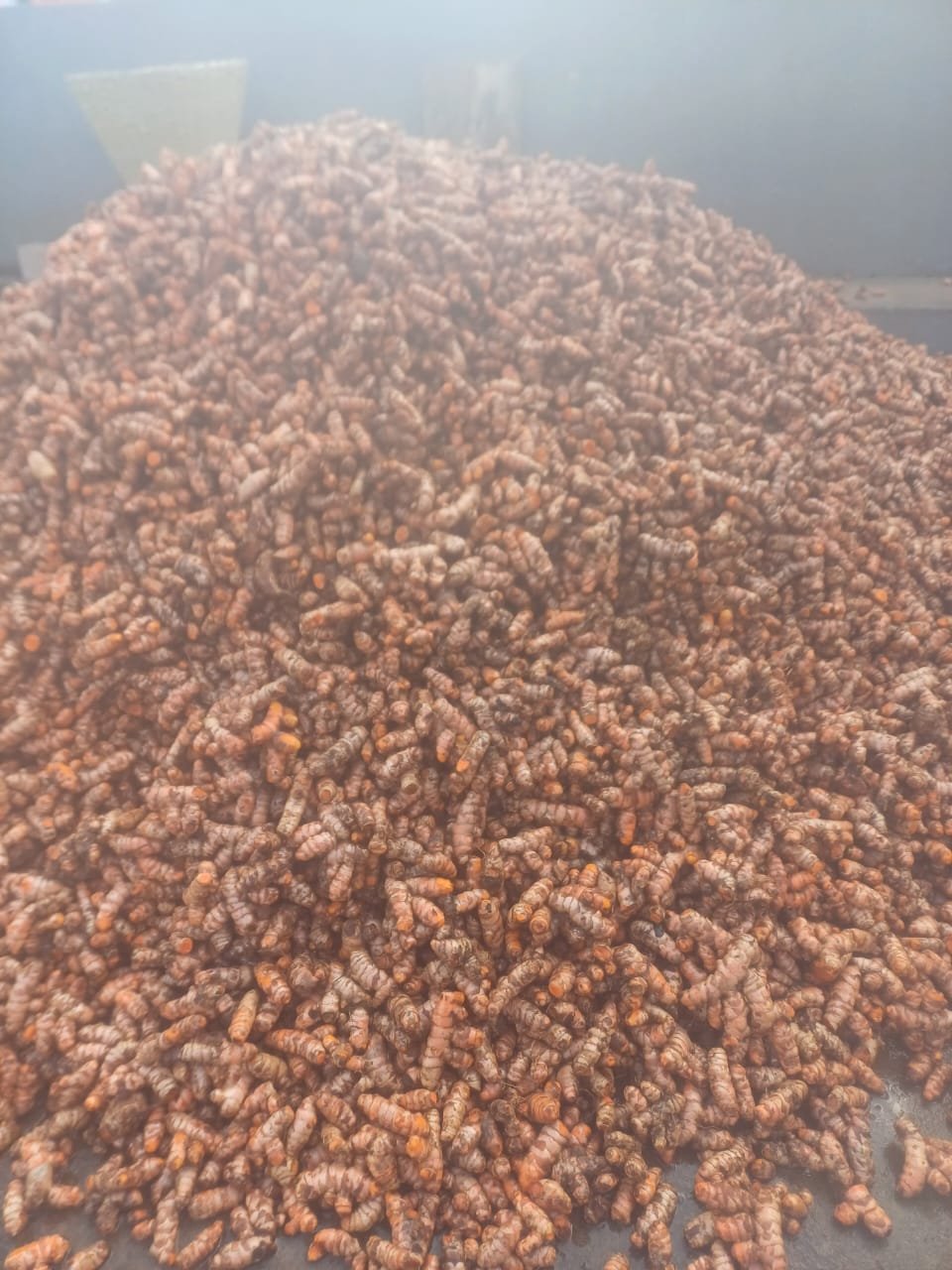
Lakadong Turmeric Fingers ready for slicing

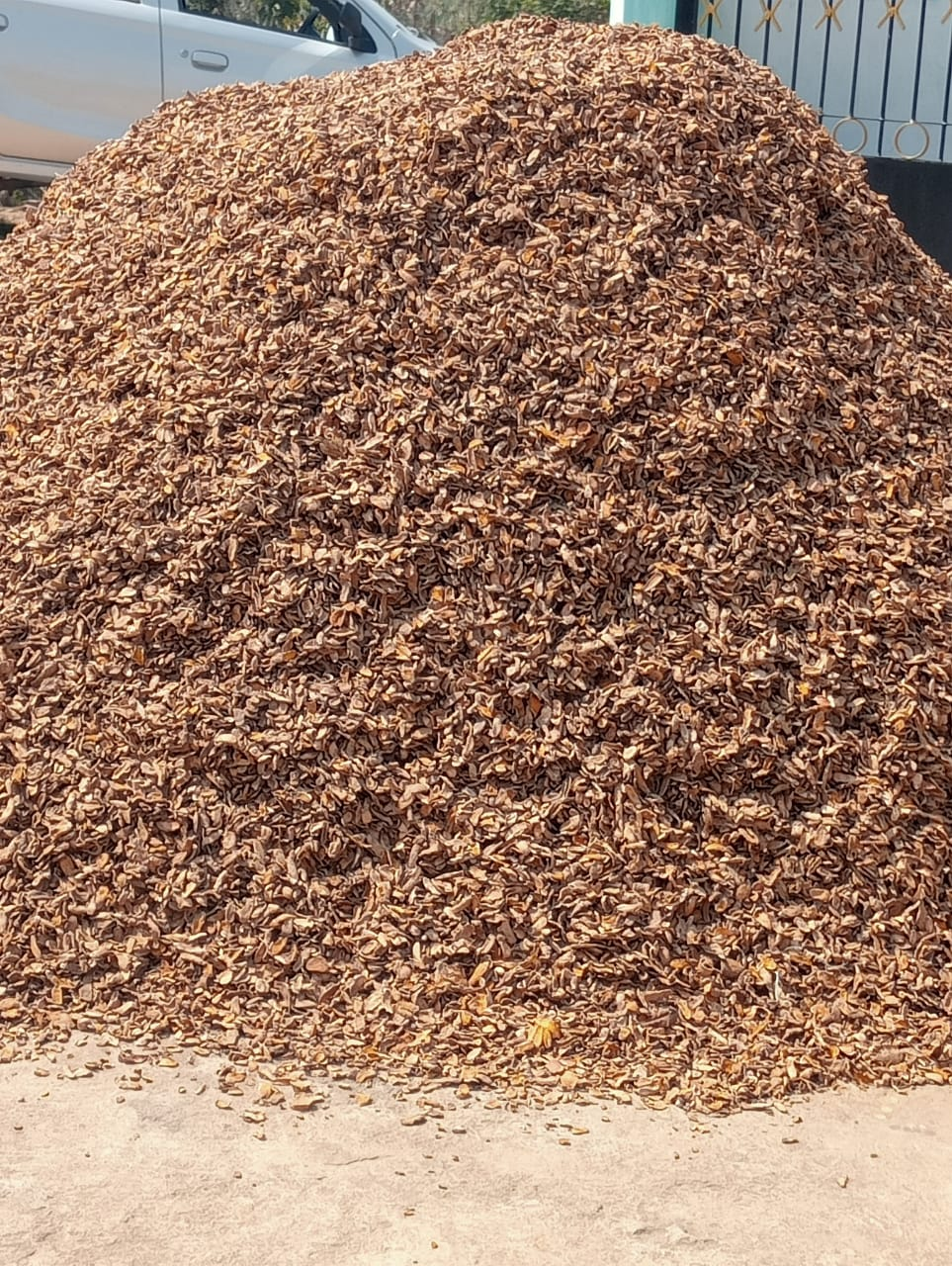
Lakadong Turmeric Dry chip slices

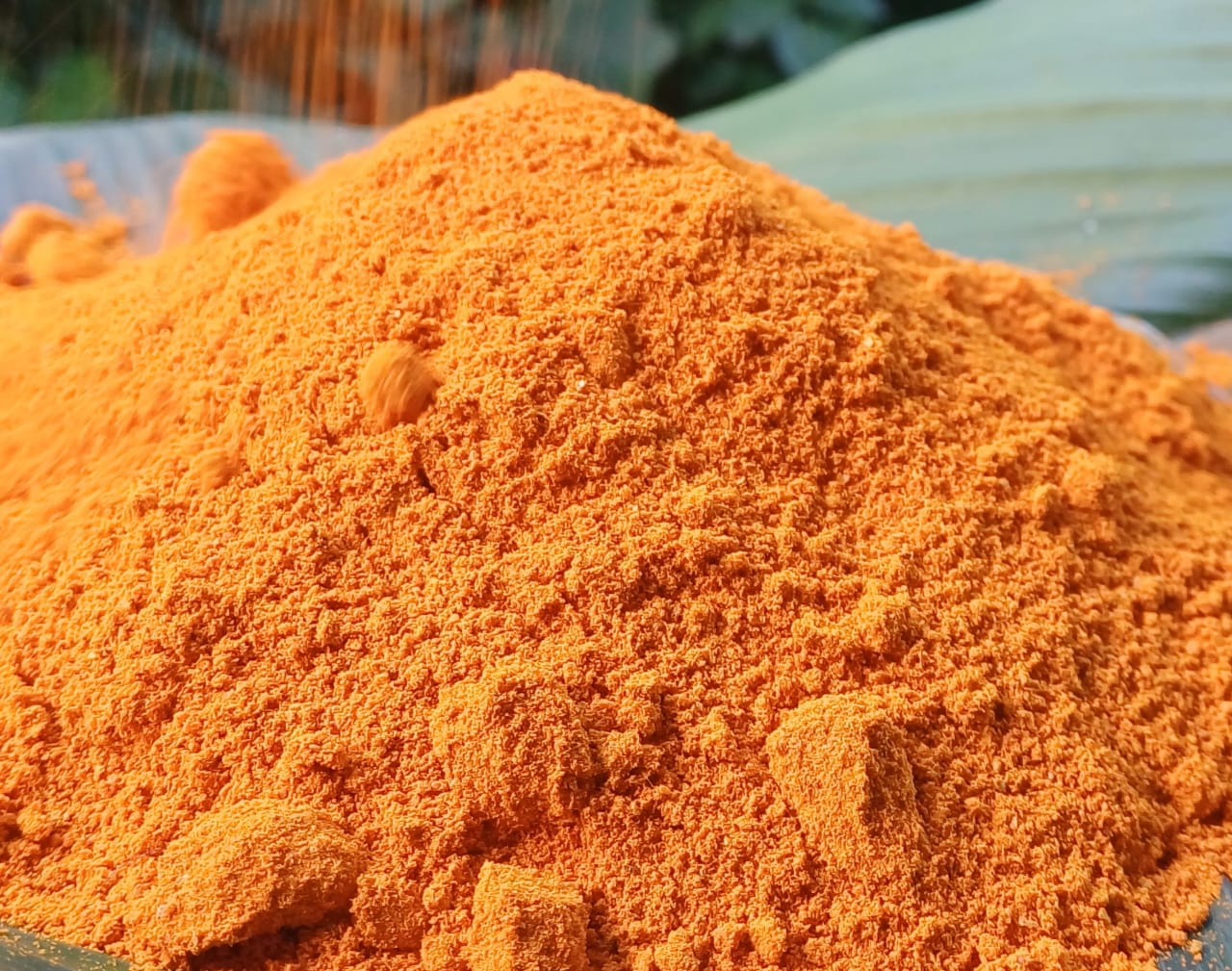
Lakadong Turmeric Powder final product

== Geographical indication ==
It was awarded the Geographical Indication (GI) status tag from the Geographical Indications Registry, under the Union Government of India, on 30 March 2024 valid upto 14 February 2031.

Lakadong Turmeric Cooperative Union Limited from Jowai, proposed the GI registration of Lakadong turmeric. After filing the application in February 2021, the turmeric was granted the GI tag in 2024 by the Geographical Indication Registry in Chennai, making the name "Lakadong turmeric" exclusive to the turmeric grown in the region. It thus became the first turmeric variety from Meghalaya and the 3rd type of goods from Meghalaya to earn the GI tag.

The prestigious GI tag, awarded by the GI registry, certifies that a product possesses distinct qualities, adheres to traditional production methods, and has earned a reputation rooted in its geographical origin.

== See also ==
- Erode Turmeric
- Sangli turmeric
- Vasmat Haldi
- Waigaon turmeric
- Kandhamal Haladi
