= Biju Expressway =

Road in Odisha, India

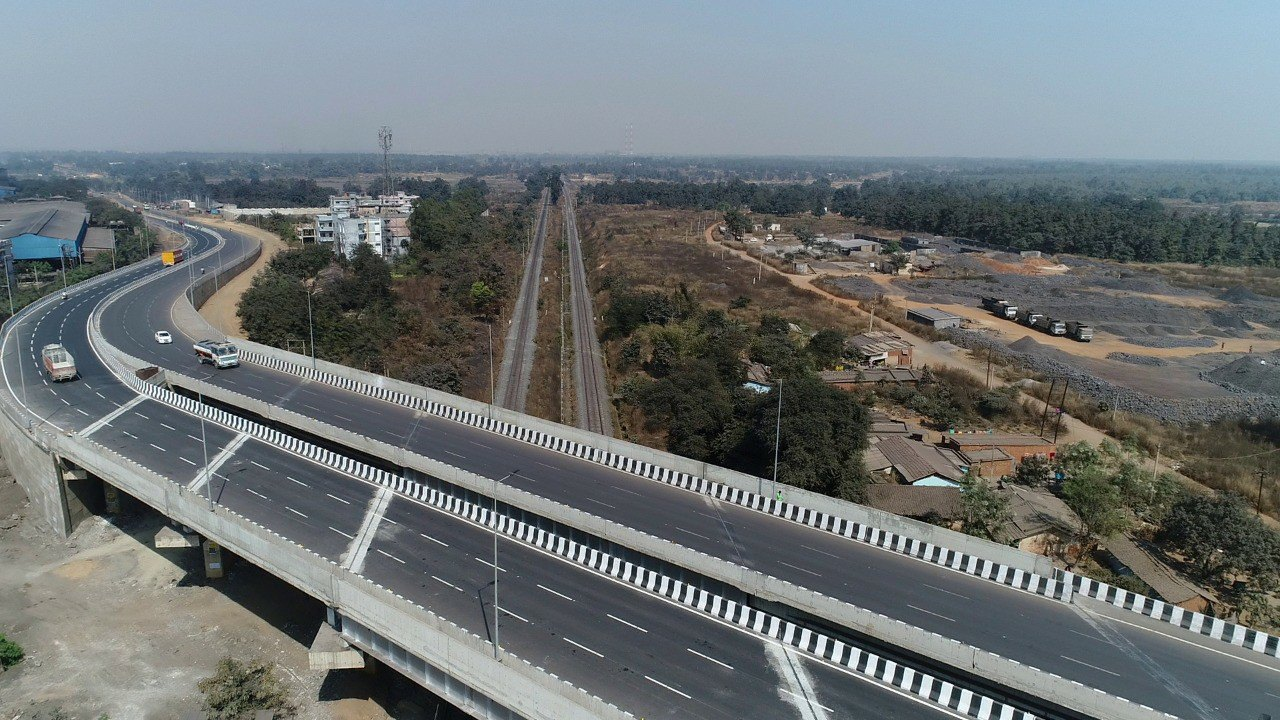

Route information
- Length: 650 km (400 mi)

Major junctions
- From: Chandili, Koraput district
- To: Rourkela

Location
- Country: India
- State: Odisha

Highway system
- Roads in India; Expressways; National; State; Asian; State Highways in Odisha

Biju Expressway is a State Expressway in the state of Odisha, with a total length of 650 km. It starts at Chandili (border village in Koraput district) and goes on to touch border towns/market centres such as Kotpad, Boriguma, Nabarangpur, Papadahandi, Ambapani, Godbhanja, Dharmagarh, Sinapalli, Bhella, Nuapada, Paikamal, Padampur, Sohela, Bargarh, Sambalpur, Jharsuguda, Sundargarh before ending at Rourkela. The main expressway is between Vedvyas and Sambalpur. The Biju Expressway contains three toll gates. The first one is 6 km before Rajgangpur Bypass.The second tollgate is at Masunikani and the third gate is at Rengali. The maximum capable speed limit of L&T SRTL (Larsen & Toubro Sambalpur Rourkela Tollway Limited) is 160 km/h between the 163 km stretch from Vedvyas to Rengali. The current Odisha Government has numbered this Expressway as National Highway 126B(NH126B), Auxiliary highway of NH26 as it runs nearly parallel to NH26. Biju Expressway has the distinction of being the Subsidiary Highway longer than the Main National Highway. Main NH26 covers 555 kilometres (345 mi) distance, Biju Expressway as NH126B runs for 650 kilometres (400 mi) distance.

== Important Landmarks ==
- SH-10, Biju Expressway (ବିଜୁ ଏକ୍ସପ୍ରେସୱେ)
- Vedvyas (ବେଦବ୍ୟାସ)
- Kansbahal (କାଂଶବାହାଲ)
- Kutra (କୁତ୍ରା)
- Tudalaga (ତୁଡାଲଗା)
- Bargaon (ବଡ଼ଗାଁ)
- Jarangloi (ଜରଙ୍ଗଲୋଇ)
- Karamdihi (କରମଡ଼଼ିହି)
- Sundargarh (ସୁନ୍ଦରଗଡ)
- Kirei (କିରେଇ)
- Jharsuguda Bypass (ଝାରସୁଗୁଡା ବାଇପାସ)
- Badmal (ବଡ଼ମାଲ)
- Rengali (ରେଙ୍ଗାଲି)
- Ainthapali Sambalpur (ଅଇଁଠାପାଲି ସମ୍ବଲପୁର)
- Bargarh (ବରଗଡ଼)
- Sohela (ସୋହେଲା)
- SH-03 Biju Expressway (ବିଜୁ ଏକ୍ସପ୍ରେସୱେ)
- Padampur (ପଦ୍ମପୁର)
- Paikmal (ପାଇକମାଲ)
- Nuapada (ନୂଆପଡା)

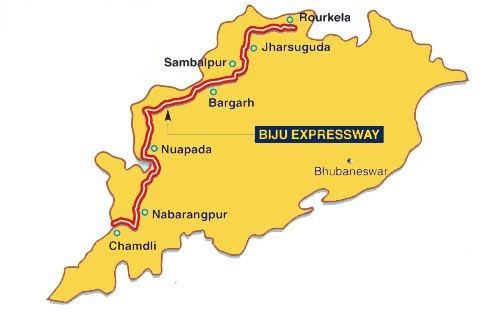
Proposed route map of Biju Expressway

The total cost of the project is around ₹3,630 crore. The project will be completed in phased manner, in the first phase of the project, a 256 kilometres (159 mi) long four-lane road will be established by converting an existing road and a further 402 km will be converted into a two-lane road. In the second phase, 258 km of road will be converted into four lanes.

The first phase of the project was completed by December 2017, and the second phase was completed by the end of 2019. Since completion, it has reduce the travel time between the two cities from 12 hrs 45 mins to 9 hrs 45 mins hrs.

308 kilometres (191 mi) of the total length would be converted into the four lane standard while the National Highways Authority of India (NHAI) will further develop another 183 km. The 160 km road from Rourkela to Sambalpur (SH-10) will be converted into four lanes through Public Private Partnership (PPP).

== Status updates ==
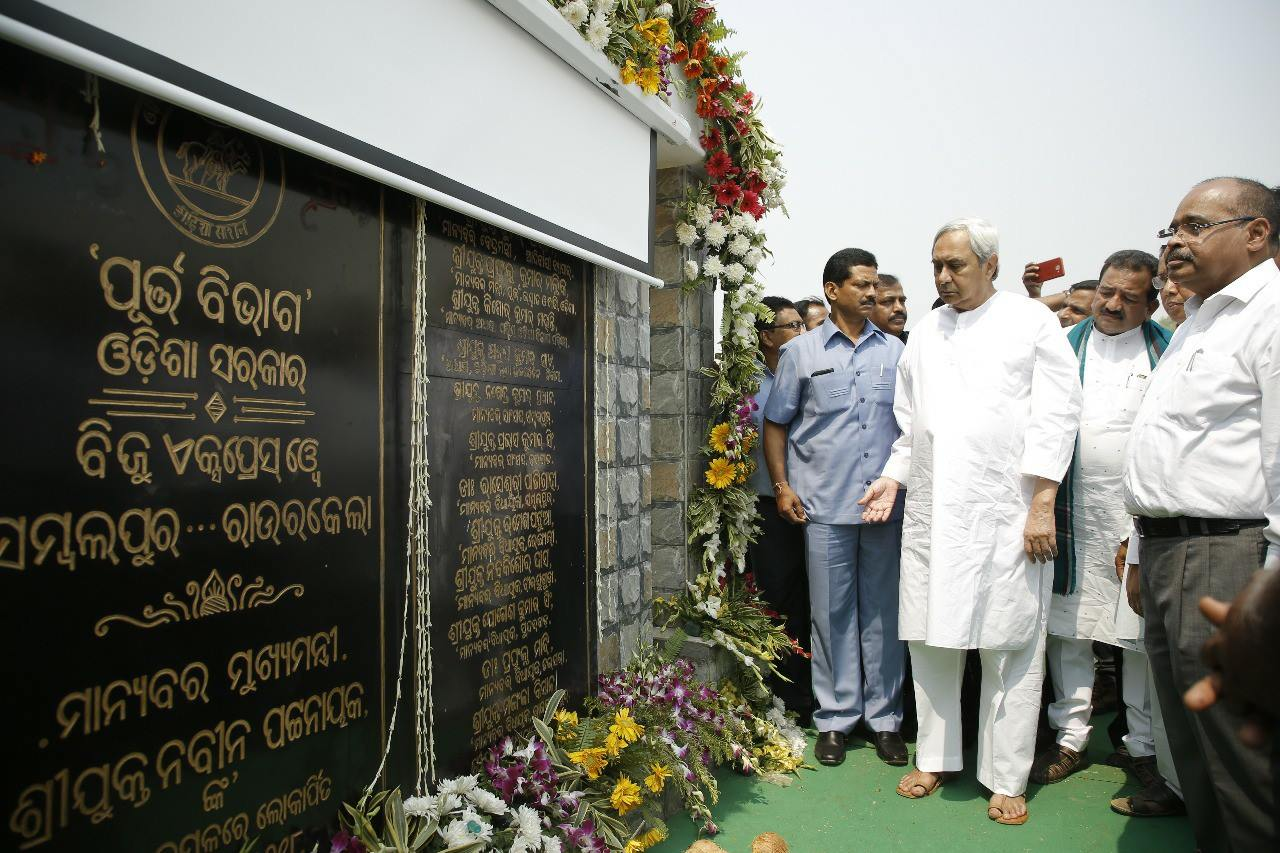
Chief Minister Naveen Patnaik inaugurating Biju Expressway from Rourkela to Sambalpur

Status updates of the 650 kilometres (400 mi)long under construction Biju Expressway. The road will connect Rourkela to Chandili via Sambalpur, Nuapada, out of which the 350 kilometres (220 mi)long Rourkela-Sambalpur-Nuapada section will be 6 lanes wide and the remaining 300 kilometres (190 mi) Nuapada-Chandili section will be 4 lanes wide.

- June 2017: Road from Rourkela to Sambalpur to be completed by December 2017. All sections to be completed by June 2019.
- March 2018: The 163 kilometres (101 mi) long four-lane expressway from Vedvyas to Sambalpur was inaugurated by Chief Minister Naveen Patnaik.
- March 2019: 70% of the total work completed.

== Gallery ==
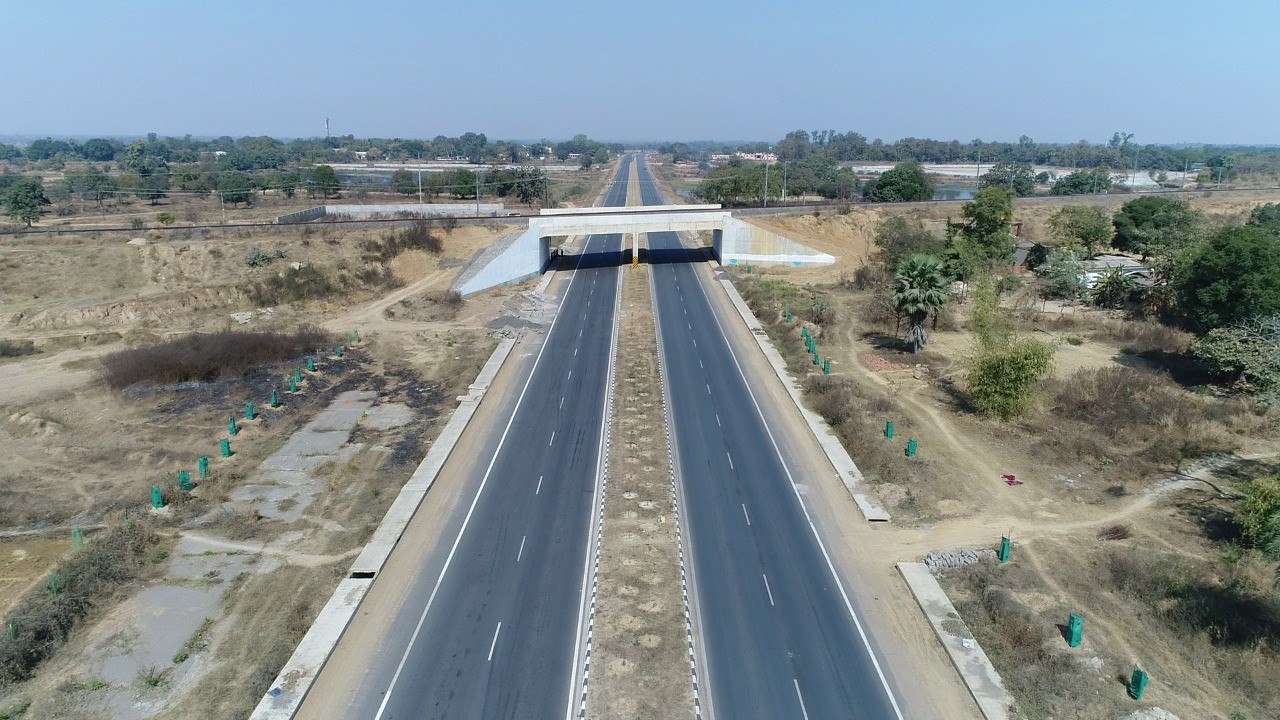
Part of Biju Expressway from Rourkela to Sambalpur

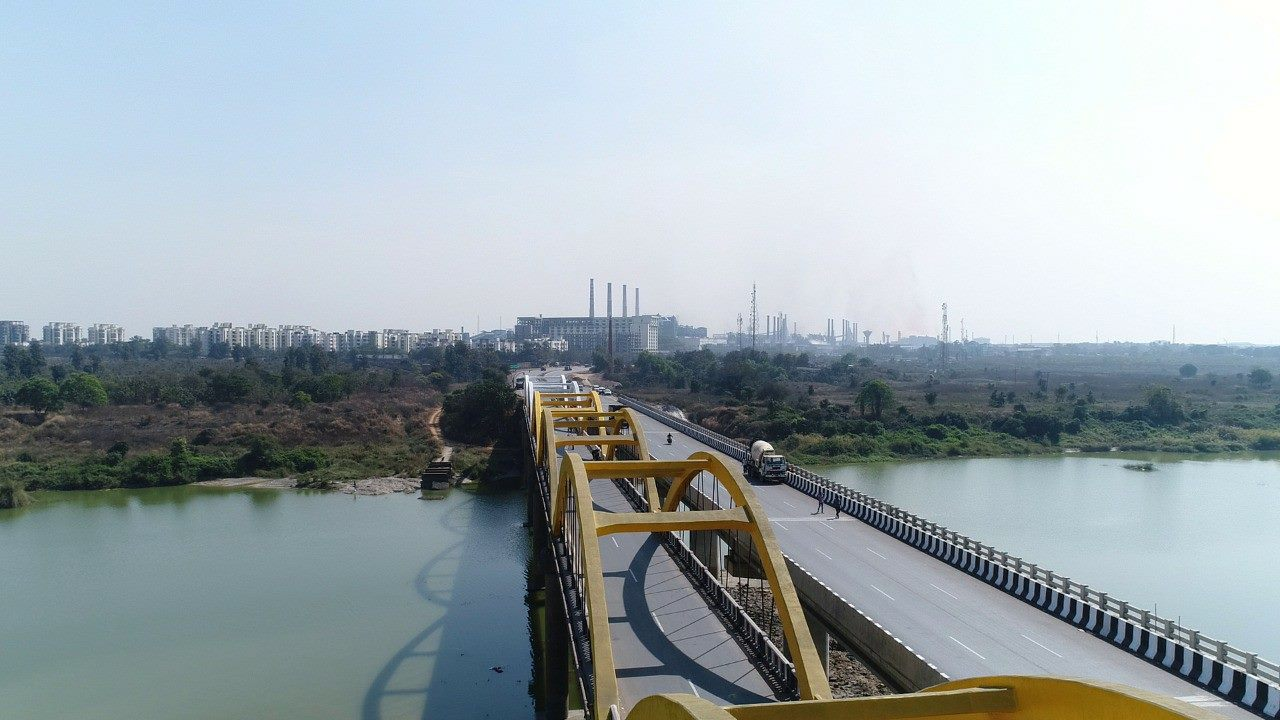
Part of Biju Expressway from Rourkela to Sambalpur

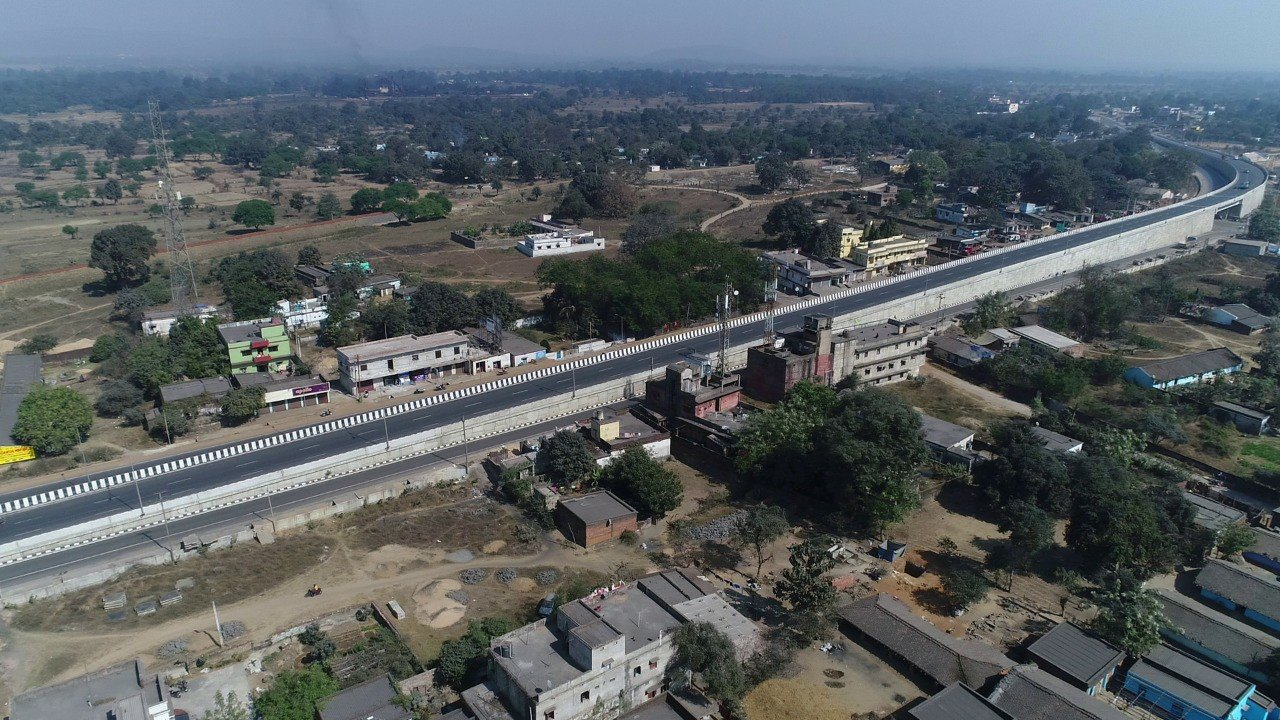
Part of Biju Expressway from Rourkela to Sambalpur
