= Lakshmipur (disambiguation) =

Lakshmipur is a town in Bangladesh.

Lakshmipur also may refer to:

== Bangladesh ==
- Lakshmipur District
  - Lakshmipur Sadar Upazila

== India ==
- Lakshmipur, Orissa
- Lakshmipuram, Theni, Tamil Nadu
- Lakshmipuram, Chennai, Tamil Nadu
- Lakshmipuram Palace, the royal palace of the Parappanad royal families at Changanassery
- Lakshmipuram, Mysore, a neighborhood in Mysore, Karnataka
- Laxmipuram, Srikakulam, Andhra Pradesh

== Nepal ==
- Lakshmipur Patari
- Lakshmipur, Dang
