= Panasa =

- Village
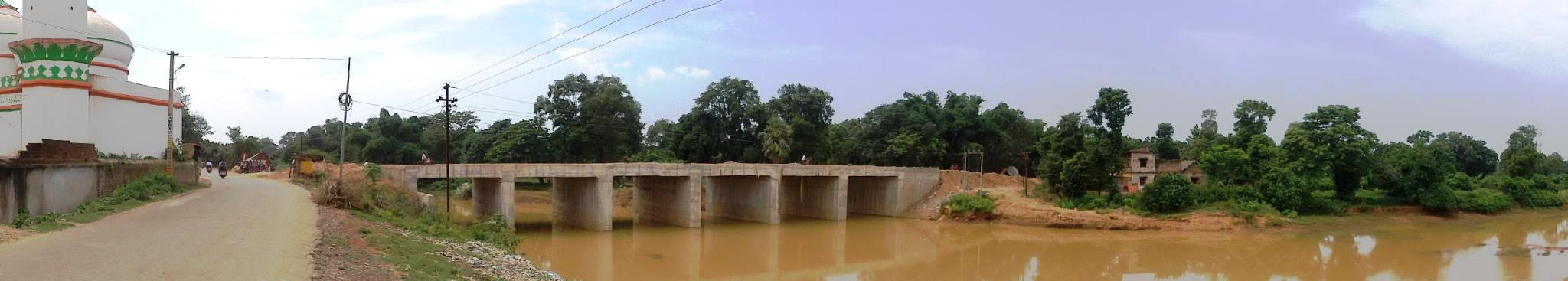
- Bridge Connecting Jajpur Town and Panasa

- Location of Panasa in Odisha, India
- Coordinates: 20°51′54″N 86°18′58″E
- Country: India
- State: Odisha
- District: Jajpur
- Elevation: 26 m (85 ft)

Population (Census 2011)
  - Total: 2,729
- Time zone: UTC+5:30 (IST)
- PIN: 755007
- Telephone code: 06728
- Vehicle registration: OD-34
- Nearest City: Jajpur
- Literacy: 80.21%
- Lok Sabha constituency: Jajpur
- Vidhan Sabha constituency: Jajpur

Panasa is a village in Jajpur Town of Jajpur district in the Indian state of Odisha. Panasa's nearby villages are Ankula, Balighai, Balipokhari, Beherapatana, Bindhan, Korkora, Kusi, Patapur, Kunjabiharipur and Raghunathpur.

== Geography ==
The Panasa Village is located in Jajpur district of Odisha and it is 2 km from Jajpur City, Odisha. Village Panasa has an average altitude of 26 m (85 ft) above sea level. Panasa is bounded by Baitarani River from northern and eastern sides. Panasa also boasts a pond named Bhagban Nanda Pokhari.

== Culture ==
Panasa is a cultural village of which 52% of the population are men and 48% are women. There are many ancient temples in Panasa. The list of temples in Panasa includes Maa Panasai, Gopinath Temple, Maa Mangala Temple, Hanuman Temple, Bindhaneshwari Temple, Kamalai Temple, Swapneswar Mahadev Temple, Maa Bali Temple and Jagannath Temple. The Gopinath Temple in Panasa has a unique ancient idol of Lord Krishna which was dug out of the land from an unknown date. There is a Masjid as well in Panasa.

== Economy ==
Most of the people depend on agriculture, government/private services and many small businesses.

== Education ==
Schools and colleges located in Panasa and nearby are affiliated to Odisha Board of Secondary Education.

=== Schools in Odisha ===
- Bhagaban Nanda High School
- Panasa Upper Primary School
- Panasa Lower Primary School

== Transportation ==
Nearest airport to Panasa is Biju Patnaik International Airport in the State Capital, Bhubaneswar and nearest railway station is Jajpur Keonjhar Road (JJKR). Panasa is well connected with National Highways and Odisha State Highways via buses by Odisha State Road Transport Corporation.
