= Sangli turmeric =

Type of Turmeric variety cultivated in Maharashtra, India

Sangli turmeric (सांगलीची हळद)
- Geographical indication
- Description: Sangli turmeric is a turmeric variety cultivated in Maharashtra
- Type: Turmeric
- Area: Sangli district
- Country: India
- Registered: 7 November 2018
- Official website: ipindia.gov.in

Sangli turmeric is a variety of turmeric mainly grown in the Indian state of Maharashtra. It is a common and widely cultivated crop in Sangli district. Turmeric cultivation is prominent in the southern region of Sangli, specifically in the areas of Miraj, Tasgaon, Palus, Kadegaon, Walwa, Vita, Khanapur, and Chinchali. Sangli accounts for nearly 70 per cent of the state’s total production and stands as the premier trading hub for turmeric in Asia, and possibly globally. The district has garnered the nickname "Saffron City" due to its strong association with turmeric.

Under its Geographical Indication tag, it is referred to as "Sangli Turmeric".

== Name ==
Sangli turmeric is a prized crop in Sangli district and so named after it, with Sangli earning the reputation as the "Turmeric City" due to its extensive production of turmeric.

=== Local name ===
It is known locally as Sanglichi Halad (सांगलीची हळद). "Halad" means turmeric in the local state language of Marathi.

== Description ==
Sangli Turmeric is highly prized for its rich saffron color, making it a sought-after ingredient among spice manufacturers. This variety boasts a unique flavor profile, characterized by earthy, slightly bitter, and hot peppery notes, accompanied by a mustardy aroma. The appearance of Sangli Turmeric is marked by thick, fleshy rhizomes with less wrinkles and thin skin. Its saffron color and thick size make it an ideal addition to various culinary preparations, imparting a deep color and a distinctive flavor. Sangli Turmeric has worldwide acceptance. Sangli turmeric is renowned for its saffron color and distinctive flavor as unlike other varieties, the color of Sangli turmeric rhizomes remains consistent inside and out due to the local soil.

Sangli district features a traditional, airtight underground storage system for turmeric, locally referred to as "Peve". The unique color and aroma of Sangli turmeric are attributed to "Peve" and the physical properties of the local soil. These storage pits are found in the open fields of Haripur and Sangliwadi villages.

"Rajapuri" is a renowned turmeric variety originating from Sangli district. Sangli turmeric gained fame as "Rajapuri turmeric" due to its export to several countries through the Rajapur harbor port. In 2009, Sangli APMC celebrated 100 years of turmeric trading. The historic "Turmeric Wayade Bazar" auction system began in Sangli in 1910.

Turmeric is a significant export item from Sangli district, used as a spice, dye, and in medicinal and cosmetic applications. It is traded to various Indian states, including Mumbai, Gujarat, Uttar Pradesh, Madhya Pradesh, Bihar, and Delhi, as well as exported to countries like the Middle East, Iran, Iraq, Saudi Arabia, Great Britain, America, and European nations.

Sangli turmeric is a major foreign exchange earner for India. The Sangli APMC has a large-scale auction market system, influencing price fluctuations at the national level. The market review of turmeric transactions at Sangli is published in leading newspapers like the Times of India. On average, the turmeric trade at Sangli amounts to 1,39,965 quintals per year, contributing substantially to India's total turmeric trade.

Sangli turmeric is used as a condiment, natural dye, and in traditional medicine and cosmetics, as well as in religious ceremonies.

== Geographical indication ==
It was awarded the Geographical Indication (GI) status tag from the Geographical Indications Registry under the Union Government of India on 7 November 2018 (valid until 25 April 2024).

Sangli Turmeric Cluster Pvt Ltd, from Sangli, proposed the GI registration of Sangli turmeric. After filing the application in August 2014, the turmeric was granted the GI tag in 2018 by the Geographical Indication Registry in Chennai, making the name "Sangli turmeric" exclusive to the Turmeric grown in the region. It thus became the second turmeric variety from Maharashtra after Waigaon Turmeric and the 32nd type of goods from Maharashtra to earn the GI tag.

== See also ==
- Sangli raisins
- Kolhapur jaggery
- Erode Turmeric
- Vasmat Haldi
- Waigaon turmeric
- Lakadong turmeric
