= Trinity Saioo =

Indian agriculturalist and teacher

Padma Shri Trinity Saioo
- Born: 1 December 1972 (age 53); Mulieh village, West Jaintia Hills district, Meghalaya, India
- Occupation: Teacher
- Known for: Contributions to Lakadong Turmeric Farming

Trinity Saioo is an Indian teacher known for her contributions to promoting Indigenous farming practices especially cultivating the Lakadong turmeric in Meghalaya, India. She was awarded the Padma Shri in 2020 for her contributions in agriculture.

== Early life ==
Saioo was born and raised in Mulieh village in the West Jaintia Hills district of Meghalaya, India. Her husband is a farmer. They have six children.

== Awards ==
Saioo received the Padma Shri award on the 71st Republic Day in 2020 for her outstanding contributions to turmeric farming and the upliftment of women in agriculture.
