= Vasmat turmeric =

Type of Turmeric variety cultivated in Maharashtra, India

Vasmat Haldi (वसमत हळद)
- Geographical indication
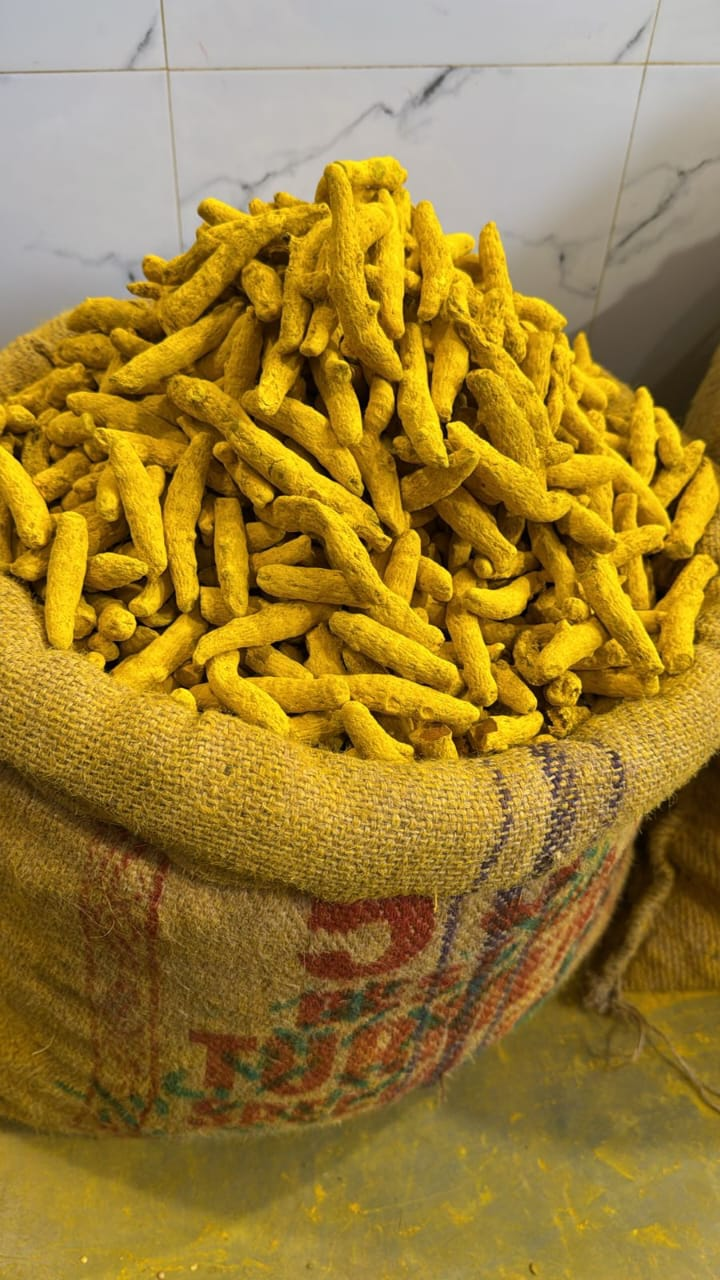
- Vasmat Haldi (Turmeric) fingers
- Description: Vasmat Haldi is a turmeric variety cultivated in Maharashtra
- Type: Turmeric
- Area: Basmath taluka, Hingoli district
- Country: India
- Registered: 30 March 2024
- Official website: ipindia.gov.in

Vasmat Haldi is a variety of turmeric mainly grown in the Indian state of Maharashtra. It is a common and widely cultivated crop in Hingoli district of the Marathwada region of Maharashtra. Turmeric cultivation is prominent in the districts of Hingoli, Parbhani, Nanded, Washim and Akola. Hingoli district has the largest area under turmeric cultivation in this region.

Under its Geographical Indication tag, it is referred to as "Vasmat Haldi (Turmeric)".

== Name ==
Vasmat Haldi वसमत हळद is a prized crop in Basmath taluka of Hingoli district, due to its extensive production of turmeric and so named after it. ("Halad" or "Haldi" means turmeric in the local state language of Marathi). Vasmath or Basmath or Vasmat are variations of the same name.

== Description ==
Vasmat Haldi, also known as turmeric, has a unique property of imparting flavor and color due to the presence of curcumin. Its quality, taste, texture, aroma, and color, along with its durability, make it distinct. The climatic conditions, soil characteristics, water quality, and special care contribute to the nutritional, medicinal, and chemical properties of Vasmat Haldi. Vasmat Haldi is cultivated in tropical climates for its rootstocks and has a short stem with large oblong leaves and bears ovate, pyriform, or oblong rhizomes. The rootstocks can be ground into a paste or dried and ground into a powder. The producers of Vasmat Haldi follow traditional and organic cultivation processes, a practice that has been in place since ancient times. The area is a notable exporter of the mother rhizome of 'Selam', a well-known turmeric variety.

It is used not only for domestic purposes but also in various religious festivals and spiritual ceremonies. Vasmat Haldi is a medicinal plant extensively used in Ayurveda, Unani, and Siddha medicine. It is used as a home remedy for various diseases. Vasmat Haldi is used in various forms as a condiment, flavoring agent, coloring agent, and principal ingredient in cooking. It also has applications in the drug and cosmetic industries due to its anti-cancer and anti-viral properties.

== Photo Gallery ==
Photos provided by a Vasmat Haldi farmer from Ridhura village.

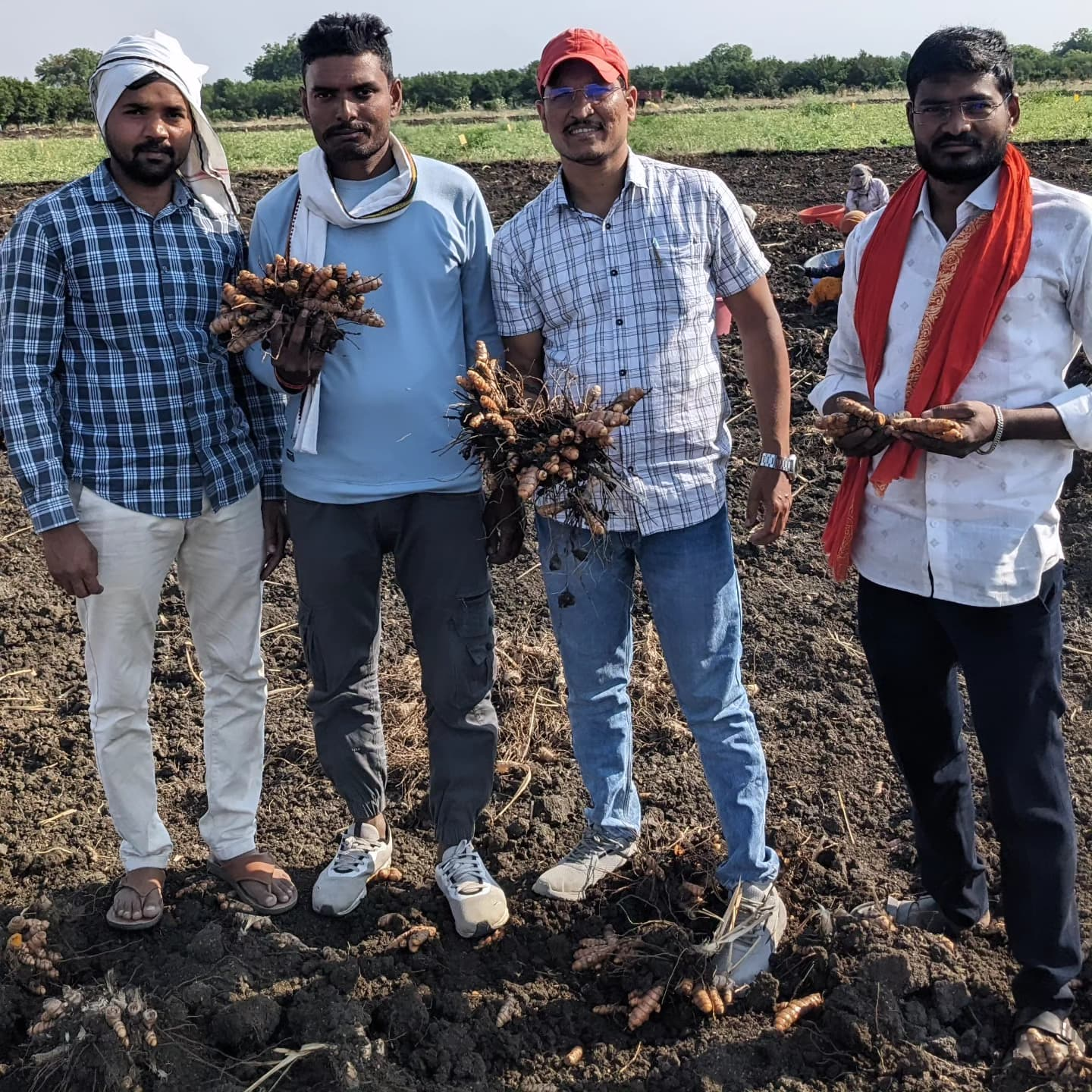
Farmers with freshly harvested turmeric fingers in a Ridhura village field

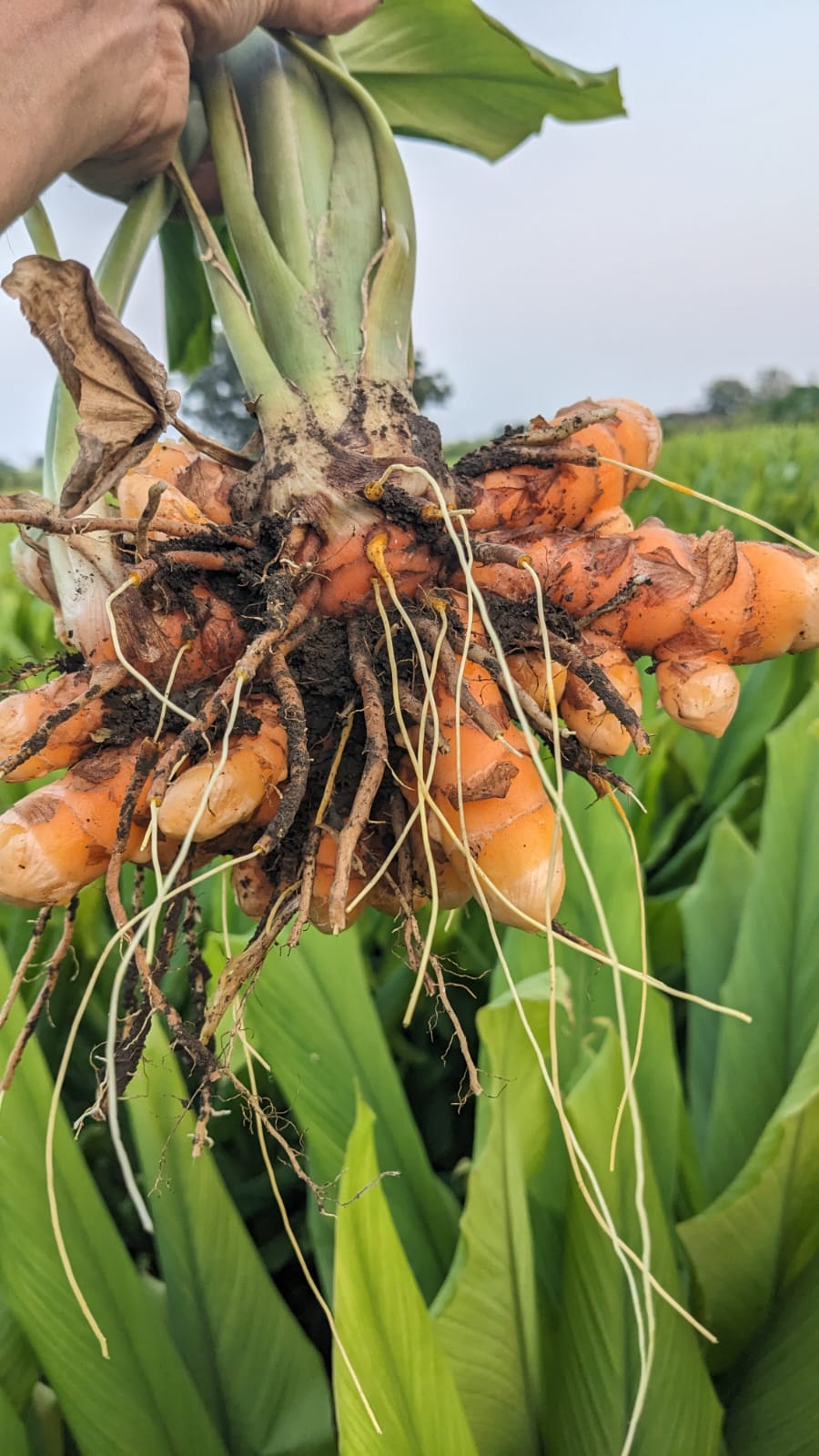
Close-up of freshly harvested Vasmat turmeric fingers

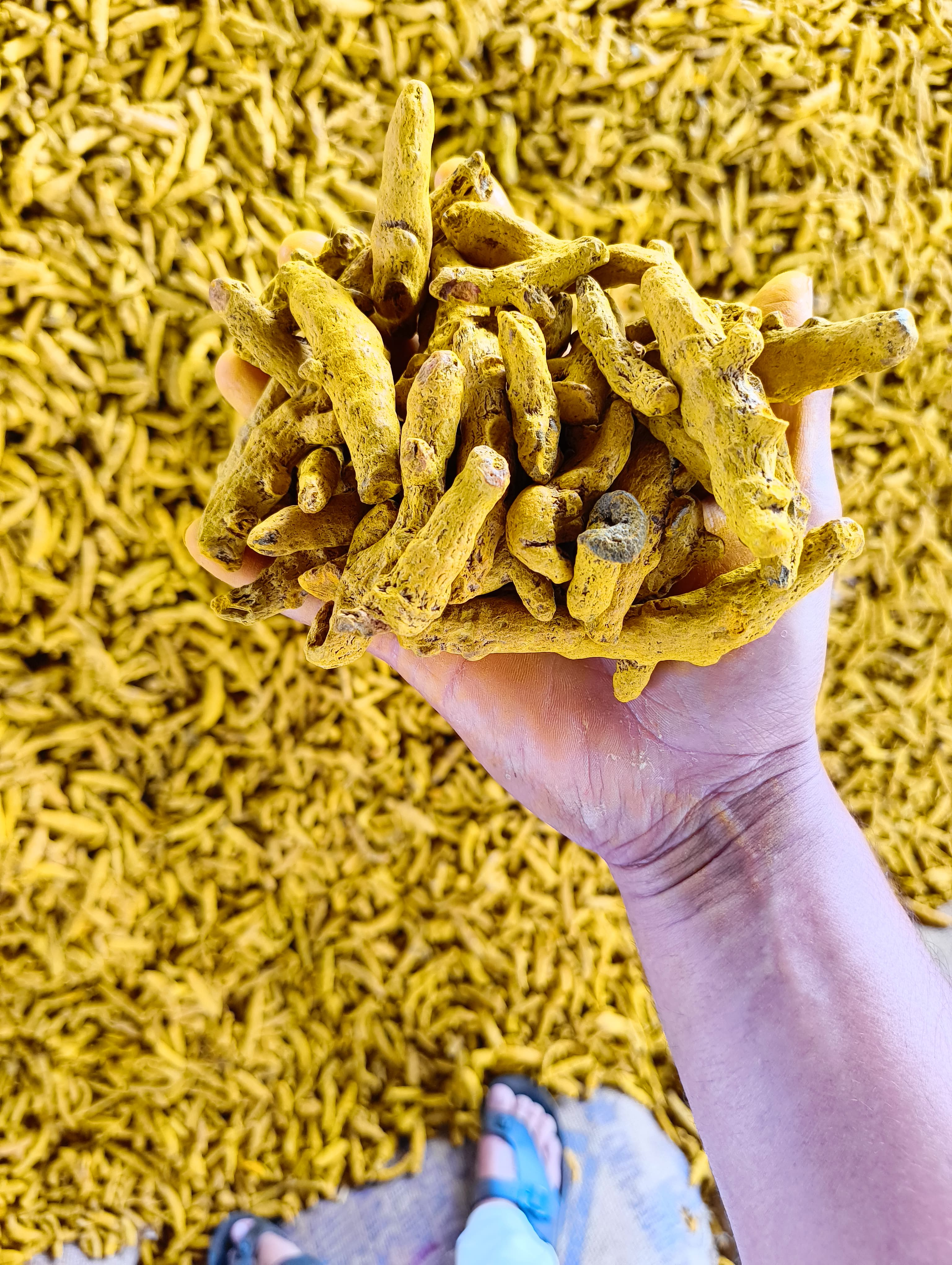
Dried Vasmat Turmeric fingers held in hand

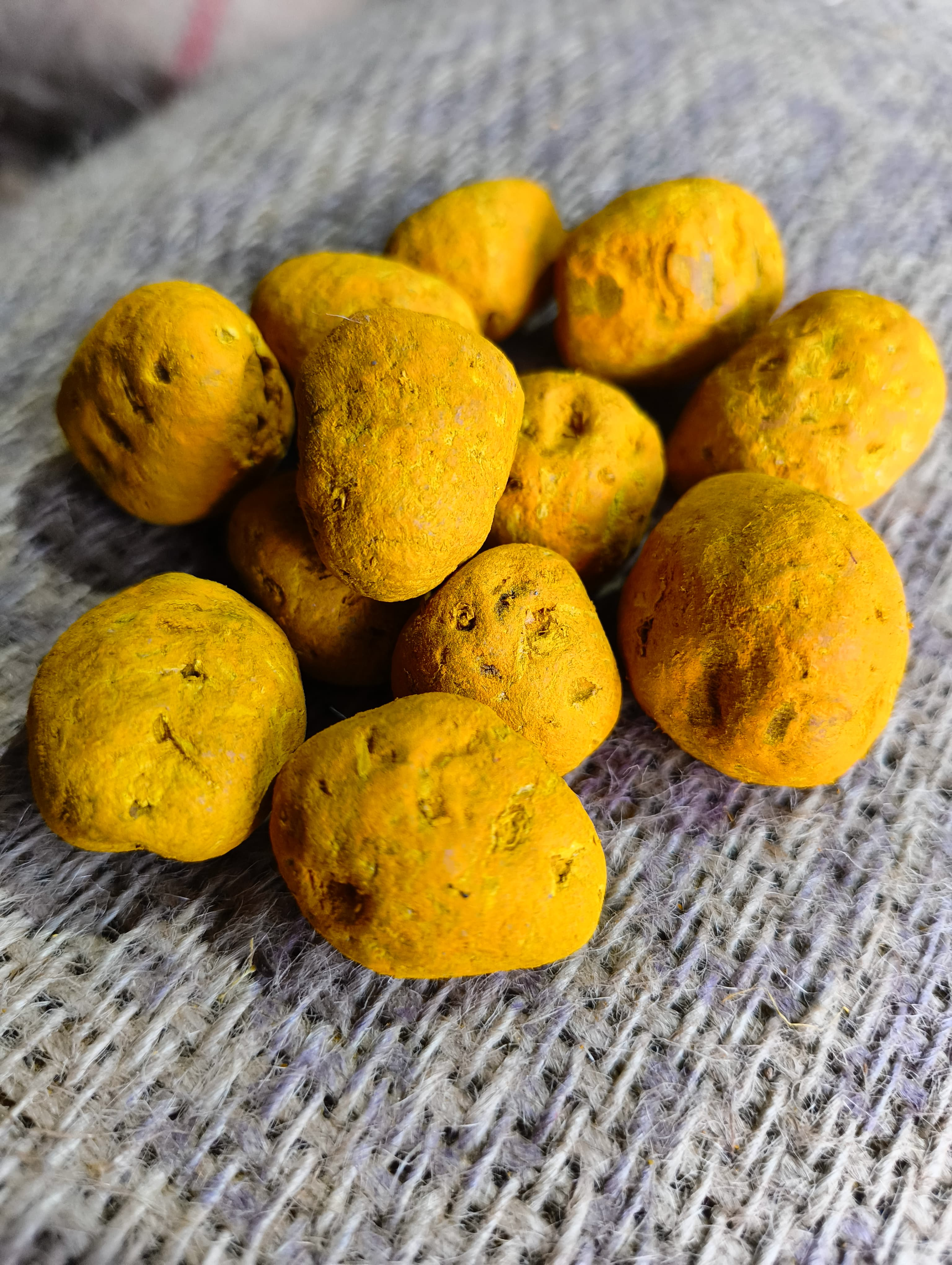
Vasmat Turmeric in bulb form

== Geographical indication ==
It was awarded the Geographical Indication (GI) status tag from the Geographical Indications Registry under the Union Government of India on 30 March 2024 (valid until 19 October 2031).

Honourable Balasaheb Thackeray Haridra Research and Training Center from Vasmat, proposed the GI registration of Vasmat Haldi. After filing the application in October 2021, the turmeric was granted the GI tag in 2024 by the Geographical Indication Registry in Chennai, making the name "Vasmat Haldi" exclusive to the turmeric grown in the region. It thus became the third turmeric variety from Maharashtra after Sangli turmeric and the 37th type of goods from Maharashtra to earn the GI tag.

== See also ==
- Sangli turmeric
- Erode Turmeric
- Waigaon turmeric
- Lakadong turmeric
