= State Highway 4 (Odisha) =

State highway in Odisha, India

Odisha State Highway 4 is a state highway of Odisha, India. It connects Gunupur to Koraput, and passes through Jaykaypur.
