= State Highway 5 (Odisha) =

State highway in Odisha, India

Odisha State Highway 5 is a state highway of Odisha. The 85-kilometre long highway connects Jaykaypur to Muniguda and ends at Tumudibandha. At Muniguda, the Odisha State Highway 6 leads off to the northwest to the city of Bhawanipatna.
