= Waigaon turmeric =

Type of Turmeric variety cultivated in Maharashtra, India

Waigaon Turmeric (वायगावची हळद)
- Geographical indication
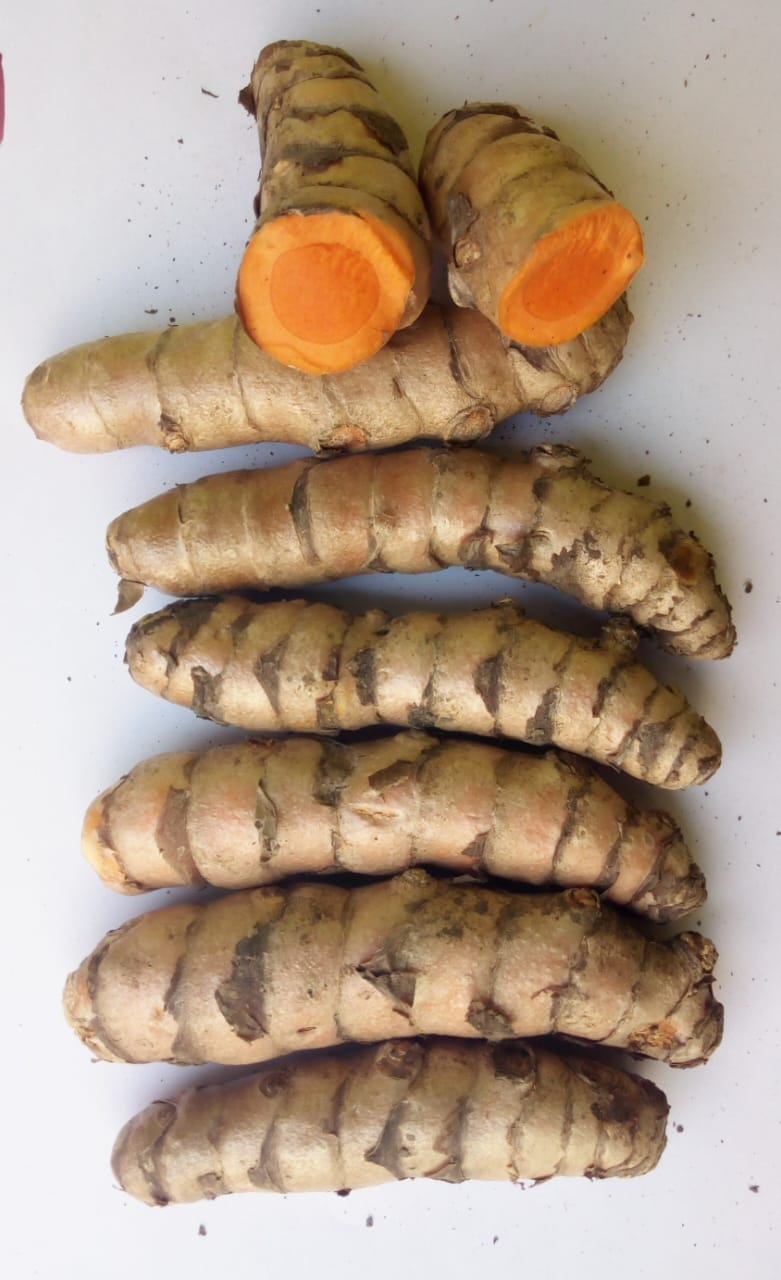
- Waigaon Turmeric fingers
- Description: Waigaon turmeric is a turmeric variety cultivated in Maharashtra
- Type: Turmeric
- Area: Waigaon village of Samudrapur taluka in Wardha along with Muradpur, Pawangaon, Mangrul, and Dongargaon villages
- Country: India
- Registered: 3 June 2016
- Official website: ipindia.gov.in

Waigaon Turmeric is a variety of Turmeric mainly grown in the Indian state of Maharashtra. It is a common and widely cultivated crop in the village of Waigaon located in Samudrapur taluka of Wardha district. It is also grown in other villages of Samudrapur taluka, including Muradpur, Pawangaon, Mangrul, and Dongargaon.

Under its Geographical Indication tag, it is referred to as "Waigaon Turmeric".

== Name ==
Waigaon Turmeric is a prized crop in Waigaon village with approximately 80% farmers cultivating this turmeric variety and so named after it.

=== Trivia ===
The village is named as "Haladya Waigaon" or "Waigaon Haldya" ("Halad" means turmeric in the local state language of Marathi), reflecting its reputation as a premier hub for cultivating unique and high-quality turmeric.

=== Local name ===
It is known locally as Waigaon Halad (वायगावची हळद).

== Description ==
Waigaon Turmeric is distinct in its characteristics, having a dark mustard yellow color that sets it apart from other turmeric varieties. The texture of its powder is notably soft. The aroma is very pungent, yet attractive. Additionally, the whole dry turmeric finger sets are remarkably thick and solid, with a fleshy appearance.

Among India's four GI-tagged turmeric varieties - Erode Manjal, Kandhamal haldi, Waigaon turmeric, and Sangli turmeric - Waigaon turmeric stands out as superior.

Waigaon Turmeric has a long history of cultivation dating back to the Mughal era in Waigaon village, Samudrapur tehsil, with historical records showing its cultivation was allotted to the Mali community in that era.

The black soil of Waigaon, with its depth of around 10 feet, is suitable for turmeric cultivation. It has excellent water retention, a pH level greater than 8, high organic carbon content, and good drainage, preventing waterlogging and root rot. This unique combination of soil characteristics contributes to the distinct dark yellow color of Waigaon Turmeric, which is renowned for its vibrant color and high curcumin content, shaping the quality and characteristics of Waigaon Turmeric.

Waigaon Turmeric is cultivated using organic farming methods, eliminating the use of chemical fertilizers or pesticides, and is grown under rain-fed conditions, relying solely on natural rainfall.

The entire turmeric crop is utilized in various ways, including in marriage and religious ceremonies, where turmeric powder, fingers, and tubers are used, such as in the 'Kankan bandhana' ceremony. In ancient Indian culture, turmeric is believed to possess spiritual significance, granting prosperity and cleansing the body's energy centers. Its paste is applied to the forehead during pujas and weddings. Additionally, turmeric powder is a staple spice in food preparation, enhancing flavor, color, and preservation, and is used in curries and other dishes to improve storage and palatability.

Waigaon Turmeric has various medicinal uses, including cancer treatment, HIV treatment, treatment of neurological diseases, curing arthritis, treating cough and cold, healing skin diseases, and healing wounds.

As of 2019, this turmeric variety is exported to countries like Oman.

== Photo Gallery ==
Actual photos provided by a farmer from Gaydhane Natural Farm of Khairagaon village located in Samudrapur taluka.

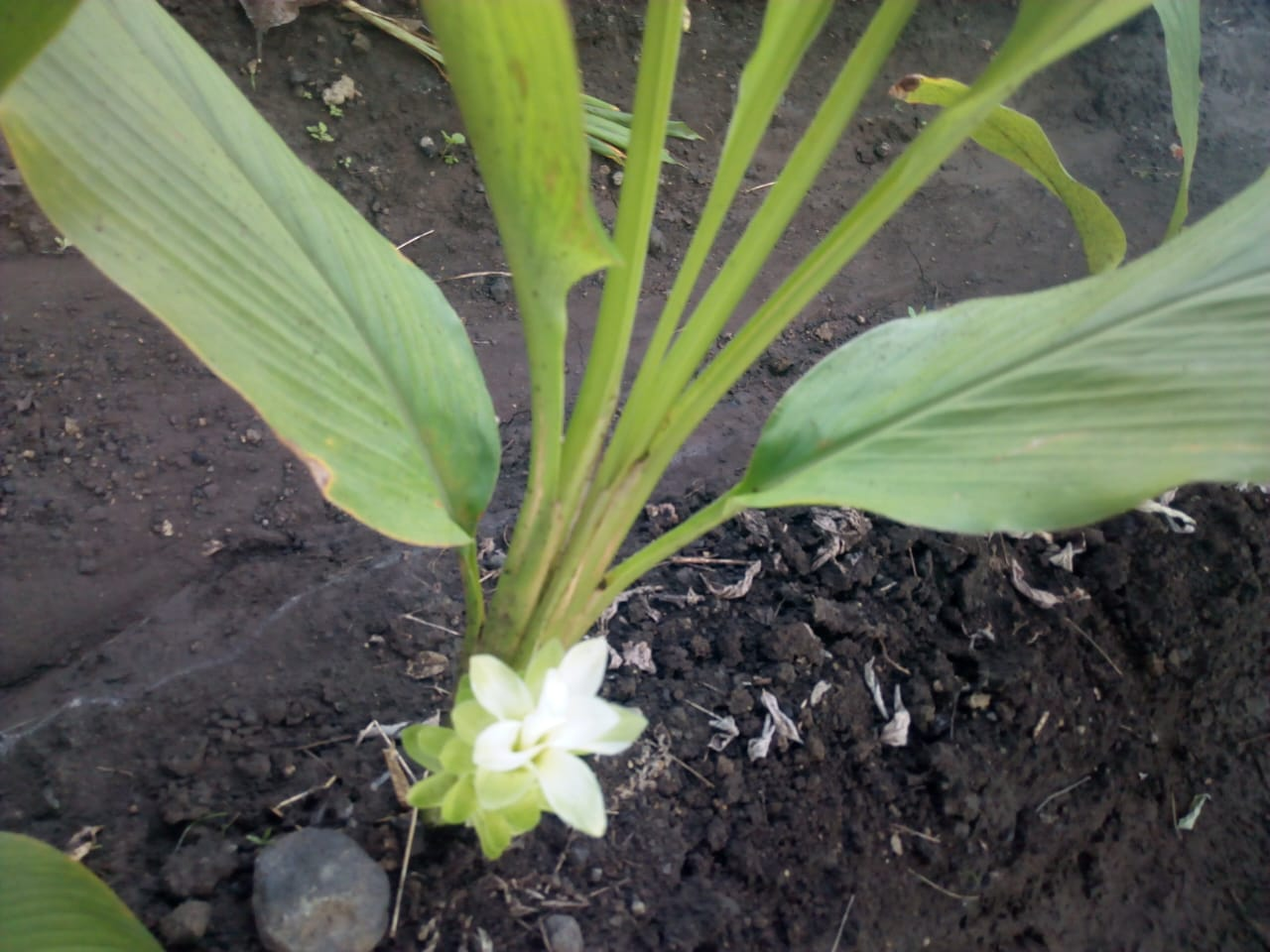
Close-up of Waigaon Turmeric plant

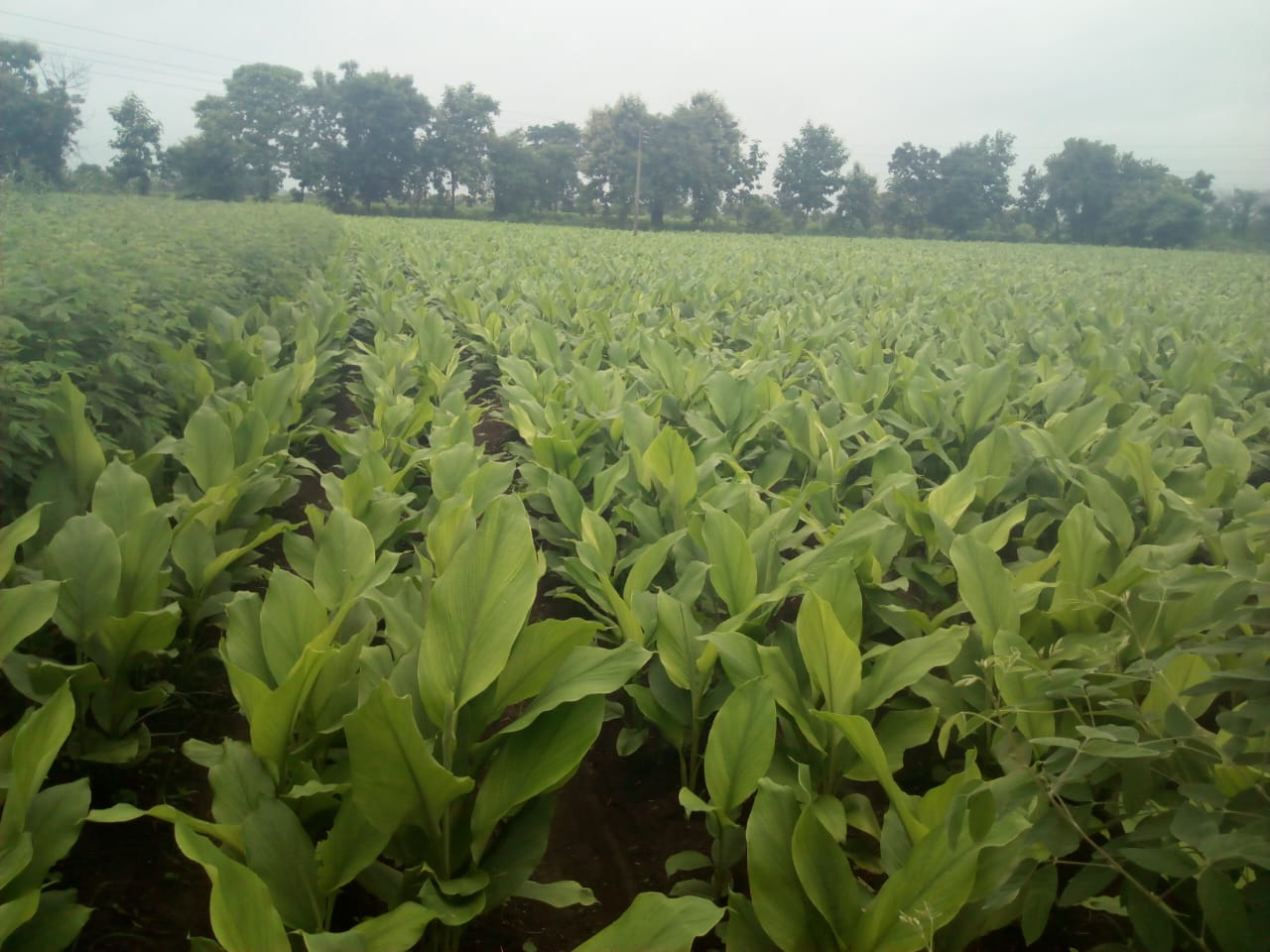
Longshot view of Close-up of Waigaon Turmeric field at Khairagaon

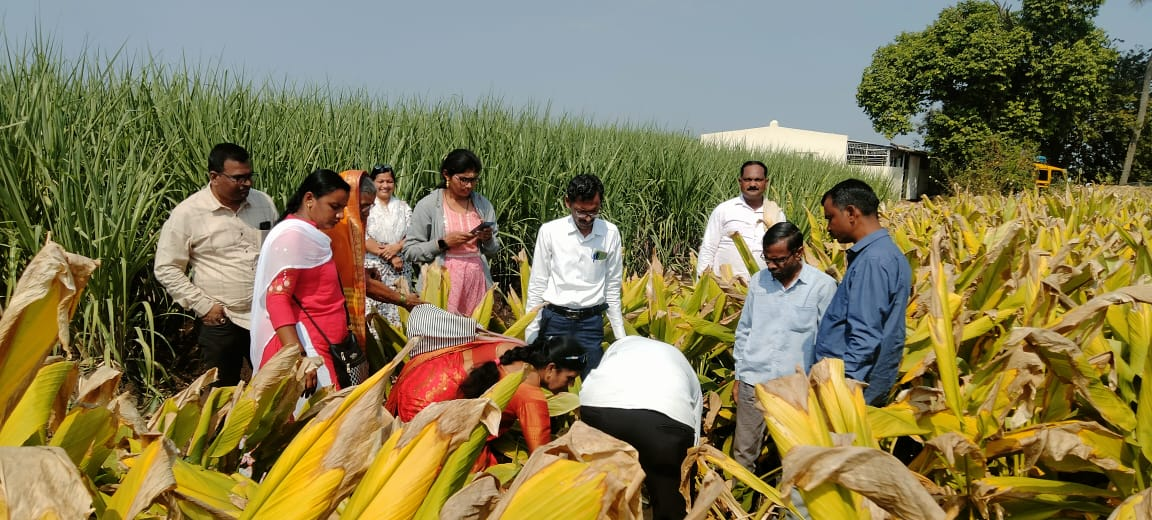
Another photo of Field visit at Turmeric field at Khairagaon village

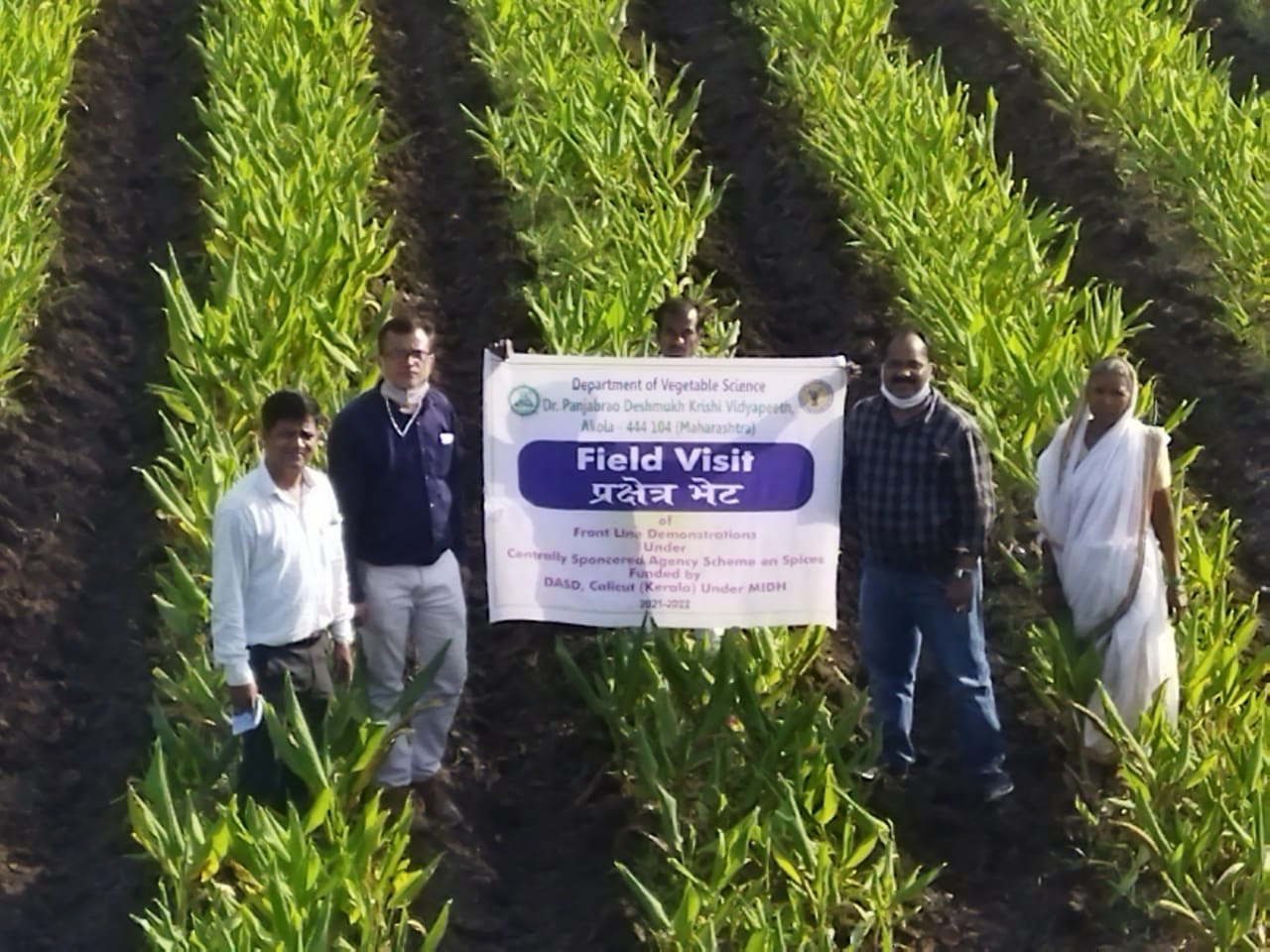
Field visit at Gaydhane Natural Farm located at Khairagaon village

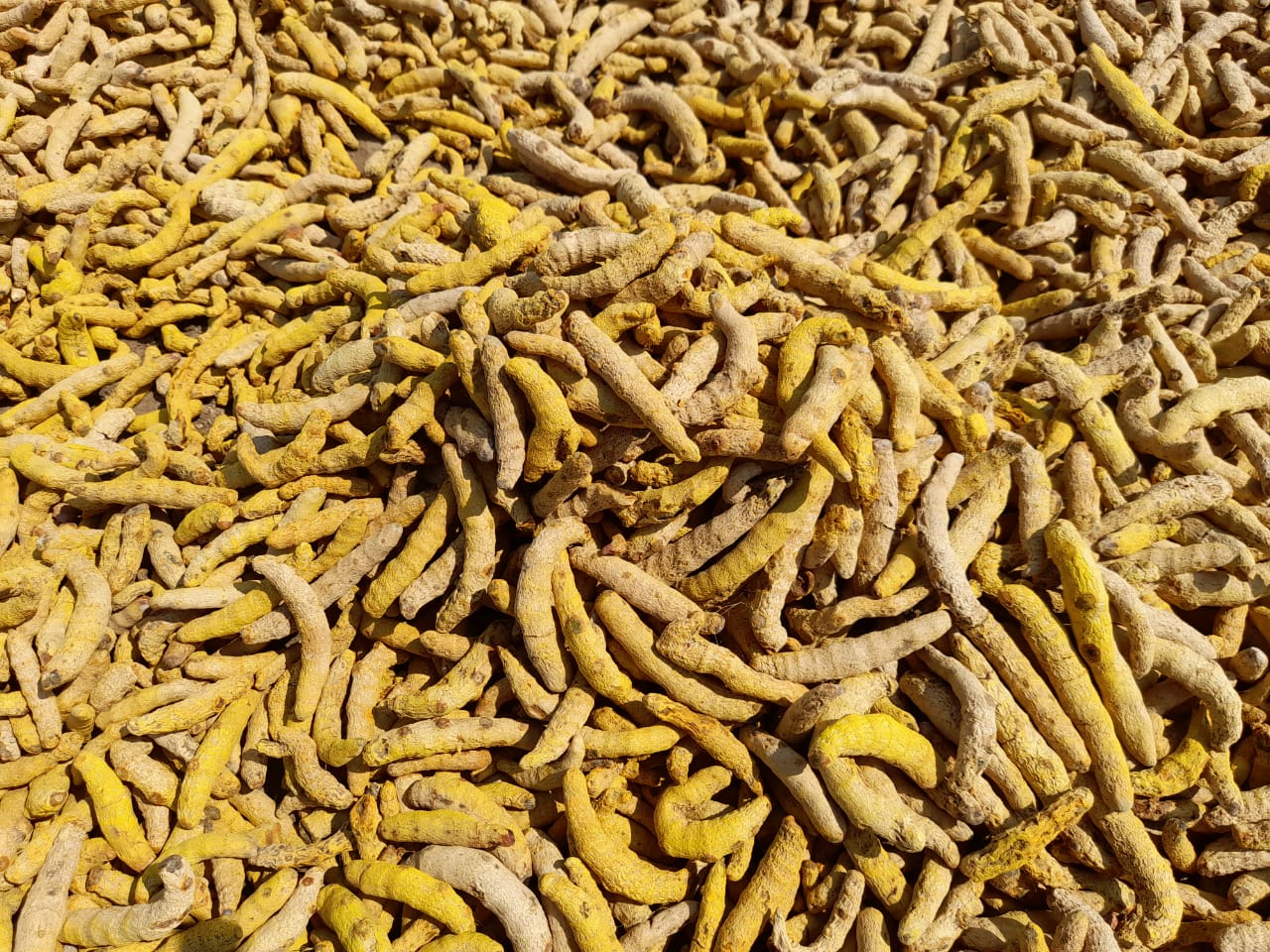
Waigaon Turmeric fingers in dried form

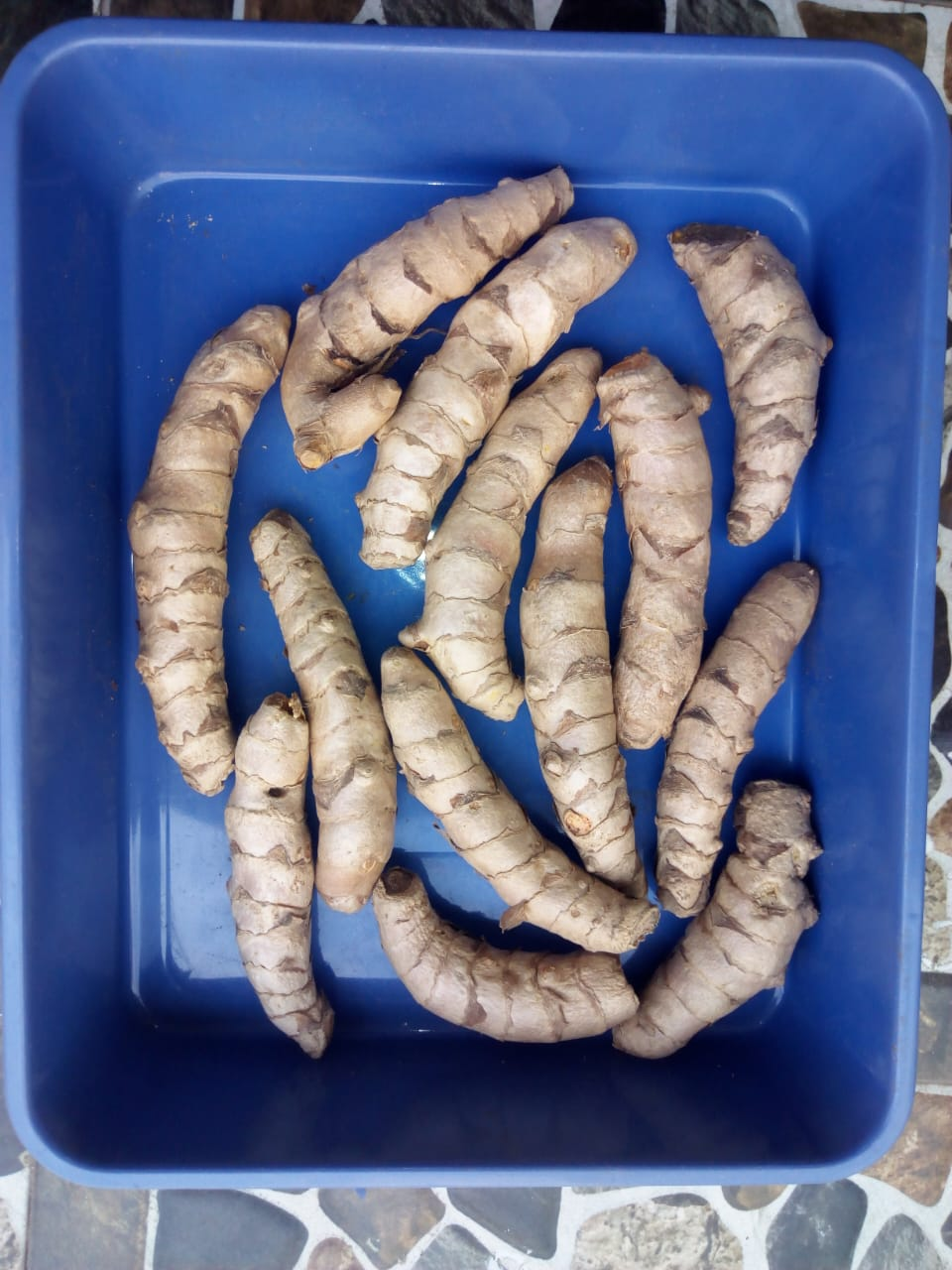
Freshly plucked Waigaon Turmeric fingers

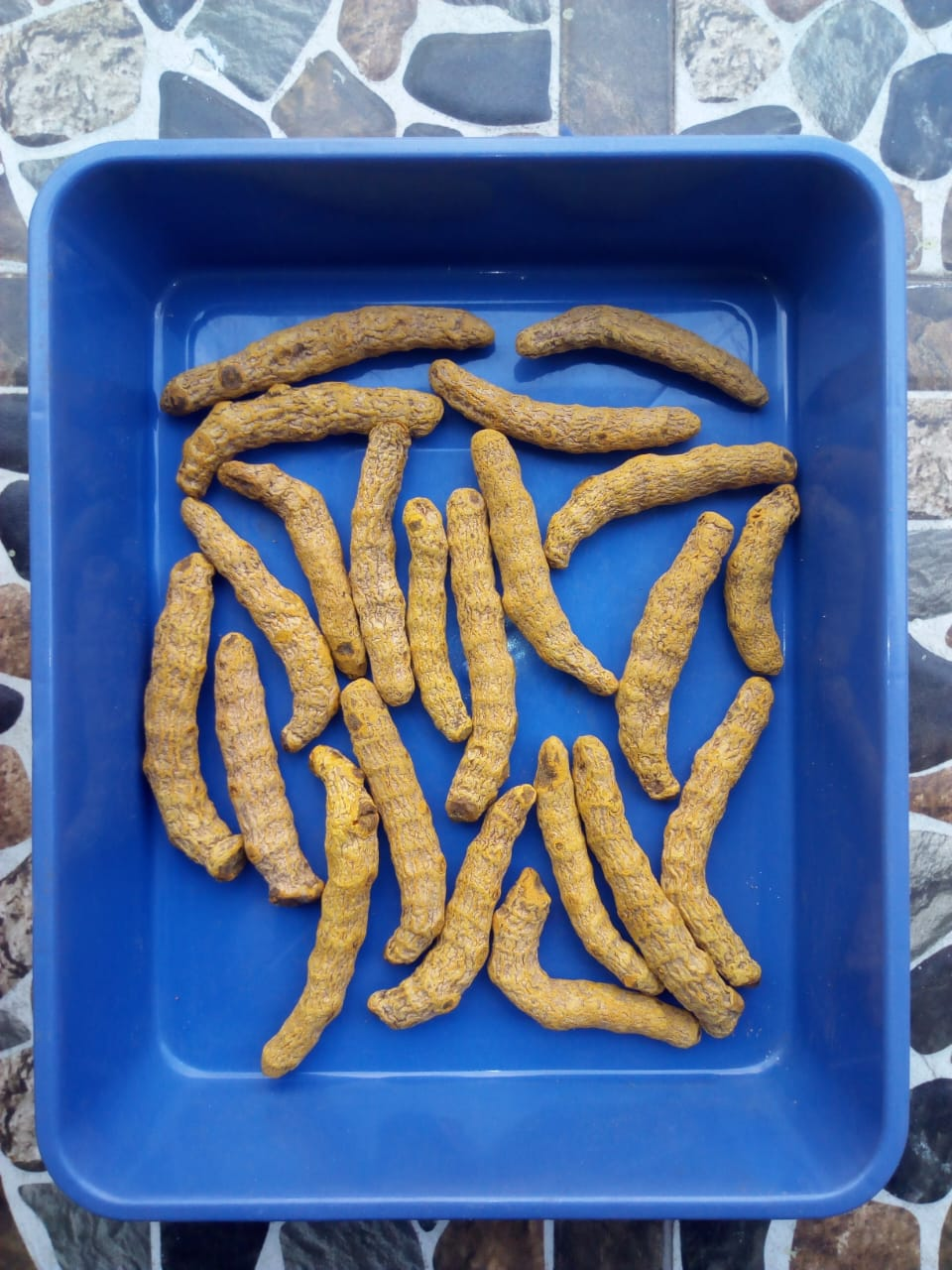
Dried Waigaon Turmeric fingers

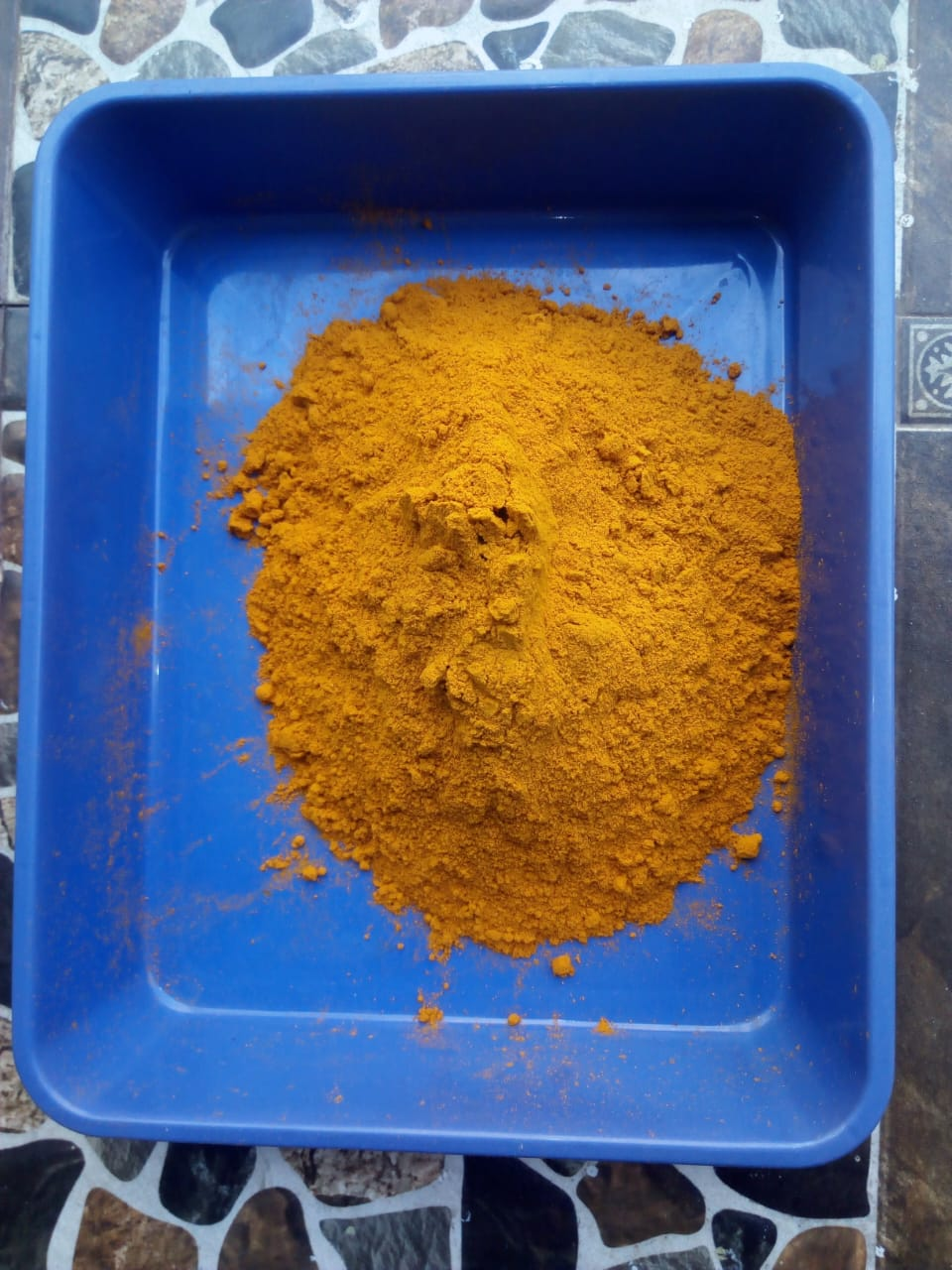
Waigaon Turmeric powder

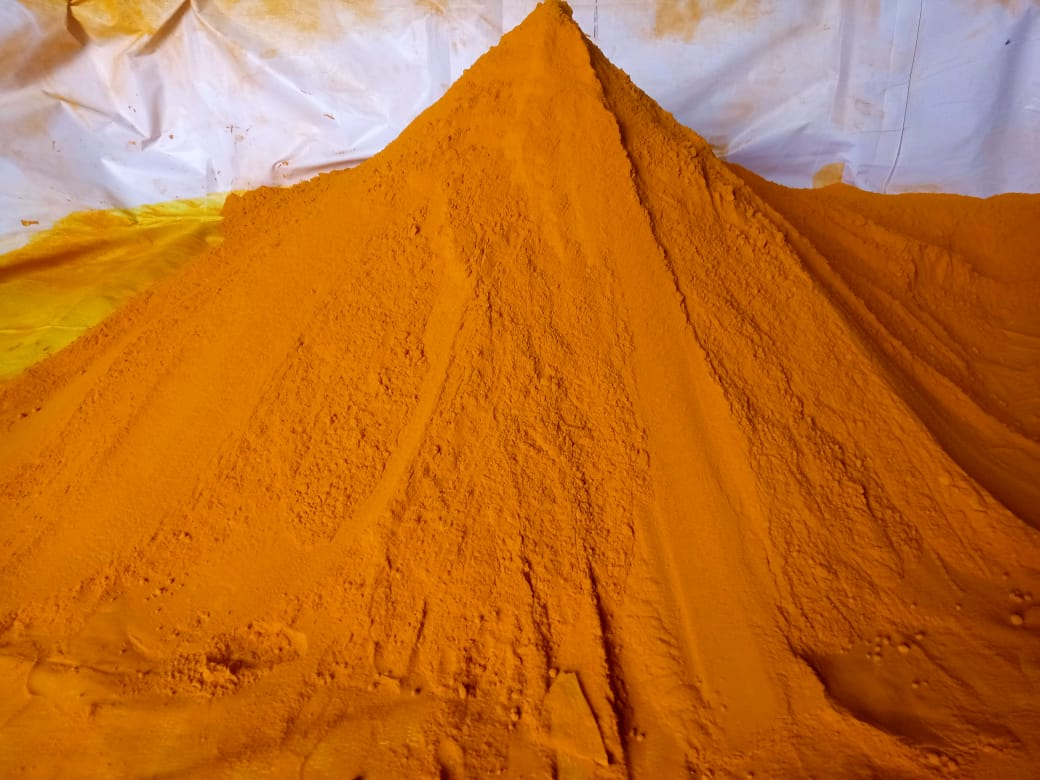
Waigaon Turmeric in powder form

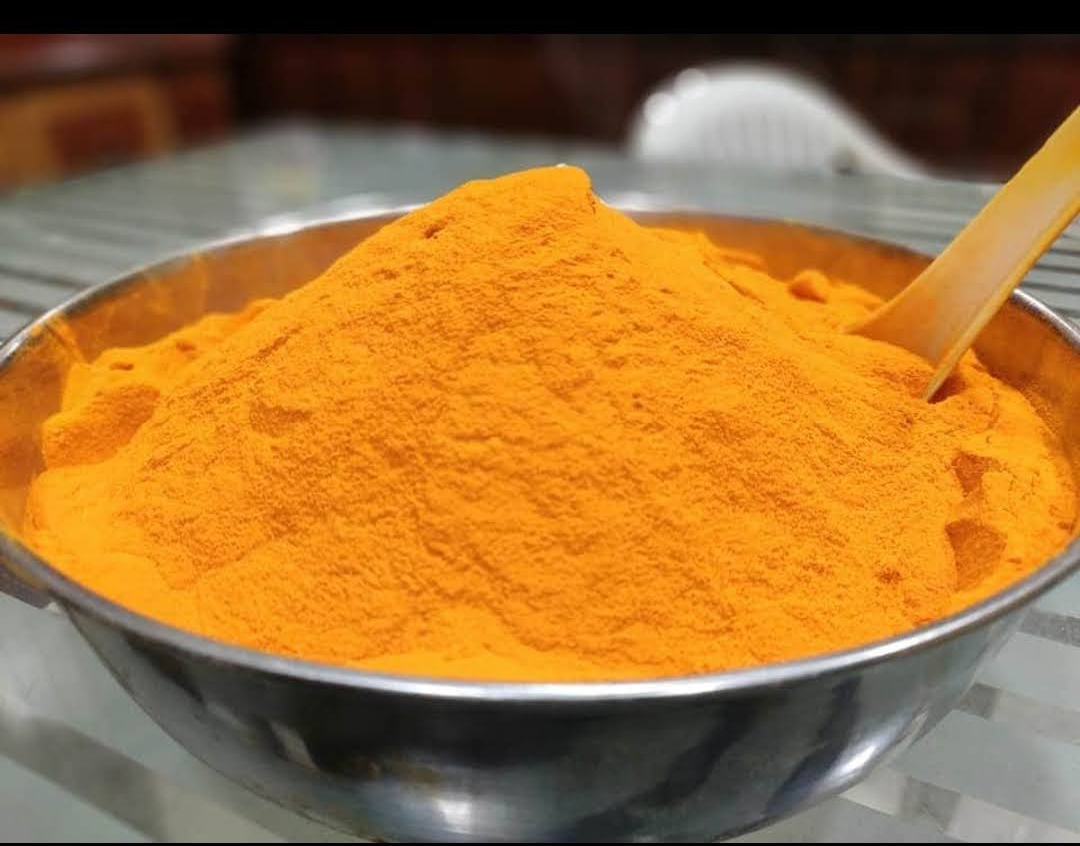
Another photo for Waigaon Turmeric in powder form

== Geographical indication ==
It was awarded the Geographical Indication (GI) status tag from the Geographical Indications Registry, under the Union Government of India, on 3 June 2016 (valid until 25 March 2034).

Waigaon Halad Utpadak Sangh from Samudrapur, proposed the GI registration of Waigaon Turmeric. After filing the application in March 2014, the turmeric was granted the GI tag in 2016 by the Geographical Indications Registry in Chennai, making the name "Waigaon Turmeric" exclusive to the turmeric grown in the region. It thus became the first turmeric variety from Maharashtra before Sangli Turmeric and the 21st type of goods from Maharashtra to earn the GI tag.

== See also ==
- Sangli turmeric
- Vasmat Haldi
- Erode Turmeric
- Lakadong turmeric
