= State Highway 6 (Odisha) =

State highway in Odisha, India

Odisha State Highway 6 is a state highway of Odisha, in India. It connects Muniguda and Odisha State Highway 5 to the city of Bhawanipatna in the northwest.
