= Chandili =

- Town
- Location in Odisha, India Chandili (India)
- Coordinates: 19.2707°N 83.4201°E
- Country: India
- State: Odisha
- District: Rayagada

Government
  - Type: NAC
  - Body: Chandili NAC

Population (2001)
  - Total: 18,688

Languages
  - Official: Odia
- Time zone: UTC+5:30 (IST)
- Vehicle registration: OD
- Website: odisha.gov.in

Chandili is a census town and a Notified Area Council in Rayagada district in the state of Odisha, India.

== Demographics ==
As of 2001 India census, Chandili had a population of 18,688. Males constitute 51% of the population and females 49%. Chandili has an average literacy rate of 66%, higher than the national average of 59.5%; with male literacy of 74% and female literacy of 56%. 12% of the population is under 6 years of age. Chandili is one of the three major urban centres in Rayagada district, alongside Rayagada municipality and Gunupur NAC. The town is located in the Eastern Ghats agro-climatic region. The district of Rayagada is rich in mineral resources including bauxite and silicon, and the local economy is primarily agrarian, with paddy, ragi, maize and groundnut among the main crops cultivated in the area. Chandili hosts its own police station under the Jaykaypur jurisdiction. M/s Fimachem India Ltd., a chemical manufacturing company, operates a facility in the Komtalpeta area of Chandili.
