= Tikiri =

- Village
- Location within Odisha
- Coordinates: 19.1785°N 83.0912°E
- Country: India
- State: Odisha
- District: Rayagada
- Subdistrict: Kasipur

Population (2001)
  - Total: 1,984
- Time zone: UTC+05:30 (IST)
- Pincode: 765015

Tikiri is a village in Rayagada district of Orissa state in India. Tikiri is a small Industrial town located in Rayagada District in the State of Odisha. It is 50 kilometers away from Rayagada District Headquarter and 80 kilometers away from Koraput District Head quarter. It is 20 kilometers away from Rupkona Junction. It is approachable by NH 326A (Rayagada –Koraput) till Rupkona and subsequently diverting another 20 kilometers in Rupkona –Kashipur State Highway. Being situated at high sea-level, it almost brings pleasant climate throughout the year and the summer days are not that much hot like other parts of Odisha. Utkal Alumina International Limited – a flagship of Hindalco group (Aditya Birla Conglomerate) is situated at Tikiri. Utkal Alumina is an Alumina Refinery of capacity 2 MTPA with its bauxite mine at Rayagada/Kalahandi District. Tikiri is basically a Panchyat, having its Panhayat Samiti at Kashipur (20 kilometers away from Tikiri towards Kalahandi District. It has population of five thousands including local and employees working in Refinery plant.

== Economy ==
Tikiri which was not traceable for a good period, has suddenly raise its importance after the commissioning of the Alumina Refinery of Hindalco Group. Almost this plant brought fortune, jobs, livelihood and growth to the place.

Tikiri itself is having a Railway station, which was initially there but precisely developed by UAIL in present days in to a big one and the trains who are having stoppage at this station are 1.Jagdalpur- Bhubaneswar Hirakhand Express, 2.Jagdalpur-Rourkela Express 3. Koraput – Vizag DMU and 4. Koraput- Sambalpur Passenger. Tikiri is 400 kilometers away from the state capital Bhubaneswar and one can reach Tikiri from Bhubaneswar taking the Hirakhand express or private luxury buses from Barmunda Bus stand. While coming Tikiri from Bhubaneswar one shall pass through Berhampur, Palasa, Paralekhimundi, Gunpur, Therubali, and Rayagada while coming by NH. Similarly one can come via Berhampur, Digapahandi, Gumuda, Padmapur, Ramanaguda, Therubali and Rayagada while coming by NH-SH.

Presently, the MLA of Rayagada constituency Mr.Makaranda Moduli hails from Tikiri and is an independent MLA. The main cultivation of this place is paddy, popcorn, Groundnut, Potato, Onion, Mandia /ragi / finger millet and other seasonal vegetables. The place is having one Hanuman Temple, One Shiva Temple and a Jagannath Temple to worship.

A good number of small and medium sized springs are flowing around this area and water is not a big concern in this area. However- Tikiri has a bit costly in terms of living because of the presence of the Alumina Industry.

== Education ==
The village and surrounding areas are served by several schools, including government and private institutions, which cater to the educational needs of both tribal and non-tribal populations.Utkal Alumina has also contributed to educational initiatives as part of its corporate social responsibility efforts. Aditya Birla public school, Saraswati Sishu Mandir are the two important educational institutes in that place. But for intermediate and other higher education one has to go to Laxmipur (20 km away) in east direction, Kashipur (20 kilometers away in west direction) or Jaswantpur (20 kilometers away in south direction).
