= National Highway 59 (India) =

National highway in India

National Highway 59
- Map of National Highway 59 in red
- Schematic map of National Highways in India

Route information
- Length: 352 km (219 mi)

Major junctions
- West end: NH 353 / SH 16 in Khariar
- NH 26 in Belgaon NH 326 in Dhaugaon NH 157 in Asika
- East end: NH 16 in Brahmapur

Location
- Country: India
- States: Odisha

Highway system
- Roads in India; Expressways; National; State; Asian
← NH 58	→ NH 60

National Highway 59 (NH 59) is a National Highway in India connecting Khariar and Brahmapur in the state of Odisha. Before renumbering of national highways, route of NH-59 was part of old national highway 217. The Highway is connected with SH 42 of Odisha State near Bangomunda.

== Route ==
NH59 links Khariar, Titlagarh, Lankagarh, Baligurha, Sorada, Asika, Hinjilikatu and Brahmapur in the state of Odisha.

== See also ==
- List of national highways in India
- List of national highways in India by state
