= Laxmipur, Narayanpet district =

Laxmipur
- Gram panchayat
- Country: India
- State: Telangana
- District: Narayanpet

Languages
  - Official: Telugu
- Time zone: UTC+5:30 (IST)
- Telephone code: 91-08506
- Vehicle registration: TS 38

Laxmipur is a village and Gram panchayat in Narayanpet mandal of Narayanpet district, Telangana, India.
