= Tumudibandha =

- Town
- Location in Odisha, India Tumudibandha (India)
- Coordinates: 19°57′25″N 83°42′0″E
- Country: India
- State: Odisha
- District: Kandhamal
- Time zone: UTC+5:30 (IST)
- PIN: 762107
- Vehicle registration: OD
- Website: odisha.gov.in

Tumudibandha is a small town in Kandhamal district, Odisha, India. State Highway 5 that connects Jaykaypur to Muniguda ends at Tumudibandha.
