= Lakshmipur, Orissa =

Laxmipur
- Village
- Location within Odisha
- Coordinates: 18.991616°N 83.116154°E
- Country: India
- State: Odisha
- District: Koraput district

Population (2011)
  - Total: 3,292

Languages
  - Official: Odia
- Time zone: UTC+5:30 (IST)

Laxmipur is a village in Koraput district in the Indian state of Odisha.

== Demographics ==
As of 2011 India census, Laxmipur had a population of 3,292 in 768 households. Males constitute 52.85% of the population and females 47.14%. Laxmipur has an average literacy rate of 62.75%, lower than the national average of 74%, male literacy is 62.3%, and female literacy is 37.6%. In Laxmipur, 11.75% of the population is under 6 years of age.
