= Lakshmipur, Dang =

Coordinates: 28°2′N 82°34′E

Laxmipur लक्ष्मीपूर
- Village Development Committee
- Interactive map of Laxmipur
- Country: Nepal
- Province: Lumbini Province
- District: Dang Deukhuri District

Population (1991)
  - Total: 9,075
- Time zone: UTC+5:45 (Nepal Time)

Laxmipur is a ward in the Ghorahi Sub Metropolitan which is located in Dang District in Lumbini Province of south-western Nepal. At the time of the 1991 Nepal census it had a population of 9,075 persons residing in 1493 individual households.
