= Raikia =

- Town
- Location in Odisha, India Raikia (India)
- Coordinates: 20.47°N 84.23°E
- Country: India
- State: Odisha
- District: Kandhamal
- Elevation: 485 m (1,591 ft)

Languages
  - Official: Odia
- Time zone: UTC+5:30 (IST)
- Vehicle registration: OD-12
- Website: odisha.gov.in

Raikia is a town in Kandhamal district in the Indian state of Odisha.

== About ==
The population of Raikia mainly consists of Hindus, Christians (Catholic and Baptist), and a decent population of the tribe (Kandha). It is known as the business capital of Kandhamal district. The town has many educational institutions like Jivan Jyoti Mahavidyalaya (where BA, BSc are the courses you can opt for), St. Catherine's Girls High School (co-education till std 5 and unisex education after words), Bijay High School, Govt. Residential Girls High School (Kanyashram), Saraswati Sishu Bidya Mandir and many more. There are few very good hospitals like Govt. Hospital and Mission Hospital.

== Location ==
It is located 227 km from Bhubaneshwar, the state capital of Odisha and 147 km from Berhampur, the major city of South Odisha. The nearest railway station is Rairakhol around 160 km from it. The region around Phulbani has a variety of flora and fauna. It is a place surrounded by hills and has a lot of small and big waterfalls around it. The most spectacular of the lot is situated at a distance of about 10 km Mondasur kuti among the local people is situated at a distance of about 10 km from Raikia.
