= Baliguda =

- Town
- Location within Odisha Location within India
- Coordinates: 20°12′N 83°55′E
- Country: India
- State: Odisha
- District: Kandhamal
- Pincode: 762103

Baliguda is a town in Kandhamal district of Odisha, India. It is sub-divisional headquarter of Baliguda sub-division. It is the largest subdivision of Odisha. The area's scenery attracts tourists. Maa Pattakhanda is the presiding goddess of the town. Nearby tourist destinations include Daringbadi, Belaghara, Chakapada, and Jalespatta.

== Demographics ==
As of 2011, Baliguda town has population of 16,611 of which 8,389 are males while 8,222 are females. Literacy rate of Baliguda is 84.05% higher than state average of 72.87%. In Baliguda, Male literacy is 91.90% while female literacy rate is 76.11%.
