= Jaykaypur =

Town in India

Coordinates: 19.247544°N 83.419404°E

Jaykaypur (also known as J.K Pur or Jaykaypur Township or JK Pur Township) is a small town on the bank of Nagavali River in the Rayagada district, Odisha, India. It came into existence due to the inception of JK Paper Mills in the early 1960s, which is now a publicly traded company. As a result, the name "Jaykaypur" is influenced by the company name JK Paper Mills. The company is publicly listed on popular stock exchanges (Nifty 50 and Sensex) in India. The companies' Q2 net profit for FY 23 more than doubled. For many decades, the main developing factor for Jaykaypur was JK Paper Mills. However, today a few other private limited companies and small-scale businesses around the town are also contributing towards the development of areas beyond Jaykaypur. Even though Jaykaypur is a small industrial town, it is highly competitive and has educated people. Children who grew up here achieved tremendous success in their careers and have fanned out to all corners of the globe. Jaykaypur is not home to big educational institutes or universities, but two schools (Lakshmipat Singhania Public School and LPS High School) provide primary and secondary education for students to have a better foundation. For higher education, especially for engineering, students can go to GIET University, which is approximately 60 kilometers from Jaykaypur.
