= Erode turmeric =

Type of turmeric

Erode Turmeric
- Geographical indication
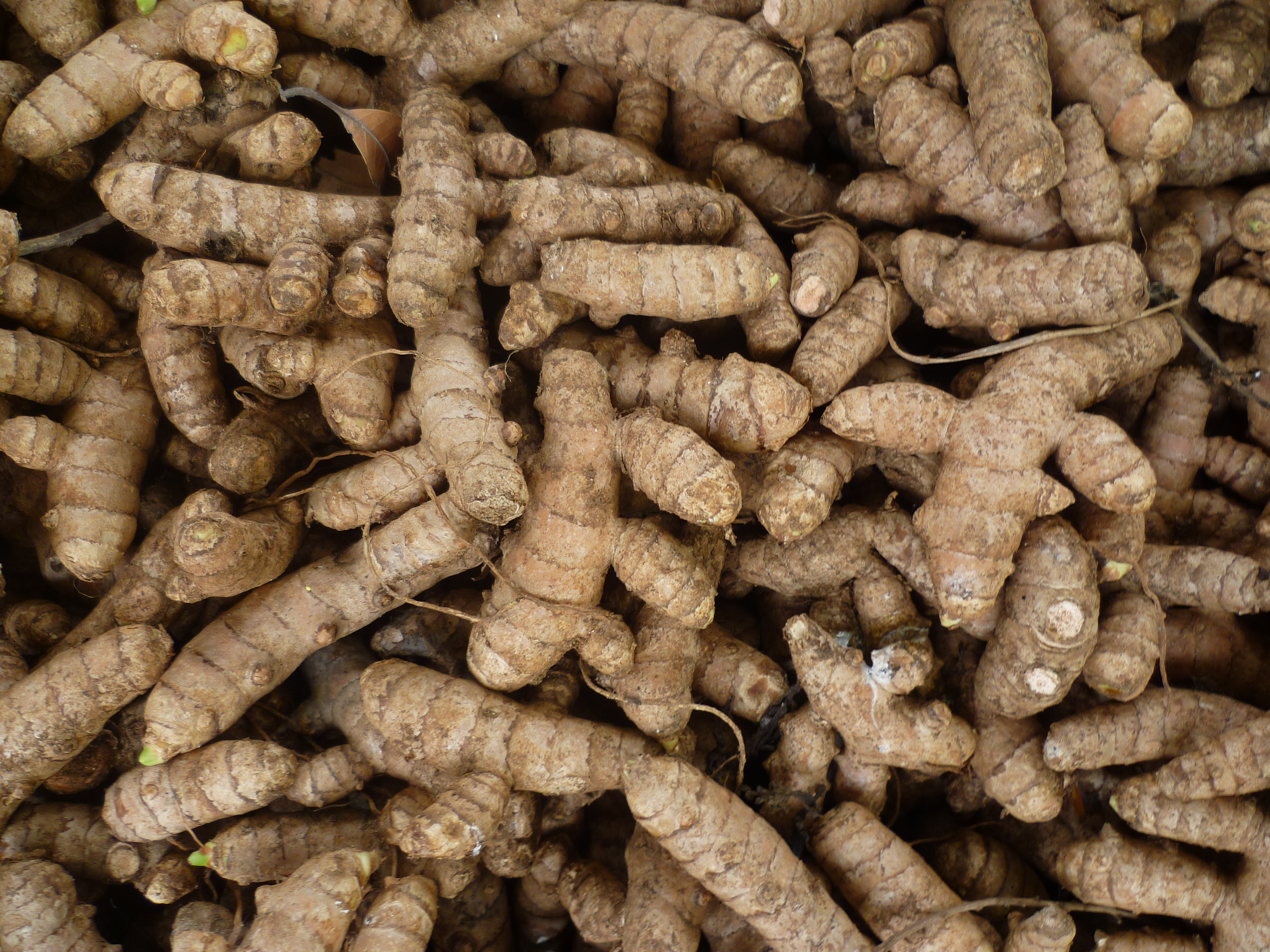
- Description: Turmeric cultivated and grown in Erode district
- Type: Agriculture produce
- Area: Erode district, Tamil Nadu
- Country: India
- Registered: 2018-19
- Material: Turmeric

Erode Turmeric or Erodu Manjal is a type of turmeric, a spice category which is grown in the Erode region of Tamil Nadu, India. It has been recognized as a Geographical indication by the Government of India in 2019. Erode turmeric is known for its high curcumin (>90%).

== Production ==
Among the two major varieties of turmeric, the Chinna Nadan variety is grown widely. Erode Turmeric occupies more than 70% of the turmeric grown in Erode and Coimbatore districts. As of 2021, the variety is grown in 50,000 acres across Tamil Nadu. The turmeric is exported to countries like Bangladesh, Malaysia, Singapore, UK, USA and the Middle East.

There are four (three in Erode, one in Gobichettipalayam) regulated markets for selling Erode turmeric in Erode district.

== Geographical indication ==
The Erode Turmeric Merchants Association applied for Geographical Indication recognition of Erode Turmeric through Government of Tamil Nadu. The Government of India recognized it as a Geographical indication officially in 2019.

== See also ==
- ETMA Turmeric Market Complex
- Bhavani Jamakkalam
- Coimbatore Wet Grinder
