= Arun Kumar Sahoo =

Indian politician

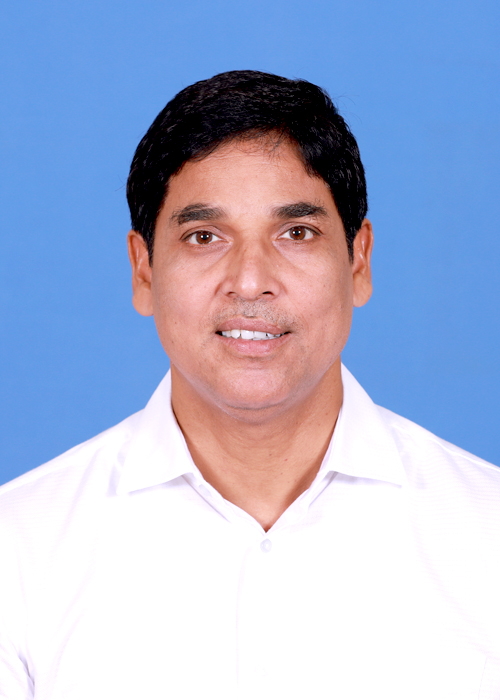

Member of Odisha Legislative Assembly
- Incumbent
- Assumed office 4 June 2024
- Preceded by: Arun Kumar Sahoo
- Constituency: Nayagarh

Personal details
- Party: Biju Janata Dal
- Profession: Politician

Arun Kumar Sahoo (born 6 June 1967) is an Indian politician from Odisha. He is a five time MLA from Nayagarh Assembly constituency in Nayagarh district. He last won in the 2024 Odisha Legislative Assembly election representing the Biju Janata Dal.

== Early life and education ==
Sahoo is from Daspalla, Nayagarh district, Odisha. He is the son of Dandadhar Sahoo. He completed his Ph.D. in history in 2013 at North Odisha University, Sriram Chandra Vihar, Baripada. Earlier, he did his M.A. at Utkal University Vani Vihar, Bhubaneshwar in 1990 and later, completed L.L.B. at Vani Vihar Law College, also in Bhubaneshwar in 1993.

== Career ==
Sahoo won from Nayagarh Assembly constituency representing Biju Janata Dal in the 2024 Odisha Legislative Assembly election. He polled 81,959 votes and defeated his nearest rival, Pratyusha Rajeshwari Singh of Bharatiya Janata Party, by a narrow margin of 439 votes. Earlier, he first became an MLA winning the 2004 Odisha Legislative Assembly election and went on to win the next four elections in 2009, 2014, 2019 and 2024. In 2019, he polled 81,592 votes and defeated his nearest rival, Irani Ray of Bharatiya Janata Party, by a margin of 14,855 votes. In 2014, he polled 75,538 votes and defeated Lala Manoj Kumar Ray of Indian National Congress, by a margin of 20,867 votes. In 2009, he polled 67,100 votes and defeated Hemendra Chandra Singh, an independent candidate, by a margin of 27,341 votes.
