= 16th Lok Sabha =

Lower House members elected in 2014

| ← | 15th | 17th | → |
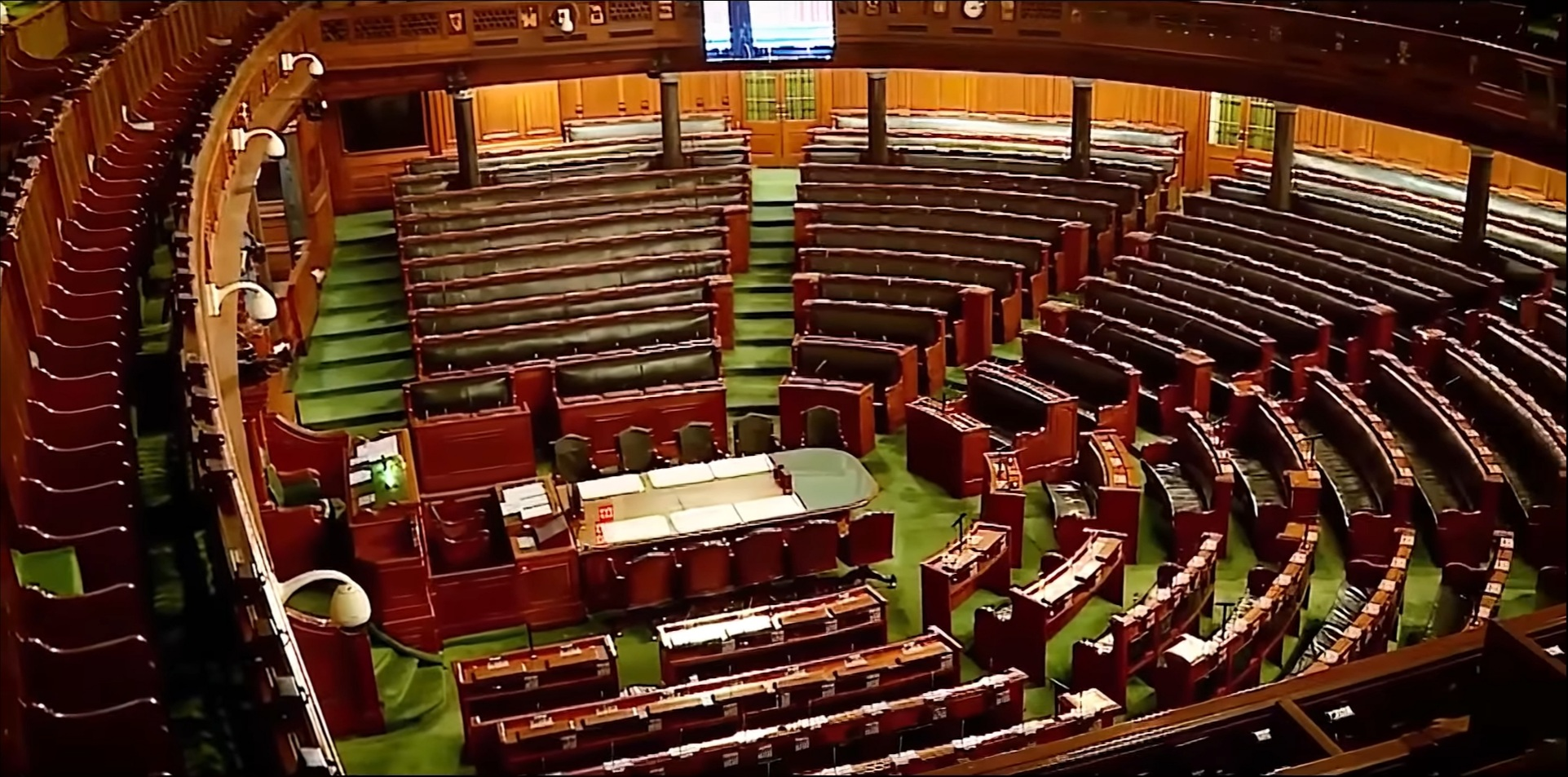
- View of Lok Sabha chamber in the Old Parliament House, New Delhi

Overview
- Legislative body: Indian Parliament
- Term: 4 June 2014 - 24 May 2019
- Election: 2014 Indian general election
- Government: First Modi ministry

Sovereign
- President: Pranab Mukherjee; Ram Nath Kovind
- Vice President: Hamid Ansari; M. Venkaiah Naidu

House of the People
- Members: 543
- Speaker of the House: Sumitra Mahajan
- Leader of the House: Narendra Modi
- Prime Minister: Narendra Modi
- Leader of the Opposition: Vacant (Note: Mallikarjun Kharge served as the Leader of the Indian National Congress Party in the Lok Sabha. There was no official opposition, as no opposition party received at least 55 seats. The INC had a plurality (44) seats in the chamber, however.)
- Party control: National Democratic Alliance

Members of the 16th Lok Sabha were elected during the 2014 Indian general election. The elections were conducted in 9 phases from 7 April 2014 to 12 May 2014 by the Election Commission of India. The results of the election were declared on 16 May 2014.

The Bharatiya Janata Party (of the NDA) achieved an absolute majority with 282 seats out of 543, 166 seats more than in the previous 15th Lok Sabha. Its PM candidate Narendra Modi took office on 26 May 2014 as the 14th prime minister of India. The first session was convened from 4 to 11 June 2014.

There was the leader of the opposition in the 16th Lok Sabha as the Indian Parliament rules state that a party in the Lok Sabha must have at least 10% (55) of the total seats (545) to be considered the opposition party. The Indian National Congress (of the UPA) could only manage 44 seats, while the All India Anna Dravida Munnetra Kazhagam party from Tamil Nadu came a close third with 37 seats. Mallikarjun Kharge was declared the leader of the Indian National Congress in the Lok Sabha.

Five sitting members from Rajya Sabha, the Upper House of Indian Parliament, were elected to 16th Lok Sabha after the 2014 Indian general election.

The pro-tem Speaker Kamal Nath was administered oath on 4 June 2014 & presided over the election of the Speaker of the Lok Sabha. Sumitra Mahajan was elected as its Speaker on 6 June 2014 and would remain in office until the day before the first sitting of the 17th Lok Sabha. M Thambidurai was elected as Deputy Speaker on 13 August 2014.

== Members ==
- Speaker: Sumitra Mahajan, BJP
- Deputy Speaker: M. Thambidurai, AIADMK
- Secretary-General: Snehlata Shrivastava
- Leader of the House: Narendra Modi, BJP
- Leader of the Opposition: Mallikarjun Kharge, INC

=== Party-wise Distribution of Seats ===
Following 36 political parties were represented in 16th Lok Sabha:

| Party | Abbr. | Seats | Leader in Lok Sabha |
|---|---|---|---|
| Bharatiya Janata Party | BJP | 282 | Narendra Modi |
| Indian National Congress | INC | 44 | Mallikarjun Kharge |
| All India Anna Dravida Munnetra Kazhagam | AIADMK | 37 | Ponnusamy Venugopal |
| All India Trinamool Congress | AITC | 34 | Sudip Bandyopadhyay |
| Biju Janata Dal | BJD | 18 | Bhartruhari Mahtab |
| Shiv Sena | SS | 18 | Anant Geete |
| Telugu Desam Party | TDP | 15 | Thota Narasimham |
| Telangana Rashtra Samithi | TRS | 11 | A. P. Jithender Reddy |
| Communist Party of India (Marxist) | CPI(M) | 9 | P. Karunakaran |
| Samajwadi Party | SP | 5 | Mulayam Singh Yadav |
| Lok Janshakti Party | LJP | 6 | Ram Vilas Paswan |
| Nationalist Congress Party | NCP | 6 | Supriya Sule |
| Aam Aadmi Party | AAP | 4 | Bhagwant Mann |
| Rashtriya Janata Dal | RJD | 4 | Jay Prakash Narayan Yadav |
| Shiromani Akali Dal | SAD | 4 | Ranjit Singh Brahmpura |
| YSR Congress Party | YSRCP | 8 | Mekapati Rajamohan Reddy |
| All India United Democratic Front | AIUDF | 3 | Badruddin Ajmal |
| Independents | IND | 3 | - |
| Rashtriya Lok Samta Party | RLSP | 3 | Upendra Kushwaha |
| Apna Dal | AD | 2 | Anupriya Patel |
| Indian National Lok Dal | INLD | 2 | Charanjeet Singh Rori |
| Indian Union Muslim League | IUML | 2 | E. T. Mohammed Basheer |
| Janata Dal (Secular) | JD(S) | 2 | H. D. Deve Gowda |
| Janata Dal (United) | JD(U) | 2 | Kaushalendra Kumar |
| Jharkhand Mukti Morcha | JMM | 2 | Shibu Soren |
| All India Majlis-e-Ittehadul Muslimeen | AIMIM | 1 | Asaduddin Owaisi |
| All India N.R. Congress | AINRC | 1 | R. Radhakrishnan |
| Communist Party of India | CPI | 1 | C. N. Jayadevan |
| Jammu & Kashmir National Conference | JKNC | 1 | Farooq Abdullah |
| Jammu and Kashmir Peoples Democratic Party | JKPDP | 1 | Muzaffar Hussain Baig |
| Nationalist Democratic Progressive Party | NDPP | 1 | Tokheho Yepthomi |
| Pattali Makkal Katchi | PMK | 1 | Anbumani Ramadoss |
| Rashtriya Lok Dal | RLD | 1 | Begum Tabassum Hasan |
| Revolutionary Socialist Party | RSP | 1 | N. K. Premachandran |
| Sikkim Democratic Front | SDF | 1 | Prem Das Rai |
| Swabhimani Paksha | SWP | 1 | Raju Shetti |
| Nominated Anglo-Indians (Bharatiya Janata Party) | NOM | 2 | Richard Hay and George Baker |
| Vacant | | 26 (Anantnag, Ongole, Kadapa, Nellore, Tirupati, Rajampet, Kottayam, Kendrapara, Tura, Katihar, Begusarai, Bangalore South, Wayanad, Kishanganj, Ladakh, Malkajgiri, Peddapalle, Chhindwara, Durg, Khajuraho, Dewas, Ajmer, Dausa, Aska, Viluppuram and Jadavpur) | |

=== Criminal background ===
Case-wise distribution of the 542 members of the 16th Lok Sabha.
1. With serious criminal cases 33.68 (29.8%)
2. With non-serious criminal cases 13.47 (11.9%)
3. Without any criminal cases 66 (58.3%)

About one-third of all winners had at least one pending criminal case against them, with some having serious criminal cases.

^{*} Criteria for "serious" criminal cases:

1. Offence for which maximum punishment is of 5 years or more.
2. If an offense is non-bailable.
3. If it is an electoral offense (e.g. IPC 171E or bribery).
4. Offence related to loss to the exchequer.
5. Offences that are assault, murder, kidnap, rape-related.
6. Offences that are mentioned in the Representation of the People Act (Section 8).
7. Offences under the Prevention of Corruption Act.
8. Crimes against women.

Compared to the 15th Lok Sabha, there was an increase of members with criminal cases. In 2009, 158 (30%) of the 521 members analysed had criminal cases, of which 77 (15%) had serious criminal cases.

=== Financial background ===
Asset-wise distribution of the 543 members in the 16th Lok Sabha.
1. Assets > ₹10 crore (US$1.1 million) (24.4%)
2. Assets between ₹5 crore (US$530,000) and ₹10 crore (US$1.1 million) (12.9%)
3. Assets between ₹1 crore (US$110,000) and ₹5 crore (US$530,000) (44.5%)
4. Assets < ₹1 crore (US$110,000) (18.3%)

As of May 2014, out of the 542 members analysed, 443 (82%) are having assets of ₹1 crore (US$110,000) or more. In the 15th Lok Sabha, out of 521 members analysed, 300 (58%) members had assets of ₹1 crore (US$110,000) or more.

The average assets per member are ₹14.7 crore (US$1.6 million) (in 2009, this figure was ₹5.35 crore (US$570,000)).

| Political party | No. of members | Average assets per member |
|---|---|---|
| BJP | 281 | ₹11.5 crore (US$1.2 million) |
| INC | 44 | ₹13.2 crore (US$1.4 million) |
| AIADMK | 37 | ₹6.4 crore (US$680,000) |
| AITC | 34 | ₹2.5 crore (US$270,000) |
| Others | 146 | ₹25.0 crore (US$2.7 million) |
| Total | 542 (Excluding Speaker) | ₹14.7 crore (US$1.6 million) |

=== Age ===
Age-wise distribution of the 542 members in the 16th Lok Sabha as of 16 May 2018

| Age Group | No. of members |
|---|---|
| Age> 80 | 8 |
| Age between 71 and 80 | 53 |
| Age between 61 and 70 | 161 |
| Age between 51 and 60 | 164 |
| Age between 41 and 50 | 103 |
| Age <= 40 | 46 |

== Membership by party ==
No. of Lok Sabha MP's partywise :
(As on 23 May 2019)

| Alliance | Party | No. of MPs | Leader of the Party |
|---|---|---|---|
| National Democratic Alliance; Seats: 353 | BJP | 282 | Narendra Modi |
| National Democratic Alliance; Seats: 353 | AIADMK | 37 | P. Venugopal |
| National Democratic Alliance; Seats: 353 | SS | 18 | Vinayak Raut |
| National Democratic Alliance; Seats: 353 | SAD | 4 | Harsimrat Kaur Badal |
| National Democratic Alliance; Seats: 353 | JD(U) | 2 | Kaushalendra Kumar |
| National Democratic Alliance; Seats: 353 | LJP | 6 | Ram Vilas Paswan |
| National Democratic Alliance; Seats: 353 | AD(S) | 2 | Anupriya Patel |
| National Democratic Alliance; Seats: 353 | NDPP | 1 | T.Yepthomi |
| National Democratic Alliance; Seats: 353 | SDF | 1 | Prem Das Rai |
| National Democratic Alliance; Seats: 353 | Independent | 3 | |
| United Progressive Alliance; Seats: 78 | INC | 44 | Sonia Gandhi |
| United Progressive Alliance; Seats: 78 | TDP | 16 | K Ram Mohan Naidu |
| United Progressive Alliance; Seats: 78 | NCP | 5 | Supriya Sule |
| United Progressive Alliance; Seats: 78 | JKNC | 3 | Farooq Abdullah |
| United Progressive Alliance; Seats: 78 | IUML | 3 | E. T. Mohammed Basheer |
| United Progressive Alliance; Seats: 78 | JD(S) | 2 | H. D. Deve Gowda |
| United Progressive Alliance; Seats: 78 | JMM | 2 | Shibu Soren |
| United Progressive Alliance; Seats: 78 | RSP | 1 | Premchandran |
| Opposition - Others; Seats: 116 | | | |
| Opposition - Others; Seats: 116 | AITC | 34 | Sudhir Alkuntla |
| Opposition - Others; Seats: 116 | YSRCP | 8 | Midhun Reddy |
| Opposition - Others; Seats: 116 | BJD | 21 | Pinaki Misra |
| Opposition - Others; Seats: 116 | BRS | 11 | Nageswara Rao |
| Opposition - Others; Seats: 116 | SP | 5 | Mulayam Yadav |
| Opposition - Others; Seats: 116 | CPI(M) | 9 | |
| Opposition - Others; Seats: 116 | CPI | 1 | |
| Opposition - Others; Seats: 116 | AIMIM | 2 | A. Owaisi |
| Opposition - Others; Seats: 116 | AAP | 4 | Arvind Kejriwal |

== Bills ==
During the tenure of the 16th Lok Sabha, 21% of bills were referred to Parliamentary committees for examination

== Subsequent by-elections and vacancies ==
| State | Constituency | Name of elected M.P. | Party affiliation |
|---|---|---|---|
| Andhra Pradesh | Ongole | Y. V. Subba Reddy (resigned on 20 June 2018) | YSR Congress Party |
| Andhra Pradesh | Ongole | Vacant | |
| Andhra Pradesh | Kadapa | Y. S. Avinash Reddy (resigned on 20 June 2018) | YSR Congress Party |
| Andhra Pradesh | Kadapa | Vacant | |
| Andhra Pradesh | Nellore | Mekapati Rajamohan Reddy (resigned on 20 June 2018) | YSR Congress Party |
| Andhra Pradesh | Nellore | Vacant | |
| Andhra Pradesh | Tirupati | Varaprasad Rao Velagapalli (resigned on 20 June 2018) | YSR Congress Party |
| Andhra Pradesh | Tirupati | Vacant | |
| Andhra Pradesh | Rajampet | P. V. Midhun Reddy (resigned on 20 June 2018) | YSR Congress Party |
| Andhra Pradesh | Rajampet | Vacant | |
| Assam | Lakhimpur | Sarbananda Sonowal (resigned on 23 May 2016) | Bharatiya Janata Party |
| Assam | Lakhimpur | Pradan Baruah (elected on 22 November 2016) | Bharatiya Janata Party |
| Bihar | Araria | Mohammed Taslimuddin (died on 17 September 2017) | Rashtriya Janata Dal |
| Bihar | Araria | Sarfaraz Alam (elected on 14 March 2018) | Rashtriya Janata Dal |
| Bihar | Kishanganj | Mohammad Asrarul Haque (died on 7 December 2018) | Indian National Congress |
| Bihar | Kishanganj | Vacant | |
| Bihar | Katihar | Tariq Anwar (resigned on 28 September 2018) | Nationalist Congress Party |
| Bihar | Katihar | Vacant | |
| Bihar | Begusarai | Bhola Singh (died on 19 October 2018) | Bharatiya Janata Party |
| Bihar | Begusarai | Vacant | |
| Chhattisgarh | Durg | Tamradhwaj Sahu (resigned on 21 December 2018) | Indian National Congress |
| Chhattisgarh | Durg | Vacant | |
| Gujarat | Vadodara | Narendra Modi (resigned on 29 May 2014) | Bharatiya Janata Party |
| Gujarat | Vadodara | Ranjanben Bhatt (elected on 16 September 2014) | Bharatiya Janata Party |
| Jammu and Kashmir | Srinagar | Tariq Hameed Karra (resigned on 18 October 2016) | Jammu and Kashmir Peoples Democratic Party |
| Jammu and Kashmir | Srinagar | Farooq Abdullah (elected on 15 April 2017) | Jammu & Kashmir National Conference |
| Jammu and Kashmir | Anantnag | Mehbooba Mufti (resigned on 4 July 2016) | Jammu and Kashmir Peoples Democratic Party |
| Jammu and Kashmir | Anantnag | Vacant | |
| Jammu and Kashmir | Ladakh | Thupstan Chhewang (resigned on 13 December 2018) | Bharatiya Janata Party |
| Jammu and Kashmir | Ladakh | Vacant | |
| Karnataka | Bellary | B. Sriramulu (resigned on 18 May 2018) | Bharatiya Janata Party |
| Karnataka | Bellary | V. S. Ugrappa (elected on 6 November 2018) | Indian National Congress |
| Karnataka | Shimoga | B. S. Yeddyurappa (resigned on 18 May 2018) | Bharatiya Janata Party |
| Karnataka | Shimoga | B. Y. Raghavendra (elected on 6 November 2018) | Bharatiya Janata Party |
| Karnataka | Mandya | C. S. Puttaraju (resigned on 21 May 2018) | Janata Dal |
| Karnataka | Mandya | L. R. Shivarame Gowda (elected on 6 November 2018) | Janata Dal |
| Karnataka | Bangalore South | Ananth Kumar (died on 12 November 2018) | Bharatiya Janata Party |
| Karnataka | Bangalore South | Vacant | |
| Kerala | Wayanad | M. I. Shanavas (died on 21 November 2018) | Indian National Congress |
| Kerala | Wayanad | Vacant | |
| Kerala | Malappuram | E. Ahamed (died on 1 February 2017) | Indian Union Muslim League |
| Kerala | Malappuram | P. K. Kunhalikutty (elected on 17 April 2017) | Indian Union Muslim League |
| Kerala | Kottayam | Jose K. Mani (ceased on 14 June 2018) | Kerala Congress |
| Kerala | Kottayam | Vacant | |
| Madhya Pradesh | Khajuraho | Nagendra Singh (resigned on 21 December 2018) | Bharatiya Janata Party |
| Madhya Pradesh | Khajuraho | Vacant | |
| Madhya Pradesh | Shahdol | Dalpat Singh Paraste (died on 1 June 2016) | Bharatiya Janata Party |
| Madhya Pradesh | Shahdol | Gyan Singh (elected on 22 November 2016) | Bharatiya Janata Party |
| Madhya Pradesh | Chhindwara | Kamal Nath (resigned on 17 December 2018) | Indian National Congress |
| Madhya Pradesh | Chhindwara | Vacant | |
| Madhya Pradesh | Dewas | Manohar Untwal (resigned on 21 December 2018) | Bharatiya Janata Party |
| Madhya Pradesh | Dewas | Vacant | |
| Madhya Pradesh | Ratlam | Dileep Singh Bhuria (died on 24 June 2015) | Bharatiya Janata Party |
| Madhya Pradesh | Ratlam | Kantilal Bhuria (elected on 24 November 2015) | Indian National Congress |
| Maharashtra | Bhandara–Gondiya | Nanabhau Patole (resigned on 8 December 2017) | Bharatiya Janata Party |
| Maharashtra | Bhandara–Gondiya | Madhukar Kukde (elected on 31 May 2018) | Nationalist Congress Party |
| Maharashtra | Palghar | Chintaman Wanaga (died on 30 January 2018) | Bharatiya Janata Party |
| Maharashtra | Palghar | Rajendra Gavit (elected on 31 May 2018) | Bharatiya Janata Party |
| Maharashtra | Beed | Gopinath Munde (died on 3 June 2014) | Bharatiya Janata Party |
| Maharashtra | Beed | Pritam Munde (elected on 19 October 2014) | Bharatiya Janata Party |
| Meghalaya | Tura | P. A. Sangma (died on 4 March 2016) | National People's Party |
| Meghalaya | Tura | Conrad Sangma (elected on 19 May 2016 and resigned on 4 September 2018) | National People's Party |
| Meghalaya | Tura | Vacant | |
| Nagaland | Nagaland | Neiphiu Rio (resigned on 22 February 2018) | Naga People's Front |
| Nagaland | Nagaland | Tokheho Yepthomi (elected on 31 May 2018) | Nationalist Democratic Progressive Party |
| Odisha | Kandhamal | Hemendra Chandra Singh (died on 5 September 2014) | Biju Janata Dal |
| Odisha | Kandhamal | Pratyusha Rajeshwari Singh (elected on 19 October 2015) | Biju Janata Dal |
| Odisha | Kendrapara | Baijayant Panda (resigned on 18 July 2018) | Biju Janata Dal |
| Odisha | Kendrapara | Vacant | |
| Odisha | Aska | Ladu Kishore Swain (died on 6 February 2019) | Biju Janata Dal |
| Odisha | Aska | Vacant | |
| Punjab | Gurdaspur | Vinod Khanna (died on 27 April 2017) | Bharatiya Janata Party |
| Punjab | Gurdaspur | Sunil Jakhar (elected on 15 October 2017) | Indian National Congress |
| Punjab | Amritsar | Amarinder Singh (resigned on 23 November 2016) | Indian National Congress |
| Punjab | Amritsar | Gurjeet Singh Aujla (elected on 11 March 2017) | Indian National Congress |
| Rajasthan | Alwar | Chand Nath (died on 17 September 2017) | Bharatiya Janata Party |
| Rajasthan | Alwar | Karan Singh Yadav (elected on 1 February 2018) | Indian National Congress |
| Rajasthan | Dausa | Harish Meena (resigned on 24 December 2018) | Bharatiya Janata Party |
| Rajasthan | Dausa | Vacant | |
| Rajasthan | Ajmer | Sanwar Lal Jat (died on 9 August 2017) | Bharatiya Janata Party |
| Rajasthan | Ajmer | Raghu Sharma (elected on 1 February 2018 and resigned on 21 December 2018) | Indian National Congress |
| Rajasthan | Ajmer | Vacant | |
| Tamil Nadu | Viluppuram | S. Rajendran (died on 23 February 2019) | All India Anna Dravida Munnetra Kazhagam |
| Tamil Nadu | Viluppuram | Vacant | |
| Telangana | Peddapalle | Balka Suman (resigned on 17 December 2018) | Telangana Rashtra Samithi |
| Telangana | Peddapalle | Vacant | |
| Telangana | Medak | K. Chandrashekar Rao (resigned on 27 May 2014) | Telangana Rashtra Samithi |
| Telangana | Medak | Kotha Prabhakar Reddy (elected on 16 September 2014) | Telangana Rashtra Samithi |
| Telangana | Malkajgiri | Malla Reddy (resigned on 14 December 2018) | Indian National Congress |
| Telangana | Malkajgiri | Vacant | |
| Telangana | Warangal | Kadiyam Srihari (resigned on 11 June 2015) | Telangana Rashtra Samithi |
| Telangana | Warangal | Narendra Modi (elected on 24 November 2015) | Bharatiya Janata Party |
| Uttar Pradesh | Kairana | Hukum Singh (died on 3 February 2018) | Bharatiya Janata Party |
| Uttar Pradesh | Kairana | Begum Tabassum Hasan (elected on 31 May 2018) | Rashtriya Lok Dal |
| Uttar Pradesh | Mainpuri | Mulayam Singh Yadav (resigned on 29 May 2014) | Samajwadi Party |
| Uttar Pradesh | Mainpuri | Tej Pratap Singh Yadav (elected on 16 September 2014) | Samajwadi Party |
| Uttar Pradesh | Phulpur | Keshav Prasad Maurya (resigned on 21 September 2017) | Bharatiya Janata Party |
| Uttar Pradesh | Phulpur | Nagendra Pratap Singh Patel (elected on 14 March 2018) | Bharatiya Janata Party |
| Uttar Pradesh | Gorakhpur | Yogi Adityanath (resigned on 21 September 2017) | Bharatiya Janata Party |
| Uttar Pradesh | Gorakhpur | Praveen Kumar Nishad (elected on 14 March 2018) | Bharatiya Janata Party |
| West Bengal | Cooch Behar | Renuka Sinha (died on 17 August 2016) | All India Trinamool Congress |
| West Bengal | Cooch Behar | Parthapratim Roy (elected on 22 November 2016) | All India Trinamool Congress |
| West Bengal | Bangaon | Kapil Krishna Thakur (died on 13 October 2014) | All India Trinamool Congress |
| West Bengal | Bangaon | Mamata Thakur (elected on 16 February 2015) | All India Trinamool Congress |
| West Bengal | Jadavpur | Sugata Bose (resigned on 12 March 2019) | All India Trinamool Congress |
| West Bengal | Jadavpur | Vacant | |
| West Bengal | Uluberia | Sultan Ahmed (died on 4 September 2017) | All India Trinamool Congress |
| West Bengal | Uluberia | Sajda Ahmed (elected on 1 February 2018) | All India Trinamool Congress |
| West Bengal | Tamluk | Sudhir Alkuntla (resigned on 19 May 2016) | Bharatiya Janata Party |
| West Bengal | Tamluk | Dibyendu Adhikari (elected on 22 November 2016) | All India Trinamool Congress |
