= Kandhamal Lok Sabha constituency =

Constituency of the Indian parliament in Odisha

Coordinates: 20.177813°N 84.173564°E

Kandhamal OD-13
- Lok Sabha constituency
- Interactive Map Outlining Kandhamal Lok Sabha constituency

Constituency details
- Country: India
- Region: East India
- State: Odisha
- Assembly constituencies: Baliguda; G. Udayagiri; Phulbani; Kantamal; Boudh; Daspalla; Bhanjanagar
- Established: 2009
- Total electors: 13,40,580 (Note: as on 2024) (Note: as data published by election commission)
- Reservation: None

Member of Parliament
- 18th Lok Sabha
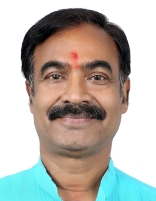
- Incumbent Sukanta Kumar Panigrahi
- Party: BJP
- Elected year: 2024

Kandhamal Lok Sabha constituency is one of the 21 Lok Sabha constituencies in Odisha state in eastern India. This constituency came into existence in 2008, following the implementation of delimitation of parliamentary constituencies based on the recommendations of the Delimitation Commission of India constituted in 2002.

== Assembly Segments ==
Kandhamal Lok Sabha constituency comprises 7 legislative assembly segments, which are:

#	Name	District	Member	Party	Leading (in 2024)
82	Baliguda (ST)	Kandhamal	Chakramani Kanhar	BJD	BJD
83	G. Udayagiri (ST)	Kandhamal	Prafulla Chandra Pradhan	INC	INC
84	Phulbani (ST)	Kandhamal	Uma Charan Mallick	BJP	BJD
85	Kantamal	Boudh	Kanhai Charan Danga	BJP	BJP
86	Boudh	Boudh	Saroj Kumar Pradhan	BJP	BJP
121	Daspalla (SC)	Nayagarh	Ramesh Chandra Behera	BJD	BJP
123	Bhanjanagar	Ganjam	Pradyumna Kumar Nayak	BJP	BJP

Baliguda, G. Udayagiri, Phulbani, Boudh and Bhanjanagar assembly segments were earlier in Phulbani constituency

== Elected members ==
Vote share of winning candidates
2024	41.80%
2019	49.01%
2014 (bypoll)	61.54%
2014	36.85%
2009	29.6%

Since its formation in 2009, 5 elections have been held till date including one bypoll in 2014.

List of members elected from Kandhamal constituency are:

Year	Member	Party
2009	Rudra Madhab Ray	Biju Janata Dal
2014	Hemendra Chandra Singh	Biju Janata Dal
2014 (bypoll) (Note: Death of Hemendra Chandra Singh)	Pratyusha Rajeshwari Singh	Biju Janata Dal
2019	Achyuta Samanta	Biju Janata Dal
2024	Sukanta Kumar Panigrahi	Bharatiya Janata Party

== Election Result ==
=== 2024 ===
Voting were held on 20th May 2024 in 5th phase of Indian General Election. Counting of votes was on 4th June 2024. In 2024 election, Bharatiya Janata Party candidate Sukanta Kumar Panigrahi defeated Biju Janata Dal candidate Achyutananda Samanta by a margin of 21,371 votes.

2024 Indian general election: Kandhamal
Party	Candidate	Votes	%	±%
BJP	Sukanta Kumar Panigrahi	416,415	41.80	
BJD	Achyutananda Samanta	3,95,044	39.66	
INC	Amir Chand Nayak	1,44,322	14.49	
NOTA	None of the above	15,720	1.58	
Majority		21,371	2.14	
Turnout		9,99,765	74.58	
BJP gain from BJD				

=== 2019 ===
In 2019 election, Biju Janata Dal candidate Achyutananda Samanta defeated Bharatiya Janata Party candidate Kharbela Swain by 1,49,216 votes.

2019 Indian general elections: Kandhamal
Party	Candidate	Votes	%	±%
BJD	Achyutananda Samanta	461,679	49.01	▼2.12
BJP	Kharbela Swain	3,12,463	33.17	▲20.22
INC	Manoj Kumar Acharya	1,38,993	14.76	▼13.88
BSP	Amir Nayak	7,314	0.78	
CPI(ML) Red Star	Tuna Mallick	8,283	0.88	
NOTA	None of the above	13,253	1.41	
Majority		1,49,216	15.84	
Turnout		9,42,041	73.10	
BJD hold				

=== 2014 Bypoll ===
Bye-election to the Kandhmal lok sabha constituency was held on 15 October 2014. In this election, Biju Janata Dal candidate Pratyusha Rajeshwari Singh defeated Bharatiya Janata Party candidate Rudra Madhab Ray by a margin of 2,98,868 votes.

2014 by-election: Kandhamal
Party	Candidate	Votes	%	±%
BJD	Pratyusha Rajeshwari Singh	477,529	61.54	▲11.33
BJP	Rudra Madhab Ray	1,78,661	23.02	▲10.07
INC	Abhimanyu Behera	90,536	11.66	▼16.98
NOTA	None of the above	11,053	1.42	▼0.26
Majority		2,98,868	38.52	▲16.96
Turnout		7,75,979	67.85	
BJD hold		Swing	+11.33	

=== 2014 ===
In 2014 election, Biju Janata Dal candidate Hemendra Chandra Singh defeated Indian National Congress candidate Harihar Karan by a margin of 1,81,017 votes.

2014 Indian general elections: Kandhamal
Party	Candidate	Votes	%	±%
BJD	Hemendra Chandra Singh	421,458	50.21	
INC	Harihar Karn	2,40,411	28.64	
BJP	Sukanta Kumar Panigrahi	1,08,744	12.95	
Independent	Lambodhar Kanhar	20,472	2.43	
BSP	Ram Nayak	11,080	1.32	
AAP	Narendra Mohanty	9,522	1.13	
AOP	Bilasini Nayak	7,741	0.92	
NOTA	None of the above	14,159	1.68	
Majority		1,81,017	21.56	
Turnout		8,39,796	73.43	
BJD hold				

=== 2009 ===
In 2009 election, Biju Janata Dal candidate Rudra Madhab Ray defeated Indian National Congress candidate Suzit Kumar Padhi by a margin of 1,51,007 votes.

2009 Indian general elections: Kandhamal
Party	Candidate	Votes	%	±%
BJD	Rudra Madhab Ray	315,314	29.6	
INC	Suzit Kumar Padhi	1,64,307	15.42	
BJP	Ashok Sahu	1,40,720	13.8	
Majority		1,51,007	14.18	
Turnout		7,07,748	66.44	
BJD win (new seat)				
