= Kesaibahal =

Village in Sambalpur district, Odisha, India

Kesaibahal is a village in Sambalpur district, Odisha, India. It is also one of the panchayats of Bamra block. The name Kesaibahal is of historical origins, where the Raja of erstwhile Bamanda state was awarded with the title of Knight Commandent of Indian Empire, by the British, thus the name KCIE of the land leading to the name Kesaibahal. Its geographical coordinates are 21° 55' 0" North, 84° 23' 0" East.The population of the village almost nears 4000 people. It's the main economical centre of the area. It also has a TPWODL grid S/S near Gudambuda, where both the plus 2 and plus 3 colleges are present. It lies along the Kuchinda to Bamra Road. Nearest railway station is Bamra which is about 28 km.

== Facilities ==
Compared to other nearby villages, Kesaibahal is a developed village. It has the following facilities:

- State Bank of India, Ifsc-code SBIN0009352.
- Gram panchayat
- Primary health centre for the purpose of treatment of nearby peoples.
- Kesaibahal Panchayat High School
- P.D.R College Kesaibahal
- B.G.Degree College
- Post office having Pin code 768228
- GREMS, Kesaibahal, English Medium Residential School
- Shree Automobiles, ARD Hero Moto Corp
- Mahindra showroom, rice plant transmissions
- Sajan cloth store
- M/S- Shruti Enterprises
- Connectivity to all the main roads.
- TPWODL grid S/S and electrical section office.
