= Unal, India =

Coordinates: 20.8400°N 84.3200°E

Unal a village in Boudh district, Odisha, a state in India.

== Population ==
The population was 434 at the 2008 census. According to the 2008 census, there are 91 households. There are 215 men and 219 women in the village.
