= Nayagarh Assembly constituency =

Constituency of the Odisha legislative assembly in India

Coordinates: 20.13°N 85.11°E

Nayagarh
- Constituency No. 122 for the Odisha Legislative Assembly
- Nayagarh Assembly constituency in Nayagarh district

Constituency details
- Country: India
- Region: East India
- State: Odisha
- Division: Central Division
- District: Nayagarh
- Lok Sabha constituency: Puri
- Established: 1951
- Total electors: 2,22,736 (Note: as on 2024) (Note: as data published by election commission)
- Reservation: None

Member of Legislative Assembly
- 17th Odisha Legislative Assembly
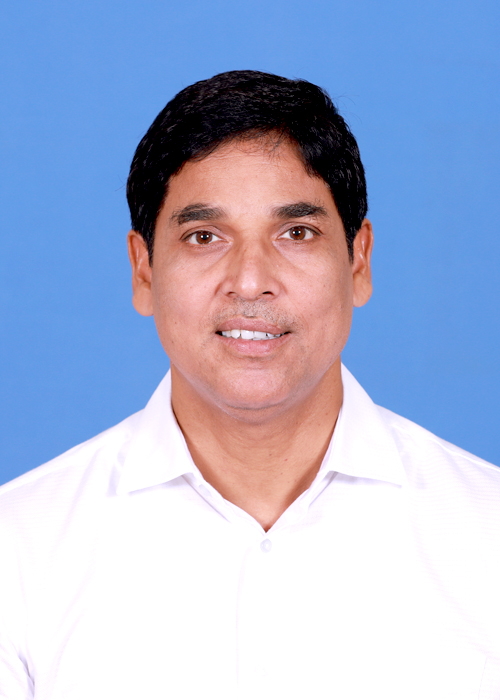
- Incumbent Arun Kumar Sahoo
- Party: Biju Janata Dal
- Elected year: 2024

Nayagarh is a Vidhan Sabha constituency of Nayagarh district, Odisha.

This constituency includes Nayagarh, Nayagarh block and 18 Gram panchayats (Sunamuhin, Panderipada, Giridipali, Kurala, Rabigadia, Pantikhari, Korapitha, Sakeri, Sardhapur, Bhadikila, Nandighora, Arada, Goudaput, Komanda, Rohibanka, Banthapur, Rabara, Ranganipatna and Odagaon nac of Odagaon Block).

== Elected members ==
Vote share of winning candidates
2024	48.74%
2019	52.41%
2014	52.78%
2009	54.25%
2004	49.24%
2002 (bypoll)	56.88%
2000	63.34%
1995	49.84%
1990	74.12%
1985	49.71%
1980	58.96%
1977	60.79%

Since its formation in 1951, 18 elections were held till date including one bypoll in 2002. Arun Kumar Sahoo won for the fifth consecutive time in the 2024 Odisha Legislative Assembly election.

List of members elected from Nayagarh constituency are:

Year	Member	Party
2024	Arun Kumar Sahoo	Biju Janata Dal
2019	Arun Kumar Sahoo	Biju Janata Dal
2014	Arun Kumar Sahoo	Biju Janata Dal
2009	Arun Kumar Sahoo	Biju Janata Dal
2004	Arun Kumar Sahoo	Biju Janata Dal
2002 (bypoll) (Note: Death of Bhagabat Behera)	Mandakini Behera	Biju Janata Dal
2000	Bhagabat Behera	Biju Janata Dal
1995	Sitakanta Mishra	Indian National Congress
1990	Bhagabat Behera	Janata Dal
1985	Bhagabat Behera	Janata Party
1980	Banshidhar Sahoo	Indian National Congress (I)
1977	Bhagabat Behera	Janata Party
1974	Bhagabat Behera	Socialist Party
1971	Achyutananda Mohanty	Utkal Congress
1967	Achyutananda Mohanty	Independent politician
1961	Brundaban Chandra Singh	Indian National Congress
1957	Raja Saheb Krushna Chandra Singh Mandhata	Independent politician
1951	Raja Saheb Krushna Chandra Singh Mandhata	Independent politician

== Election results ==
=== 2024 ===
Voting was held on 25 May 2024 in 3rd phase of Odisha Assembly Election & 6th phase of Indian General Election. Counting of votes was on 4 June 2024. In 2024 election, Biju Janata Dal candidate Arun Kumar Sahoo defeated Bharatiya Janata Party candidate Pratyusha Rajeshwari Singh by a margin of 439 votes.

2024 Odisha Vidhan Sabha Election, Nayagarh
Party	Candidate	Votes	%	±%
BJD	Arun Kumar Sahoo	81,959	48.74	▼3.67
BJP	Pratyusha Rajeshwari Singh	81,520	48.48	▲5.61
INC	Ranajeet Dash	2,650	1.58	▼1.14
NOTA	None of the above	964	0.57	
Majority		439	0.30	
Turnout		1,68,152	75.49	
BJD hold				

=== 2019 ===
In 2019 election, Biju Janata Dal candidate Arun Kumar Sahoo defeated Bharatiya Janata Party candidate Irani Ray by a margin of 14,948 votes.

2019 Vidhan Sabha Election, Nayagarh
Party	Candidate	Votes	%	±%
BJD	Arun Kumar Sahoo	81,548	52.41	▼0.37
BJP	Irani Ray	66,600	42.87	▲37.62
INC	Manoj Kumar Sahoo	4,221	2.72	▼35.48
NOTA	None of the above	916	0.59%	
Majority		14,948	9.54	
Turnout		1,55,496	72	NIL
BJD hold				

=== 2014 ===
In 2014 election, Biju Janata Dal candidate Arun Kumar Sahoo defeated Indian National Congress candidate Lala Manoj Kumar Ray by a margin of 20,867 votes.

2014 Vidhan Sabha Election, Nayagarh
Party	Candidate	Votes	%	±%
BJD	Arun Kumar Sahoo	75,538	52.78	▼1.47
INC	Lala Manoj Kumar Ray	54,671	38.2	▲34.99
BJP	Pradipta Jena	7,521	5.25	1.31
NOTA	None of the above	883	0.62	−
Majority		20,867	14.57	−
Turnout		1,43,123	74.15	▲6.41
Registered electors		1,93,031		
BJD hold				

=== 2009 ===
In 2009 election, Biju Janata Dal candidate Arun Kumar Sahoo defeated Independent candidate Hemendra Chandra Singh by a margin of 27,341 votes.

2009 Vidhan Sabha Election, Nayagarh
Party	Candidate	Votes	%	±%
BJD	Arun Kumar Sahoo	67,100	54.25	−
Independent	Hemendra Chandra Singh	39,759	32.15	−
BJP	Jugansu Sekhar Panda	4,878	3.94	−
INC	Sandhya Mohapatra	3,967	3.21	−
Independent	Lala Manoj Kumar Ray	3,760	3.04	−
Majority		27,341	22.11 (Note: % of total valid votes)	−
Turnout		1,32,686	67.74 (Note: 2004 voter turnout was 64.05%)	▲3.69
BJD hold				
