= Bamanda =

Coordinates: 22°04′N 75°33′E

Bamanda is a village near Boudh in Boudh district of Odisha state of India. The Naikpada Cave (Patali Srikshetra) is very close to Bamanda.
