= 2015 Budget of Odisha =

Odisha State Budget
- Submitted: 16 February 2015
- Submitted by: Pradip Kumar Amat, Finance Minister of Odisha
- Parliament: Odisha Legislative Assembly
- Party: Biju Janata Dal (BJD)
- Total revenue: ₹ 70,940 Crore
- Total expenditures: ₹ 84,487.77 Crore
- Surplus: ₹ 5,101.51 Crore
- Deficit: ₹ 10,400 Crore

The Odisha State Budget for 2015–2016 was presented by Finance Minister of Odisha, Pradip Kumar Amat on 16 February 2015 in Odisha Legislative Assembly. Finance Minister Pradip Kumar Amat presented the Odisha Annual State Budget of ₹ 84,487.77 Crore with total revenue expenditure estimated at ₹ 65,838.99.

== Budgets ==
=== Budget Estimates ===
- Total Plan Outlay - ₹ 84,487.77 Crore
- Non-Plan Expenditure - ₹ 43,956.32 Crore
- Planning Expenditure - ₹ 44,150 Crore
- Government Expenses - ₹ 40,150 Crore
- General Enterprises - ₹ 4,000 Crore
- Revenue Collection - ₹ 70,940 Crore
- Revenue Surplus - ₹ 5,101.51 Crore
- Total Revenue Expenditure - ₹ 65,838.99 Crore
- Fiscal Deficit - ₹ 10,400 Crore (2.99% of GSDP)

=== Special Budgets ===
==== Nabakalebara ====
- Nabakalebara Expenses - ₹ 20 Crore
- Tourism Police - ₹ 3 Crore
- Jagannath Temple, Odisha – ₹ 5 Crore
- Uninterrupted Power Supply to Puri - ₹ 67 Crore
- Free Travel from Malatipatna to Puri - ₹ 40 Lakh.

==== Others ====
- Biju Krushak Kalyan Yojana - ₹ 90 Crore
- Corpus Fund for Fertilizer - ₹ 100 Crore
- Disaster Prevention Power Mechanism in Bhubaneswar - ₹ 50 Crore
- Jal Nidhi Yojana - ₹ 160 Crore
- Modernisation of Odisha Police Force - ₹ 120 Crore
- Puri Nabakalebar Festival 2015 - ₹ 20.5 Crore
- Odisha Potato Mission - ₹ 50 Crore
- Odisha Tourism Police - ₹ 3 Crore
- Power Infrastructure in Puri - ₹ 67 Crore
- Power Restoration in Berhampur, Gopalpur - ₹ 210 Crore
- Power Sector - ₹ 1,187.20 Crore
- Re 1 Rice Scheme - ₹ 1,402.99 Crore
- Udyan Krushi Yojana - ₹ 128 Crore

== Agriculture and Allied Sectors ==
- Finance Minister of Odisha, Pradip Kumar Amat presented the budget for agriculture and allied sectors with a plan outlay of ₹ 10,903.62 Crore.

== Healthcare Sector ==
- Finance Minister of Odisha, Pradip Kumar Amat presented the budget for Healthcare Sector with a plan outlay of ₹ 3,855 Crore.

== Higher Education ==
- Finance Minister of Odisha, Pradip Kumar Amat presented the budget for Higher Education with a plan outlay of ₹ 1,989.11 Crore.

== School and Mass Education ==
- Finance Minister of Odisha, Pradip Kumar Amat presented the budget for School and Mass Education with a plan outlay of ₹ 9979.49 Crore.

== Women & Child Welfare ==
- Finance Minister of Odisha, Pradip Kumar Amat presented the budget for Women & Child Welfare with a plan outlay of ₹ 4,160 Crore.

== Budget 2015–16: Pradip Kumar Amat ==
- "Total non-plan expenditure is estimated at Rs 43,956.32 crore in 2015–16, while state's annual plan outlay has been fixed at Rs 44,150 crore."
- "This is the largest allocation among all departments and constitutes about 12 per cent of the total budgetary allocation."

== See also ==
- Odisha
- Economy of Odisha
