= Boudhagada =

- Town
- Location in Odisha, India Boudhagada (India)
- Coordinates: 20.84°N 84.32°E
- Country: India
- State: Odisha
- District: Boudh

Government
  - Type: Municipality
  - Body: Boudhagada Municipal Council

Population (2011)
  - Total: 20,424

Languages
  - Local: Odia
- Time zone: UTC+5:30 (IST)
- Postal code: 762014
- Vehicle registration: OD-27
- Website: boudh.nic.in

Boudhagada (formerly Boudhgarh), is a town and a Municipality in Boudh district in the state of Odisha, India. The district headquarters also situated in this town. It is located on the bank of Mahanadi.

== Geography ==
Boudhagada is located at 20.84°N 84.32°E.

== Demographics ==
As of 2011 India census, Boudhgarh had a population of 20,424, with 52% males and 48% females. Boudhgarh has an average literacy rate of 72%, higher than the national average of 59.5%; with 58% of the males and 42% of females literate. 12% of the population is under 6 years of age.

== Politics ==
The current MLA from Boudh Assembly constituency is Saroj Kumar Pradhan of the BJP. Former MLA Pradip Kumar Amat of BJD was the Speaker in Odisha Legislative Assembly from 2009 - 2014. He was also the former finance minister of Odisha. He won the seat in State elections of 2019, 2014, 2009 and 2004, and as an independent candidate in 2000. Previous MLAs from this constituency include Sachidananda Dalal of JD who won this seat in 1995 and 1990, Sujit Kumar Padhi of INC in 1985, Himanshu Sekhar Pandhi of INC(I) in 1980, and Natabar Pradhan of JNP in 1977.

Boudhagada is part of Kandhamal Lok Sabha constituency.

== See also ==
- Baudh State

== Bibliography ==
- Bailey, F. G. (1963). Politics and Social Change in Orissa. Berkeley: University of California Press.
- Pasayat, C. (1998), Tribe, Caste and Folkculture, Jaipur/New Delhi: Rawat Publications.
- Pasayat, C. (2003), Glimpses of Tribal and Folkculture, New Delhi: Anmol Pub. Pvt. Ltd.
- Pasayat, C. (2007), Tribe, Caste and Society, New Delhi: Mohit Publications.
- Pasayat, C. (2007), History of Tribal Society and Culture, New Delhi: Zenith Books International.
- Pasayat, C. (2007), Tribal Non-tribal Divide: Myth and Reality, Bhubaneswar.
- Pasayat, C. (2008), Oral Tradition, Society and History, New Delhi: Mohit Publications.
- Pasayat, C. (2008), Paschima Odisara Lokageeta (in Oriya), Bhubaneswar: Folklore Foundation.
- Pasayat, C. and Sudam Naik (2008), Subarnapur Darbari Sahitya (in Oriya), Bhubaneswar: Gyanajuga Publications.
- Parishada, O. S. (1995). Studies in Buddhism. Institute of Orissan Culture.
