= Daspalla Assembly constituency =

Constituency of the Odisha legislative assembly in India

Coordinates: 20.33°N 84.85°E

Daspalla
- Constituency No. 121 for the Odisha Legislative Assembly
- Daspalla Assembly Constituency in Nayagarh district

Constituency details
- Country: India
- Region: East India
- State: Odisha
- District: Nayagarh
- Lok Sabha constituency: Kandhamal
- Established: 1951
- Total electors: 1,90,742 (Note: as on 2024) (Note: as data published by election commission)
- Reservation: SC

Member of Legislative Assembly
- 17th Odisha Legislative Assembly
- Incumbent Ramesh Chandra Behera
- Party: Biju Janata Dal
- Elected year: 2024

Daspalla is a Vidhan Sabha constituency of Nayagarh district, Odisha.

This constituency includes Daspalla block, Gania block and Nuagaon block.

== Elected members ==
Vote share of winning candidates
2024	44.40%
2019	58.44%
2014	65.46%
2009	47.60%
2004	34.20%
2000	35.08%
1997 (bypoll)	43.92%
1995	46.51%
1990	62.79%
1985	57.92%
1980	56.25%
1977	34.96%

Since its formation in 1951, 19 elections were held till date including in two bypoll in 1960 & 1997. It was a 2-member constituency in 1957.

List of members elected from Daspalla constituency are:

Year	Member	Party
2024	Ramesh Chandra Behera	Biju Janata Dal
2019	Ramesh Chandra Behera	Biju Janata Dal
2014	Purna Chandra Nayak	Biju Janata Dal
2009	Kashinath Mallik	Biju Janata Dal
2004	Rudra Madhab Ray	Independent politician
2000	Harihar Karan	Indian National Congress
1997 (bypoll) (Note: Resignation of Rudra Madhab Ray)	Harihar Karan	Independent politician
1995	Rudra Madhab Ray	Janata Dal
1990	Rudra Madhab Ray	Janata Dal
1985	Harihar Karan	Indian National Congress
1980	Harihar Karan	Indian National Congress
1977	Harihar Karan	Indian National Congress
1974	Harihar Karan	Independent politician
1971	Saheb Naik	Indian National Congress (R)
1967	Bhabagrahi Nayak	Swatantra Party
1961	Saheb Naik	Indian National Congress
1960 (bypoll) (Note: Death of Rajabahadur Kishore Chandra Deo Bhanj)	Raja Purna Chandra Bhanjadeo	Indian National Congress
1957 (Note: It was a 2 member constituency)	Sridhar Naik	Ganatantra Parishad
1957	Rajabahadur Kishore Chandra Deo Bhanj	Indian National Congress
1951	Rajabahadur Kishore Chandra Deo Bhanj	Indian National Congress

== Election results ==
=== 2024 ===
Voting were held on 20 May 2024 in 2nd phase of Odisha Assembly Election & 5th phase of Indian General Election. Counting of votes was on 4 June 2024. In 2024 election, Biju Janata Dal candidate Ramesh Chandra Behera defeated Bharatiya Janata Party candidate Raghab Malik by a margin of 35,291 votes.

2024 Odisha Vidhan Sabha Election, Daspalla
Party	Candidate	Votes	%	±%
BJD	Ramesh Chandra Behera	62,039	44.40	▼14.04
BJP	Raghav Mallick	55,743	39.89	▲8.95
Independent	Rabindra Sethi	10,673	7.64	
INC	Nakul Nayak	5,259	3.76	▼2.43
NOTA	None of the above	1,570	1.12	▲0.18
Majority		6,296	4.53	
Turnout		1,39,737	73.26	
BJD hold				

=== 2019 ===
In 2019 election, Biju Janata Dal candidate Ramesh Chandra Behera defeated Bharatiya Janata Party candidate Purna Chandra Nayak by a margin of 35,291 votes.

2019 Vidhan Sabha Election, Daspalla
Party	Candidate	Votes	%	±%
BJD	Ramesh Chandra Behera	75,006	58.44	
BJP	Purna Chandra Nayak	39,715	30.94	
INC	Prashanta Kumar Naik	7,949	6.19	
NOTA	None of the above	1,208	0.94	
Majority		35,291	27.5	
Turnout		1,28,349	67.62	
BJD hold				

=== 2014 ===
In 2014 election, Biju Janata Dal candidate Purna Chandra Nayak defeated Indian National Congress candidate Indumati Nayak by a margin of 57,327 votes.

2014 Vidhan Sabha Election, Daspalla
Party	Candidate	Votes	%	±%
BJD	Purna Chandra Nayak	75,832	65.46	▲6.18
INC	Indumati Nayak	18,505	15.97	▼5.73
BJP	Pramoda Kumar Behera	16,053	13.86	▲1.04
NOTA	None of the above	1,840	1.59	−
Majority		57,327	49.48	▲11.9
Turnout		1,15,845	68.67	▲4.18
Registered electors		1,68,709		
BJD hold				

=== 2009 ===
In 2009 election, Biju Janata Dal candidate Kashinath Mallick defeated Indian National Congress candidate Lecturer Bullion by a margin of 38,758 votes.

2009 Vidhan Sabha Election, Daspalla
Party	Candidate	Votes	%	±%
BJD	Kashinath Mallik	61,142	59.28	−
INC	Lecturer Bullion	22,384	21.70	−
BJP	Manoj Kumar Behera	13,218	12.82	−
Majority		38,758	37.58 (Note: %of total valid votes)	−
Turnout		1,03,143	64.49 (Note: 2004 Voter turnout was 64.90%)	▼0.41
BJD gain from Independent				
