= Baliguda Assembly constituency =

Constituency of the Odisha legislative assembly in India

Coordinates: 20.20°N 83.91°E

Baliguda
- Constituency No. 82 for the Odisha Legislative Assembly

Constituency details
- Country: India
- Region: East India
- State: Odisha
- Division: Southern Division
- District: Kandhamal
- Lok Sabha constituency: Kandhamal
- Established: 1951
- Total electors: 1,65,501 (Note: as on 2024) (Note: as data published by election commission)
- Reservation: ST

Member of Legislative Assembly
- 17th Odisha Legislative Assembly
- Incumbent Chakramani Kanhar
- Party: Biju Janata Dal
- Elected year: 2024

Baliguda is a Vidhan Sabha constituency of Kandhamal district, Odisha.

Area of this constituency includes Baliguda, Baliguda block, K. Nuagaon block, Kotagarh block and Tumudibandh block.

== Elected members ==
Vote share of winning candidates
2024	35.88%
2014	39.23%
2014	37.25%
2009	33.11%
2004	35.42%
2000	36.38%
1995	37.40%
1990	53.46%
1985	58.43%
1980	44.80%
1977	47.23%

Since its formation in 1951, 17 elections were held till date.

List of members elected from Baliguda constituency are:

Year	Member	Party
2024	Chakramani Kanhar	Biju Janata Dal
2019	Chakramani Kanhar	Biju Janata Dal
2014	Rajib Patra	Biju Janata Dal
2009	Karendra Majhi	Bharatiya Janata Party
2004	Karendra Majhi	Bharatiya Janata Party
2000	Surendra Kanhar	Bharatiya Janata Party
1995	Sahura Mallick	Indian National Congress
1990	Bhagaban Kanhar	Janata Dal
1985	Laxmi Kanta Mallik	Indian National Congress
1980	Sahura Mallick	Indian National Congress (I)
1977	Sadananda Konhar	Independent politician
1974	Sahura Mallick	Indian National Congress
1971	Naresh Pradhan	Swatantra Party
1967	Naresh Pradhan	Swatantra Party
1961	Dubura Podra	Swatantra Party
1957	Lokanath Patra	Ganatantra Parishad
1951	Jadab Padra	Indian National Congress

== Election results ==
=== 2024 ===
Voting were held on 20 May 2024 in 2nd phase of Odisha Assembly Election & 5th phase of Indian General Election. Counting of votes was on 4 June 2024. In 2019 election, Biju Janata Dal candidate Chakramani Kanhar defeated Indian National Congress candidate Upendra pradhan by a margin of 1,671 votes.

2024 Odisha Vidhan Sabha Election, Baliguda
Party	Candidate	Votes	%	±%
BJD	Chakramani Kanhar	43,586	35.88	
INC	Upendra Pradhan	41,915	34.51	
BJP	Kalpana Kanhar	31,481	25.92	
NOTA	None of the above	2,606	2.15	
Majority		1,671	1.37	
Turnout		1,21,463	73.39	
BJD hold				

=== 2019 ===
In 2019 election, Biju Janata Dal candidate Chakramani Kanhar defeated Indian National Congress candidate Siman Mallick by a margin of 6,940 votes.

2019 Vidhan Sabha Election, Baliguda
Party	Candidate	Votes	%	±%
BJD	Chakramani Kanhar	43,175	39.23	
INC	Siman Mallick	36,265	32.95	
BJP	Karendra Majhi	25,217	22.91	
NOTA	None of the above	1,486	1.35	
Majority		6,940	6.28	
Turnout		1,10,070	70.64	
BJD hold				

=== 2014 ===
In 2014 election, Biju Janata Dal candidate Rajib Patra defeated Indian National Congress candidate Klesa Pradhan by a margin of 2,696 votes.

2014 Vidhan Sabha Election, Baliguda
Party	Candidate	Votes	%	±%
BJD	Rajib Patra	37,606	37.25	▲15.77
INC	Klesa Pradhan	34,910	34.58	▲5.56
BJP	Karendra Majhi	18,103	17.93	▼15.18
NOTA	None of the above	1,856	1.84	−
Majority		2,696	2.67	▼1.42
Turnout		1,00,944	73.59	▲7.0
Registered electors		1,37,163		
BJD gain from BJP				

=== 2009 ===
In 2009 election, Bharatiya Janata Party candidate Karendra Majhi defeated Indian National Congress candidate Sadananda Mallik by a margin of 11,193 votes.

2009 Vidhan Sabha Election, Baliguda
Party	Candidate	Votes	%	±%
BJP	Karendra Majhi	26,180	33.11	−
INC	Sadananda Mallick	22,943	29.02	−
BJD	Dinesh Singh Pradhan	16,980	21.48	−
Majority		3,237	4.09 (Note: %of total valid votes)	−
Turnout		79,079	66.59	−
BJP hold				
