= Boudh Assembly constituency =

Constituency of the Odisha legislative assembly in India

Coordinates: 20.84°N 84.32°E

Boudh
- Constituency No. 86 for the Odisha Legislative Assembly

Constituency details
- Country: India
- Region: East India
- State: Odisha
- Division: Southern Division
- District: Boudh
- Lok Sabha constituency: Kandhamal
- Established: 1951
- Total electors: 1,66,544 (Note: as on 2024) (Note: as data published by election commission)
- Reservation: None

Member of Legislative Assembly
- 17th Odisha Legislative Assembly
- Incumbent Saroj Kumar Pradhan
- Party: Bharatiya Janata Party
- Elected year: 2024

Boudh is a Vidhan Sabha constituency of Boudh district, Odisha.

Area of this constituency includes Boudh, 11 GPs (Telibandha, Khuntabandha, Mursundhi, Badhigam, Mundapada, Baghiapada, Brahmanipali, Ambajhari, Tikarapada, Padmanapur and Laxmiprasad) of Boudh block and Harbhanga block.

== Elected members ==
Vote share of winning candidates
| 2024 | 46.36% |
| 2019 | 49.83% |
| 2014 | 48.61% |
| 2009 | 50.60% |
| 2004 | 38.73% |
| 2000 | 33.91% |
| 1995 | 40.40% |
| 1990 | 51.01% |
| 1985 | 42.31% |
| 1980 | 58.35% |
| 1977 | 60.85% |

Since its formation in 1951, 16 elections were held till date.

List of members elected from Boudh constituency are:

| Year | Member | Party |
|---|---|---|
| 2024 | Saroj Kumar Pradhan | Bharatiya Janata Party |
| 2019 | Pradip Kumar Amat | Biju Janata Dal |
| 2014 | Pradip Kumar Amat | Biju Janata Dal |
| 2009 | Pradip Kumar Amat | Biju Janata Dal |
| 2004 | Pradip Kumar Amat | Biju Janata Dal |
| 2000 | Pradip Kumar Amat | Biju Janata Dal |
| 1995 | Satchidananda Dalal | Janata Dal |
| 1990 | Satchidananda Dalal | Janata Dal |
| 1985 | Sujit Kumar Padhi | Indian National Congress |
| 1980 | Himansu Sekhar Padhi | Indian National Congress (I) |
| 1977 | Natabara Pradhan | Janata Party |
| 1974 | Natabara Pradhan | Swatantra Party |
| 1971 | Natabara Pradhan | Swatantra Party |
| 1967 | Himansu Sekhar Padhi | Orissa Jana Congress |
| 1961 | Anirudha Dipa | Swatantra Party |
1956-1960: Constituency did not exist
| 1951 | Himansu Sekhar Padhi | Independent politician |

== Election results ==
=== 2024 ===
Voting were held on 20 May 2024 in 2nd phase of Odisha Assembly Election & 5th phase of Indian General Election. Counting of votes was on 4 June 2024. In 2024 election, Bharatiya Janata Party candidate Saroj Kumar Pradhan defeated Biju Janata Dal candidate Pradip Kumar Amat by a margin of 2,765 votes.

2024 Odisha Vidhan Sabha Election, Boudh
| Party | Candidate | Votes | % | ±% |
|---|---|---|---|---|
| BJP | Saroj Kumar Pradhan | 62,494 | 46.36 | |
| BJD | Pradip Kumar Amat | 59,729 | 44.31 | |
| INC | Naba Kumar Mishra | 9,468 | 7.02 | |
| NOTA | None of the above | 1,181 | 0.88 | |
| Majority | | 2,765 | 2.05 | |
| Turnout | | 1,34,799 | 80.94 | |
| BJP gain from BJD | | | | |

=== 2019 ===
In 2019 election, Biju Janata Dal candidate Pradip Kumar Amat defeated Bharatiya Janata Party candidate Susanta Kumar Pradhan by a margin of 10,448 votes.

2019 Vidhan Sabha Election, Boudh
| Party | Candidate | Votes | % | ±% |
|---|---|---|---|---|
| BJD | Pradip Kumar Amat | 61,536 | 49.83 | |
| BJP | Susanta Kumar Pradhan | 51,088 | 41.37 | |
| CPI | Abakash Sahoo | 7,119 | 5.76 | |
| NOTA | None of the above | 908 | 0.74 | |
| Majority | | 10,448 | 8.46 | |
| Turnout | | 1,23,498 | 77.3 | |
| BJD hold | | | | |

=== 2014 ===
In 2014 election, Biju Janata Dal candidate Pradip Kumar Amat defeated Indian National Congress candidate Susanta Kumar Pradhan by a margin of 11,148 votes.

2014 Vidhan Sabha Election, Boudh
| Party | Candidate | Votes | % | ±% |
|---|---|---|---|---|
| BJD | Pradip Kumar Amat | 54,618 | 48.61 | ▼1.99 |
| INC | Susanta Kumar Pradhan | 43,470 | 38.69 | ▲22.42 |
| BJP | Surya Narayan Mahapatra | 8,597 | 7.65 | ▲2.87 |
| NOTA | None of the above | 946 | 0.84 | |
| Majority | | 11,148 | 9.92 | |
| Turnout | | 1,12,349 | 80.53 | ▲7.34 |
| Registered electors | | 1,39,518 | | |
| BJD hold | | | | |

=== 2009 ===
In 2009 election, Biju Janata Dal candidate Pradip Kumar Amat defeated Independent candidate Susanta Kumar Pradhan by a margin of 28,207 votes.

2009 Vidhan Sabha Election, Boudh
| Party | Candidate | Votes | % | ±% |
|---|---|---|---|---|
| BJD | Pradip Kumar Amat | 49,439 | 50.60 | − |
| Independent | Susanta Kumar Pradhan | 21,232 | 21.73 | − |
| INC | Narendra Kumar Panigrahi | 15,895 | 16.27 | − |
| BJP | Santanu Kumar Pradhan | 4,666 | 4.78 | − |
| Majority | | 28,207 | 28.87 (Note: %of total valid votes) | − |
| Turnout | | 97,768 | 73.19 | − |
| BJD hold | | | | |
