= Chari Sambhu Temple =

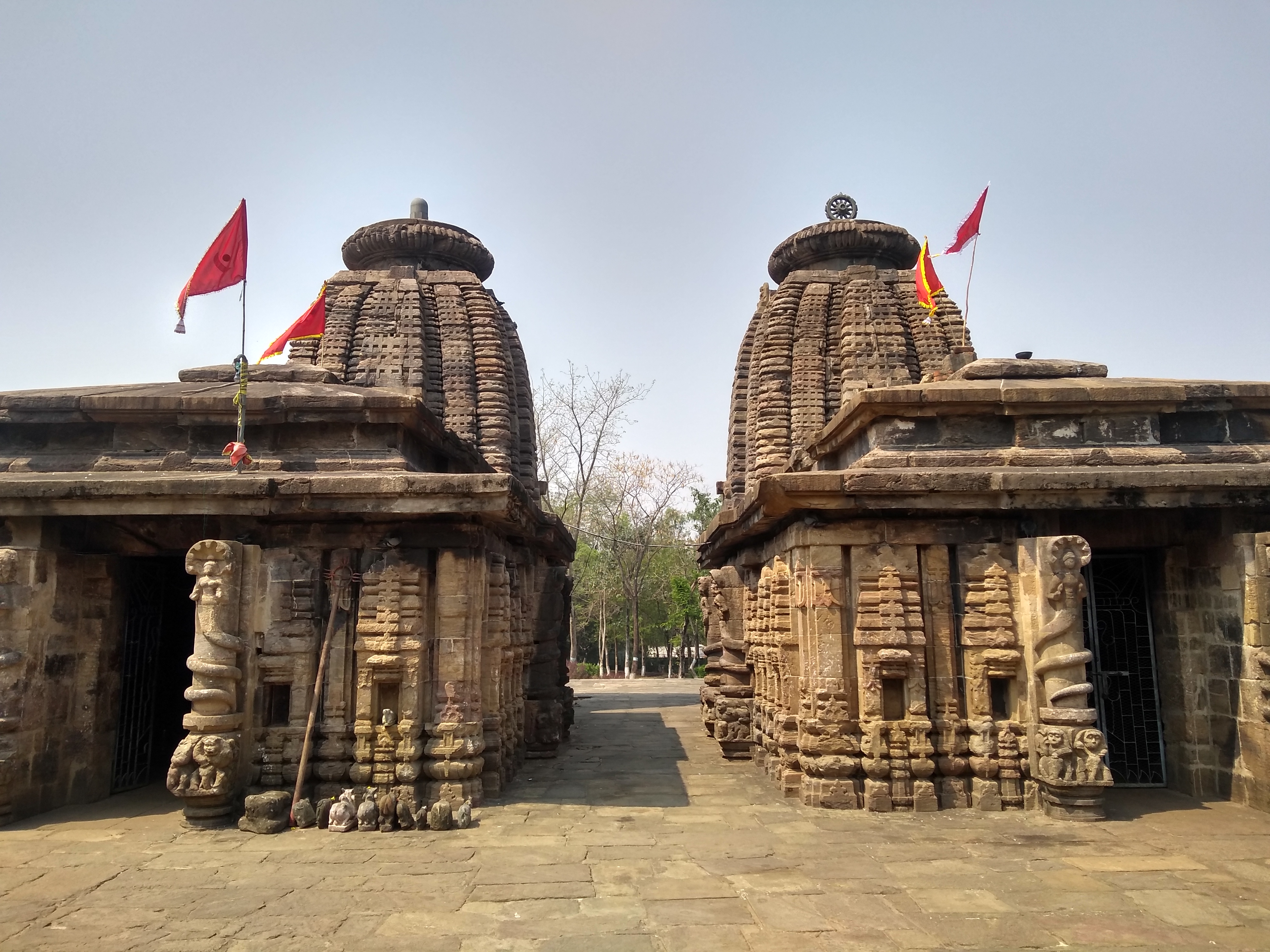
- Image of the temple complex.

Religion
- Affiliation: Hinduism Kalinga architecture
- District: Boudh district
- Governing body: ASI

Location
- Location: Boudh (Odisha)
- State: Odisha
- Country: India
- Interactive map of Chari Sambhu Temple
- Coordinates: 20.874982°N 84.205380°E
- Temple: 2

Website
- Official website

Chari Sambhu Temple or Gandharadi Temple is located at the bank of river Mahanadi at Gandharadi village (Janhapank area) of Boudh district of Odisha, India. It is famous for twin temples of Nilamadhava and Sidheswar. These temples display high quality architectural work. These temples were developed under the support of the Bhanja leaders of Khinjali mandala in ninth century AD. These temple attracts visitors throughout the year. The temple has been considered a religious site during the Baudh State.

== Location ==
The temple is located at the bank of river Mahanadi at Gandharadi village (Janhapank area) of Boudh district at 20.874982°N 84.205380°E.

== Governance ==
This temple is undertaken by ASI (Archeological Survey of India). Also ASI says that the temples were made in 8th century at the ruling period of King Gandhamardana Dev. The temples are made of Black Pagoda and Black Granite.

== See also ==
- Boudh district
- Hindu temple architecture
