= Phulbani Assembly constituency =

Constituency of the Odisha legislative assembly in India

Coordinates: 20.48°N 84.23°E

Phulbani
- Constituency No. 84 for the Odisha Legislative Assembly

Constituency details
- Country: India
- Region: East India
- State: Odisha
- Division: Southern Division
- District: Kandhamal
- Lok Sabha constituency: Kandhamal
- Established: 1951
- Total electors: 2,00,205 (Note: as on 2024) (Note: as data published by election commission)
- Reservation: ST

Member of Legislative Assembly
- 17th Odisha Legislative Assembly
- Incumbent Uma Charan Mallick
- Party: Bharatiya Janata Party
- Elected year: 2024

Phulbani is a Vidhan Sabha constituency of Kandhamal district, Odisha, India.

This constituency includes Phulbani, Phulbani block, Chakapada block, Khajuripada block and Phiringia block.

== Elected members ==
Vote share of winning candidates
2024	36.81%
2019	48.05%
2014	46.65%
2009	36.60%
2004	50.55%
2000	50.25%
1995	36.59%
1990	64.00%
1985	46.64%
1980	60.24%
1977	57.12%

Since its formation in 1951, 18 elections were held till date including in one bypoll in 1955. It was a 2 member constituency for 1952 & 1957.

List of members elected from Phulbani constituency are:

Year	Member	Party
2024	Uma Charan Mallick	Bharatiya Janata Party
2019	Angada Kanhar	Biju Janata Dal
2014	Duguni Kanhar	Biju Janata Dal
2009	Debendra Kanhar	Biju Janata Dal
2004	Padmanabha Behara	Biju Janata Dal
2000	Bishnu Priya Behera	Biju Janata Dal
1995	Dasarathi Behera	Independent politician
1990	Padmanabha Behara	Janata Dal
1985	Abhimanyu Behera	Indian National Congress
1980	Chandra Sekhar Behera	Indian National Congress (I)
1977	Prahallad Behera	Janata Party
1974	Chandra Sekhar Behera	Indian National Congress
1971	Jagadish Jani	Indian National Congress (R)
1967	Barada Prasanna Kanhar	Swatantra Party
1961	Himansu Sekhar Padhi	Orissa Jana Congress
1957 (Note: It was a 2 member constituency)	Anirudha Dipa	Ganatantra Parishad
1957	Himansu Sekhar Padhi	Ganatantra Parishad
1955 (bypoll) (Note: Death of Balakrishna Mallick)	Sarangdhar Pradhan	Ganatantra Parishad
1951 (Note: It was a 2 member constituency)	Balakrishna Mallick	Independent politician
1951	Sadananda Sahu	Independent politician

== Election results ==
=== 2024 ===
Voting were held on 20 May 2024 in 2nd phase of Odisha Assembly Election & 5th phase of Indian General Election. Counting of votes was on 4 June 2024. In 2024 election, Bharatiya Janata Party candidate Uma Charan Mallick defeated Biju Janata Dal candidate Jayashree Kanhar by a margin of 2,858 votes.

2024 Odisha Vidhan Sabha Election, Phulbani
Party	Candidate	Votes	%	±%
BJP	Uma Charan Mallick	53,900	36.81	
BJD	Jayashree Kanhar	51,042	34.85	
INC	Prativa Kanhar	23,328	15.93	
NOTA	None of the above	1,894	1.29	
Majority		2,858	1.96	
Turnout		1,46,447	73.15	
BJP gain from BJD				

=== 2019 ===
In 2019 election, Biju Janata Dal candidate Angada Kanhar defeated Bharatiya Janata Party candidate Debanarayan Pradhan by a margin of 24,416 votes.

2019 Vidhan Sabha Election, Phulbani
Party	Candidate	Votes	%	±%
BJD	Angada Kanhar	65,564	48.05	
BJP	Debanarayan Pradhan	41,148	30.15	
INC	Kishor Chandra Kanhar	23,317	17.09	
NOTA	None of the above	1,250	0.92	
Majority		24,416	17.09	
Turnout		1,36,462	72.36	
BJD hold				

=== 2014 ===
In 2014 election, Biju Janata Dal candidate Duguni Kanhar defeated Bharatiya Janata Party candidate Debanarayan Pradhan by a margin of 25,795 votes.

2014 Vidhan Sabha Election, Phulbani
Party	Candidate	Votes	%	±%
BJD	Duguni Kanhar	58,273	46.65	▲10.05
BJP	Debanarayan Pradhan	32,478	26.00	▼2.21
INC	Sudarsan Kanhar	21,510	17.22	▼5.52
NOTA	None of the above	1,584	1.27	−
Majority		25,795	20.64	
Turnout		1,24,922	75.64	▲10.42
Registered electors		1,65,147		
BJD hold				

=== 2009 ===
In 2009 election, Biju Janata Dal candidate Debendra Kanhar defeated Bharatiya Janata Party candidate Debanarayan Pradhan by a margin of 8,729 votes.

2009 Vidhan Sabha Election: Phulbani
Party		Votes	%	±%
BJD	Abinash pradhan	38,092	36.60	−
BJP	Debanarayan Pradhan	29,363	28.21	−
INC	Jalandhar Kanhar	23,669	22.74	−
JMM	Artratrana Kanhar	5,816	5.59	−
Majority		8,729	8.39 (Note: % of total valid votes)	−
Turnout		1,04,078	65.22	−
BJD hold				
