= Pradip Kumar Amat =

Indian politician

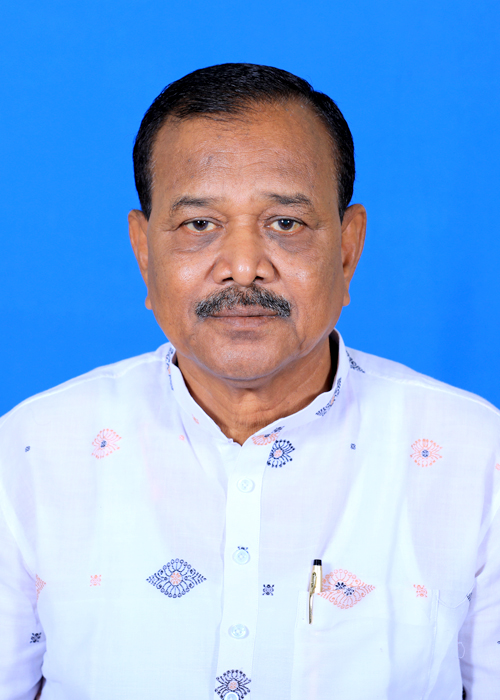

Cabinet Minister Government of Odisha
- In office 5 June 2022 – 11 June 2024
- Chief Minister: Naveen Patnaik
- Ministry and Departments: Forest & Environment and Climate Change; Panchayati Raj & Drinking Water; Information & Public Relations

Member of Odisha Legislative Assembly
- In office 5 March 2000 – 4 Jun 2024
- Preceded by: Satchidananda Dalal
- Succeeded by: Saroj Kumar Pradhan
- Constituency: Boudh

Speaker of Odisha Legislative Assembly
- In office 16 May 2017 – 31 May 2019
- Preceded by: Niranjan Pujari
- Succeeded by: Surjya Narayan Patro
- In office 25 May 2009 – 20 May 2014
- Preceded by: Kishore Kumar Mohanty
- Succeeded by: Niranjan Pujari

Personal details
- Born: 18 October 1952 (age 74) Boudh, Odisha, India
- Party: Biju Janta Dal

Pradip Kumar Amat is an Indian politician from Odisha. He was a Member of the Legislative Assembly from 2000, representing the Boudh Assembly constituency as both a former Cabinet Minister of the Government of Odisha and a member of the Biju Janata Dale. He was also a finance minister of Odisha when presenting the 2015 Budget of Odisha.

He studied LLB, M.A. and was an advocate by profession.

He was elected as MLA from Boudh at the Odisha Assembly during 2000–2004, 2004–2009, 2009–2014 and 2014–2019, and from 2019 (incumbent). He was inducted into Naveen Patnaik's Cabinet as Forest & Environment, Panchayati Raj & Drinking Water, and Information & Public Relations Minister in June 2022.
