= Achyuta Samanta =

Indian educationist and politician

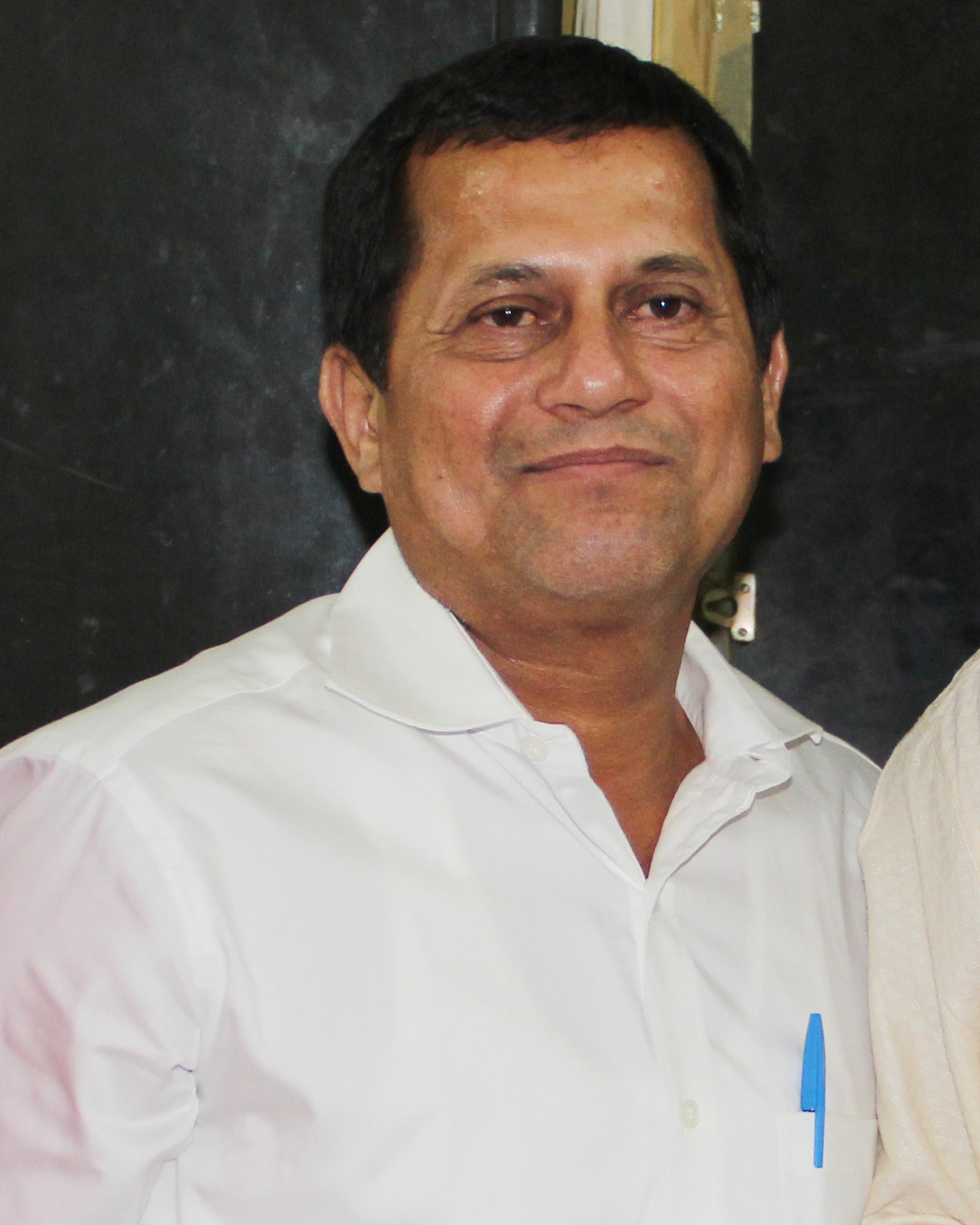

Member of Parliament, Lok Sabha
- In office 25 May 2019 – 4 June 2024
- Preceded by: Pratyusha Rajeshwari Singh
- Succeeded by: Sukanta Kumar Panigrahi
- Constituency: Kandhamal

Personal details
- Born: 20 January 1965 (age 61) Kalarabanka, Jagatsinghpur, Odisha, India
- Party: Biju Janata Dal
- Education: Utkal University
- Occupation: Social worker and entrepreneur
- Known for: Founder of KIIT Group of Institutions
- Website: www.achyutasamanta.com

Achyuta Samanta (born 20 January 1965) is an Indian educationist, social worker, and politician, known for founding the Kalinga Institute of Industrial Technology (KIIT) and the Kalinga Institute of Social Sciences (KISS) in Bhubaneswar, Odisha. He served as a member of parliament in the Lok Sabha, representing the Kandhamal constituency of Odisha from 2019 to 2024.

== Early life and education ==
Samanta was born in Kalarabanka village in Cuttack district of Odisha, India. He lost his father at the age of four and was raised in poverty by his mother, along with six siblings. He completed a master's degree in chemistry from Utkal University.

== Career and institutions founded ==
In 1992, Samanta established KIIT with limited resources, which grew into a private university offering multidisciplinary programs. In 1993, he founded KISS, a fully residential institution providing free education, food, and healthcare to tribal students.

In 2013, Samanta launched the "Art of Giving" initiative, focused on promoting kindness, sharing, and community service.

== Political career ==
In 2019, Samanta was elected to the Lok Sabha from Kandhamal as a candidate of the Biju Janata Dal (BJD). His tenure focused on education, tribal development, and rural welfare. In 2024, he stepped away from active politics.

== Awards and recognition ==
Samanta has received several national and international awards, including honorary doctorates. Notable recognitions include:

- Mahatma Award for Social Good (2024), awarded by the Aditya Birla Group.
- Gurudev Kalicharan Brahma Award (2025), for contributions to tribal education.
- ISA Award for Service to Humanity (2015), conferred by the Kingdom of Bahrain.
- Gusi Peace Prize (2014), for initiatives in education and social reform.
- FIVB Grand Cross Award (2024), from the International Volleyball Federation.
- Iconic Healthcare Leader Award (2024), from the Association of Healthcare Providers India.
