= Economy of Odisha =

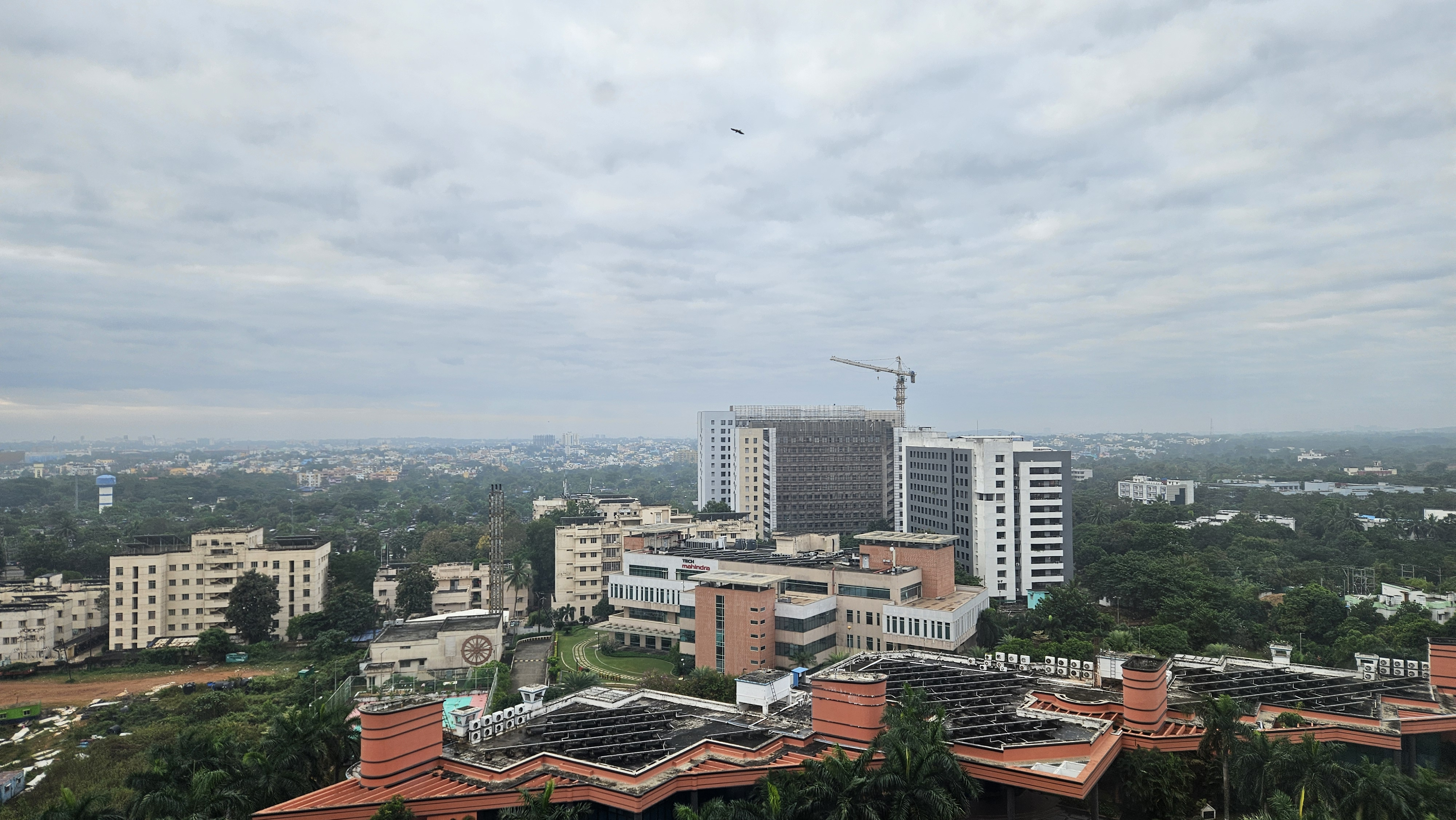
- Bhubaneswar, the capital city of Odisha.

Statistics
- Population: 47,000,000 (2025)
- GDP: ▲₹11.07 trillion (US$110 billion)(nominal; 2026-27) ▲$530.2 billion (PPP; 2026 est.)
- GDP rank: 16th (2026-27)
- GDP growth: 12 % (2025-26 est.) (current prices)
- GDP per capita: ▲₹210,186 (US$2,200) (2025-26 est.)
- GDP per capita rank: 21st (2023–24)
- GDP by sector: Agriculture & Mining 21% Industry 43% Services 36% (2023–24)
- Inflation (CPI): ▲7.1%
- Population below national poverty line: ▼11.07% 18th in poverty (2022–23)
- Gini coefficient: 0.31 (2009–10)
- Unemployment: ▼1.7% (Nov 2020)

Public finance
- Government debt: 12.7% of GSDP (2025-26 BE)
- Budget balance: ▲₹34,203 crore (US$3.6 billion) (3.2% of GSDP) (2025-26 est.)
- Revenue: ▲₹2.32 lakh crore (US$24 billion) (2025-26 est.)
- Spending: ▲₹2.66 lakh crore (US$28 billion) (2025-26 est.)
- All values, unless otherwise stated, are in US dollars.

The economy of Odisha is one of the fastest growing economies in India. According to 2023–24 economic survey, Odisha's gross state domestic product (GSDP) was expected to grow at 10.57%. Odisha's economy is now an industrial and service-based economy, with 79% contribution all-together to state GSDP while primary sector contribution (agriculture and mining) to state GSDP is about 21%.

According to recent estimates, the size of Odisha's economy has increased by 54.93% during the last five years in terms of the gross state domestic product (GSDP). Thereby, Odisha achieved an annual average growth rate of 5.3% during that period. Odisha is also one of the top FDI destinations in India. In the fiscal year 2011–12, Odisha received investment proposals worth ₹49,527 crore (US$9.296 billion). According to the Reserve Bank of India, It received ₹53,000 crore (US$8.33 billion) worth of new FDI commitments in the 2012–13 fiscal year.

== Overview ==
In 2013–14, the GSDP growth rate dropped to 2.21%. This slowdown was attributed to the Phailin cyclone, which caused a negative growth of 9.78% in the agricultural sector and also affected several other sectors. According to the 2011 Census of India, Odisha has a working population of 17,541,589, among them 61% are main workers and rest are marginal workers. 33.9% of the total working female population are main workers. As of June 2014, Odisha has 10,95,151 people registered in various employment exchanges of the state. Of them, 10,42,826 reported themselves educated. Odisha had a rural unemployment rate of 8.7% and an urban unemployment rate 5.8% calculated based on the current daily status basis in the 68th National Sample Survey (2011–2012). The per capita income of the state was ₹98,983 (US$1,531) in 2013–14. The state has a public debt of ₹38,666 crore (US$6.34 billion), which is ₹8,909 per capita (US$146), at the end of 2013–14.

According to ASSOCHAM, in the fiscal year 2011–12, Odisha received investment proposals worth ₹49,527 crore (US$9.296 billion). According to the Reserve Bank of India, Odisha received new FDI proposals worth Rs 53,000 crore (US$8.333 billion) in the 2012–13 fiscal year. In 2012–13, ₹125 crore (US$19.66 million) worth of foreign aid was received by NGOs in the state.

Contribution of each sector to the GSDP (in percent)
1. Agriculture (21.0%)
2. Industry (43.0%)
3. Service (36.0%)

GSDP by year
Year	GSDP (in crore Indian rupees)
2001–02	46,756
2002–03	49,719
2003–04	61,008
2004–05	77,729
2005–06	85,096
2006–07	101,839
2007–08	129,274
2008–09	148,491
2009–10	162,946
2010–11	197,530
2011–12	214,583
2012–13	255,459
2013–14	288,414
2014–15	310,810
2015–16	348,107
2019–20	521,275
2021–22	661,428
2022–23	765,962
2023–24	861,507
2024-25	949,140
2025-26	1,063,000

== Economy ==
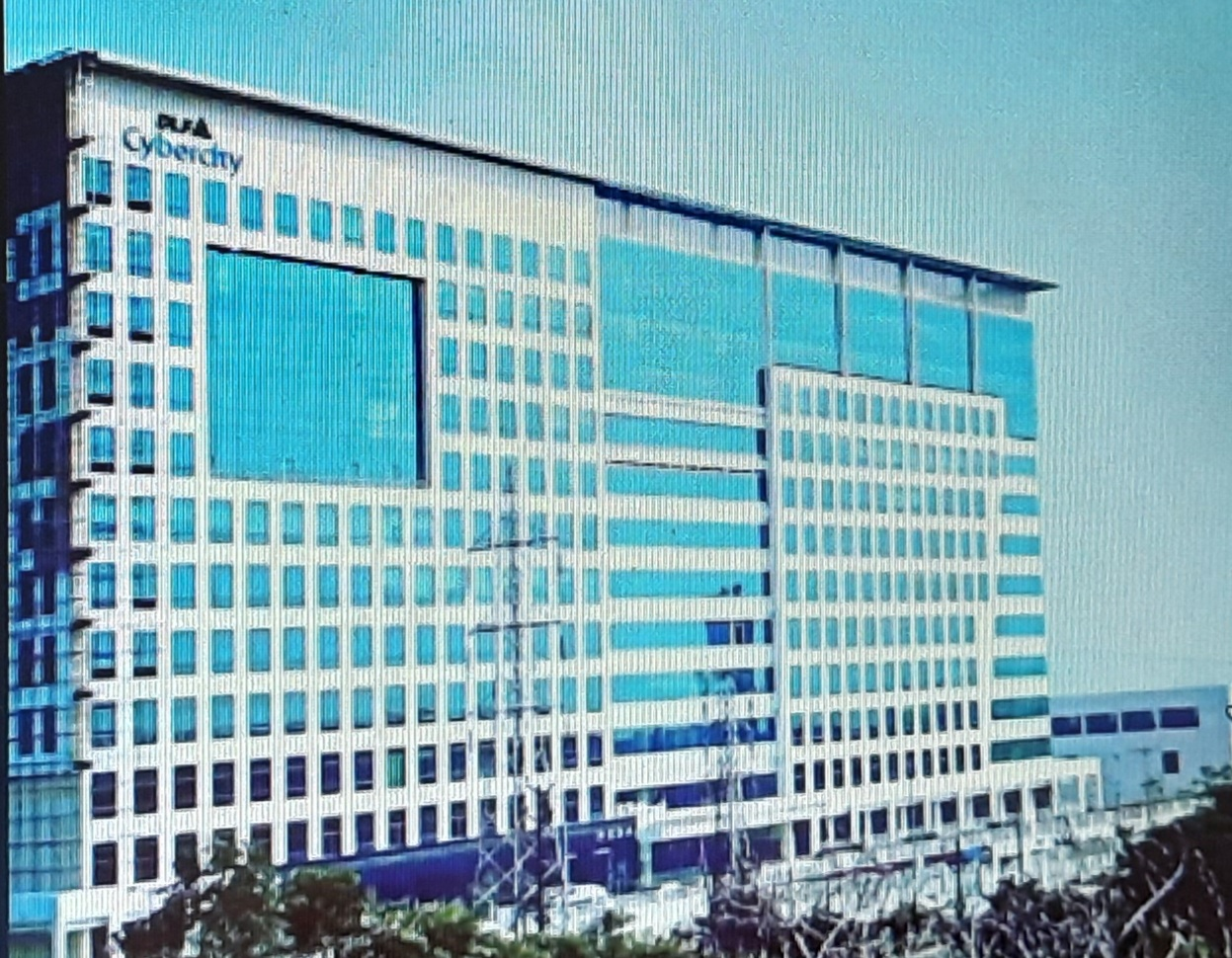
DLF Cyber City Bhubaneswar

Bhubaneswar is an administrative, information technology, education and tourism city. Bhubaneswar was ranked as the best place to do business in India by the World Bank in 2014. Bhubaneswar has emerged as one of the fast-growing, important trading and commercial hub in the state and eastern India. Tourism is a major industry, attracting about 1.5 million tourists in 2011. Bhubaneswar was designed to be a largely residential city with outlying industrial areas. The economy had few major players until the 1990s and was dominated by retail and small-scale manufacturing. With the economic liberalisation policy adopted by the Government of India in the 1990s, Bhubaneswar received investment in telecommunications, information technology (IT) and higher education.

In 2011, according to a study by Associated Chambers of Commerce and Industry of India, Bhubaneswar had the highest rate of employment growth among 17 Tier-2 cities in India. It has been listed among the top ten emerging cities in India by Cushman and Wakefield, taking into consideration factors like demographics, physical, social and real estate infrastructure, current level and scope of economic activities and government support. In 2012, Bhubaneswar was ranked third among Indian cities, in starting and operating a business by the World Bank. Bhubaneswar has been traditionally home to handicrafts industry, including silver filigree work, appliqué work, stone and wood carvings and patta painting, which significantly contributes to the city's economy. The late 2000s saw a surge of investments in the real estate, infrastructure, retail and hospitality sectors; several shopping malls and organised retails opened outlets in Bhubaneswar. In the informal sector, 22,000 vendors operate in regulated or unregulated vending zones.

As of 2001, around 2.15% of the city's workforce was employed in the primary sector (agriculture, forestry, mining, etc.); 2.18% worked in the secondary sector (industrial and manufacturing); and 95.67% worked in the tertiary sector (service industries).

The Department of Industries established four industrial areas in and around Bhubaneswar, in the Rasulgarh, Mancheswar, Chandaka, and Bhagabanpur areas. Industrial sector in Bhubaneswar includes paper, steel, automobile, food, pharma and electronics industries. A large number of companies including Odisha State Cooperative Milk Producers' Federation, Bharat Biotech, Topaz Solar, Britannia Industries, SMS Group and Jockey International have there manufacturing plant.

In 2009, Odisha was ranked ninth among Indian states in terms of software export by NASSCOM, with most IT/ITES companies established in Bhubaneswar. In 2011–12, Odisha had a growth rate of 17% for software exports. According to a 2012 survey, among the tier-2 cities in India, Bhubaneswar has been chosen as the best for conducting IT/ITES business. The government fostered growth by developing of IT parks such as Infocity-1, Infovalley, STPI-Bhubaneswar and JSS STP. Infocity was conceived as a five-star park, under the Export Promotion Industrial Parks (EPIP) Scheme to create infrastructure facilities for setting up information technology related industries. Infosys and Tech Mahindra have been present in Bhubaneswar since 1996. Other Multinational Companies include Accenture, Cognizant, Tata Consultancy Services, Wipro, IBM, Genpact, Firstsource, Mindtree, MphasiS, Ericsson, Semtech, Reliance Communications, PricewaterhouseCoopers, Bharti Airtel, DLF (company), Capgemini, Happiest Minds, Concentrix, RiR Electronics, Synopsis, EY and Deloitte. It also houses the headquarters of POSCO India, a subsidiary of South Korean conglomerate POSCO and Govt. of India owned National Aluminium Company(NALCO). Apart from the big multinationals, some 300 small and mid-size IT companies and business startups have offices in Bhubaneswar.

Lulu International Shopping Malls Private Limited plans to set up shopping malls, hypermarkets, agri sourcing and logistics hub with an investment of Rs 1,500 crore.

Cuttack is widely known as commercial capital of odisha famous for its unique silver filigree works which had been practiced by local artisans from 1000 of years. There are 11 large-scale industries in and around Cuttack, mostly in Choudwar and Athagarh, and many more in the pipeline. These industries include steel, power, automobiles, alloys, and fireclay. Indian Metals & Ferro Alloys (IMFA), the country's largest producer of ferrous alloys, is in Choudwar, Cuttack. A mega-auto complex is in implementation stages on the city's outskirts. Cuttack occupies a very significant place in the logistics map of the country. The number of medium- and small-scale industries concentrated around Cuttack is by far the largest among the cities in the state. The industrial estates in and around Cuttack number around eight. Jagatpur and Khapuria are industrial estates inside the city. A large chunk of these serve as ancillary industries for the big industrial houses in Odisha and other states.

== Sectors ==
=== Agriculture and Livestock ===
According to the 2011 Census of India, 61.8% of the working population are engaged in agricultural activities. However, the agricultural activities undertaken in the state contributed only 16.3% to the GSDP in the fiscal year 2013–14 and it was estimated to be 15.4% in 2014–15. The area under cultivation was 5,691 hectares in 2005–06 and it dropped to 5,424 hectares in 2013–14. Rice is the dominant crop in Odisha. It is grown on 77% of the area under cultivation. Odisha produced 8,360 metric tonnes of rice in 2013–14, a drop from 10,210 metric tonnes due to the cyclone Phailin. Given below is a table of 2015 national output share of select agricultural crops and allied segments in Odisha based on 2011 prices.

Segment	National Share %
Cow pea	45.0
Pumpkin	33.6
Niger seed	30.5
Sweet potato	30.4
Turmeric	17.0
San hemp	24.7
Brinjal	14.3
Water melon	12.1
Lemon	11.7
Bitter gourd	11.1
Coconut	11.0
Betel	9.9
Cabbage	8.5
Ber	8.4
Fuel wood	8.4
Linseed	7.8
Cashew nut	7.3
Parmal	7.2
Jackfruit	6.9
Okra	6.8
Sunflower	6.3
Bottle gourd	6.0
Tomato	5.9
Moong	5.8
Paddy	5.6
Arhar	5.5
Mango	5.0
Chilli	5.0

During 2013–14, the state exported 4.13 lakh tonnes and ₹1,800 crore worth of seafood. In 2014–15, the value of exports rose by 26% to ₹2,300 crore with 4.67 tonnes being exported. Odisha is the fourth largest shrimp producing state in India. On 22 November 2017, Odisha government decided to launch "Nabakrushna Choudhury Seccha Unnayan Yojana" to provide irrigation facility to about 55,000 hectare of agricultural land across Odisha. The scheme would be implemented with an outlay of Rs 635 crore over a period of three years. Under the scheme, 46,296 hectare command area of 14 major and medium irrigations and 284 minor irrigation projects will be revived.

=== Industry ===
The primary industries in Odisha are manufacturing; mining and quarrying; electricity, gas and water supply and construction. The industrial sector's contribution to the state's GSDP was estimated at 33.45% in 2014–15. Most of Odisha's industries are mineral-based. Odisha has 25% of India's iron reserves. It has 10% of India's production capacity in steel. Odisha is the top aluminium producing state in India. Two of the largest aluminium plants in India are in Odisha, NALCO and Vedanta Resources. Mining contributed an estimated 6.31% to the GSDP.

=== Power ===
Odisha has 9036.36 MW installed capacity of electricity production, out of which 6753.04 MW is coal-generated. 2166.93 MW is generated by hydro power and 116.39 MW by other renewable sources.

Odisha was the first state in India to reform its power sector. In 1996, it passed the Orissa Electricity Reform Act to restructure and privatize the sector. Before the Act, the single public-sector company Orissa State Electricity Board (OSEB) had been producing and supplying electricity in the state since its establishment in 1961. But by 1994–95, OSEB had run into heavy losses and there was a gap of 45% between consumption and production. The reforms unbundled power generation from transmission and distribution. Following the reforms, hydro power plants were handed over to Odisha Hydro Power Corporation (OHPC) and the existing thermal power plants were transferred to Odisha Power Generation Corporation (OPGC). Grid Corporation of Odisha (Gridco) was given the task of power supply. Initially, these were operated as state-owned farms, but later were corporatised.

In August 2014, the government announced a plan to invest ₹54,000 crore in the power sector over the next 5 years, to provide 24-hours electricity to both the urban and rural regions. Odisha expects to reach a power surplus during its peak consumption months by 2015–16.

=== Service ===
The service sector contributed an estimated 51% to the GSDP in 2014–15. The primary sub-sectors are: community, social and personal services, which contributed 13.45% to the GSDP; trade, hotels and restaurants, which contributed 13.09%; financial and insurance services, which contributed 13.64%; and transport, storage and communication, which contributed 10.99%. The state has a well-developed banking network compared to many states of India. There is one bank branch for every 12,000 people. 90% of the branches are in the rural region.

== See also ==
- Industrial Promotion & Investment Corporation of Odisha Limited
- 2015–16 Odisha state budget
