= Sukanta Kumar Panigrahi =

Member of the Lok Sabha

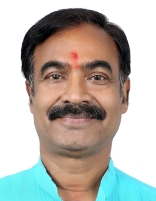
- Official Portrait

Member of Parliament, Lok Sabha
- Incumbent
- Assumed office 4 June 2024
- Preceded by: Achyutananda Samanta
- Constituency: Kandhamal

Personal details
- Party: Bharatiya Janata Party
- Education: MSC in Agriculture

Sukanta Kumar Panigrahi is an Indian politician from Daspalla, Odisha. He was elected as a Member of Parliament from Kandhamal Lok Sabha constituency. He belongs to Bharatiya Janata Party.
