= Biju Krushak Kalyan Yojana =

Farmer welfare scheme in Odisha, India

- Type: Government
- Industry: Agriculture
- Founded: Bhubaneswar, Odisha, India (12 November 2013)
- Headquarters: Bhubaneswar, India
- Area served: Odisha
- Website: bkky.gov.in

The Biju Krushak Kalyan Yojana or BKKY is a health insurance scheme for the farmers in the state of Odisha, India. The Biju Krushak Kalyan Yojana (BKKY) was launched by Chief Minister of Odisha, Sri Naveen Patnaik, in Angul district of Odisha to provide people financial support through health and accident insurance. There are many hospitals, Community Health Centre (CHCs) in each district of Odisha under Biju Krushak Kalya Yojana (BKKY) to provide people health care with low cost.

== Insurance companies selected ==
- IFFCO-TOKIO General Insurance
- National Insurance
- Reliance General Insurance
- The New India Insurance
