= Ramesh Chandra Behera =

Indian politician

Member of the Odisha Legislative Assembly
- Incumbent
- Assumed office 4 June 2024
- Preceded by: Ramesh Chandra Behera
- Constituency: Daspalla

Personal details
- Party: Biju Janata Dal
- Profession: Politician

Ramesh Chandra Behera is an Indian politician who was elected to the Odisha Legislative Assembly from Daspalla as a member of the Biju Janata Dal.
