= Pratyusha Rajeshwari Singh =

Indian politician

Member of Parliament
- In office 19 October 2014 – 24 May 2019
- Preceded by: Hemendra Chandra Singh
- Succeeded by: Achyutananda Samanta
- Constituency: Kandhamal

Personal details
- Born: 29 November 1971
- Party: Bharatiya Janata Party
- Spouse: Hemendra Chandra Singh
- Profession: Politician, Social Worker
- Committees: Standing Committee M/O Defense Consultative Committee M/O Environment, Forest and Climate Change Member Coffee Board

Pratyusha Rajeshwari Singh, popularly known as "Rani Maa Nayagarh" is an Indian politician from Odisha.

== Early life ==
Singh is from Nayagarh in Odisha state, India. She married former MP Hemendra Chandra Singh.

== Career ==
Singh is the BJP Odisha State Vice President. She was a Member of Parliament elected for the 16th Lok Sabha by-election representing BJD. She resigned from BJD and joined BJP on 23 March 2019. She lost the Nayagarh Assembly constituency seat in the 2024 Odisha Legislative Assembly election by a narrow margin of 439 votes to five time MLA Arun Kumar Sahoo of BJD.
