= Boudh district =

- District of Odisha
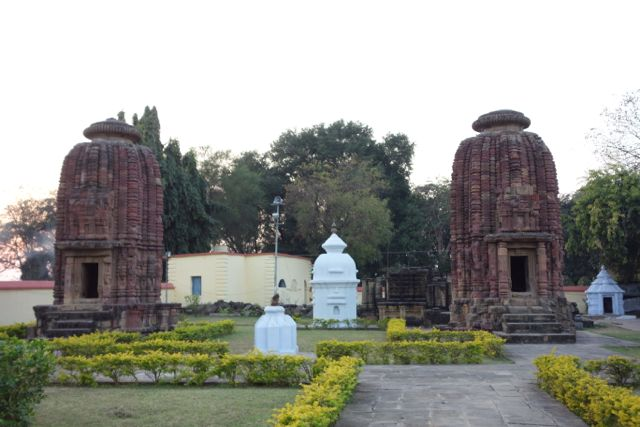
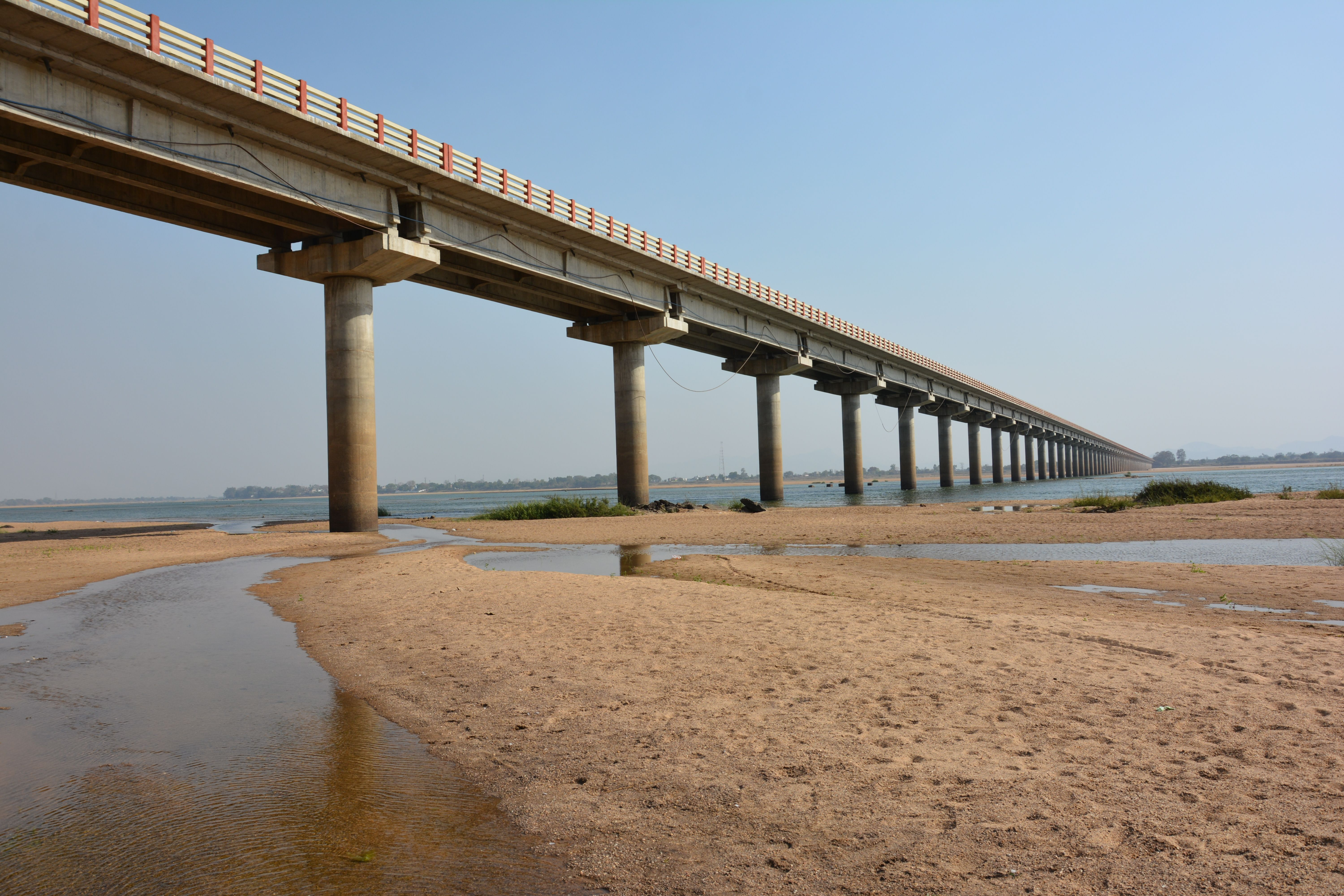
- Top: Ramnath Temple, Boudh; Bottom: Kiakata Bridge over the Mahanadi
- Interactive map of Boudh district
- Coordinates: 20.833°N 84.333°E
- Country: India
- State: Odisha
- Established: 2 January 1994
- Headquarters: Boudh

Government
  - Collector & District Magistrate: Bibhuti Bhusan Nayak
  - Divisional Forest Officer Cum Wildlife Warden: Devapriya kampha, OFS
  - Superintendent of Police: Rajprasad IPS, IPS

Area
  - Total: 3,098 km^{2} (1,196 sq mi)

Population (2011)
  - Total: 441,162
  - Rank: 29
  - Density: 142.4/km^{2} (368.8/sq mi)

Languages
  - Official: Odia, English
- Time zone: UTC+5:30 (IST)
- PIN: 762 0xx
- Vehicle registration: OD-27
- Nearest city: Sambalpur
- Sex ratio: 991 ♂/♀
- Literacy: 72.51%
- Lok Sabha constituency: Kandhamal
- Vidhan Sabha constituency: 2: 082-Kantamal 083-Boudh
- Precipitation: 1,623.1 millimetres (63.90 in)
- Website: boudh.nic.in

Boudh district is an administrative and municipal district, one of thirty in Odisha, India. The district headquarters is located in the city of Boudh.

== History ==
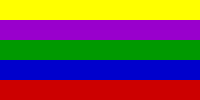
Flag of the Boudh State.

The early history of Boudh is uncertain. The discovery of Buddhist artifacts in Boudh has led historians to believe thatit was an important center of Buddhism. Inscriptions indicate that during the mid-8th century CE, the Boudh region was a part of Khinjali Mandala and it was under the rule of the Bhanja rulers.

The earliest known ruler of the Bhanja dynasty was Nettabhanja, who was an independent ruler of the Dhenkanal region. However, his successors migrated toward the Boudh-Sonepur region and founded Khinjali Mandala. They ruled there as the feudatory of the Bhauma-Karas of Tosali. The name Khinjali Mandala appears for first time in the Sonepur copper plate grant of Satrubhanja Dev. Satrubhanja Dev was the son of Silabhanja Dev, which indicates that Silabhanja Dev founded the Bhanja dynasty at Khinjali Mandala. Dhirtipura was the capital of Khinjali Mandala, which has been identified as present-day Boudh town.

Janmeyjaya I (also known as Mahabhabagupta), the Somavamsi ruler of South Kosala, defeated and killed Ranabhanja Dev, son of Satrubhanja Dev, a ruler from the Bhanja family. The Bhanjas were forced out of the Boudh region, which was then renamed to Odra Desa.

Yayati I, the son of Janmejaya I, succeeded him to the throne and established his capital in Odra-desa at a place called Yayatinagara, which has been identified as the present-day town of Jagati in Boudh District. The Somavansi rulers consequently occupied and migrated toward Utkala, leaving South-Kosala in charge of their representatives. Kosala was eventually lost and occupied by the Chodas and the Kalachuris from the south. The Ganga dynasty fought a protracted war with the Kalachuris for nearly a century to gain control of the Kosala territory. It is inferred from the Chatesvar Inscription (1220 CE) that the war finally ended in favour of the Gangas during the reign of Anangabhima Deva III. Thereafter, Boudh came under the rule of the Ganga dynasty along with Sonepur and it was ruled by the Ganga Administrators.

Over the years, a Brahmin family from among the Ganga administrators became quasi-independent and ruled over this territory. Gandhamardan Dev was the last Brahmin ruler of this family. He lacked any natural born successors, he adopted Ananga Bhanja from Bhanja royal family of Keonjhar State, who then adopted the Dev surname of his adoptive parents. Ananga Bhanja subsequently became the ruler after Gandharmardhan Dev, assuming the name Ananga Dev. This laid the foundation for the Bhanja dynasty in Boudh in the early 14th century CE. This dynasty continued to rule over this area till 1948, when the state acceded to and merged with the Orissa Province after the British withdrawal from India. Their kingdom comprised the modern-day Boudh, Athmallik, and Sonepur areas, with its capital headquarters at Swarnapura (Sonepur). The capital was later moved to Boudh due to the friction with the Chouhan rulers of Patna (Patnagarh in Bolangir District).

Boudh was a very powerful kingdom during the first half of the 17th century CE, with the territory of Sonepur remaining under its direct administration. During this period, the Chouhan rulers of Sambalpur had already established their supremacy over almost entire western Orissa. The Chouhan ruler of Sambalpur, Balabhadradeva (1605-1630 CE), defeated Siddhabhanja Dev (Siddheswar Dev) of Boudh and forced him to relinquish the Sonepur region. They subsequently made it a separate state in 1640 CE.

In the meantime, Orissa was occupied by the Muslims. Details regarding the relationship between the rulers of Boudh and the Muslim subedars in Cuttack is not known. However, Boudh maintained friendly relations with the emperors of India during both Maratha rule and Mughal or other Muslim rulers. Raja Pratap Dev of Boudh rendered assistance to Mughal troops who were passing through Boudh to Puri. Due to this assistance, he was conferred the title "Swasti Sri Derlakhya Dhumbadhipati Jharkhund Mandaleswar". This title continued to be used by the rulers of Boudh till the time of Raja Banamali Deb.

During the region of Sidhabhanja Dev, also known as Siddheswar Dev, the Sonepur region was conquered from Boudh by the Chouhan ruler of Sambalpur. Boudh state had previously lost territory to other kingdoms as well. In 1498-99 CE, the then Raja of Boudh state gifted the territory of Dasapalla to his younger brother, Narayan Dev. Narayan Dev later asserted his independence from Boudh and made Dasapalla a separate state. In 1599-1600 CE, Raja Madan Mohan Dev ceded the territory lying between Amaimuhan and the Kharang river in the west as dowry to his daughters, who married into the Chouhan royal family of Patna State. Athmallik and Khondhmal remained a part of Boudh state for some time.

After the British conquest of Orissa in 1803 CE, Raja Biswambar Dev of Boudh accepted British sovereignty and entered into a treaty agreement with the British East India Company on 3 March 1804.

After the Third Anglo-Maratha War, the British Government permanently occupied Boudh from the Marathas and included this state in the South West Frontier Agency till 1837, when it was brought under the superintendent of Tributary Mahals, Cuttack.

In 1817 CE, Raja Biswambar Dev died and was succeeded by his son Chandra Sekhar Dev. In 1821, Chandra Sekhar Dev received a fresh Sanand from the British Government, fixing the annual tribute at Rs. 800. After his death, his son Pitambara Dev ascended the throne in 1839 CE. During his reign, there was an uprising in the Khondmal region of Ganjam District, led by Chakra Bisoyi. The cause of uprising was the practice of human sacrifice by the Khond tribe of Ganjam District. Pitambara Dev could not quell this uprising, and on 15 February 1855 CE, Khondmal of Ganjam was separated from the Boudh state and annexed to the British territory. Raja Pitambar Dev remained loyal to the British Government and cooperated with the British administration in eradicating human sacrifice and suppressing the Khondh rebellion in Ghumsur and Khondhmal of the then Ganjam District. Chakra Bisoi of Ganjam District, who had stayed in Boudh State since 1855 and organized the Khondhas, was finally driven out of the state, restoring peace and order. The British Government recognized Pitambar Dev's title Raja, by a separate Sanand granted to him in 1875 CE.

The Athmallik state was originally part of Boudh state, with the chief of Boudh serving as the Raja of both Boudh and Athmallik. The chief of Athmallik was called a Zamindar and was addressed as a Samanta. In 1875, the chief of Athmallik was officially recognized as a Raja, and Athamallik became a separate state in 1894 CE.

Raja Jogindra Dev succeeded his father Raja Pitambar Dev after his death in 1879. He was progressive ruler who opened schools and introduced English education in the state. He died in 1913, leaving his minor son Narayan Dev. Hence the Court of Wards and the Dewan took over the running of the affairs of the state. Narayan Dev formally took over after his coronation on 31 March 1925. During Narayan Dev's reign, the power and function of the ruler was considerably reduced and it appears that the state was under the de facto rule of the political agent. Raja Narayan Dev suppressed a political agitation in Boudh in 1930-31 and adopted measures to suppress the Prajamandal Movement in 1945. He also developed the modern-day Jagti village (the historical Yayatinagar, the erstwhile Somavamsi Capital) and renamed it Narayan Nagar. He was the last ruler of the Boudh State and on 1 January 1948, the state merged with the Orissa province.

Both Boudh and Kandhamal were part of Ganjam District for some time. Later, Boudh became a sub-division of the newly created Boudh-Kandhamal District when Kandhamal was separated from Ganjam. On 2 January 1994, Boudh became the district headquarters of a separate district named Boudh, which was carved out of the Boudh-Kandhamal District.

== Geography ==
The district lies in central Odisha towards the south of the Mahanadi River, which forms the western and northern boundary of the district. Across the Mahanadi lay the districts of Bolangir to the west, Subarnapur to the northwest, and Angul to the northeast. Nayagarh District lies to the southeast, Phulbani District to the south, and Kalahandi district to the southwest.

Geographically the Boudh district extends from Latitudes 20°.22’ to 20°.50’N and Longitudes 83°.34’ to 84°.49’E. It is bounded by River Mahanadi and Anugul District to the north, Kandhamal District to the south, Nayagarh District to the east and Tel River and Subarnapur District to the west.

== Transport ==
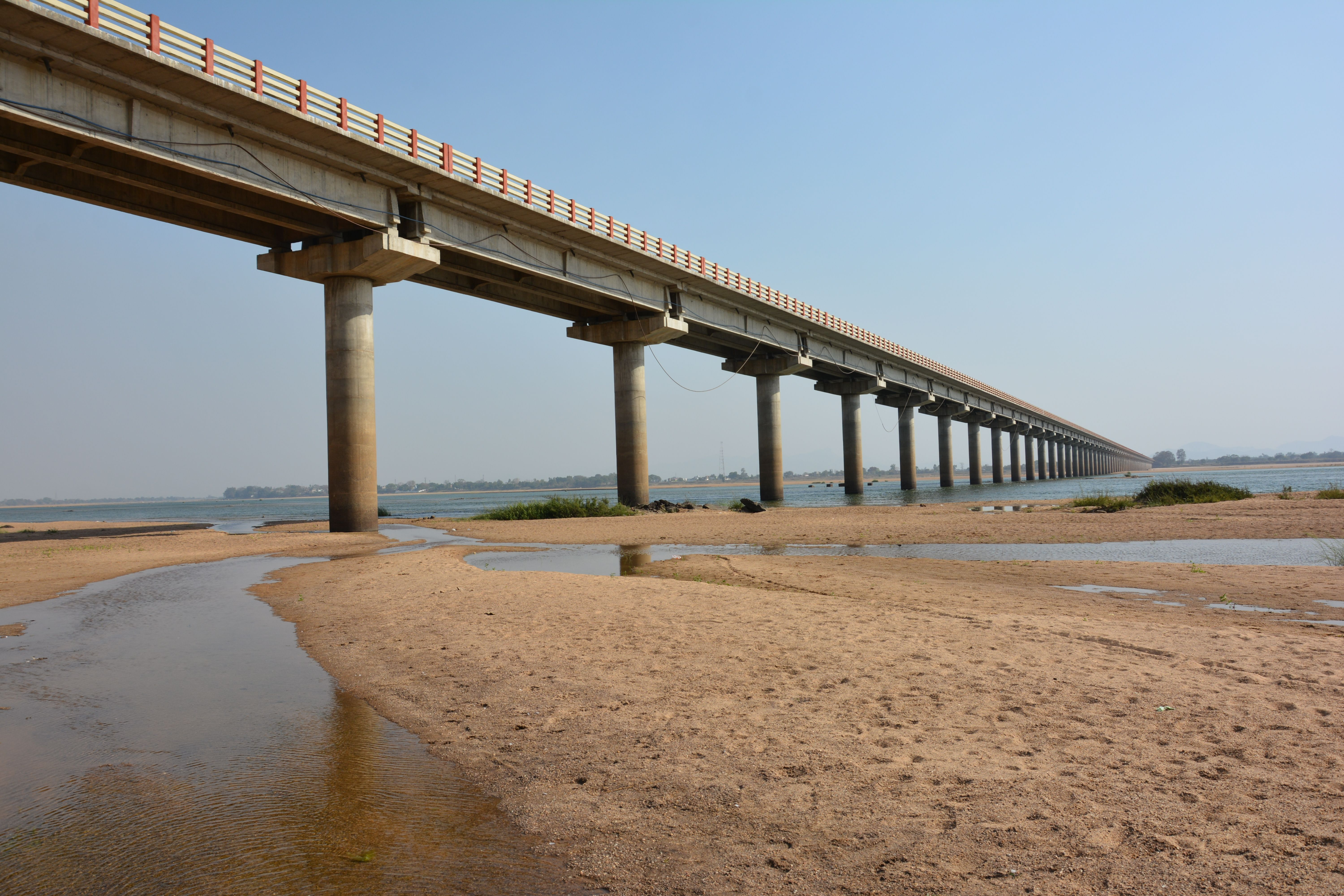
Kiakata Bdrige (Mahanadi River).

Boudh is well connected with road and rail with other district headquarters and the state capital Bhubaneswar. The distance of Boudh from Bhubaneswar is 240 km. One can come to Boudh via State Highway No. 1 and 14 (via Nayagarh–Charichhak) or can come by National Highway No. 42. (via Angul). Regular train services are available from Bhubaneswar viz. Bhubaneswar –Sambalpur Intercity Express, Hirakud Express, Puri-Sambalpur passenger train. To reach Boudh one has to get down at Rairakhol station. From here one has to travel around 27 km. either by bus or taxi to reach Boudh. The nearest airport is at Jharsuguda.

== Demographics ==
Historical population
Year	Pop.	±%
1901	122,615	—
1911	138,767	+13.2%
1921	138,149	−0.4%
1931	151,112	+9.4%
1941	165,204	+9.3%
1951	167,713	+1.5%
1961	190,436	+13.5%
1971	227,902	+19.7%
1981	268,366	+17.8%
1991	317,622	+18.4%
2001	373,372	+17.6%
2011	441,162	+18.2%
Source: Census of India

According to the 2011 census Boudh district has a population of 441,162, roughly equal to the nation of Malta. This gives it a ranking of 552nd in India (out of a total of 640). The district has a population density of 142 inhabitants per square kilometre (370/sq mi). Its population growth rate over the decade 2001-2011 was 17.82%. Baudh has a sex ratio of 991 females for every 1000 males, and a literacy rate of 72.51%. 4.63% of the population lives in urban areas. Scheduled Castes and Scheduled Tribes make up 23.79% and 12.55% of the population respectively.

=== Religion ===
The majority of the people of the district are Hindu (99.32%) and other religions as minority, including Muslim (0.23%), Christians (0.12%), Sikh (0.01%) and others (0.33%). As of 2011 census, the Boudh district has the highest percentage of Hindus in India.

=== Languages ===
Languages of Boudh district (2011)
1. Odia (78.7%)
2. Sambalpuri (20.6%)
3. Other (0.76%)

At the time of the 2011 Census of India, 78.69% of the population in the district spoke Odia and 20.55% Sambalpuri as their first language.

== Culture ==
Boudh is a new district but the civilization of Boudh area is as old as the oldest river valley civilizations of the world. As all civilization started on the banks of the river and the riverine passage was the mode of transport in the days of yore, people of Boudh claimed to be inheritors of rich culture. From 2nd century AD up to a period of one thousand years, Boudh was an important seat of Jagannathism, i.e. Odia Vaishnavism, Shaivism and Shakti cult in the country. Boudh is part of Odia Culture. It was highly developed educationally and culturally during the Soma Vanshi period and also during the Gangas and Surya Vanshi period.

=== Communal dance ===
Various types of dances are prevalent in the district. These are usually held during socio-religious functions. An account of some of the major dances is given below.

- Karma dance
- Danda Nata
- Dalkhai dance

=== Fairs and festivals ===
The Hindus of the district observe a number of festivals all year round. These festivals may broadly be divided into two categories, viz. domestic festivals observed in each household and public festivals and fairs where people congregate in large numbers on some auspicious days. The domestic festivals are confined to worship of family deities, observance of Ekadashi, various vratas, etc. most of them being guided by phases of the moon. The public festivals are usually religious ceremonies attended by a large number of men, women, and children who come for worship as well as entertainment. An account of some of the important festivals in the district is given below.

- Chuda Khai Jatra
- Ratha Jatra
- Laxmi Puja
- Nuakhai
- Sivaratri
- Dasahara
- Dola Jatra
- Puajiuntia and Bhaijiuntia
- Ramaleela
- Kailashi Jatra

=== Recreation ===
Leisure and recreation are essential for life. People usually gather in the evening at the temple or in a common place where the priest or Puran panda recites and explains from the religious texts like the Bhagabat, the Mahabharat, the Ramayan, the Haribansa, or other Puranas. The singing of Bhajan or kirtan accompanied with musical instruments like khanjani, gini, mrudanga or harmonium is also another popular form of entertainment for the people. Occasionally acrobatic feats, monkey dance, beard dance, and snake charming and magic performed by itinerant professional groups also provide entertainment to the people. In urban areas cinema, opera are a common source of entertainment. Besides this recreational clubs are also functioning in the district.

=== Tourism ===
Boudh is known for its century-old temples, ancient Buddha statues, and caves. With the spread of Saivism, Vaishnavism and a number of other cults, numerous shrines dedicated to various deities were found in this region. The notable temples and other tourist attractions includes:

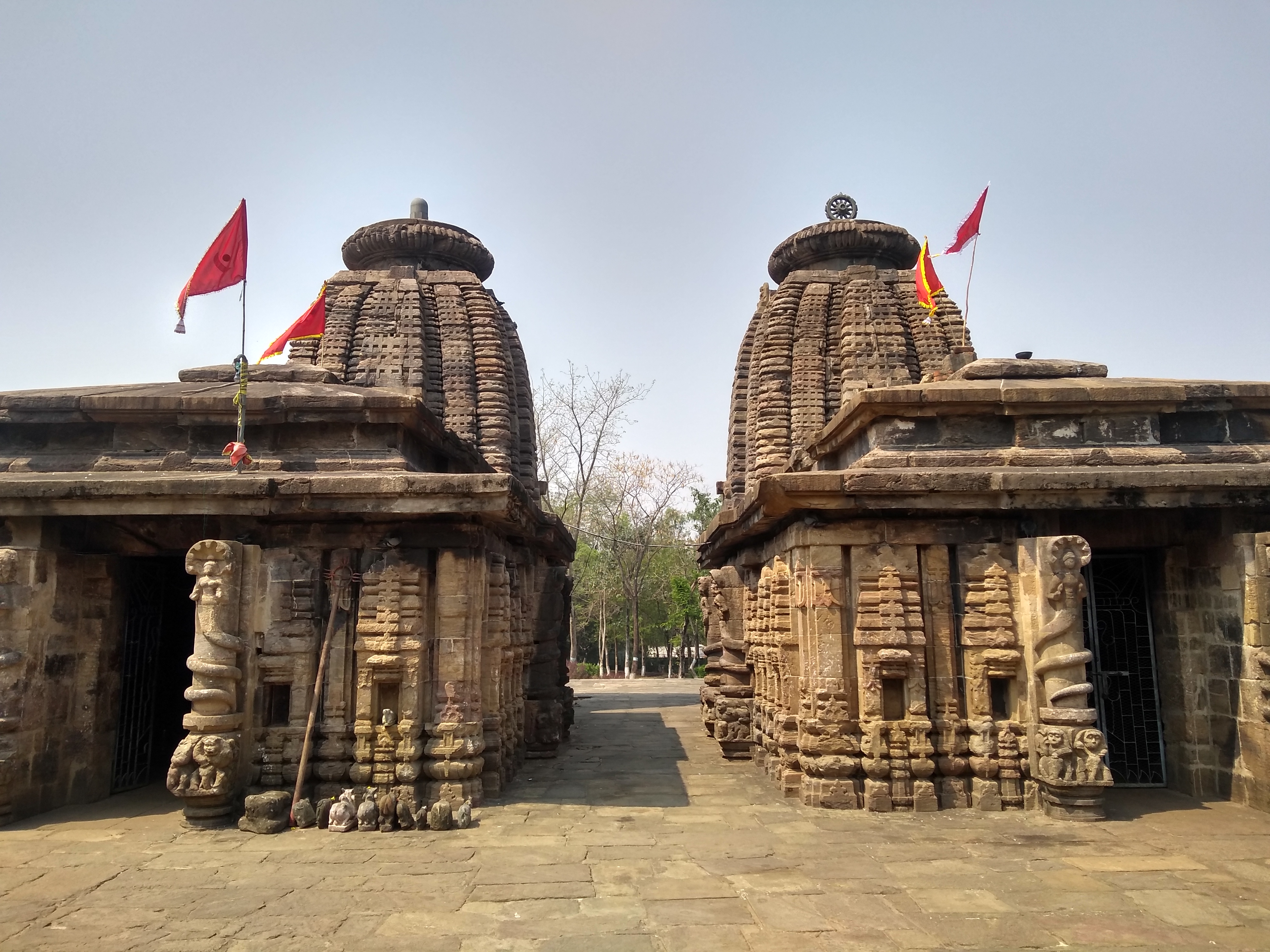
Chari Sambhu Temple.

- Buddha Statues
- Ramanath Temple
- Jogindra Villa Palace
- Hanuman Temple
- Chandra Chuda and Matengeswar Temple
- Madan Mohan Temple
- Jagannath Temple
- Debagarh
- Chari Sambhu Temple
- Purunakatak
- Swapnewar Temple

=== Places of Interest ===
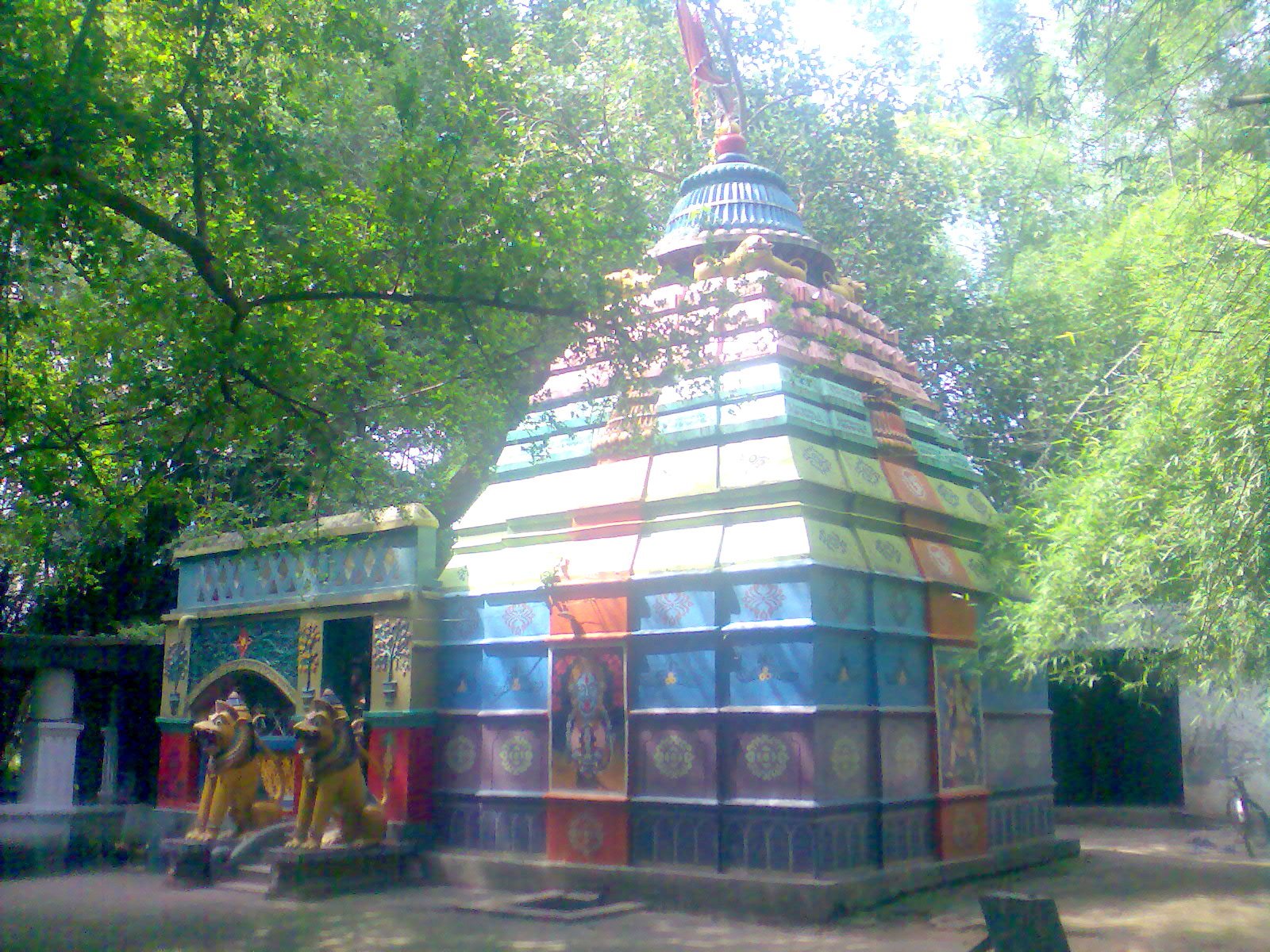
Bhairabi Temple, Purunakatak.

- Padmatola Sanctuary
- Dambarugada Mountains
- Nayakpada Cave (Patali Shrikhetra)
- Marjakud Island
- Khandikanpa

Apart from the above places, there are numerous tourist attractions in Boudh, including Asurgada, Shiva temple at Karadi, Sarsara and Baunsuni, Jatasamadhi temple at Balasinga (Temple of Mahima Cult), and Paljhir Dam.

== Legislation ==
=== Vidhan Sabha Constituencies ===
The following are the 2 Vidhan sabha constituencies of Boudh district and the elected members of that area are:

No.	Constituency	Reservation	Member of 16th Assembly	Party
85	Kantamal	None	Kanhai Charan Danga	BJP
86	Boudh	None	Saroj Pradhan	BJP

=== Lok Sabha constituency ===
The Boudh district comes in the Lok Sabha constituency of Kandhamal and the elected member of that area is:

No.	Constituency	Reservation	Member of 18th Lok Sabha	Party
13	Kandhamal	Unserved	Sukanta Kumar Panigrahi	BJP

== See also ==
- Boudh
- Kandhamal (Lok Sabha constituency)
