= Rudra Madhab Ray =

Indian politician

Rudra Madhab Ray (23 November 1937 – 31 May 2016) was an Indian politician. He was a member of the Indian Parliament, and represented Kandhamal (Lok Sabha constituency). He was suspended from Biju Janata Dal on 12 April 2014 for his alleged role in anti-party activities. Rudramadhab died on 31 May 2016 after prolonged illness.
