= Hemendra Chandra Singh =

Indian politician

Member: 16th Lok Sabha
- In office 2014 – 5 September 2014
- Preceded by: Rudramadhab Ray
- Constituency: Kandhamal

Personal details
- Born: 29 September 1967
- Died: 5 September 2014 (aged 46) Bhubaneswar
- Cause of death: Myocardial infarction
- Party: Biju Janata Dal
- Other political affiliations: Indian National Congress
- Spouse: Kunwarani Pratyusha
- Children: Dakshayani Manjari Singh and Aranyaraj Kishore Singh
- Education: Rajkumar College, Raipur
- Profession: Politician

Hemendra Chandra Singh (29 September 1967 – 5 September 2014) was an Indian politician. He was elected to the 16th Lok Sabha in 2014 from Kandhamal constituency in Odisha. He was a member of the Biju Janata Dal (BJD) political party. He had left Congress and joined BJD in February 2014.

Born in the royal family of Nayagarh, Hemendra was the Second Child of Late Maharaja B.K.Singh & Maharani Lokrajaya. His elder brother was Gajendra Chandra Singh. Hemendra Chandra Singh a lok sabha candidate from Biju Janta Dal, from Kandhamal District Odisha, contested the 16th Lok Sabha General elections and won with a margin of 181017 (One Lakh Eighty One Thousand and Seventeen) votes from his nearest rival Shri Harihar Karan of Indian National congress.

He died on 5 September 2014 at Bhubaneswar, while undergoing treatment for myocardial infarction and sepsis.

== See also ==
- Indian general election, 2014 (Odisha)
