= National Highway 316A (India) =

National Highway in India

National Highway 316A

Route information
- Auxiliary route of NH 16
- Length: 355 km (221 mi)

Major junctions
- South end: Konark
- North end: Digha

Location
- Country: India
- States: Odisha, West Bengal

Highway system
- Roads in India; Expressways; National; State; Asian
← NH 316	→ NH 116B

National Highway 316A, commonly referred to as NH 316A is a national highway in India. It is a spur road of National Highway 16. NH-316A traverses the states of Odisha and West Bengal in India.

== Route ==
Odisha

Konark, Ratanpur, Satabhaya, Dhamra, Basudevpur, Talapada, Chandipur, Chandaneswar - West Bengal border.

A new link from NH-16 (Bhadrak) to Chandabali

West Bengal

Chandaneswar - Digha

== Junctions ==
NH 316 Terminal near Konark.
NH 116B Terminal near Digha.

== See also ==
- List of national highways in India
- List of national highways in India by state
