= National Highway 516A (India) =

National Highway in India

National Highway 516A
- Map of National Highway 516A in red

Route information
- Auxiliary route of NH 16
- Length: 98 km (61 mi)

Major junctions
- South end: Gopalpur port
- North end: Satpada

Location
- Country: India
- States: Odisha

Highway system
- Roads in India; Expressways; National; State; Asian
← NH 516	→ NH 316

National Highway 516A, commonly referred to as NH 516A is a national highway in India. It is a spur road of National Highway 16. NH-516A traverses the state of Odisha in India.

== Route ==
NH 516A connects Gopalpur port, with Satpada.

== Junctions ==
NH 516 Terminal near Gopalpur Port.
NH 316 Terminal near Satpada.

== See also ==
- List of national highways in India
- List of national highways in India by state
