= National Highway 516D (India) =

National highway in India

National Highway 516D
- Map of National Highway 516D in red

Route information
- Auxiliary route of NH 16
- Length: 57.7 km (35.9 mi)

Major junctions
- South end: Deverapalli
- North end: Jeelugumilli

Location
- Country: India
- States: Andhra Pradesh

Highway system
- Roads in India; Expressways; National; State; Asian
| ← NH 16 | → NH 365BB |

National Highway 516D, commonly referred to as NH 516D is a national highway in India. It is a spur road of National Highway 16. NH-516D traverses the state of Andhra Pradesh in India.

== Route ==
Deverapalli Bypass, Golladgudem, Gopalapuram, Jaganathapuram, Atchyutapuram, Koyyalgudem, Bayyanagudem, Seetampeta, Narasannapalem, Jangareddigudam, Vegavaram, Taduvai, Darbhagudem, Jeelugumilli.

== Junctions ==
NH 16 Terminal near Devarapalle.

== See also ==
- List of national highways in India
- List of national highways in India by state
