= National Highway 157A (India) =

National Highway in India

National Highway 157A
- Map of National Highway 157A in red

Route information
- Auxiliary route of NH 57
- Length: 36 km (22 mi)

Major junctions
- West end: Phulbani
- East end: Madhapur

Location
- Country: India
- States: Odisha

Highway system
- Roads in India; Expressways; National; State; Asian
← NH 157	→ NH 57

National Highway 157A, commonly referred to as NH 157A is a national highway in India. It is a secondary route of National Highway 57. NH-157A runs in the state of Odisha in India.

== Route ==
NH157A connects Phulbani, Jamujhari, Dutimendi, Khajuripada and Madhapur in the state of Odisha.

== Junctions ==
NH 157 Terminal near Phulbani.
NH 57 Terminal near Madhapur.

== See also ==
- List of national highways in India
- List of national highways in India by state
