= Dhutiguda =

Coordinates: 19.070229°N 82.631827°E

Dhutiguda is a small village in Borigumma block of Koraput district, Odisha, India. Most of the people are farmers, daily wagers and very less government employees.

== Location ==
It is located 10 km away from Borigumma town. It comes under the Benasur Panchayat Samiti. Mainly, pentia community lives here.
