= National Highway 516E (India) =

National highway in India

National Highway 516E
- Map of the National Highway in red
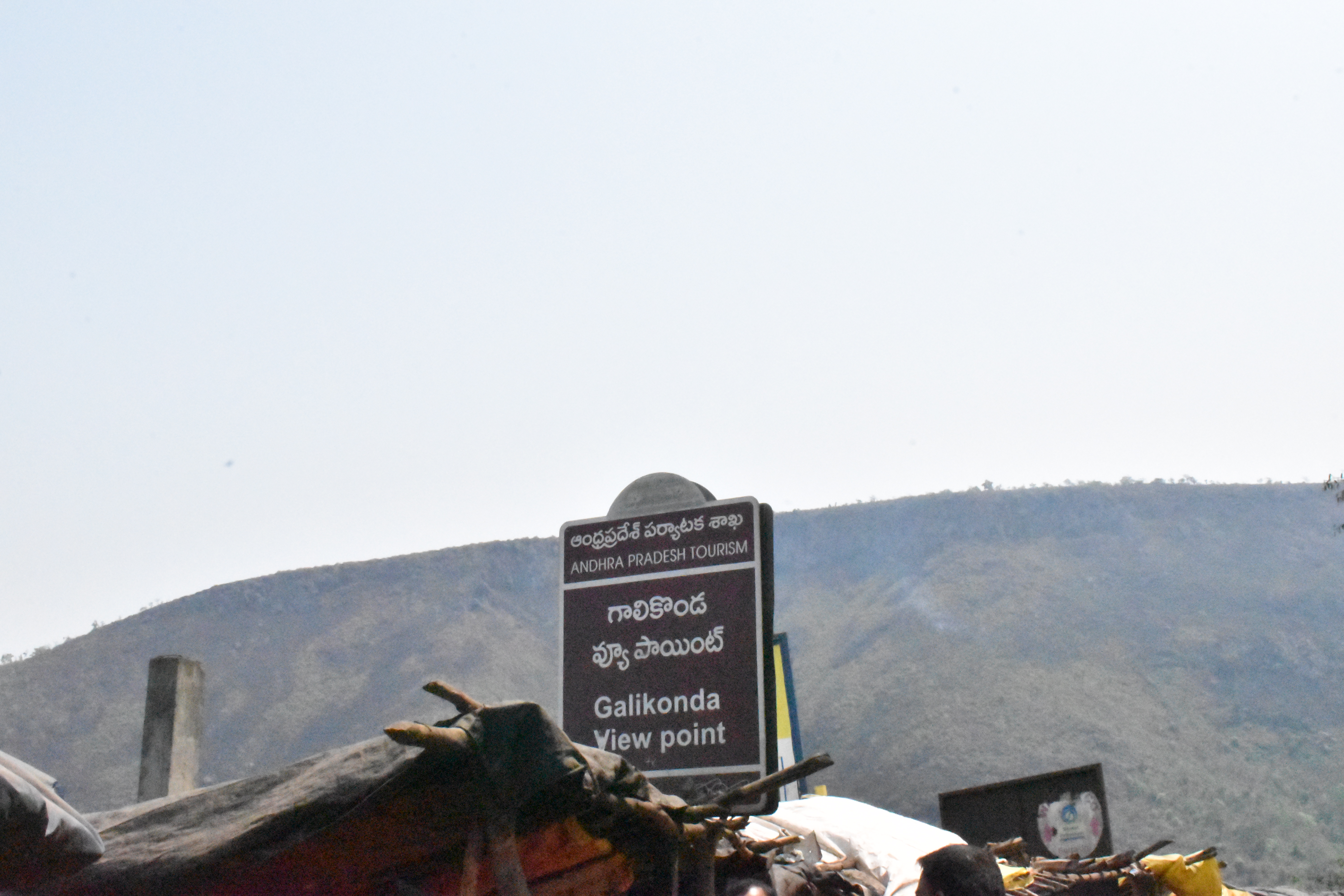
- Galikonda view point on NH 516E

Route information
- Length: 406 km (252 mi)

Major junctions
- South end: Rajamundry
- North end: Vizianagaram

Location
- Country: India
- States: Andhra Pradesh

Highway system
- Roads in India; Expressways; National; State; Asian
| ← NH 16 | → NH 26 |

National Highway 516E, commonly called NH 516E is a national highway in India. It is a spur road of National Highway 16. NH-516E traverses the state of Andhra Pradesh in India.

== Green National Highways Corridor Project ==
The highway is being widened under the "Green National Highways Corridor Project" (GNHCP), with a $500 million loan from the World Bank out of the total project cost of $1288.24 million. A 210 km stretch from Koyyuru to Vizianagaram is part of this project. The project aims to promote environmentally sustainable highways and strengthen institutional capacity in the Ministry of Road Transport and Highways. However, it has drawn criticism for its environmental and social impacts, especially the tribal regions.

== Issues ==
Widening NH 516E has raised concerns over deforestation, with over 7,000 trees—including teak in reserve forests—felled. While compensatory afforestation was promised on 120 hectares, progress is unclear. The highway passes through Scheduled Tribal Areas like Koyyuru, Chintapalli, and Araku. Locals allege that rerouting occurred without proper environmental or social impact assessments, affecting water sources and livelihoods. Only four out of nine villages reportedly held Gram Sabhas, with low attendance. Activists claim violations of the PESA Act, which requires tribal consent for such projects. Quarrying for materials has raised further environmental concerns.

== Route ==
Rajamundry, Junction with SH38/41 south of Rampachodavaram,Rajavommangi, Koyyuru, Chintapalli, Addateegala Lambasingi, Vanjari, G.Madugula, Paderu, Araku, Bowadara, Tadipudi, Vizianagaram.

== Junctions ==
NH 16 Terminal in Rajamundry.
NH 26 Terminal near Vizianagaram.

== See also ==
- List of national highways in India
- List of national highways in India by state
