= NH 116 =

NH 116 may refer to:

- National Highway 116 (India)
- New Hampshire Route 116, United States
