= Maulsinga =

Village in Boudh District, Odisha, India

Maulsinga, also known as Maulsingha, is a village in the Boudh District of Odisha, India.

The village is situated adjacent to Butupali. This village is very close to Boudh town and comes under Harbhanga block. It is located on the side of road connecting Charichak, Purunakatak, Butupali and Boudh town.

As the name suggests the name of the village is given after goddess Mauli. According to Odisha government sources this village is spread over 250.720 acres (101.463 ha) of land. This village has a school. The villagers are farmers, fishermen and daily workers. Some are also employed in the government and private sectors.

The village is home to a Radha-Krishna temple. In 2023, a person died during a Danda Nata procession in the village.
