= National Highway 365BB (India) =

National highway in India

National Highway 365BB
- Map of the National Highway in red

Route information
- Auxiliary route of NH 65
- Length: 254.4 km (158.1 mi)

Major junctions
- West end: Suryapet
- East end: Kovvur (Rajamahendravaram)

Location
- Country: India
- States: Telangana, Andhra Pradesh
- Primary destinations: Suryapet, Khammam

Highway system
- Roads in India; Expressways; National; State; Asian
← NH 65	→ NH 16

National Highway 365BB is a national highway in India. It is a secondary route of National Highway 65. NH-365BB traverses the states of Telangana and Andhra Pradesh in India. It starts at Suryapet and ends at Kovvur(Rajamahendravaram).Major cities on this route are Suryapet, Khammam and Rajamahendravaram.

== Route ==
Telangana

Suryapet, Chivvemla, Mothey, Kusumanchi, Khammam, Wyra, Thallada, Mittapalli, Kalluru, Sattupalli, Ashwaraopeta - Andhra Pradesh Border.

Andhra Pradesh

Telangana border - Chintalapudi, T. Narasapuram, Jangareddigudem, Koyyalagudem, Gopalapuram, Devarapalli Mandals (Rajamahendravaram).

== Project details ==
The National Highways Authority of India (NHAI) has proposed to construct the four-lane access controlled greenfield highway of a length of little over 162 km connecting Khammam of Telangana with Andhra Pradesh’s Devarapalli at an estimated cost of ₹4,609 crore.

The project was approved under the centrally-sponsored Bharatmala Pariyojana’s economic corridor development initiative more than one-and-a-half years ago.

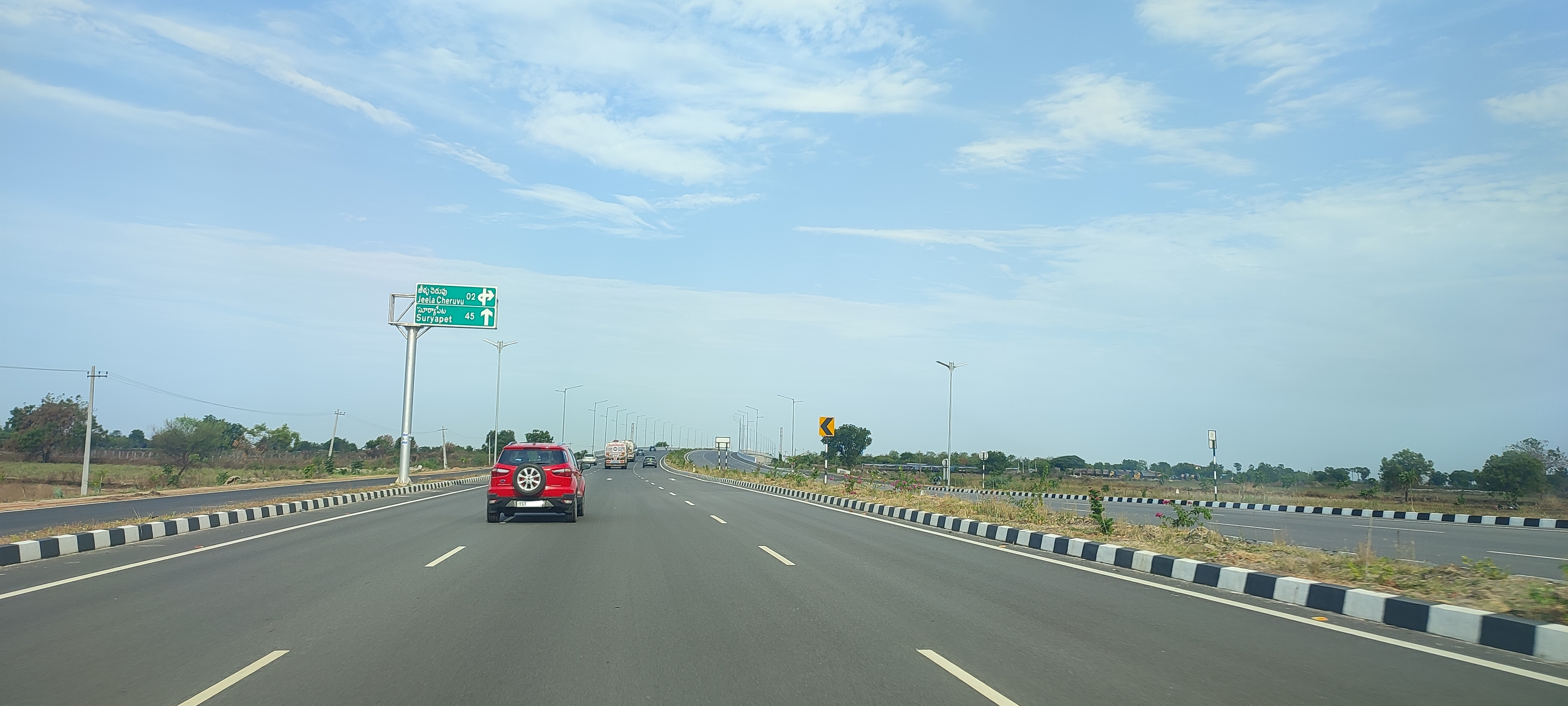
New Khammam - Suryapet highway as part of National Highway 365BB

The project involves acquisition of about 1,996 acres of agricultural lands spread in 31 villages of ten mandals of the district. The proposed greenfield express highway is likely to extend a distance of 96 km in Khammam district.

The project was inaugurated on 1 October, 2023 by PM Modi.

== Junctions ==
NH 65 Terminal near Suryapet.
NH 365A near Khammam
NH 563 near Khammam
NH 365BG near Khammam
NH 30 near Tiruvuru
NH 516D near Jeelugumilli
NH 16 Terminal near Kovvur(Rajamahendravaram).

== See also ==
- Khammam–Devarapalli Expressway
- List of national highways in India
- List of national highways in India by state

== Sources ==
https://www.thehindu.com/news/cities/Hyderabad/survey-for-4-lane-greenfield-highway-begins/article31996962.ece

https://www.deccanchronicle.com/nation/current-affairs/280219/khammam-greenfield-highway-project-stalled-due-to-land-problems.html
