= Digha Gate =

Gateway in Digha, India

Coordinates: 21°38′09″N 87°31′33″E

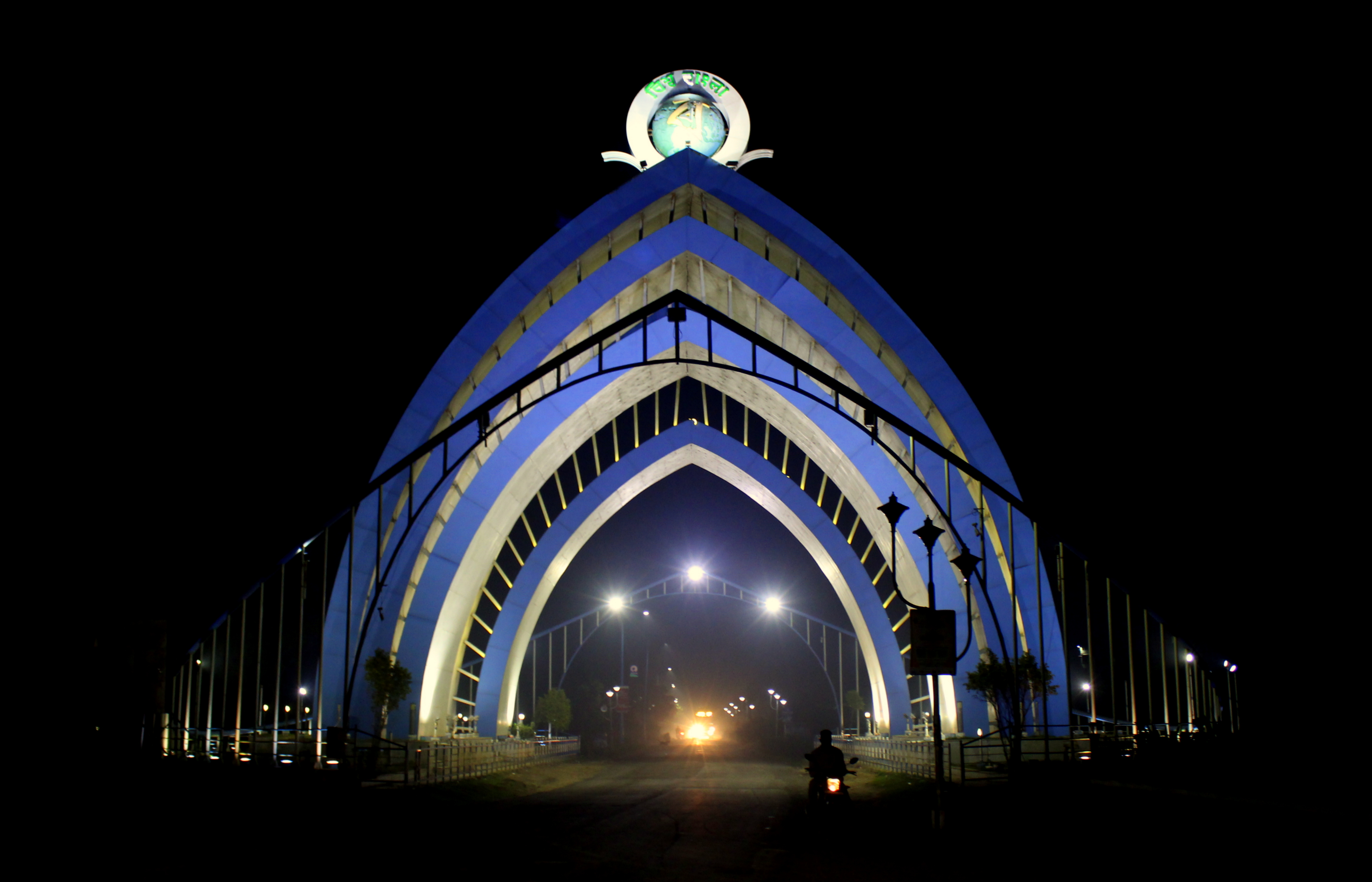
Sea Beach Digha, before reaching the town, Digha Gate, built on National Highway 116B, Gharshai Mauza.

Digha Gate is an entrance gate built on the National Highway 116B in the coastal town of Digha, India, near the Bay of Bengal. The gate is also known as the Gateway of Digha and the Digha Welcome Gate. The gate was formerly known as Brighton of Calcutta.

Construction was completed in late 2014. On 25 November 2014, it was inaugurated by Chief Minister of West Bengal, Mamata Banerjee.

== Location ==
The gate was built in Gorsi Mouja after the Alakeshpur on the Highway of Kolkata to Digha via Mechada.

== Design ==
The gate was built with Ligha gate steel and concrete. The main part of the gate is in the center with two smaller gates in front and behind it. The main gate, or entrance gate, was inspired by fishermen. It is shaped like a fishing boat and painted blue and white. The gate is illuminated at night.

== Construction cost ==
Construction cost was predicted at more than ₹ 4 crore rupees. The actual cost was ₹ 6.57 crore rupees (US $1.31 million).
