= Turaga Janaki Rani =

Indian broadcaster and writer

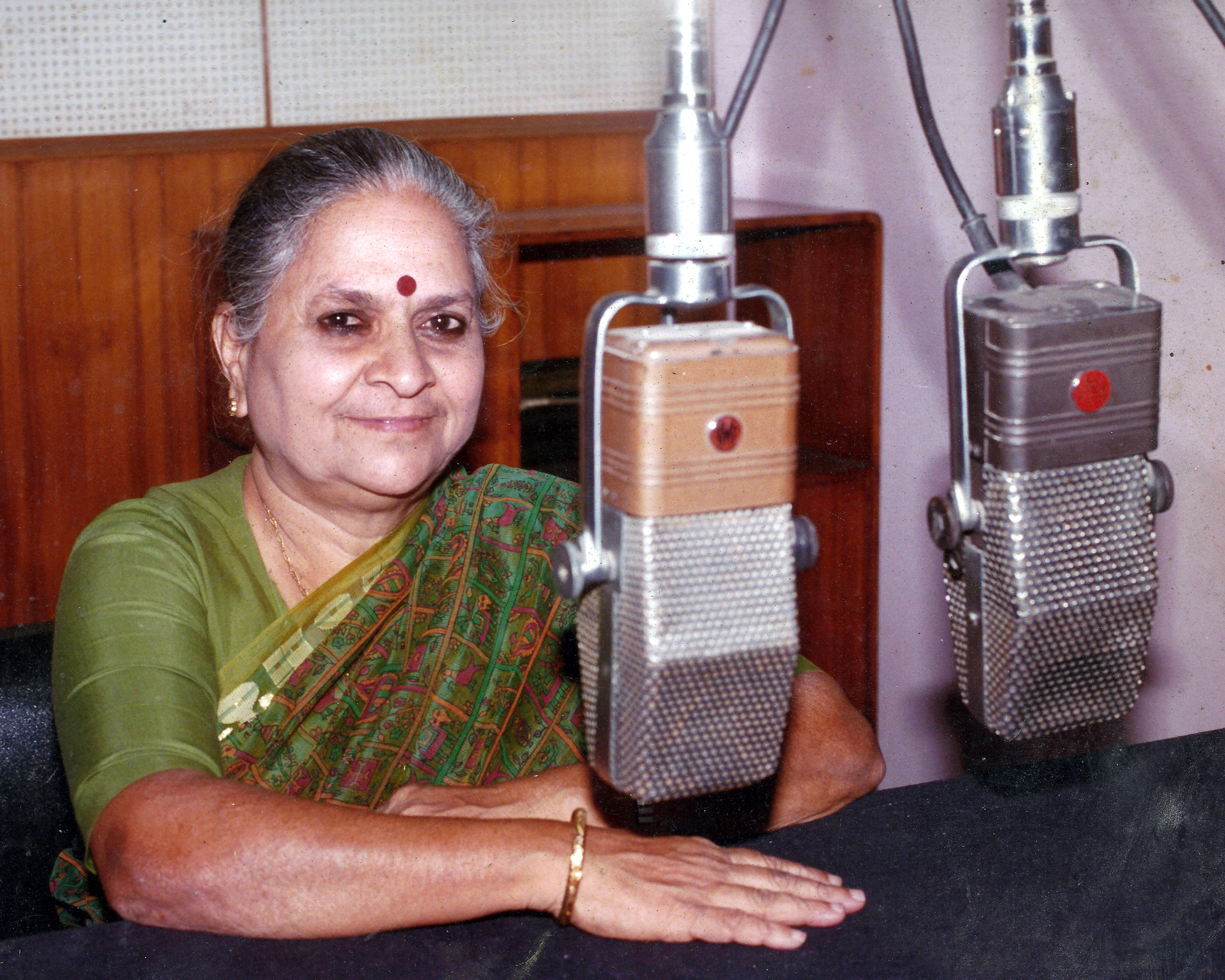
- Born: 31 August 1936; Machilipatnam
- Died: 15 October 2014 (aged 78)
- Citizenship: Indian
- Education: Andhra University, Osmania University
- Occupations: broadcaster, social activist
- Spouse: Krishna Mohan Rao
- Children: Usha Ramani, Vasantha Shobha

Turaga Janaki Rani (31 August 1936 – 15 October 2014) was an Indian broadcaster, social activist and a writer worked with All India Radio for two decades. Popularly known as Radio Akkayya (Radio Sister).

== Early life ==
Turaga Janaki Rani was born in August 1936 in Machilipatnam, Krishna District, Andhra Pradesh, India. She did her schooling from Lady Ampthill school and school final from Hindu College, Machilipatnam.

== Education and personal life ==
She did her post graduation in Indian History, Telugu, and Economics from Andhra University. She also did her post graduation degree in Economics from Nizam College in Hyderabad. She was married to Krishna Mohan Rao in 1959. They have two daughters, Usha Ramani and Vasantha Shobha.

== Career ==
Janaki Rani started her career in Central Social Welfare Board in 1958 as Welfare Officer, a central government voluntary organization for the welfare of disadvantaged sections of the society. She secured orientation certificate from Madras School of Social Work. During her service in the organization, she has initiated family and child welfare projects in tribal areas like Ashwaraopeta, Wankhidi and Addateegala. During her tenure, she also edited the official magazine of the board, ‘Subhashini’.

She joined All India Radio in 1974 as producer and retired as Assistant Station Director at Hyderabad in 1994. She handled the planning, production, and presentation of programs for women, children, senior citizens and working women. In collaboration with Department of Education, Panchayati raj, Osmania University and UNICEF she has created many programs focusing on universal primary education (andariki chaduvu). She has designed a unique IEC campaign on child rights and child labour, Bala Jagriti, produced audio cassettes for UNICEF.

She has initiated many series of radio programs to motivate children, to plant a sapling (nenoka mokka natanu) and Each one Teach one (a person making another literate) are popular among them. She also produced 45 jingles on good behavior, health, and nutrition which were borrowed by the National Institute of Nutrition.

She also has initiated many series of programs in collaboration with Department of Education, Panchayati Raj, Osmania University and UNICEF. She has designed unique IEC campaigns on child rights and child labor, Bala Jagriti, produced audio cassettes for UNICEF.

She also produced audio cassettes for NCERT pre-school children, Acharya NG Ranga University, streemela, nawaangi, smokeless chulah for Non-Conventional Energy Development Corporation, Save the Children, UK on children for PLHIV in Telugu, Hindi, and Oriya.

In association with Andhra Mahila Sabha, Janaki Rani brought out plays and songs for pre-school children. She also contributed to Suraksha, the AP Police Magazine, penned skits and conducted the programme called CAP(Children and Police) on child rights.

Janaki Rani has helped in formulating International Labour Organization manuals and workbooks on child rights to Telugu for MCRHRD Institute, and also translated series of nine books on women and law.

She had won Akashvani National Award for four times for her documentaries on the hearing impaired(Nissabdamlo Prema Naadalu), about the aged(Ashrayam) and chorus songs by children.

== Literature ==
She wrote three short story anthologies, three novels, five books for children and also a collection of radio plays and features. Books published for children include The Story of Red Cross and Bangaaru Pilaka for the National Book Trust, Rebuild India, a translation of Swami Vivekananda’s book, published by Ramakrishna Math, B.Nandam Gaari Asupatri, a collection of plays published by the Jawahar Bal Bhavan, Mithayi Pottlam, collection of stories published by the Publications Division. Her short stories are also translated into English, Hindi, Bengali, Kannada, Oriya, Marathi and Tamil.

== Art and culture ==
Diploma holder in Bharatanatyam, she not only performed but also choreographed ballets for Doordarshan.
