= Paberi =

Paberi is a village near Phulbani in Kandhamal district of Odisha state of India.
