= NH 126 =

NH 126 may refer to:

- National Highway 126 (India)
- New Hampshire Route 126, United States
