= Pattupalli =

Patupalli
- Interactive map of Patupalli
- Coordinates: 13°27′5.4″N 80°10′8.84″E
- Country: India
- State: Tamil Nadu
- District: Thiruvallur
- Taluk: Ponneri

Population
  - Total: 680

Pattupalli is a village in Ponneri Taluk, Thiruvallur district in the Indian state of Tamil Nadu.

== Demographics ==
Pattupalli had a population of 680. Males constitute 50% of the population and females 50%.

Pattupalli has an average literacy rate of 70%, higher than India's national average of 59.5%: male literacy is 85%, and female literacy is 60%. 20% of the population is under 6. Tamil is the official language.

== Transport ==
Pattupalli lies 10 km from National Highway 5 from Chennai to Calcutta.

Arul murugan Bus Transport provides transport.

== Amenities ==
Pattupalli lake is the biggest and cleanest lake among the 10 surrounding the village amidst a eucalyptus tree forest range.

A 300 year old banyan tree is located by achiyamman temple east of Pattupalli.
