= Patuari =

Coordinates: 19.977347°N 85.817381°E

Patuari is a village in the borough of Sakhigopal on the River Bhargavi in Puri district of the Indian state of Odisha. It is located about 17 km north from district headquarters Puri and 42 km from state capital Bhubaneswar.

Pincodes near Patuari: 752012 (Chandanpur), 752014 (Sakhigopal), 752046 (Satasankha) Main are occupied by the tenant no.1, is the, Regional Coconut Research Farm, (Established in the, year- 1955 consisting of about 120 acres ), Government of Odisha.

== Demographics ==
Oriya is the local language here; Hindi and English are widely spoken and understood.

== Transport ==
=== By air ===
Bhubaneswar Airport is about 40 km from Patuari; the airport has frequent flight connection with Delhi, Mumbai, Kolkata, Hyderabad and Chennai.

=== By road ===
National Highway 203 from Bhubaneshwar to Puri connects the village. It is about 40 minutes drive from Bhubaneshwar and 20 minutes drive from Puri.

=== By rail ===
SakhiGopal Railway Station, Birpurusothampr Railway Station are the very nearby railway stations to Patuari. However, Puri railway station is major railway station 17 from Patuari.
