= Digha Heliport =

Digha Helipad
- IATA: none; ICAO: none

Summary
- Airport type: Helipad
- Owner: Government of West Bengal
- Operator: Government of West Bengal
- Location: Digha, Purba Medinipur, West Bengal
- Coordinates: 21°37′34″N 87°30′04″E
- Interactive map of Digha Helipad

Helipads
Number	Length		Surface
Number	ft	m	Surface
			Concrete

Digha Heliport is located at Digha, West Bengal, India. Chief Minister Mamata Banerjee inaugurated the new facility on 23 December 2015. The heliport's commercial service started on 26 December 2015.

The heliport, owned by the Government of West Bengal, is the first of its kind in the country. The heliport is spread over 25 acres, a few kilometres away from the Digha sea-beach. The flights are only operated on Sundays and take roughly 40 to 45 minutes.

== Destination and Airlines ==
Airlines	Destination
PairAir	Behala
