= Rajapulova =

- village
- Interactive map of Rajapulova
- Location in Andhra Pradesh, India
- Coordinates: 17°57′23″N 83°25′20″E
- Country: India
- State: Andhra Pradesh
- District: Vizianagaram

Languages
  - Official: Telugu
- Time zone: UTC+5:30 (IST)
- Vehicle registration: AP35

Rajapulova is a village and major road junction in Vizianagaram district, Andhra Pradesh, India, where National Highway 26 (India) from Raipur meets NH 16.

== Demographics ==
According to Indian census, 2001, the demographic details of this village is as follows:

- Total Population: 2,315 in 493 Households.
- Male Population: 1,136
- Female Population: 1,179
- Children Under 6-years of age: 429 (Boys - 217 and Girls - 212)
- Total Literates: 761
