= National Highway 157 (India) =

National highway in India

National Highway 157
- Map of National Highway 157 in red

Route information
- Length: 159 km (99 mi)

Major junctions
- North end: Purunakatak
- South end: Asika

Location
- Country: India
- States: Odisha

Highway system
- Roads in India; Expressways; National; State; Asian
← NH 57	→ NH 59

National Highway 157, commonly referred to as NH 157 is a national highway in India. It is a spur road of National Highway 57. NH-157 traverses the state of Odisha in India.

== Route ==
Purunakatak, Phulbani, Kalinga, Bhanjanagar, Asika.

== Junctions ==
NH 57 Terminal near Purunakatak.
NH 59 Terminal near Asika.

== See also ==
- List of national highways in India
- List of national highways in India by state
