= Phulbani Odia =

Phulabani Odia/Phulbani Odia (ଫୁଲବାଣୀ ଓଡିଆ), is a minor dialect of Odia language spoken in Phulbani, Khajuripada block, Phiringia Block of Kandhamal and parts of Boudh district. The Odia spoken form of Phulbani & Boudh is influenced by the tribal language like Kui & also by Kalahandia Odia. It is inclined more towards Standard Odia variety.

Here are few of the typical Phulbani Odia words and their synonyms in standard Odia:

Standard Odia	Phulabani Odia/Phulbani Odia
Kana (କଣ/କଅଣ)	Kada (କାଡା)
Kouthi (କୋଉ)	Keney (କେନେ)
Tarakari (ତରକାରି)	Tun (ତୁ୍ଣ୍)
Loka (ଲୋକ)	Luka (ଲୁକ)
Gudie (ଗୁଡ଼ିଏ)	Jaka (ଜାକ)
Bartamaan (ବର୍ତ୍ତମାନ)	Eleygi (ଈଲେଗି)
Kahinki (କାହିଁକି)	Kaelagi (କାଈଲାଗି)
Ousadh (ଔଷଧ)	Usha (ଉଷ)
Bijhiba (ଭିଜିବା)	Tintiba (ତିନ୍ତିବା)
