= National Highway 26 (India) =

National highway in India

National Highway 26
- Map of the National Highway in red

Route information
- Length: 555 km (345 mi)

Major junctions
- North end: NH 53 in Bargarh, Odisha
- List: NH 126 / NH 126A in Barapali, Odisha; NH 57 in Balangir, Odisha; NH 59 in Belgaon, Odisha; NH 130C in Junagarh, Odisha; NH 63 in Borigumma, Odisha; NH 326 in Jeypore, Odisha; NH 516E in Vizianagaram, Andhra Pradesh
- South end: NH 16 in Natavalasa Road, Vizianagaram district, Andhra Pradesh

Location
- Country: India
- States: Chhattisgarh, Odisha, Andhra Pradesh
- Primary destinations: Bargarh - Balangir - Kesinga - Bhawanipatna - Borigumma - Rajapulova - Vizianagaram

Highway system
- Roads in India; Expressways; National; State; Asian
← NH 25	→ NH 27

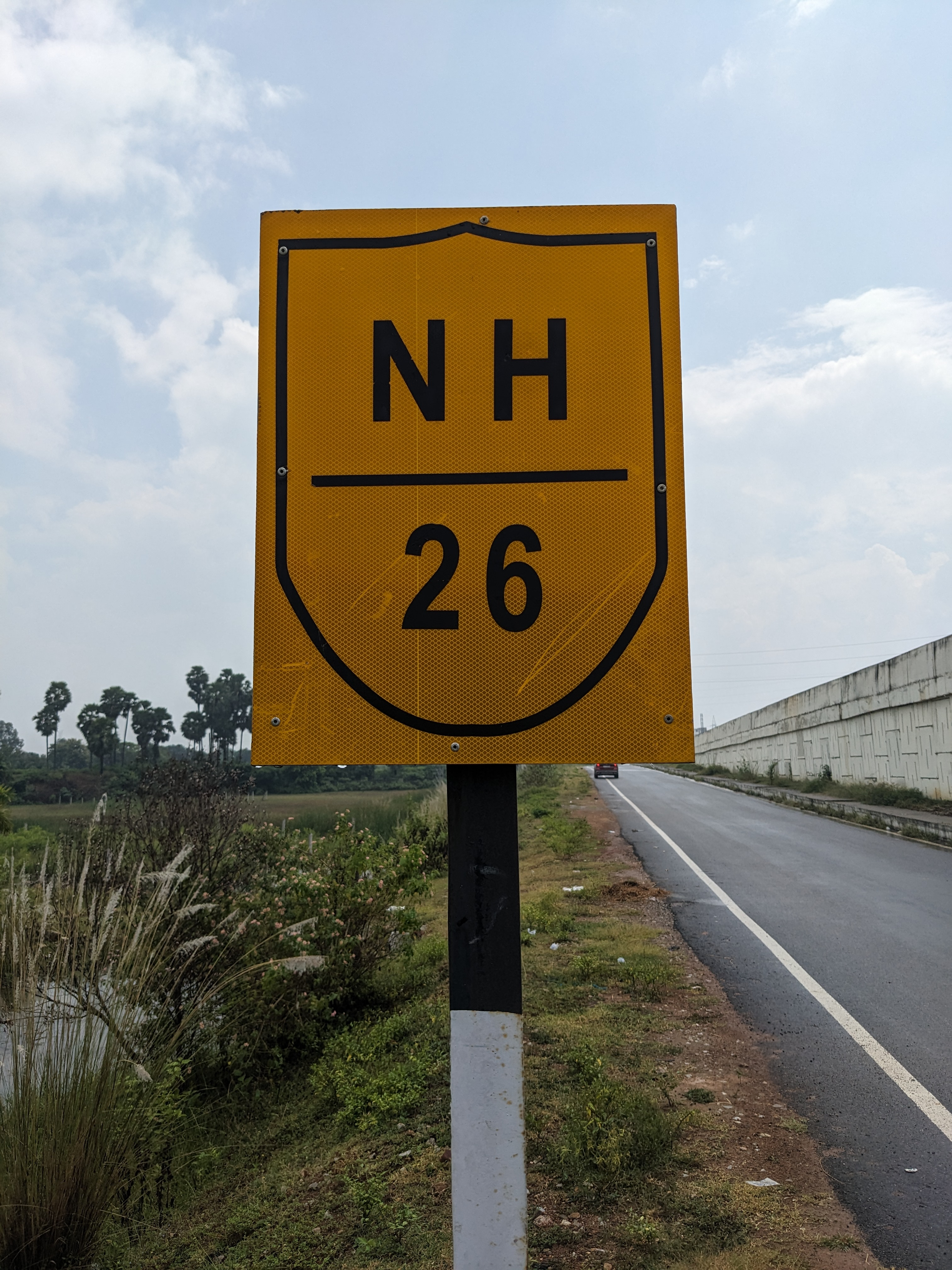
NH26 at Vizianagaram bypass

National Highway 26 (NH 26), previously National Highway 43, is a National Highway in India, that connects Bargarh in Odisha and passes through Odisha to connect with Rajapulova in Vizianagaram district of Andhra Pradesh. It connects NH 53 and NH 16 and transverses the Eastern Ghats.

== Route ==
The total length of the highway is 555 km (345 mi). It starts from NH 53 at Bargarh and ends at NH 16 at Rajapulova. Following is the statewise Break up Andhra Pradesh has 90.25 km (56.08 mi) long part. Chhattisgarh has 132.25 km (82.18 mi) long part. Odisha has 332.5 km (206.6 mi) long part.

The northern end at Borigumma is a junction of 2 highways: NH 26 to Bargarh and NH 63 towards Jagdalpur. The southern end at Rajapulova is on NH 16 which runs between Kolkata and Chennai.

== See also ==
- National Highways Development Project
- List of national highways in India
