= Addateegala mandal =

- Mandal
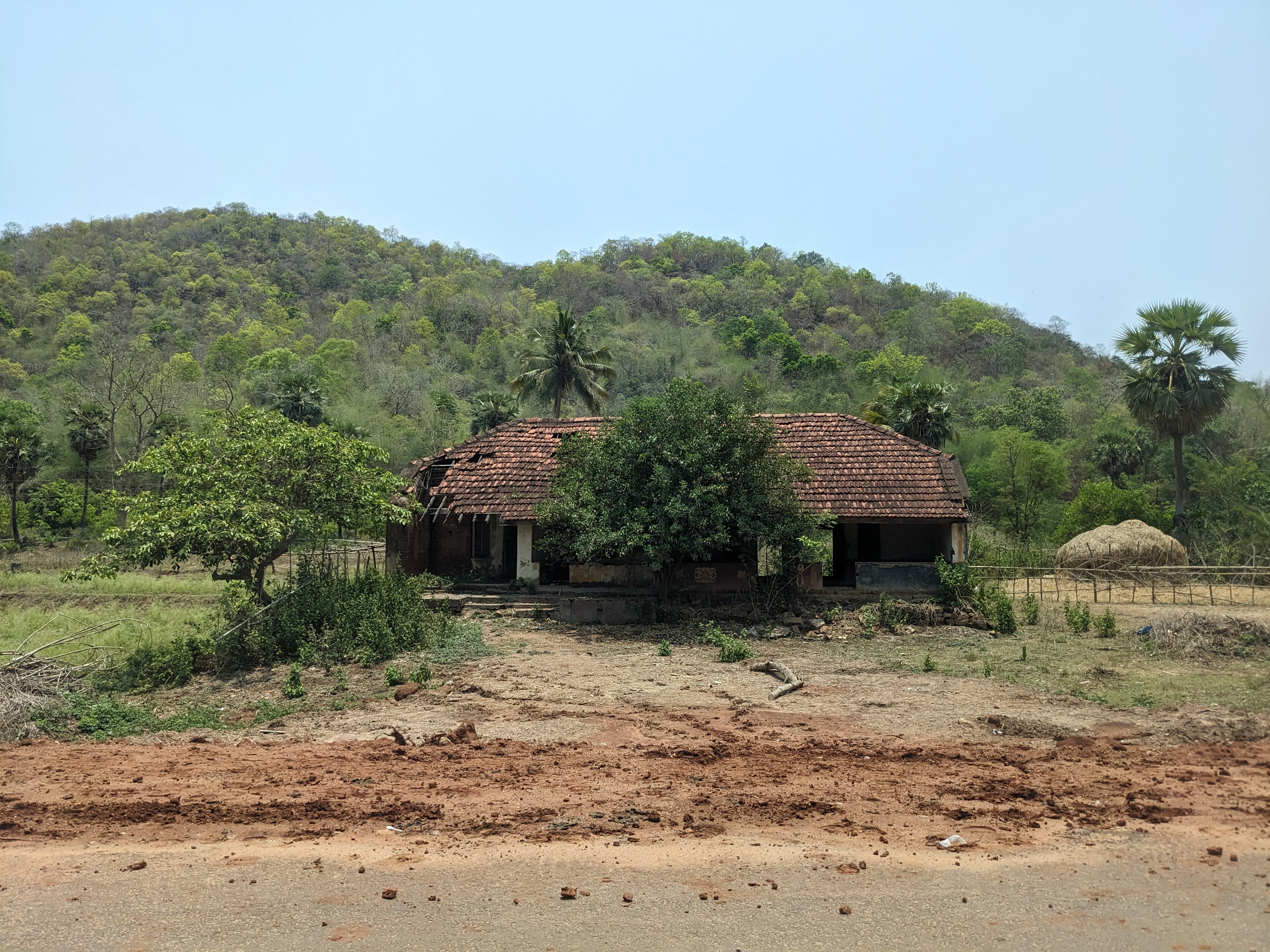
- Abandoned house in Addateegala mandal
- Interactive map of Addateegala mandal
- Country: India
- State: Andhra Pradesh
- District: Polavaram
- Headquarters: Addateegala

Area
  - Total: 540.38 km^{2} (208.64 sq mi)
- Time zone: UTC+5:30 (IST)

Addateegala mandal is one of the 12 mandals in Polavaram of Andhra Pradesh. The headquarters of the mandal is the village of Addateegala. At the time of the 2011 census the mandal included 90 villages.

== Demographics ==
Addateegala mandal had a total population of 37,241 at the time of the 2011 census, out of which 18,686 were male while 18,555 were female, with an average sex ratio of 993. The total literacy rate for Addateegala mandal was 57.86%. The male literacy rate was 56.05% and the female literacy rate was 47.25%.

== Towns & Villages ==
=== Villages ===
1. Addateegala
2. Anigeru
3. Anukulapalem
4. Atchiyyapeta
5. Badadam
6. Bandakonda
7. Bandamamillu
8. Bhimavaram
9. Bhimudupakalu
10. Bodlanka
11. Chakirevula
12. Chaparatipalem
13. Chikkapugedda
14. Chinamunakanagedda
15. Chinavadisakarra
16. Chinna
17. Chinnampadu
18. Chodavaram
19. D. Ammapeta
20. D. Kothuru
21. D. Krishnavaram
22. D. Pinjarikonda
23. D. Ramavaram
24. Dabbapalem
25. Dakodu
26. Darsinuthula @ Regulapadu
27. Dhanayampalem
28. Doddivaka
29. Dokkapalem
30. Doramamidi
31. Ducherthi
32. Duppalapalem
33. Gadichinnampalem
34. Gavarayyapeta
35. Gondolu
36. Gontuvanipalem
37. Jajipalem
38. Jalluru
39. Kalimamidi
40. Kimmuru
41. Kinaparti
42. Konalova
43. Kothurupadu
44. Kothurupadu
45. Kottampalem
46. Kottampalem
47. Kovelapalem
48. Languparti
49. Latchireddipalem
50. Makaram
51. Mallavaram Mamillu
52. Mamidipalem
53. Matlapadu
54. Mitlapalem
55. Mulakayala Bhimavaram
56. Nimmalapalem
57. Nukarai
58. Paidiputtapadu
59. Panasaloddi
60. Panukuratipalem
61. Papampeta
62. Pedamunakanagedda
63. Peddavadisakarra
64. Penikelapadu
65. Puligogulapadu
66. Rajanagaram
67. Ravigudem
68. Ravulapalem
69. Rayapalle
70. Rollagedda
71. Sarampeta
72. Sarampetapadu
73. Seetharam
74. Settipalle
75. Somannapalem
76. Thimmapuram
77. Thungamadugula
78. Tirumalawada
79. Tiyyamamidi
80. Uligogula
81. Uppalapadu
82. Vangalamadugu
83. Vedullakonda
84. Veerabhadrapuram
85. Veeravaram
86. Venkatanagaram
87. Vetamamidi
88. Vutlapalem
89. Yellapuram
90. Yellavaram

== See also ==
- List of mandals in Andhra Pradesh
