= National Highway 126A (India) =

National Highway in India

National Highway 126A
- Map of National Highway 126A in red

Route information
- Auxiliary route of NH 26
- Length: 57 km (35 mi)

Major junctions
- North end: Barapali
- South end: Sonepur

Location
- Country: India
- States: Odisha

Highway system
- Roads in India; Expressways; National; State; Asian
← NH 26	→ NH 57

National Highway 126A, commonly referred to as NH 126A is a national highway in India. It is a secondary route of National Highway 26. NH-126A runs in the state of Odisha in India.

== Route ==
NH126A connects sohelaBarapali, Rampur, Singhijuba, Bisalpalii, binika,mahadevpali shradhapali arjunpur chock

and Sonepur in the state of Odisha.[1][2]

== Junctions ==
NH 26 Terminal near Barapali.
NH 57 Terminal near Sonapur.

== See also ==
- List of national highways in India
- List of national highways in India by state
