= National Highway 16 (India) =

National highway in India

National Highway 16
- Map of National Highway 16 in red
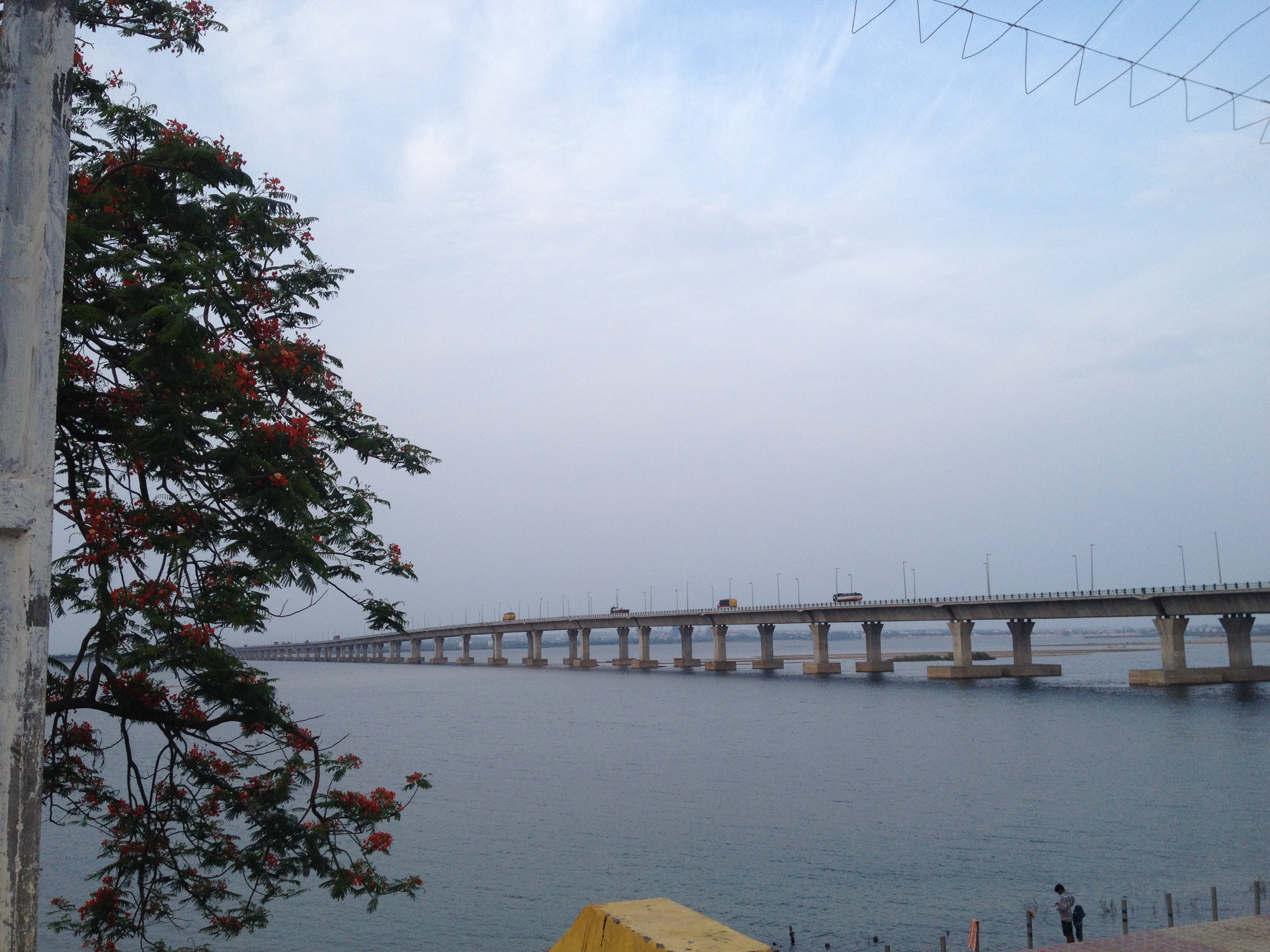
- Godavari 4th Bridge at Rajamahendravaram City on NH16 new alignment

Route information
- Part of AH45
- Length: 1,711 km (1,063 mi) GQ: 1711 km (Chennai–Kolkata)

Major junctions
- North end: Dankuni, Kolkata, West Bengal
- List: NH 19 in Dankuni (Near Kolkata); Belghoria Expressway in Dankuni(Near Kolkata); NH 116 in Kolaghat; NH 116B in Panskura; NH 116A in Panskura; NH 14 in Kharagpur; NH 49 in Kharagpur; NH 18 in Balasore; NH 20 in Panikoili; NH 53 in Chandikhole; NH 55 in Cuttack; National Highway 23A in Cuttack; NH 316 in Bhubaneswar; NH 57 in Khordha; NH 59 in Brahmapur; NH 26 in Rajapulova near Vizag; NH 216 in Kattipudi; NH 216A in Rajamahendravaram; NH 516E in Rajamahendravaram; NH 365BB in Kovvur near Rajahmundry; 516D in Devarapalli near Rajahmundry; NH 216A near Eluru; NH 65 in Vijayawada NH 544D in Guntur; NH 216 in Ongole; NH 71 in Naidupeta; NH 4 in Chennai; NH 45 in Chennai; NH 205 in Chennai
- South end: Chennai, Tamil Nadu

Location
- Country: India
- States: West Bengal: 111.7 km Odisha: 488 km Andhra Pradesh: 1,024 km Tamil Nadu: 45 km
- Primary destinations: Kolkata (junction of NH 49) - Kolaghat - Kharagpur - Balasore - Bhadrak - Cuttack - Bhubaneswar - Brahmapur - Srikakulam - Visakhapatnam - Rajamahendravaram - Eluru- Vijayawada -Amaravati - Guntur - Ongole - Nellore - Chennai

Highway system
- Roads in India; Expressways; National; State; Asian
← NH 19	→ NH 48

National Highway 16 (NH 16) or Grand Northern Trunk Road also known as Chennai - Kolkata Highway is a major National Highway in India that runs along east coast of West Bengal, Odisha, Andhra Pradesh, and Tamil Nadu. It was previously known as National Highway 5.

The northern terminal starts at Dankuni near Kolkata, West Bengal and the southern terminal ends at Nallur near Chennai, Tamil Nadu. It is a part of the Golden Quadrilateral project to connect India's major cities.

== Route ==
Schematic map of Renumbered National Highways in India

Many cities and towns across the states of West Bengal, Odisha, Andhra Pradesh, Telangana, and Tamil Nadu are connected by National Highway 16. NH 16 has a total length of 1,764 km (1,096 mi) and passes through the states of West Bengal, Odisha, Andhra Pradesh and Tamil Nadu.

Route length in states:

- West Bengal: 206 km (128 mi)
- Odisha: 529 km (329 mi)
- Andhra Pradesh: 992.25 km (616.56 mi)
- Tamil Nadu: 42.75 km (26.56 mi)

== Junctions list ==
West Bengal
NH 19 near Kolkata
NH 12 near Kolkata
NH 116 near Kolaghat
NH 116A near Panskura
NH 14 near Kharagpur
NH 49 near Kharagpur
Odisha
NH 18 near Baleshwar
NH 316A near Bhadrak
NH 20 near Panikoili
NH 53 near Chandikhol
NH 55 near Cuttack
NH 316 near Bhubaneswar
NH 57 near Khordha
NH 516A near Palur
NH 59 near Brahmapur
NH 516A near Brahmapur
Andhra Pradesh
NH 326A near Narasannapeta
NH 26 near Natavalsa
NH 216 at Kathipudi
NH 216A at Rajamahendravaram
NH 516E at Rajamahendravaram
NH 365BB at Kovvur near Rajamahendravaram
NH 516D at Devarapalli
NH 216A at Gundugolanu near Eluru
NH 65 at Vijayawada
NH 544D near Guntur
NH 167A Chilakaluripet
NH 216 near Ongole
NH 167B Singarayakonda
NH 167BG Kavali
NH 67 Nellore
NH 71 Naidupeta
Tamil Nadu
NH 716A Janappachataram
NH 716 Chennai
NH 48 Chennai Terminal point

== Toll plazas ==
The toll plazas from Kolkata to Chennai are listed below:

West Bengal
Dhulagori
Debra
Rampura (Kharagpur)
Odisha
Laxmannath (Jaleshwar)
Balasore
Bhandari Pokhari (Bhadrak)
Manguli
Godipada
Gurapali
Andhra Pradesh
Bellupada
Palasa
Madapam (Srikakulam)
Chilakapalem (Srikakulam)
Nathavalasa
Aganampudi (Visakhapatnam)
Vempadu
Krishnavaram
Ethakota (NH 216A)
Unguturu (NH 216A)
Kovvur state toll plaza at Godavari (EGK ROAD)
Veeravalli Yarnagudem Toll plaza (EGK ROAD)
Kalaparru (Eluru)
Pottipadu(Vijayawada)
Venkatapalem(Amaravati)
Kaza (Guntur)
Bollapali
Tanguturu
Musunnur
Venkatachalam
Budanam
Sullurupeta
Tamil Nadu
Gummidipoondi
Nallur (Chennai)

== See also ==
- List of national highways in India
- List of national highways in India by state

== Gallery ==
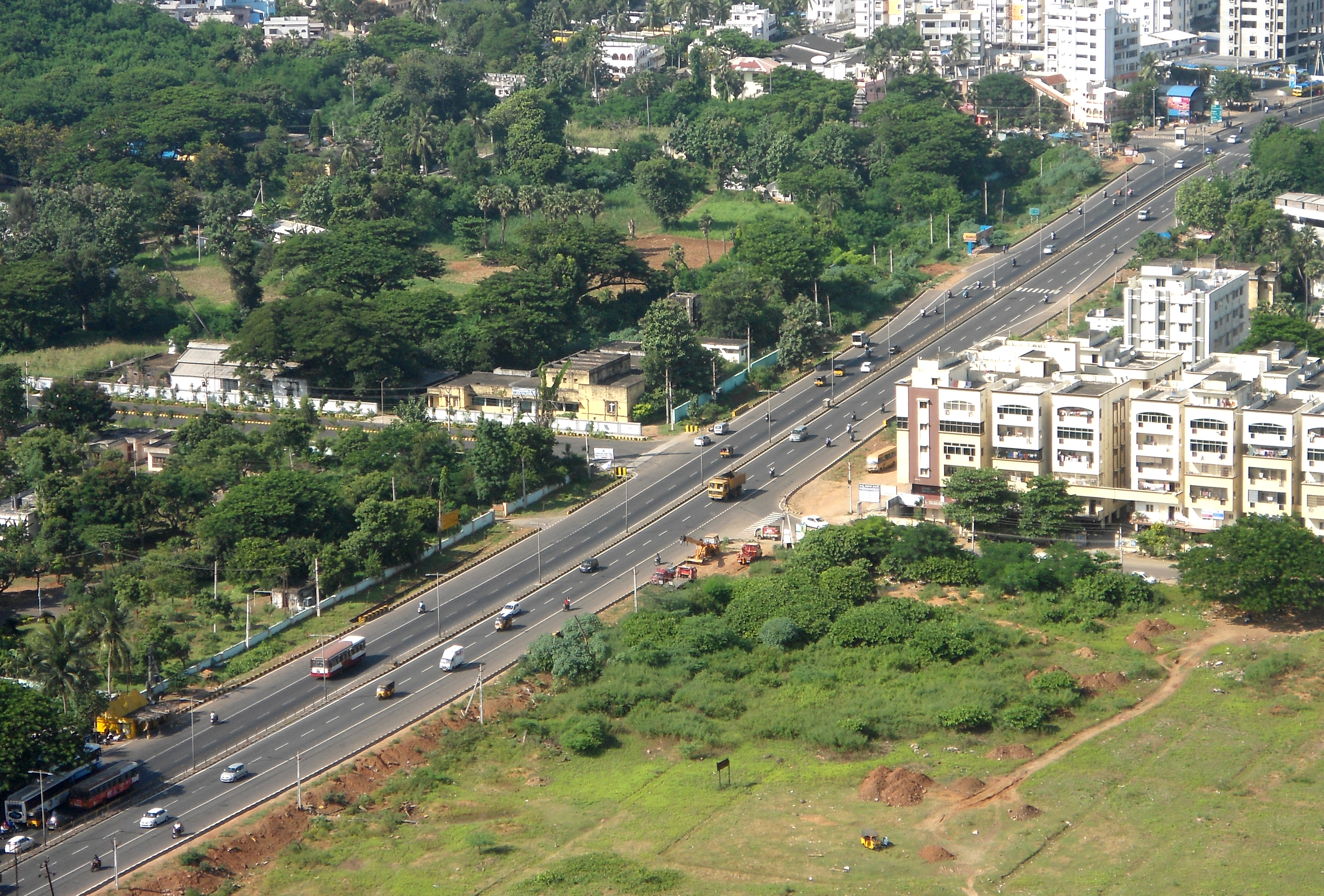
NH 16 view at Visakhapatnam

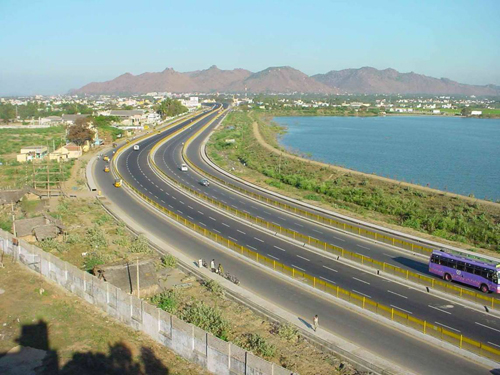
NH-16 in Tamil Nadu

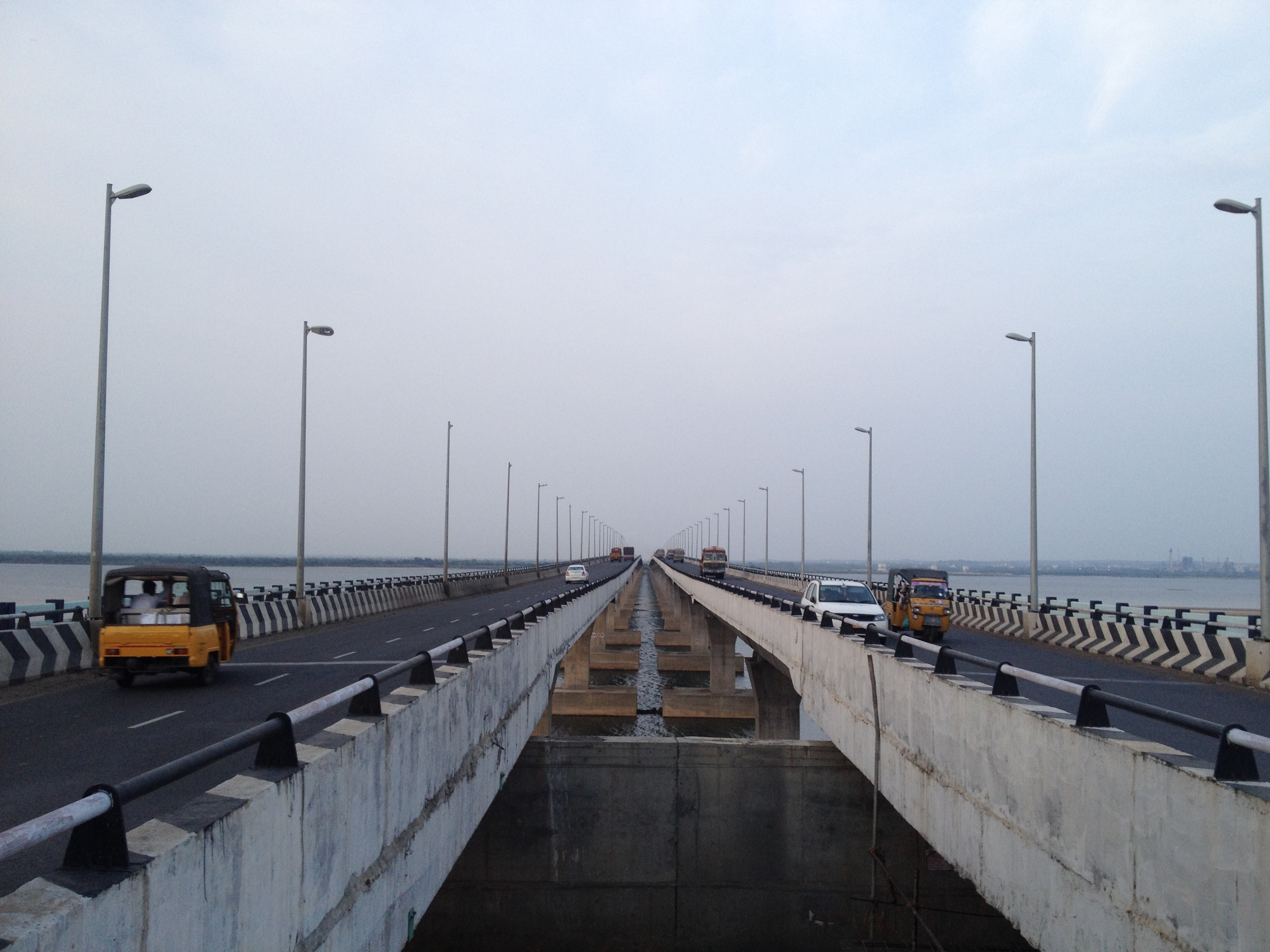
Godavari Fourth Bridge at Rajamahendravaram
