= National Highway 516 (India) =

National highway in India

National Highway 516
- Map of National Highway 516 in red

Route information
- Length: 5.92 km (3.68 mi)

Major junctions
- West end: Narendrapur, Odisha
- NH16
- To: Gopalpur, Odisha

Location
- Country: India
- States: Odisha: 8.3 km
- Primary destinations: Narendrapur – Gopalpur

Highway system
- Roads in India; Expressways; National; State; Asian
| ← NH 16 | → NH 1 |

National Highway 516 (NH 516) is a National Highway in India that connects Narendrapur with Gopalpur in Odisha. The total length of the highway is 8.3 km.

== Route ==
Narendrapur – Karpalli – Gopalpur

== See also ==
- List of national highways in India
- National Highways Development Project
