= National Highway 116 (India) =

National highway in India

National Highway 116
- Map of the National Highway in red

Route information
- Length: 52.7 km (32.7 mi)

Major junctions
- North end: Kolaghat, West Bengal
- SH 4 Radhamoni (Tamluk); NH 116B Nandakumar
- South end: Haldia, West Bengal

Location
- Country: India
- States: West Bengal
- Primary destinations: Kolaghat – Mecheda – Tamluk – Nandakumar – Haldia

Highway system
- Roads in India; Expressways; National; State; Asian
← NH 16	→ NH 116

National Highway 116 (NH 116) is a National Highway of India entirely within the state of West Bengal that connects Kolaghat in Purba Medinipur district with Haldia in Purba Medinipur district. The total length of NH 116 is 51 km (32 mi). NH-116 is a spur road of National Highway 16. The primary purpose of this national highway is to provide connectivity to Haldia Port. Previously this route was numbered as National Highway 41.

== Route ==
Schematic map of National Highways in India

NH 116 connects Kolaghat, Mecheda, Tamluk, Nandakumar and Haldia port.

== Junctions ==
NH 16 Terminal near Kolaghat.
NH 116A near Radhamoni, Tamluk.
NH 116B near Nandakumar.

== Toll plaza ==
There is only 1 toll plaza on this highway at Sonapetya near Tamluk

== See also ==
- List of national highways in India
- National Highways Development Project
