= National Highway 57 (India) =

National highway in India

National Highway 57
- Map of National Highway 57 in red
- Schematic map of National Highways in India

Route information
- Length: 299 km (186 mi)

Major junctions
- West end: Balangir
- East end: Khordha

Location
- Country: India
- States: Odisha

Highway system
- Roads in India; Expressways; National; State; Asian
← NH 56	→ NH 58

National Highway 57 (NH 57), previously numbered as NH 224, is a primary National Highway in India connecting Balangir and Khurda in the state of Odisha.

== Route ==
NH57 links Balangir, Sonepur, Bauda, Dashapalla, Nayagarh and Khordha in the state of Odisha.

== Junctions ==
NH 26 Terminal near Balangir.
NH 126A near Subarnapur (Sonepur)
NH 153B near Bauda (Boudh)
NH 157 near Purunakatak
NH 157A near Madhapur
NH 16 Terminal near Khurda.

== See also ==
- List of national highways in India
- List of national highways in India by state
