= National Highway 126 (India) =

National Highway in India

National Highway 126
- Map of National Highway 126 in red

Route information
- Auxiliary route of NH 26
- Length: 23.6 km (14.7 mi)

Major junctions
- East end: Barapali
- West end: Sohela

Location
- Country: India
- States: Odisha

Highway system
- Roads in India; Expressways; National; State; Asian
← NH 26	→ NH 53

National Highway 126, commonly referred to as NH 126 is a national highway in India. It is a spur road of National Highway 26. NH-126 traverses the state of Odisha in India.

== Route ==
NH 126 connects Barapali, Dhaurakhanda, Panimora, Chichinda and Sohela.

== Junctions ==
NH 26 Terminal near Barapali.
NH 53 Terminal near Sohela.

== See also ==
- List of national highways in India
- List of national highways in India by state
