= Jeelugumilli =

- Village
- Interactive map of Jeelugumilli
- Location in Andhra Pradesh, India Jeelugumilli (India)
- Coordinates: 17°12′44″N 81°08′05″E
- Country: India
- State: Andhra Pradesh
- District: Eluru
- Elevation: 166 m (545 ft)

Population (2001)
  - Total: 4,043

Languages
  - Official: Telugu
- Time zone: UTC+5:30 (IST)
- PIN: 534456
- Vehicle registration: AP-37
- Nearest city: Eluru
- Lok Sabha constituency: Eluru
- Vidhan Sabha constituency: Polavaram

Jilugumilli or Jeelugu-milli is a village in Eluru district of the Indian state of Andhra Pradesh.

== Geography ==
Jilugumilli is located at 17.2121°N 81.1347°E. It has an average elevation of 166 metres (547 ft).

== Demographics ==
As of 2011 Census of India, Jeelugumilli had a population of 4043. The total population constitute, 1920 males and 2123 females with a sex ratio of 1106 females per 1000 males. 473 children are in the age group of 0–6 years, with sex ratio of 1075. The average literacy rate stands at 75.15%.
