= National Highway 116A (India) =

National Highway in India

National Highway 116A
- Map of National Highway 116A in red

Route information
- Auxiliary route of NH 16
- Length: 242 km (150 mi)

Major junctions
- South end: Kharagpur
- North end: Moregram

Location
- Country: India
- States: West Bengal

Highway system
- Roads in India; Expressways; National; State; Asian
← NH 16	→ NH 12

National Highway 116A, commonly referred to as NH 116A is a national highway in India. It is a secondary route of National Highway 16. NH-116A runs in the state of West Bengal in India.

== Route ==
NH116A connects Panskura (Mechogram), Daspur, Bandar, Gourhati, Arambagh, Uchalan, Sehara Bazar, Bardhaman, Karjana, Rampur, Mangalkot, Khargram, Nagar, Sherpur Panchgram and Moregram in the state of West Bengal.

== Junctions ==
NH 16 Terminal near Kharagpur.
NH 19 near Bardhaman
NH 12 Terminal near Moregram.

== See also ==
- List of national highways in India
- List of national highways in India by state
