= Purunakatak =

- Village
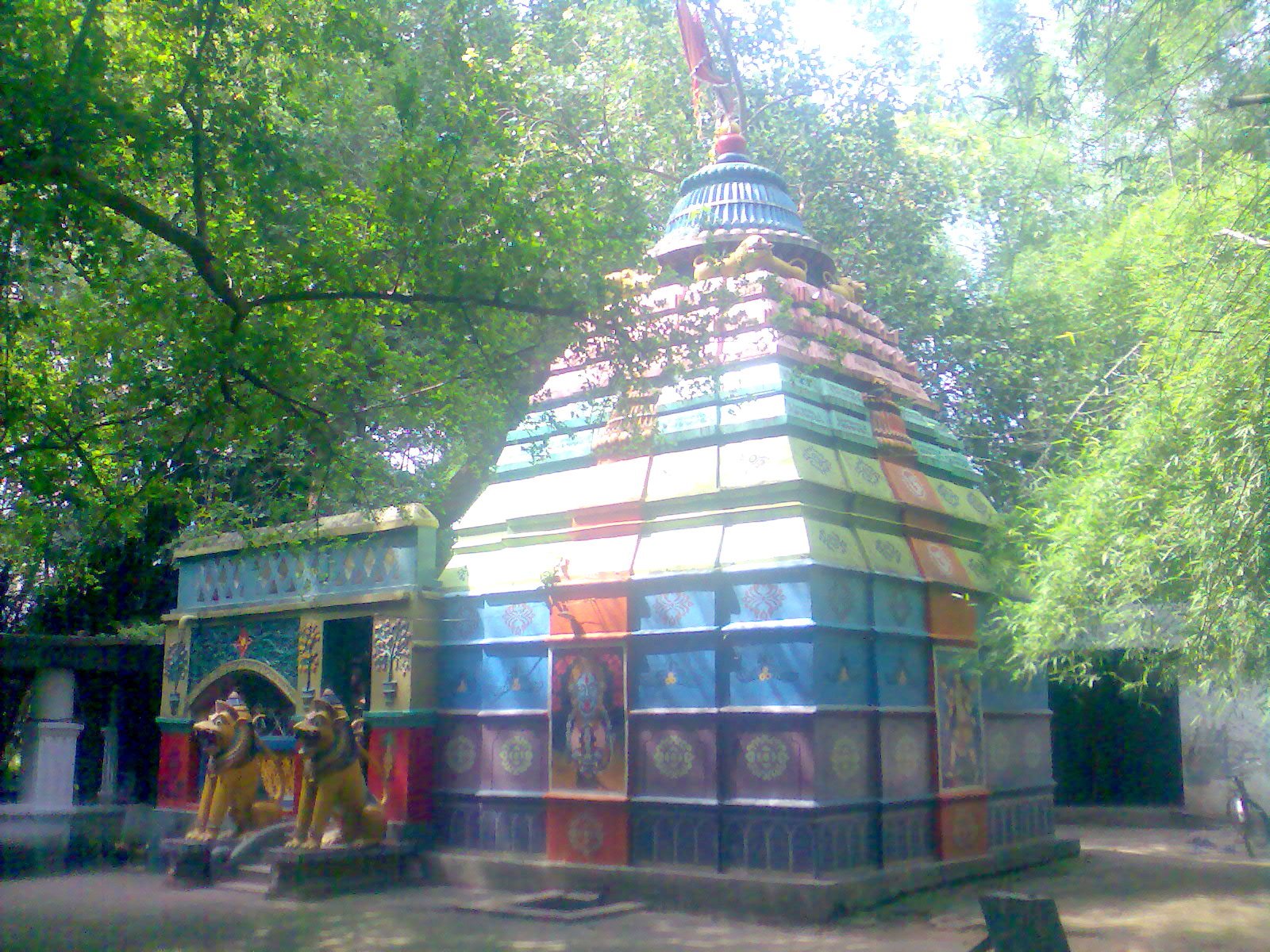
- Maa Bhairabi temple

- Location in Odisha, India Purunakatak (India)
- Coordinates: 20°38′0″N 84°26′0″E
- Country: India
- State: Odisha
- District: Boudh
- Elevation: 129 m (423 ft)

Languages
  - Official: Odia
- Time zone: UTC+5:30 (IST)
- Vehicle registration: OD 27
- Website: odisha.gov.in

Purunakatak is a large village and a semi-urban region in Boudh district, Odisha, India.

== Geography ==
It is located at 20°38′0″N 84°26′0″E at an elevation of 129 m above MSL.

== Location ==
NH-57 and NH-157 passes through Purunakatak.
