= Digha =

Seaside resort town in West Bengal, India

Digha দীঘা
- Seaside resort town
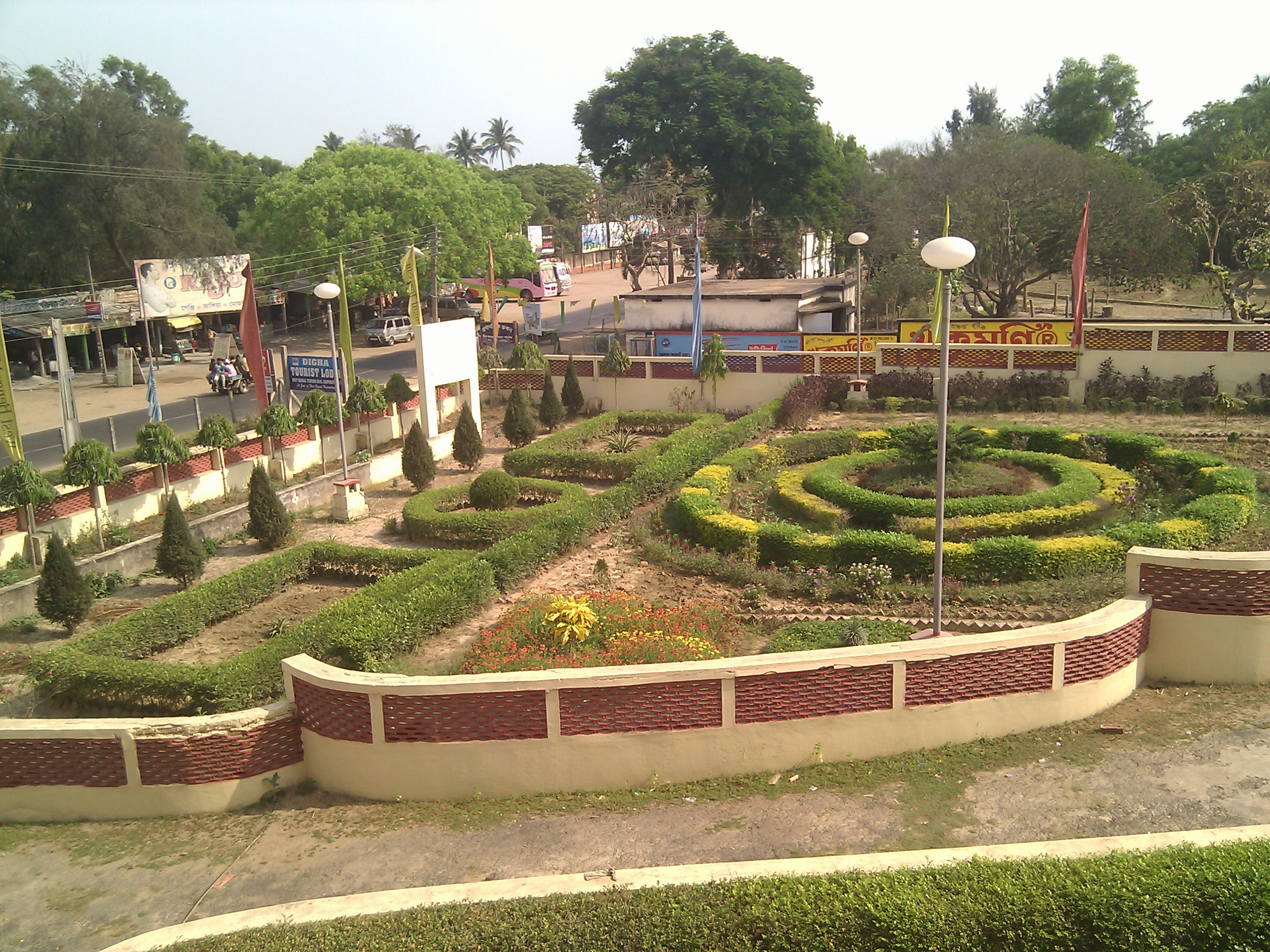
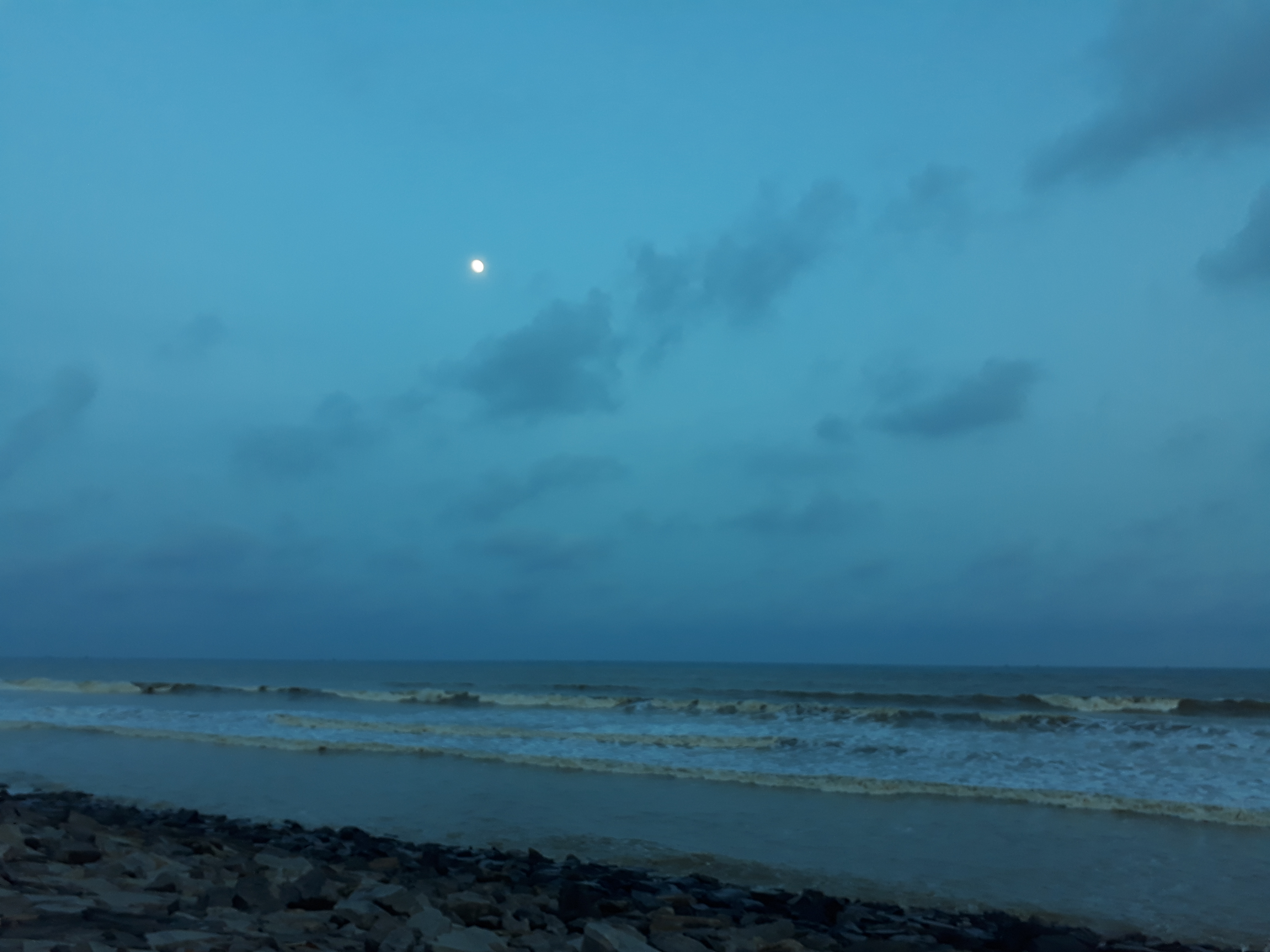
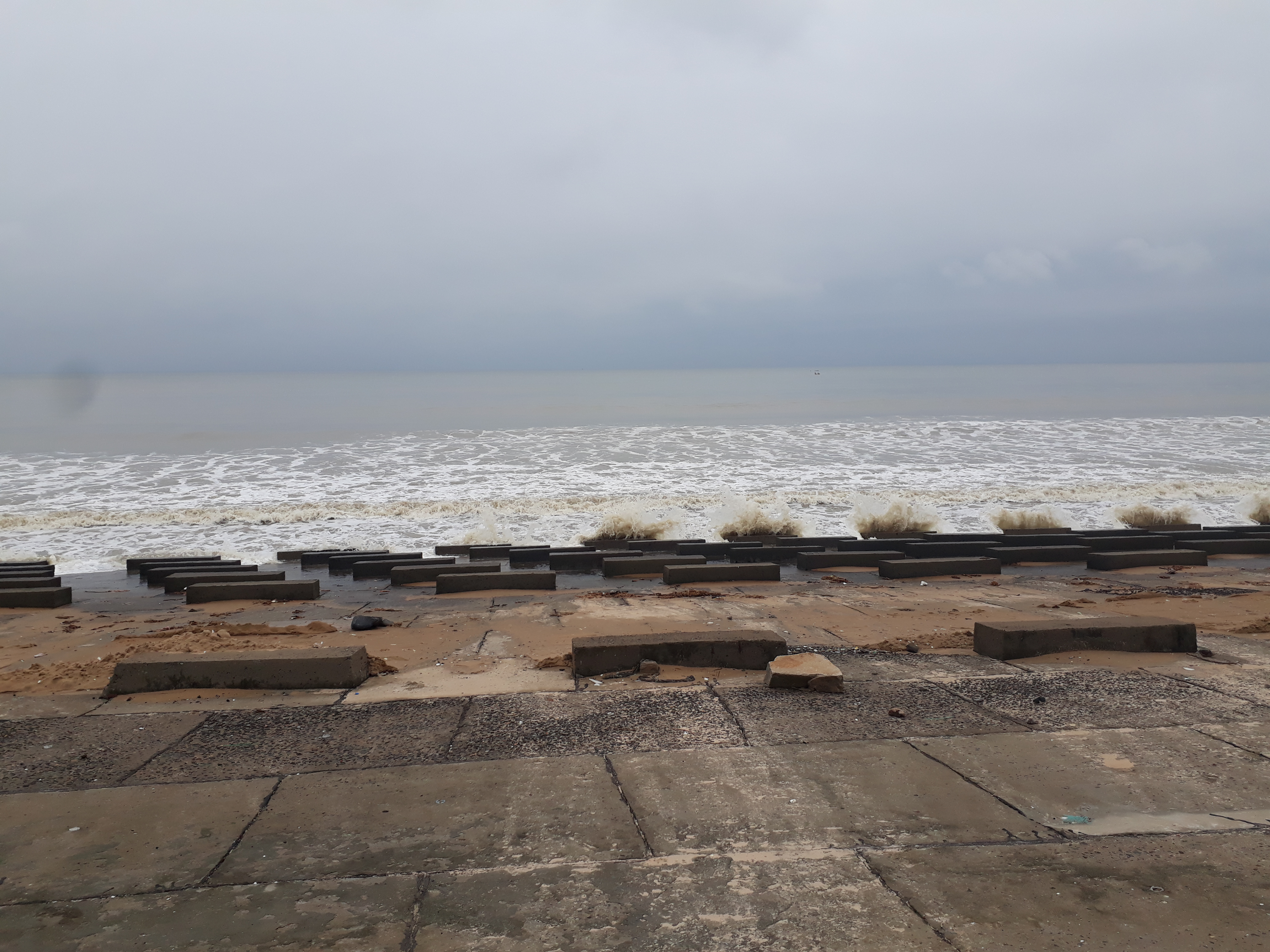
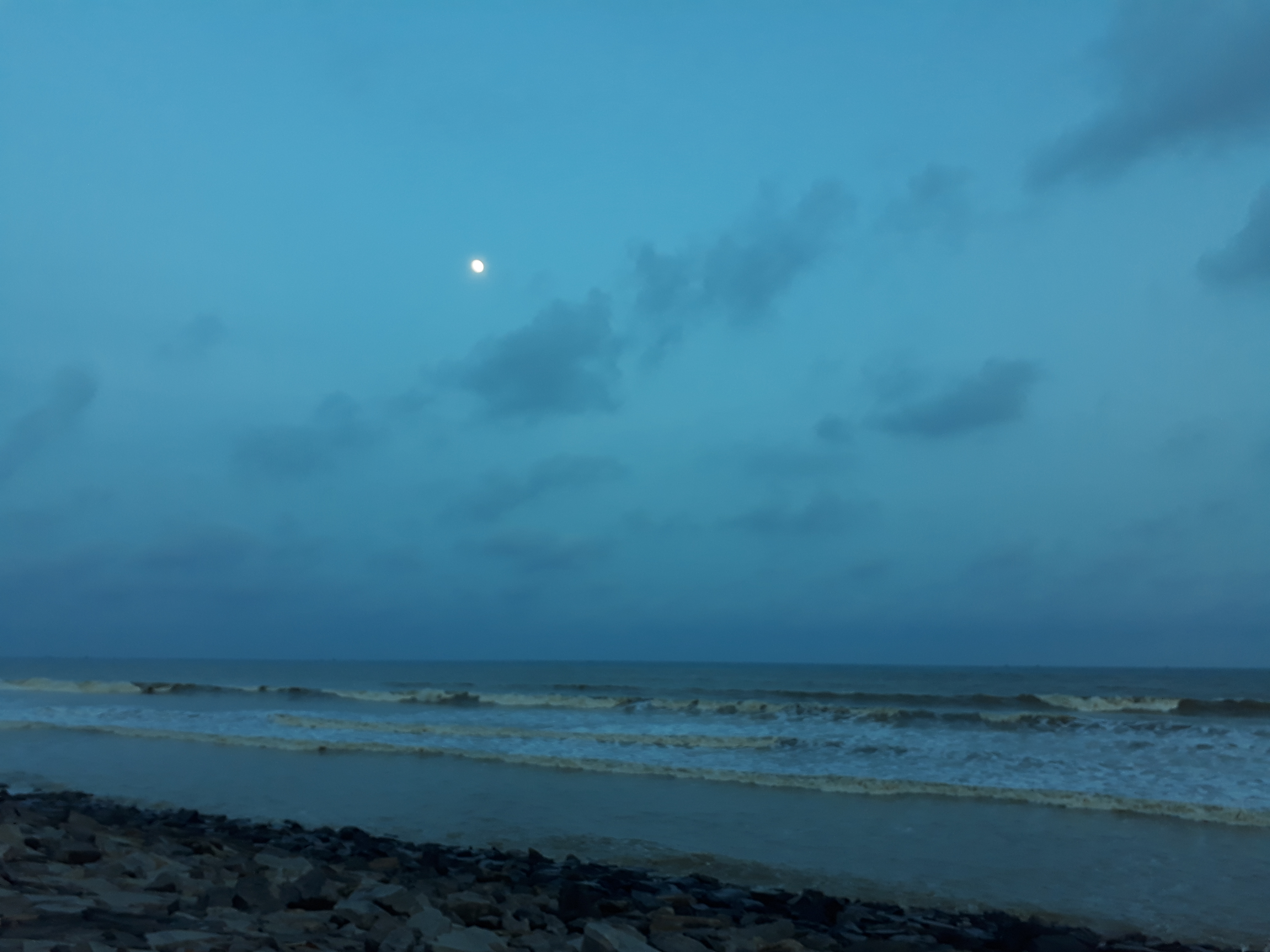
- Digha Tourist Lodge Digha Sea Beach Sunset at the beach Coastal view

- Location in West Bengal, India Digha (India)
- Coordinates: 21.6384°N 87.5096°E
- Country: India
- State: West Bengal
- District: Purba Medinipur
- Subdivision: Contai subdivision
- Development Authority: Digha Sankarpur Development Authority (DSDA)
- Elevation: 6 m (20 ft)

Languages
  - Official: Bengali
- Time zone: UTC+5:30 (IST)
- PIN: 721428
- Vehicle registration: WB-31xxxx, WB-32xxxx
- Lok Sabha constituency: Kanthi
- Vidhan Sabha constituency: Ramnagar
- Website: www.dsda.org.in • mydigha.in

Digha (Bengali pronunciation: [ˈdiɡʱa]) is a seaside resort town located in the Purba Medinipur district in the state of West Bengal, India. Situated at the northern end of the Bay of Bengal, it is a popular coastal tourist destination known for its low gradient and shallow sand beaches.

Referred to as the "Brighton of the East" by Warren Hastings in one of his 1780 letters to his wife, Digha has remained a favored holiday spot for decades. It is West Bengal's most visited sea resort, with beaches that stretch over 7 km.

== History ==
Digha was historically known as Beerkul.It was discovered in the late 18th century by the British.

English businessman John Frank Smith started living in Digha in 1923, with his writings providing exposure to the town, culminating in him convincing West Bengal Chief Minister Bidhan Chandra Roy to develop it into a beach resort.

An old church can be seen near the main gate of Old Digha, known as Alankarpur.

Beside Amrabati Park, a new mission has been developed in New Digha known as Sindhur Tara, a church allowing visitors to wish for the welfare of family and loved ones.

== Geography ==
Cities and towns in Contai subdivision of Purba Medinipur district
M: municipal city/ town, CT: census town, R: rural/ urban centre, H: historical/ religious centre, S: port, sea-beach
Owing to space constraints in the small map, the actual locations in a larger map may vary slightly

=== Location ===
Digha is located at 21°38′18″N 87°30′35″E. It has an average elevation of 6 metres (20 ft).

It is 183 km (114 mi) from Kolkata/Howrah via Mecheda and 234 km (145 mi) via Kharagpur. This proximity gave way for Digha to emerge as a popular destination spot, with a number of hotels clustering around its main road.

Digha is connected to Kolkata/Howrah by a highway and a rail-link via Tamluk. Many trains including Howrah-Digha Super AC express, Tamralipta express, Kandari express and EMU locals from Santragacchi via Mecheda and Tamluk run between Digha and Howarh and other stations in eastern India. It is under the Contai Sub division.

=== Police stations ===
Digha police station has jurisdiction over part of Ramnagar I (part) CD Block. It covers an area of 3,153 km^{2} with a population of 35,054. It is in old Digha. Digha Mohana Coastal police station is in Digha.

=== Urbanisation ===
93.55% of the population of Contai subdivision live in the rural areas. Only 6.45% of the population live in the urban areas and it is considerably behind Haldia subdivision in urbanization, where 20.81% of the population live in urban areas.

Note: The map alongside presents some of the notable locations in the subdivision. All places marked in the map are linked in the larger full screen map.

== Hospital ==
There is a District Hospital near old Digha. There is Contai Sub divisional Hospital and Sanjiban Hospital 31 km from Digha.

== Climate ==
There are mainly five seasons in Digha, namely summer, monsoon, autumn, winter and spring. Summer starts in April and continues until June with a maximum temperature of 37 °C (99 °F), though cold wind from the sea keeps the weather generally pleasant in this time. Monsoon arrives in July and lasts till the end of September. Digha generally experiences an average rainfall with high humidity in the monsoon season. Autumn sets in during October and lasts until mid December, with an average temperature of around 25 degree Celsius. Winter begins in the second half of December and lasts till mid February with an average temperature of 15-16 degree Celsius. The spring season in Digha goes from mid February to mid April. Tourist inflow peaks during this season.

Climate data for Digha (1991–2020, extremes 1982–2020)
Month	Jan	Feb	Mar	Apr	May	Jun	Jul	Aug	Sep	Oct	Nov	Dec	Year
Record high °C (°F)	32.9 (91.2)	36.0 (96.8)	38.0 (100.4)	41.3 (106.3)	42.0 (107.6)	39.0 (102.2)	37.3 (99.1)	36.6 (97.9)	37.1 (98.8)	38.2 (100.8)	34.5 (94.1)	32.5 (90.5)	42.0 (107.6)
Mean daily maximum °C (°F)	25.6 (78.1)	28.2 (82.8)	31.3 (88.3)	32.7 (90.9)	33.5 (92.3)	33.1 (91.6)	32.0 (89.6)	31.8 (89.2)	32.1 (89.8)	31.8 (89.2)	29.6 (85.3)	26.9 (80.4)	30.7 (87.3)
Mean daily minimum °C (°F)	13.9 (57.0)	18.1 (64.6)	22.9 (73.2)	25.7 (78.3)	26.7 (80.1)	27.1 (80.8)	26.7 (80.1)	26.5 (79.7)	26.2 (79.2)	23.9 (75.0)	19.1 (66.4)	14.5 (58.1)	22.6 (72.7)
Record low °C (°F)	7.4 (45.3)	8.8 (47.8)	12.6 (54.7)	17.9 (64.2)	18.3 (64.9)	20.8 (69.4)	20.4 (68.7)	21.4 (70.5)	21.0 (69.8)	15.8 (60.4)	9.8 (49.6)	8.4 (47.1)	7.4 (45.3)
Average rainfall mm (inches)	15.8 (0.62)	20.4 (0.80)	27.8 (1.09)	52.7 (2.07)	153.9 (6.06)	279.9 (11.02)	276.1 (10.87)	329.9 (12.99)	331.9 (13.07)	222.7 (8.77)	42.5 (1.67)	6.0 (0.24)	1,759.6 (69.28)
Average rainy days	1.1	1.3	1.8	3.5	6.2	10.2	13.7	14.1	12.1	7.5	1.8	0.6	73.9
Average relative humidity (%) (at 17:30 IST)	70	72	73	78	79	81	83	83	81	78	73	70	77
Source: India Meteorological Department

== Transport ==
=== Bus service ===
There is frequent bus service to Digha from Dharmatala, Baruipur Garia and Joka bus stand of Kolkata, Burdwan, Bolpur, Siliguri, Asansol, Kirnahar, Baharampur, Serampore, Tarakeswar and many other parts of West Bengal. Buses are available from Howrah as well, a connection has been made from Sealdah to Digha where a private bus arrives at 8:30 am throughout the week. It takes the shortest route from Sealdah connecting S.N Banerjee road, Taltala, Wellington, Dharmatala to Howrah station, it departs from Howrah Station within 5 min to Digha. Digha is connected to Kolkata Metropolitan Area with E17 (Barasat), E17/1 (Barasat), E19 (Habra), E19D (Dumdum station), E45 (Joka), E46 (Saltlake Karunamoyee), E54 (Sreerampore), E55 (Madhyamgram), E56 (Baduria), ACT5 (Barasat), ACT8 (Habra), ACT9 (Saltlake Karunamoyee), ST31 (Dharmatala) etc.

=== Train service ===
In 2004, train services have started for Digha railway station (Station Code : DGHA). Now there are three new trains from Howrah Station too.

Train Name	Start <-> Destination
Tamralipta Express	HWH <-> DGHA
Paharia Express	NJP <-> DGHA
Vishakapatnam - Digha SF Express	VSKP <-> DGHA
Kandari Express	HWH <-> DGHA
Malda Town - Digha Express	MLDT <-> DGHA
Asansol - Digha Express	ASN <-> DGHA
Puri Digha Superfast Express	Puri <-> DGHA
Mecheda Local	MCA <-> DGHA
Panskura Local	PKU <-> DGHA

=== Air ===
- Digha Heliport

== Area ==
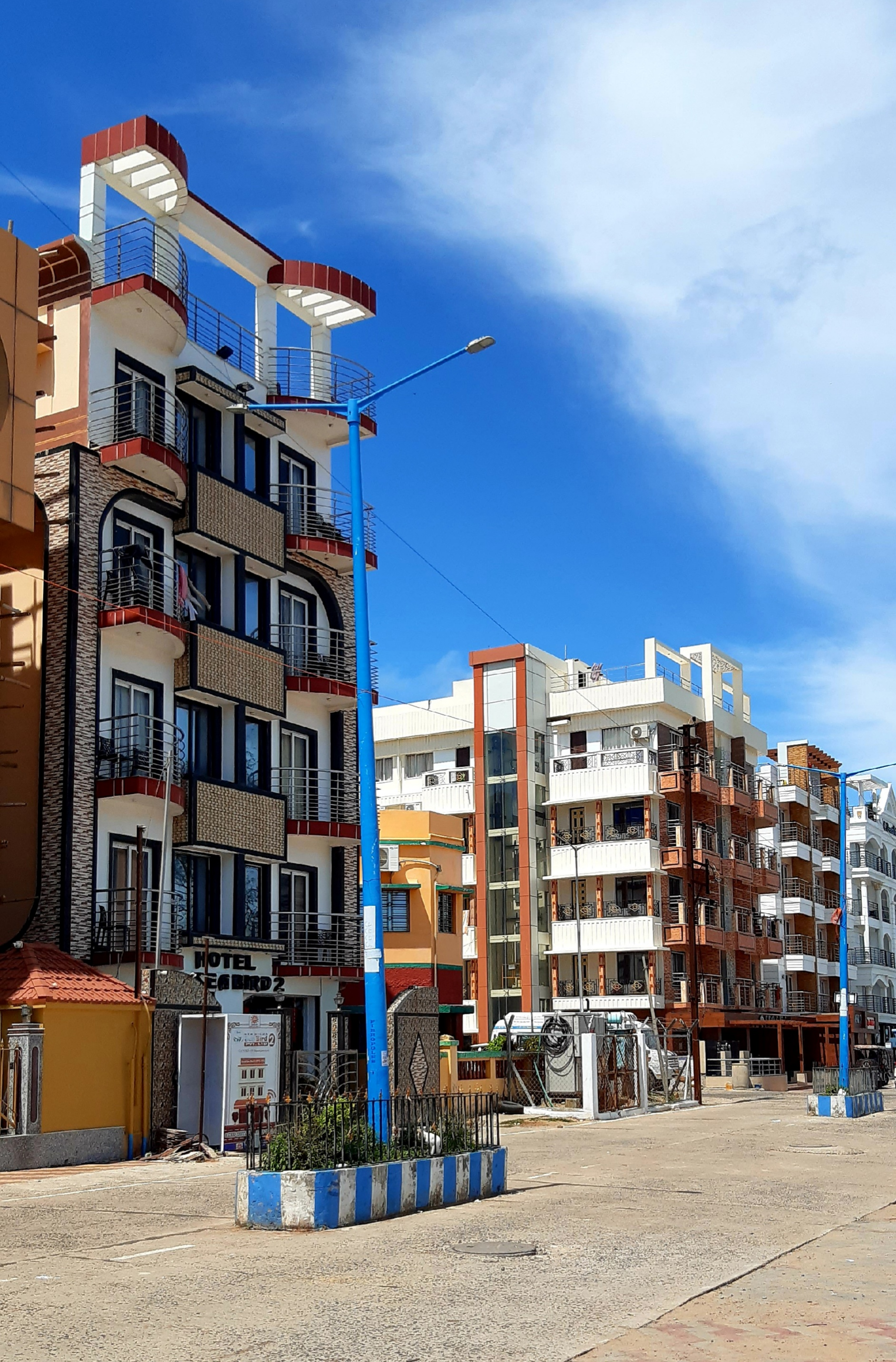
Hotels at Talasari, New Digha Road, Gadadharpur, Purba Medinipur.

Digha's old beach has shrunk overtime due to heavy soil erosion. Big stones and concrete steps are used to hold together the beach. The record number of storm surges have caused many shacks and smaller hotels to succumb to the sea. Since it is one of very few popular beaches in West Bengal, it gets overcrowded, especially during the cooler winter season.

A new, larger beach has been developed, known as "New Digha," is about 2 km (1.2 mi) from the old beach. The latest attraction of New Digha is the Science Centre established by the National Council of Science Museums. The entire stretch of the Digha seaface from Old Digha to New Digha is filled with casuarina plantations.

== Places of interest ==
=== Marine Aquarium and Research Centre (MARC) ===
It was established in the year 1989 during the Seventh Five Year Plan. The major objective of the Centre is to display the marine biodiversity of the region and impart its values to the common people and to carryout the research activities.

=== Jagannath Temple, Digha ===
The Jagannath Temple, Digha is a Hindu temple dedicated to Lord Jagannath, located in the coastal town of Digha, Purba Medinipur district, West Bengal. The temple enshrines the deities Jagannath, a form of Vishnu, along with his siblings Balabhadra and Subhadra. The temple was inaugurated on 30 April 2025, after a prana pratishtha (consecration) ceremony.

The temple is sacred to the Vaishnava tradition of Hindus and has been constructed as a replica of the famous Jagannath Temple in Puri, Odisha.

Jagannath, Balabhadra and Subhadra, along with Sudarshan, will be worshipped as deities in the temple.

=== Shiva Temple At Chandaneswar ===
This place is only 8 km (5.0 mi) away from Digha the century-old Temple of Shiva at Chandaneswar, near Bengal and Orissa Border. Chandaneswar is part of Odisha. During the Bengali month of Chaitra, an annual fair is organised here. Nearly half million people and pilgrims visit the temple.

=== Digha Gate ===
Digha Gate is an entrance gate built on the National Highway 116B. The gate is also known as the Gateway of Digha and the Digha Welcome Gate. It is shaped like a fishing boat and painted blue and white. The gate is illuminated at night.
