= Thallada =

Coordinates: 17°15′37″N 80°28′43″E

Tallada తల్లాడ
- Mandal
- Interactive map of Tallada
- Country: India
- State: Telangana
- District: Khammam

Languages
  - Official: Telugu
- Time zone: UTC+5:30 (IST)
- PIN: 507167
- Telephone code: 08749
- Vehicle registration: TS 04
- Nearest city: Wyra
- Lok Sabha constituency: Khammam
- Vidhan Sabha constituency: Sathupalli
- Climate: hot (Köppen)
- Website: telangana.gov.in

Thallada (Thiladri) is a mandal in Khammam district of Telangana, India and falls under Kalluru revenue division.

== Demographics ==
According to Indian census, 2001, the demographic details of Tallada mandal is as follows:

- Total Population: 54,266 in 12,691 Households.
- Male Population: 27,698 and Female Population: 26,568
- Children Under 6-years of age: 7,007 (Boys - 3,513 and Girls - 3,494)
- Tallada well known for sandhi vaidyam
- Total Literates: 26,024

== Villages ==
The villages in Thallada mandal include:

- Narayanapuram
- Annarugudem
- Balapate
- Basavapuram
- Billupadu
- Gollagudem
- Gopalapeta
- Kalakodima
- Kesavapuram
- Kodavatimetta
- Reddigudem
- Kotha Venkatagiri
- Kurnavalli
- Laxmipuram
- Mallaram
- Mittapalli
- Muddunuru
- Nuthankal
- Malsoor Thanda
- Pinapaka
- Ramanujavaram
- Rangam Banjar
- Rejerla
- Telagavaram
- Venkatapuram
- Anjanapuram
- Thallada
- Muvva Guduru, Vengannapet
- Ramachandrapuram)Venkatagiri,
