= Borigumma =

- NAC
- Location in Odisha, India Borigumma (India)
- Coordinates: 19°2′52″N 82°33′13″E
- Country: India
- State: Odisha
- District: Koraput
- Elevation: 588 m (1,929 ft)

Languages
  - Official: Odia
- Time zone: UTC+5:30 (IST)
- PIN: 764056
- Telephone code: 06860
- Vehicle registration: OD-10
- Coastline: 0 kilometres (0 mi)
- Nearest city: Jeypore
- Climate: Aw (Köppen)
- Website: odisha.gov.in

Borigumma is a town in Koraput district of Odisha state of India. It is located strategically between 3 of the major towns of undivided Koraput district - Jeypore, Nabarangpur and Kotpad and because of its location advantage as National Highway 26 and National Highway 201 passes through it, it is also known for its business activities.Borigumma has recently been declared as a Notified Area Council (NAC), reflecting its growing urban importance and administrative development in the Koraput district of Odisha.

== History ==
According to some locals, the name Borigumma is derived from two local words "Bori" means Indian jujube fruit (boro koli) and "Gumma" means high land. According to local old people there used to be a tall Boro Koli tree (Indian jujube tree) in the center of town.

The Bhairab Temple at Bhairabsingpur village of Borigumma is a protected monument and it is considered to be hundreds of years old.
