= Chandaneswar Temple =

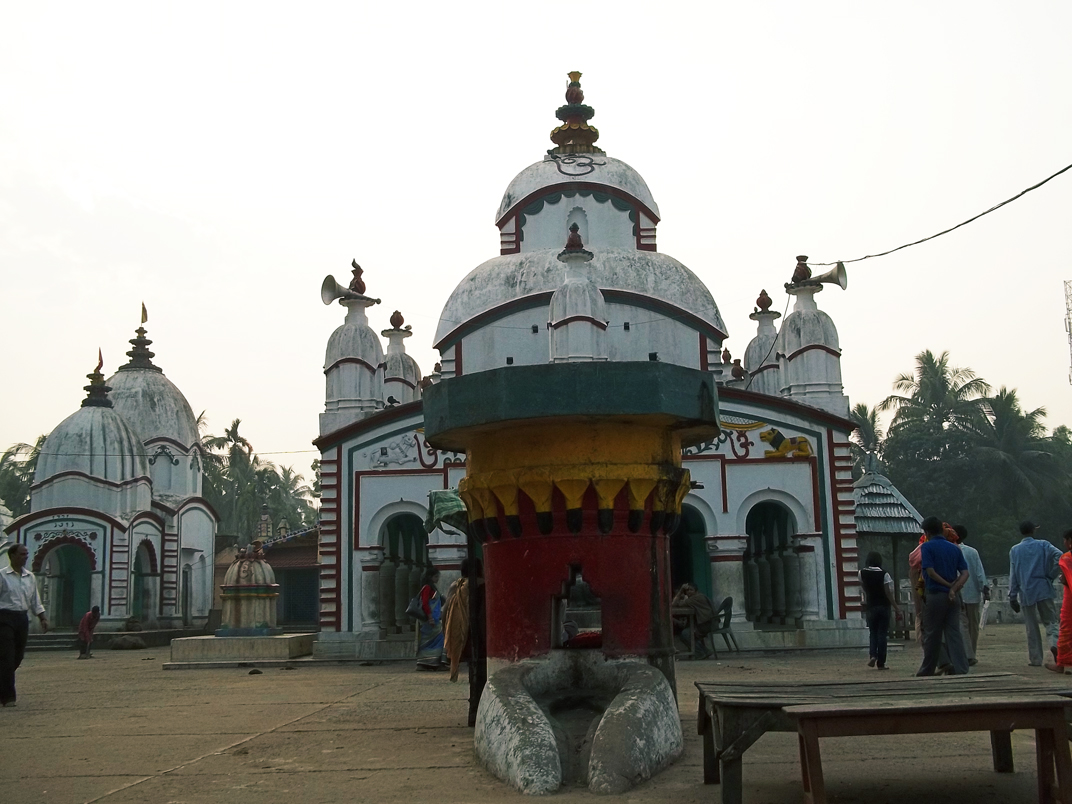

- Location in Odisha

Religion
- Affiliation: Hinduism
- District: Baleswar
- Deity: Shiva

Location
- State: Odisha
- Country: India
- Interactive map of Chandaneswar Temple
- Coordinates: 21°37′42″N 87°27′28″E

Architecture
- Type: Kalinga Architecture

Chandaneswar Temple is a famous Shiva temple located in Chandaneswar, Baleswar district of Odisha, India. A huge annual fair on the Pana Sankranti (Odia Hindu solar New Year), the first day of the Odia calendar, is celebrated on the premises. Many Indian pilgrims visit the temple during this period.

== Location ==
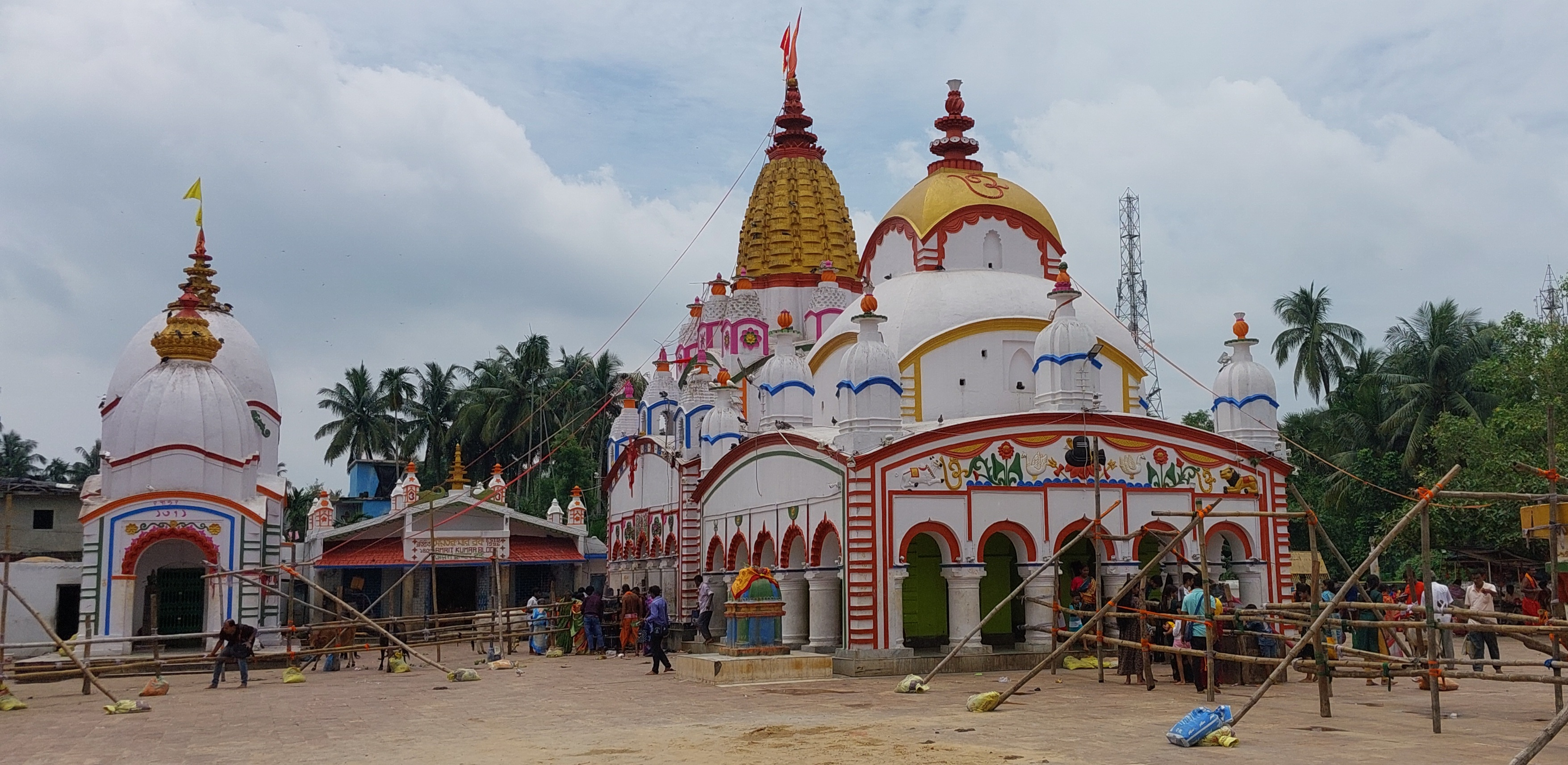
Chandaneswar Temple complex

Chandaneshwar is in Balasore district of Odisha. Regular transport is available from Jaleswar in Odisha and Digha in West Bengal.

== Maha Bishuba Sankranti ==
The Odia new year Maha Bishuba Sankranti day is famous around the premises of the shrine. Locally called Uda Parba, Nila Parba after worshiping Nilakanth Shiva, Chadaka Yatra. Half a million people gather around the shrine and fast for several days to fulfill their wishes. It was built in typical Kalinga Architecture style of Old Odisha temples.

Chandaneswar is famous for Chandaneswar temple of Lord Siva Every year in the month of 'Chaitra' (from 14 March to 14 April) an Odisha famous "Chadak Mela/Chaitra Mela/Udaa". It continues for 13 days (13 Arghya to 1 Arghya discounting). The Bhaktas (devotees) accept paita (pabitrata). The Bhaktas with their 'manaskamana' come from all over the country. From last 5th Arghya to 3rd Arghya the Bhaktas increase in numbers. Near about 3 to 4 lakh of Bhaktas offer their Arghyas (prayer) at night only.

They fast the whole day not even swallowing their spit. Last 4th Arghya day "Kamina Baha" (marriage of Lord Siva with Kamina, daughter of demon Nila), second Arghyaday "Nila Parba" and the first Arghya day "Paata Parbha (Mala Chandani). As per the rigorous manasik point of view some Bhaktas prick their bodies and tongues with iron nails. The whole gathering is controlled by the Paata Bhakta and Odisha Government. After the Paata Parba the Bhaktas remove their Paitas after their last Arghya and float in the sea but the fair continues another seven or eight days more.

== See also ==
- Chandipur
