= National Highway 116B (India) =

National highway in India

National Highway 116B
- Map of the National Highway in red
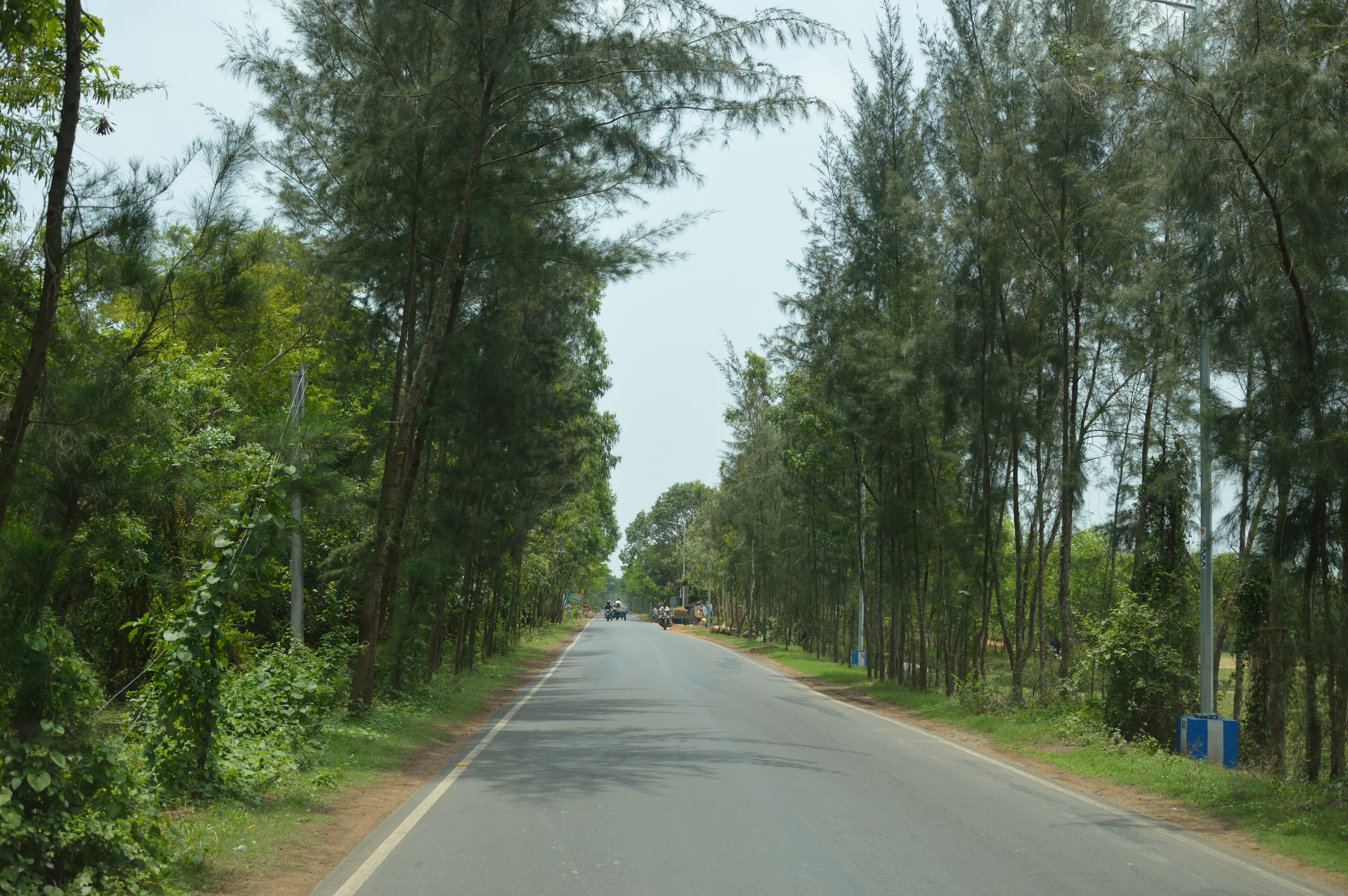
- Contai - Digha highway 2015

Route information
- Length: 91 km (57 mi)

Major junctions
- From: Nandakumar
- To: Chandaneswar

Location
- Country: India
- States: West Bengal: 91 km (57 mi)

Highway system
- Roads in India; Expressways; National; State; Asian

National Highway 116B (NH 116B) starts from Nandakumar, Purba Medinipur district (junction with NH 116) in West Bengal and ends at Chandaneswar, Balasore district in Odisha. The highway is 91 km (57 mi) long. The road passes through Contai and Digha.

== See also ==
- List of national highways in India
- National Highways Development Project
