= Devarapalle, East Godavari district =

Devarapalle
- Mandal
- Interactive map of Devarapalle
- Location in Andhra Pradesh, India
- Coordinates: 17°1′55.77″N 81°33′16.873″E
- Country: India
- State: Andhra Pradesh
- District: East Godavari

Population (2011)
  - Total: 14,796

Languages
  - Official: Telugu
- Time zone: UTC+5:30 (IST)
- PIN: 534313
- Telephone code: 08813
- ISO 3166 code: IN-WB
- Vehicle registration: AP 39,40

Devarapalle is a village in East Godavari district in the state of Andhra Pradesh in India. It is located in Devarapalli mandal in Kovvur revenue division and Gopalapuram Assembly Constituency

== Demographics ==
As of 2011 Census of India, Devarapalli had a population of 14796. The total population constitute, 7399 males and 7397 females with a sex ratio of 1000 females per 1000 males. 1546 children are in the age group of 0–6 years, with sex ratio of 1000. The average literacy rate stands at 71.65%.
