= Phulbani =

- Town
- Location in Odisha, India Phulbani (India)
- Coordinates: 20.47°N 84.23°E
- Country: India
- State: Odisha
- District: Kandhamal

Government
  - Type: Municipality
  - Body: Phulbani Municipality
- Elevation: 485 m (1,591 ft)

Population (2011)
  - Total: 37,371

Languages
  - Official: Odia
  - Spoken: Phulbani Odia, Kui
- Time zone: UTC+5:30 (IST)
- PIN: 762 001 & 762002
- Telephone code: 06842
- Vehicle registration: OD-12
- Website: phulbanimunicipality.nic.in

Phulbani is a municipality and administrative headquarters of Kandhamal district in the state of Odisha in India.

== Geography ==
Phulbani is located at 20.47°N 84.23°E. It has an average elevation of 485 metres (1591 feet).

It is located 211 km from Bhubaneshwar, the capital of Odisha and 165 km from Berhampur, the major city of South Odisha. Nearest railway station is Purunakatak around 40 km from here. The region around Phulbani has a variety of flora and fauna. It is a place surrounded by hills and has a lot of small and big waterfalls around it. Katramal Waterfall, the most spectacular of the lot is situated at a distance of about 31 km from Phulbani. Putudi Waterfall, a hot spot among the local people is situated at a distance of about 18 km from Phulbani. Pakdajhar waterfall is situated at a distance of about 3–5 km from Sudrukumpa, a small village which is situated about 19 km from the main city of Phulbani. Last but not the least, there is Urmagarh waterfall, which is close to 21 km from Phulbani. Phulbani is surrounded by River Salunki.

== Climate ==
Climate data for Phulbani (1991–2020, extremes 1959–2020)
Month	Jan	Feb	Mar	Apr	May	Jun	Jul	Aug	Sep	Oct	Nov	Dec	Year
Record high °C (°F)	34.4 (93.9)	37.4 (99.3)	40.4 (104.7)	44.0 (111.2)	44.6 (112.3)	44.0 (111.2)	42.0 (107.6)	35.5 (95.9)	36.5 (97.7)	35.4 (95.7)	33.9 (93.0)	31.6 (88.9)	44.6 (112.3)
Mean daily maximum °C (°F)	26.8 (80.2)	30.5 (86.9)	34.8 (94.6)	37.6 (99.7)	38.4 (101.1)	33.0 (91.4)	29.0 (84.2)	28.2 (82.8)	29.5 (85.1)	29.0 (84.2)	27.0 (80.6)	25.4 (77.7)	30.8 (87.4)
Mean daily minimum °C (°F)	8.9 (48.0)	11.6 (52.9)	14.8 (58.6)	19.6 (67.3)	22.4 (72.3)	22.0 (71.6)	20.5 (68.9)	19.9 (67.8)	19.6 (67.3)	17.1 (62.8)	12.6 (54.7)	8.6 (47.5)	16.6 (61.9)
Record low °C (°F)	−2.3 (27.9)	0.4 (32.7)	5.4 (41.7)	7.7 (45.9)	9.0 (48.2)	12.2 (54.0)	10.6 (51.1)	9.5 (49.1)	7.0 (44.6)	2.5 (36.5)	1.2 (34.2)	−0.6 (30.9)	−2.3 (27.9)
Average rainfall mm (inches)	17.0 (0.67)	14.4 (0.57)	17.0 (0.67)	39.4 (1.55)	59.0 (2.32)	186.7 (7.35)	364.9 (14.37)	330.0 (12.99)	232.8 (9.17)	108.1 (4.26)	12.7 (0.50)	8.8 (0.35)	1,390.8 (54.76)
Average rainy days	1.1	1.3	1.4	2.8	3.9	9.6	14.3	14.9	12.2	5.8	1.0	0.6	68.8
Average relative humidity (%) (at 17:30 IST)	64	54	47	42	47	68	85	87	85	80	73	68	67
Source: India Meteorological Department

== Demographics ==
As of 2011 India census, Phulbani had a population of 37,371, with 53% males and 47% females. Phulbani has an average literacy rate of 76%, marginally higher than the national average of 74.5%: male literacy is 83%, and female literacy is 68%. In Phulbani, 12% of the population is under 6 years of age.

== Overview ==
Phulbani once associated with its virgin forests and peaceful tribal people.

Major landmarks in Phulbani are Jagannath Temple, Madikunda Chaka, Govt. College, FCI, Stadium, Govt. Hospital (Medical), Collecterate office and Gopabandhu field (Coronation ground) for hosting annual events. Phulbani also has a Barrack for Odisha Reserve Police near river salunki. In 2012 there was a speculation of phulbani town name being changed to Boudh-kandhamal and that was even confirmed by district administrative magistrate. This created a feeling of resentment among the phulbani peoples. Although it is claimed that name of Phulbani was changed to ‘Boudh-Kandhamal' according to public demand, residents of Kandhamal district say they are ignorant about this demand and do not know who made this demand. Even reports were out, of peoples planning to throw huge protests if name was to be changed.

== Economy ==
Phulbani also has a Farm for research activities of Odisha horticulture and research on silk moths. The farm hosts a varied collection of Guava Plants found rarely elsewhere. It is famous for the production of good quality turmeric.

River Pila Salunki is heart of this regions agriculture, but due to lack of water this region has never been a success with agriculture. Mostly the economy is centered on wild plants and herbs. In the last major flood was in 1981. The dam a pilasalunki has been successful in arresting sudden gauss of rain water in rainy season. The dam at pilasalunki is also a great place for picnics.

== Education ==
The town has a Government college for intermediate, under graduate and post graduate studies. Some of the well known schools AJO High School (Estd.: 1904), Govt. Girls High School, Police High School, Sri Satya Sai High School, Public School (English Medium), Kendriya Vidyalaya, Carmel English Medium School, Saraswati Shishu Vidya Mandira and Sri Aurobindo Integral Education & Research Centre. Carmel school is founded by Carmelite sisters of Kerala. Phulbani's oldest school AJO (Alfred James Olenbatch) High school was a jail for central Odisha region during the British rule and was converted to a school soon after India got independent. Recently, Kendriya Vidyalaya has availed the full-fledged building of its own made near Narayani temple and has facility for accommodating 12 standard students as well. The results of Kendriya Vidyalaya, Kandhamal in recent standard 10th & 12th exam has set up new bench mark with students securing good marks.

Technical Institutions Available:-

1. Govt. I.T.I, Phulnbani

Intake Capacity of Courses

Sl. No	Trade	No. of Units	Duration(in Years)
1	Fitter	2	2
2	Electrician	2	2
3	Electronics/ Mechanic	2	2
4	M.M.V	2	2
5	D.M.C	1	2
6	D.M.M	1	2
7	Wireman	2	1
8	Welder	2	1

2. Govt. Polytechnic, Phulabani (http://gpkandhamal.pe.hu/)

Intake Capacity of Courses

Sl. No	Trade	No. of Students
1	Civil Engineering	120
2	Electrical Engineering	60
3	Mechanical Engineering	60

3. Biju Patnaik Institute of Technology (BPIT), Phulbani (http://www.bpitphulbani.ac.in/)

Intake Capacity of Courses

Sl. No	Discipline	Strength
1	Civil Engineering	60
2	Electrical Engineering	60
3	Electronics & Tele-Comm. Engineering	90
4	Mechanical Engineering	90
5	Computer Science & Engineering	60

== Politics ==
Phulbani is part of Kandhamal (Lok Sabha constituency).

Current MLA from Phulbani (ST) Assembly Constituency is Sri. Angad Kanhar of BJD, who won the seat in State elections in 2019. Other previous MLAs from this seat were Mr. Debendra Kanhar in 2009 Mr. Padmanabha Behera in 1990 and 2004, Bishnu Priya Behera who won this seat representing BJD in 2000, independent candidate Dasarathi Behera in 1995, Abhimanyu Behera of INC in 1985, Chandra Sekhar Behera of INC(I) in 1980 and Prahallad Behera of JNP in 1977.
