= Addateegala =

- village
- Interactive map of Addateegala
- Location in Andhra Pradesh, India Addateegala (India)
- Coordinates: 17.4833°N 82.0167°E
- Country: India
- State: Andhra Pradesh
- District: Polavaram
- Talukas: Addateegala
- Elevation: 183 m (600 ft)

Languages
  - Official: Telugu
- Time zone: UTC+5:30 (IST)
- Vehicle Registration: AP05 (Former); AP39 (from 30 January 2019)

Addateegala is a village and the mandal headquarters of the Addateegala mandal in Polavaram district in the state of Andhra Pradesh in India. Alluri Sitarama Raju has famously attacked the police station in Addateegala on 15 October 1922 as part of the Rampa Rebellion of 1922. The government celebrated 100 years of the rebellion at the Addateegala police station in 2022 and promised to develop it for tourism.

== Geography ==
Addatigala is located at 17.4833°N 82.0167°E. It has an average elevation of 183 meters (603 feet).

== Demographics ==
As of Census 2011, Addateegala has population of 6002 of which 3021 were males while 2981 were females, sex ratio is 987. The population of children (aged 0–6) was 494, which makes up 8.23% of total population of village. Literacy rate of the village was 84.26%.

== Gallery ==
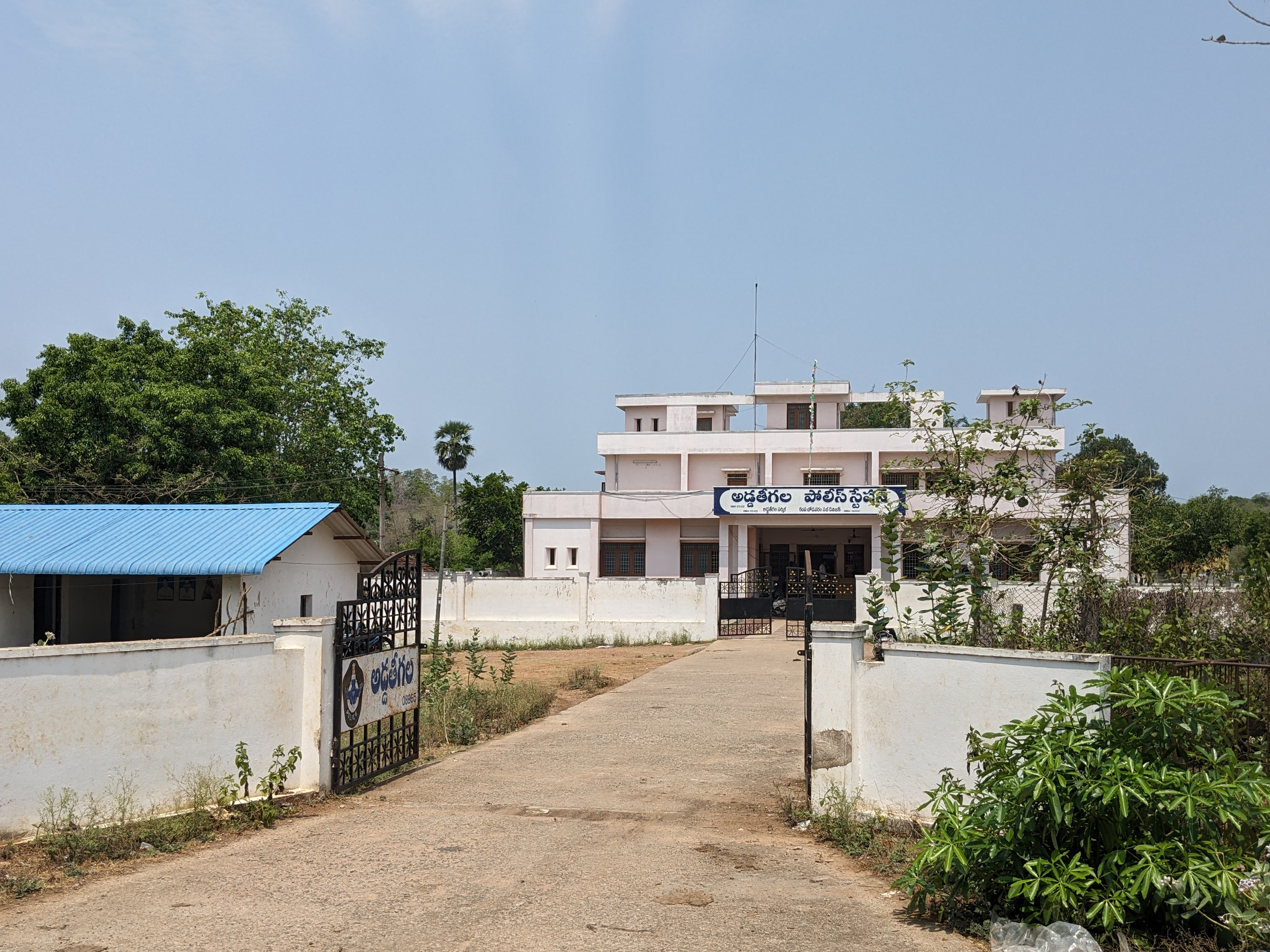
New Addateegala Police Station

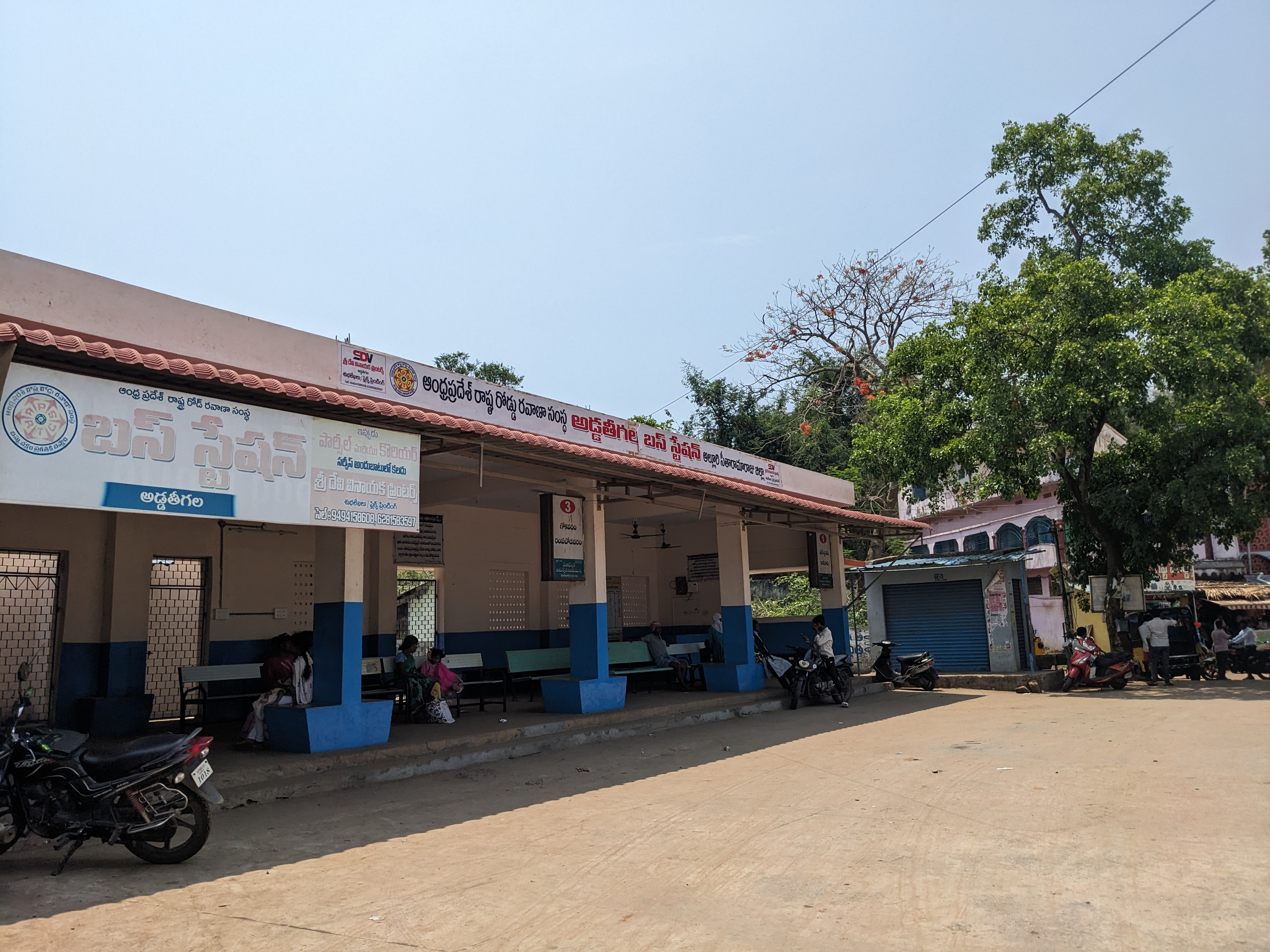
APSRTC Bus station in Addateegala

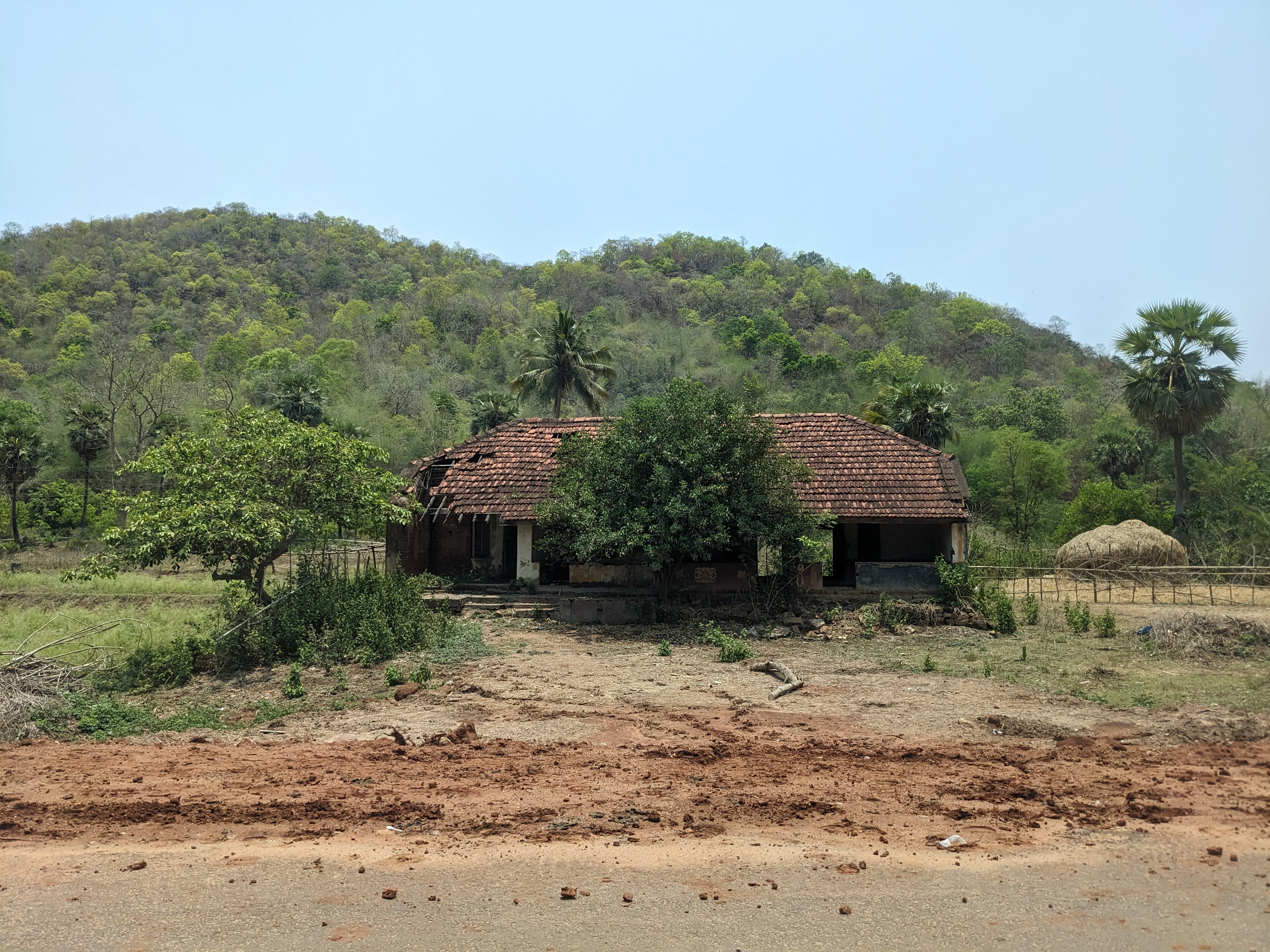
An abandoned building in Addateegala mandal
