= National Highway 316 (India) =

National highway in India

National Highway 316
- Map of National Highway 316 in red

Major junctions
- From: Bhubaneswar
- To: Satpada

Location
- Country: India
- States: Odisha

Highway system
- Roads in India; Expressways; National; State; Asian
← NH 16	→ NH 316

National Highway 316 (NH 316) is a National Highway in India. It connects Bhubaneswar and Puri – Satpada in Odisha.
