= Kandha Gauda =

Cattle herding tribe of Odisha

Total population
- 26,403 (2011, census)

Languages
- Kui, Odia

Religion
- Hinduism, Christianity

Related ethnic groups
- Kandha, Dangaria Kandha

Kandha Gauda (also known as Tanla Gauda) is a cattle herding tribal community of Odisha, India. They communicate within their group using the Kui language and use Odia for interaction with society.

== Etymology ==
The name "Kandha Gouda" originates from the Kondh tribe and "Gouda" (meaning cattle herder in Odia). They earned this name due to their bartani relationship, means working as cattle herders for the Kondh tribe in exchange for annual remuneration.

== Overview ==
The Kandha Gauda, traditionally a cattle herding community, resides alongside the Kondh tribe in Odisha. Their way of life closely resembles that of the Kondh, and they are considered a subsection or derived community of the Kandh tribe. In colonial census records, they were grouped with the Kondh tribe, and post-independence, they are recognized as Scheduled Tribes in Odisha. As of the 2011 census, their population is 26,403, primarily scattered in districts such as Kandhamal, Nayagarh, Sundargarh, Bolangir, Malkangiri, Sambalpur, Koraput and Nawarangpur. Their literacy rate stands at 56.49%. In 1981, their growth rate was 111.40%, but it gradually declined to -16.06% in 2011. The literacy rate, however, experienced positive growth over the years.

== Society ==
The Kandha Gauda coexist with the Kondh tribe, sharing the same socio-cultural values. Their society lacks a clan system but is divided into exogamous lineage groups, including Pradhan, Behera, Nayak, and Boi. Monogamy is the norm, though polygamy is not restricted. Marriage through negotiation is considered prestigious, while other modes like capture, elopement, and purchase are accepted. Junior levirate, sororate, and remarriage of widows and widowers are permitted. Their family structure is nuclear, patrilocal, and patrilineal.

Cremation rituals align with Hindu practices, except in cases of child or pregnancy-related deaths, where burial occurs, and a death pollution period of eleven days is observed. The Kandha Gauda follow a diverse religious path, blending their autonomous tribal religion with Hinduism. They worship Baral Devi communally and celebrate the Gotha Puja festival, honoring Badi Debata with a Kendu stick. Magico-religious functionaries like Jani, Dehuri, and Guru conduct their ritual activities. The Jati Mahasabha, a traditional caste council, oversees customary affairs with a chief called Bisoi at the helm.

The Kandha Gauda, traditionally engaged in pastoralism through cattle herding, have adapted to modernization by diversifying their livelihoods. In addition to their traditional practices, they now taken up agriculture, forest collection, leaf plate making, mat-making, and wage earning to sustain their way of life.
