= Justice On Trial =

Justice On Trial (JOT) is a Gujarat based non-governmental organization that aims to promote unity and integrity of the nation through exposure of injustice prevailing in various areas of India, with the goal of suggesting ways to eradicate them. JOT chooses topics for enquiry on the basis of, "information received from various sources about grievances of classes of people in various parts of the country in respect of injustices and inequalities in various spheres of the society and the public response to such problems."

== Background ==
Justice On Trial is a Trust duly registered under the Bombay Public Trusts Act,1950 having its registered office at Ahmedabad, Gujarat. It is a non-government, non-political institution run by citizens who have decades of experience in working in diverse fields of human activity. The organization describes its mission as follows:

Members of JOT are deeply concerned about the problems faced by various sections of the society in different parts of the country and are always ready to extend a helping hand to the affected people by enquiring into and finding out the root causes of the problem and providing and suggesting possible solutions as also by spreading information about the correct factual situation and by espousing the cause of the affected people before various government and non-government organizations. JOT aims at exposing and eliminating all kinds of injustices in the society at all levels and for this purpose institutes Enquiries and Fact finding Committees from time to time focussing on specific problems.

== Notable cases ==
In 2006, JOT undertook a fact-finding committee in the Dang district to determine the truth regarding conflicting reports surrounding the Shabari Kumbh Mela, meeting with local Christian and Hindu leaders.

Another enquiry looked into the problems in Singur and Nandigram in West Bengal in the year 2007. It was headed by Honourable Justice Shri M. Ramkrishna, former Chief Justice of Jammu & Kashmir and Assam High Courts.

A further enquiry was held on the incidents of the Kandhmal district of Orissa. This committee was headed by Shri G.S. Gill, former Additional Advocate General of Rajasthan.

In addition, an enquiry was held to investigate the problems of the North Cachhar Hills of Assam under the chairmanship of Honourable Shri Justice M.V. Tamaskar, former Judge of Madhya Pradesh High Court. Eminent persons including Honourable Shri Justice S.M. Soni, former Judge of the Gujarat High Court and former Lokayukta of Gujarat, Shri P.C. Dogra IPS (Retd), former Director General of Police, Punjab, Shri Y.R. Patil IPS (Retd), and Smt. Nafeesa Hussain, former member of the National Commission for Women, were associated with these enquiries as members of committee.

In 2008, JOT published a report regarding the murder of Swami Laxmananand Saraswati by Christian terrorists from the rebel group the National Liberation Front of Tripura, pointing out that, "Christian missionaries attacked Swami eight times earlier for opposing clandestine conversion activities." The report also dismissed claims that the murder was conducted solely by "Maoists."

JOT conducted a survey of the Jammu region in 2010, finding that:

...inadequate relief is being provided to the affected people while delay in processing relief cases, non-registration of migrated people of Jammu province, complaints regarding SRO-43, no payment of salaries to the SPOs, injustice with the VDCs, no special employment package for affected areas and worst condition of Talwara migrants are other problems being faced by the population in these areas.

All the above enquiries were completed within reasonable time and the reports of the committees were forwarded to high dignitaries and responsible authorities including the President of India and the Governors of concerned States. Action is being taken on the reports of these committees.

== Notable members ==
- Justice S.M. Soni (Retd.), Gujarat High Court and former Lokayukta of Gujarat
- Sardar Gucharan Singh Gill, Additional Advocate General, Government of Rajasthan, Sikh Activist
- V.S. Kokje, former Himachal Pradesh Governor and Judge of Madhya Pradesh, and former Acting Chief Justice of the Rajasthan High Court
- P.C. Dogra Indian Police Service (Retd), former Director General of Police, Punjab
- Justice M.V. Tamaskar, former Judge of Madhya Pradesh High Court
- Y.R. Patil Indian Police Service (Retd)
- Nafisa Hussain, Muslim women's rights activist, and former member of the National Commission for Women
- Captain M.K. Andhare
- Retd Judge M.T. Kikani District and Sessions Judgse Ahmedabad, Ex Judicial Member, Gujarat Civil Service Tribunal, Ex Judicial Member, Railway Claim Tribunal, Guwahati Bench
- Yazadi Karanjia
- Manishaben Joshi
- Deen Mohammad Otha, M.D., a renowned gynecologist of Bhavnagar, Gujarat,
- Yogesh Patel, M.D., psychiatrist of Vadodara, Gujarat
- Maya Bohra, prominent practising psychologist from Indore
- Sukhpreet Kaur Grewal, prominent social activist from Bhopal
- Shri Kanhaiyalal Joshi, social activist from Ahmedabad
- Y.N. Karanjia, Dramatist, Educationist, winner of Gujarat Gaurav Award from Surat

== See also ==
- Indian NGOs
