= Pano (caste) =

Pan

Total population
- 1,205,099 (2011 Census)

Regions with significant populations
- Majority; Odisha; Minority; West Bengal, Jharkhand and Bihar

Languages
- Odia

Religion
- Hinduism, Buddhism

The Pano (also known as Pan) are a Scheduled Caste community of the Indian state of Odisha, as well as in Bihar, West Bengal and Jharkhand officially. They speak Odia.

== Demographics ==
According to the 2011 Census, 1,205,099 people in Odisha were members of this caste, constituting 17.7% of the total SC population and being the most populous of the scheduled castes of Odisha. The Pano have the largest population in Jajpur district, followed by Kendujhar district and Dhenkanal district, but they constitute the highest proportion (77.9%) of the total SC population in Kandhamal district. In Odisha, 14% of them have middle educational level and about 13% have more. 60.9% of their children in the 5–14 years group were at school. 16.8% of the Pano workers were cultivators, 54.3% agricultural labourers, 4.2% HHI workers and 24.7% other workers. 16.89% of the total population of Kandhamal district are members of a scheduled caste, with most of them being Pano (77.92%). Kendujhar district consists of 11.62% members of scheduled castes, of which the Pano make up 58.77%. In 1891, those living in Sitra were called workers in metal, speaking Kui and Odia. Intermarriage to Khonds and Odias was not permitted.

=== Subdivision ===
Panos have several sub-castes: the Odia, who claim a higher social status than the others; Buna, who are weavers; Betra or Raj, basketmakers, bamboo workers, and also performers of watchman duties; Baistab, Panos who are Vaishnavites and perform their religious ceremonies; and Patraida, Panos who live alongside the Khondhs. This last subset is often simply referred to as the Khonda Panos, while the others are collectively referred to as Desa Panos.

Colonial ethnographers such as Herbert Hope Risley theorized that they were Dravidians who became "Hinduized."

== Culture ==
The Pan have a group of totemistic exogamous clans, traced down the father's line. However, this system of exogamy only considers ancestors only a few generations back and in the area, and so only excludes those of the clan in the area. This system of exogamy is followed by tribals throughout central and eastern India and is dubbed "local lines" by anthropologists. However, within this system, Panos ban marriage between someone and their first cousins and paternal uncle.

== Religion ==
At the turn of the 20th century, the Panos, although nominally Vaishnavites, were practicing animism similar to neighbouring Dravidian tribes. They held a belief in certain village deities who were to be propitiated to induce fertility or stave off ruin, primarily via animal sacrifice. Their main deity was Pauri Pahari, the god who lived upon the highest of the local hills, and to him they would offer goat sacrifices. The Panos of southern Odisha maintain they were always animists like their Khond neighbours. Today, however, most the Panos are Catholics.

== Status ==
Due to a Presidential Order in 1950, Panos who converted to Christianity could no longer hold SC status. Pano organization Phulbani Kui Janakalyan Samiti, started in 2002, sought to give Panos Scheduled Tribe status due to their knowledge of Kui. This effort was opposed by the Khonds - the government soon denied Panos the ST status and hundreds of Pano government employees were fired for falsifying caste certificates. These tensions would culminate in the Kandhamal Riots, when, after the murder of Saraswati which was claimed to be done by Christians, (Note: Maoists later claimed they killed him for inciting communal tensions as a member of Vishwa Hindu Parishad, a Hindtuva group) mobs of tribals and non-tribals attacked Pano settlements and churches throughout Kandhamal. Many Panos were displaced and lost everything, and as of 2017, the situation between the two communities has not returned to normalcy.
