= Jhond =

Jhonds/Jhonda
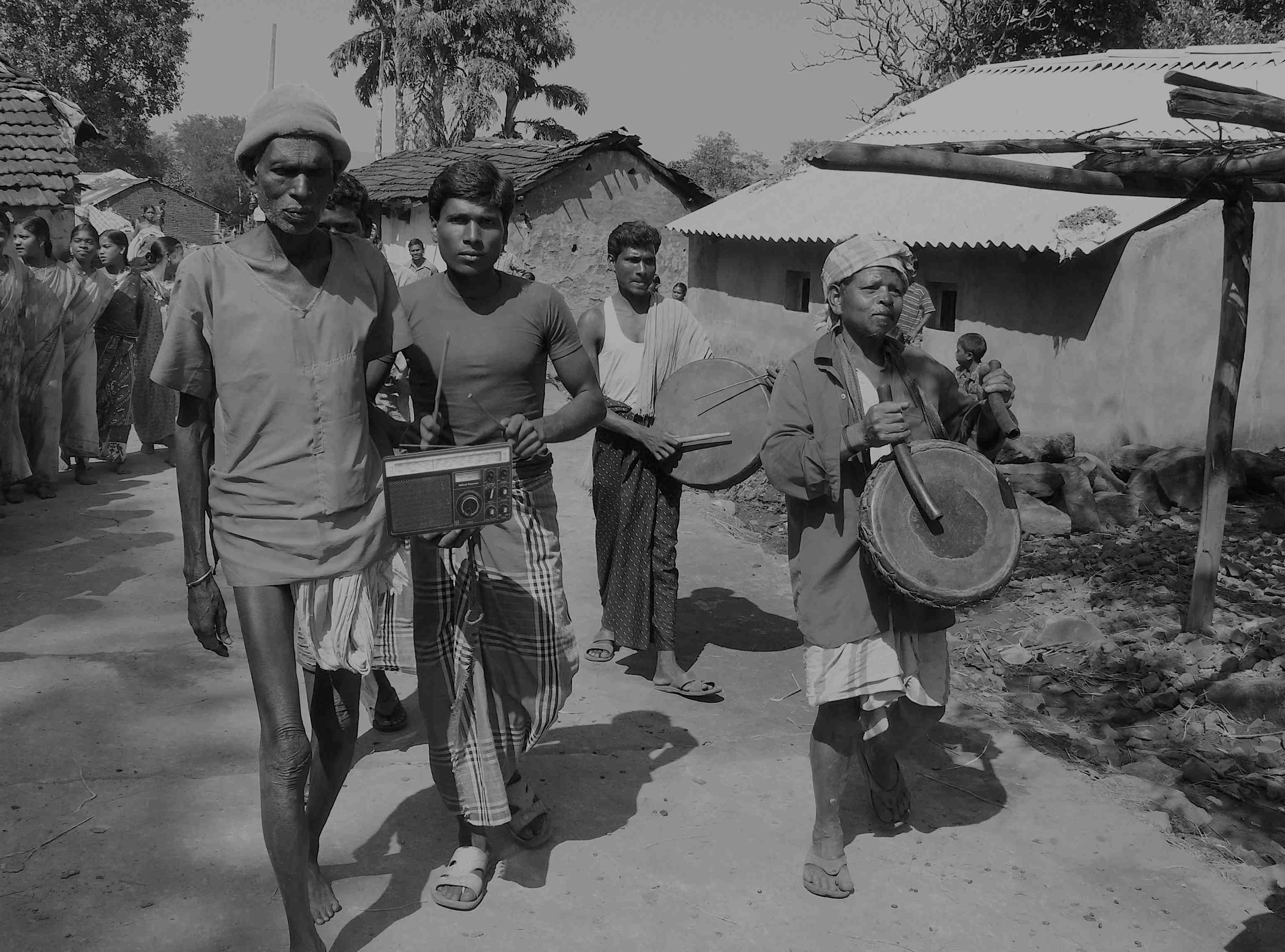
- Jhond Folk musicians

The Jhonds or Jhonda are aboriginal inhabitants of south eastern Orissa and Northern Andhra Pradesh. They are often referred to as adivasis. The Jhond language is Kui which is classified as a south central Dravidian language. The Jhonds comprise a minority population of the districts of Srikakulam and Vzianagaram in Andhra Pradesh.

== History ==
The adivasi is a broad term for a heterogeneous set of ethnic and tribal groups claimed to be the aboriginal population of India. The concept of the “original inhabitants” of India is a matter of contentious research. The Jhonds are thought of be mixtures of Austro-Asiatic Austroloid and Indo-Aryan even though the language they speak belongs to the South Central branch of the Dravidian Language.

== Art and culture ==
The Jhonds are originally hunter gatherers who have now extensively adopted farming and raising animals although some still practice foraging. The Jhonds tend to have relatively non-hierarchical, egalitarian social structures. Mutual exchange and sharing of resources were important economic systems and this is codified in their folktales, songs and visual art. Jhond crafts consist of basket weaving and jewellery made out of shells. The women tend to decorate themselves with tattoos shaped in intricate geometric patterns on their faces and arms. The Jhonds are also well known for their unusual practice of adopting the radio as an integral part of their folk songs. Their songs are currently being archived by Dr. Ghere, a student of Verrier Elwin.

== Religion ==
Most Jhonds primarily practice animism mixed with Hinduism. A minority of Jhonds have, in recent times, adopted Christianity.

== Food practice and diet ==
The Jhond diet consists of food cooked in Sal and Mahua seeds

== Language ==
The Jhond language is Kui which is classified as a south central Dravidian language.

== Modern history ==
Aluminium or Bauxite mining has contributed in large scale to the displacement of the Jhonda social structure. The pollution from mining factories has rendered large areas uncultivable.
