= Lodu Sikaka =

Lodu Sikaka is a Dongria Kondh tribal and a leader of Niyamgiri Suraksha Samiti in Odisha state, India. According to the advocacy group Survival International, reporting local sources, he was one of two leaders who were abducted in August 2010 after they had been peacefully protesting a bauxite mine that Vedanta Resources and the Government of Odisha proposed to create on land upon which the tribe traditionally depended. Some reports at the time suggested he was being held by the police, though the police themselves refuse to confirm this.

In August 2010, Lodu Sikaka claimed that he was abducted for a few hours by some unknown people who, he later alleged, were policemen. He was allegedly released after he signed an undertaking not to instigate people to act in contempt of court, as he had been accused of making secessionist and anti-India speeches.
