= Kandhamal district =

- District of Odisha
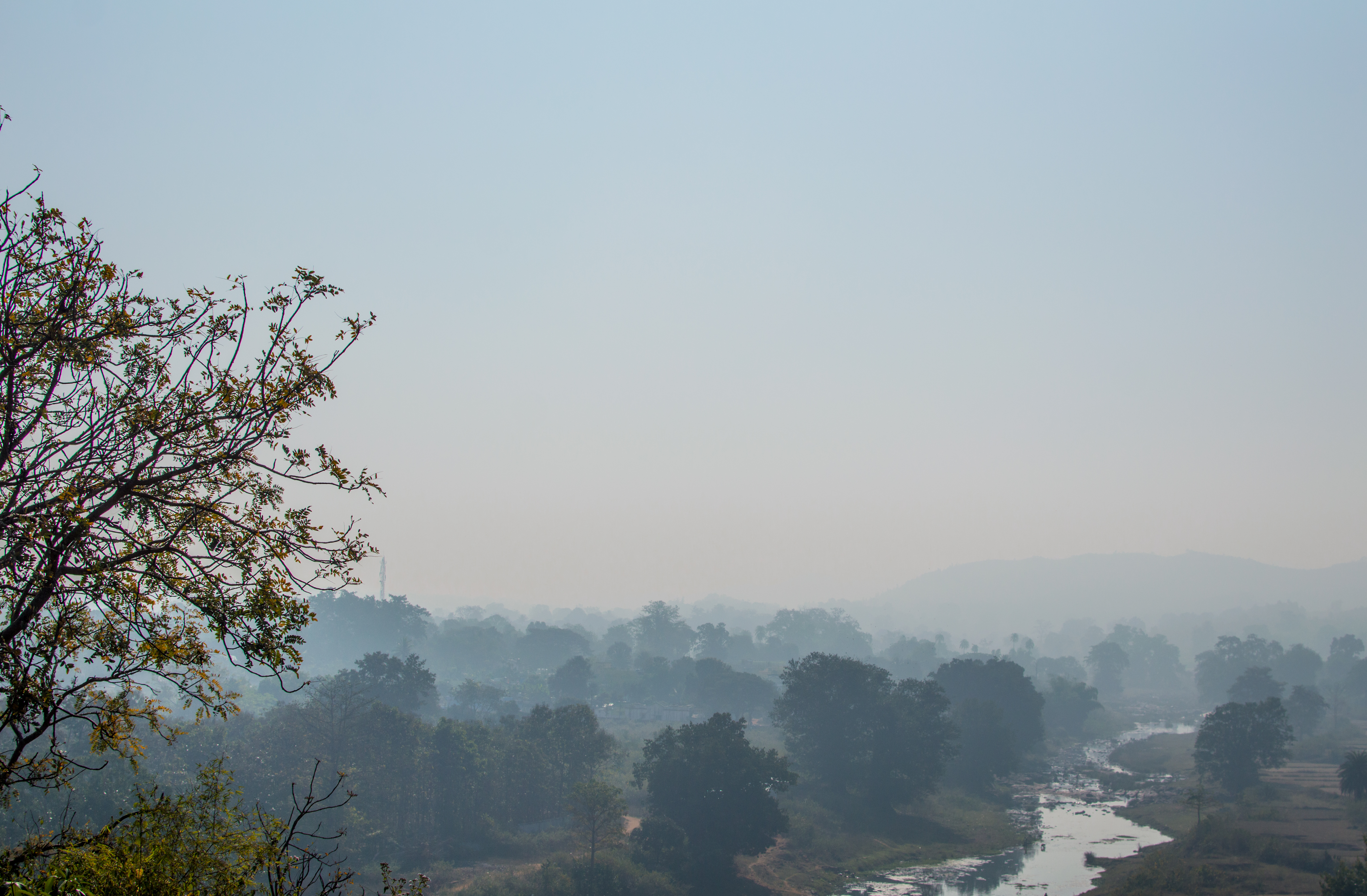
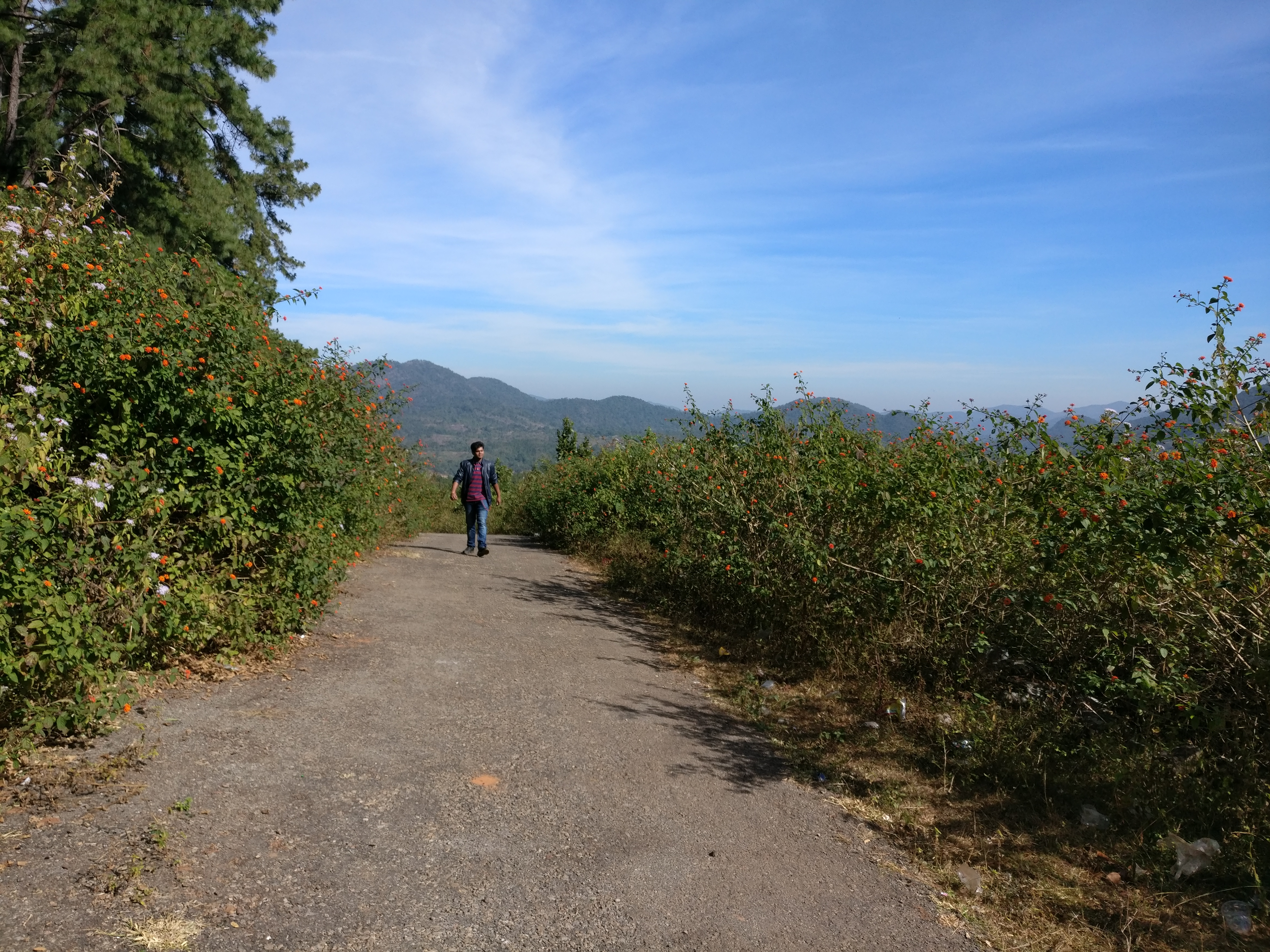
- Top: Misty view of Phulbani; Bottom: Daringbadi
- Interactive map of Kandhamal district
- Coordinates: 20.47°N 84.23°E
- Country: India
- State: Odisha
- Named for: Kandha tribe
- Headquarters: Phulbani

Government
  - Member of Parliament: Sukanta Kumar Panigrahi (BJP)
  - Collector and District Magistrate: Mr. Vedbhusan, IAS
  - Superintendent of Police: Harisha B C, IPS
  - Divisional Forest Officer Cum Wildlife Warden: Vishwanath Neelannavar, IFS

Area
  - Total: 8,021 km^{2} (3,097 sq mi)
  - Rank: 6th
  - Forest: 5,709 km^{2} (2,204 sq mi)
- Elevation: 700 m (2,300 ft)

Population (2011)
  - Total: 733,110
  - Density: 91.40/km^{2} (236.7/sq mi)
  - Urban: 72,279 (9.86%)
  - Rural: 660,831 (90.14%)

Demographic
  - Sex ratio: 1,037 ♀/1000 ♂
  - Literacy rate: 64.13%
  - Scheduled Castes: 15.76% (115,544)
  - Scheduled Tribes: 53.58% (392,820)

Languages
  - Official: Odia; English
  - Local: Kui
- Time zone: UTC+5:30 (IST)
- PIN: 762 022
- Vehicle registration: OD-12-xxxx
- Climate: Aw (Köppen)
- Precipitation: 1,587 mm (62.5 in)
- Avg. summer temperature: 40 °C (104 °F)
- Avg. winter temperature: 5 °C (41 °F)
- Lok Sabha constituency: Kandhamal
- Vidhan Sabha constituency: 3: 082-Baliguda(ST) 083-G.Udayagiri(ST) 084-Phulbani(ST)
- Website: kandhamal.nic.in

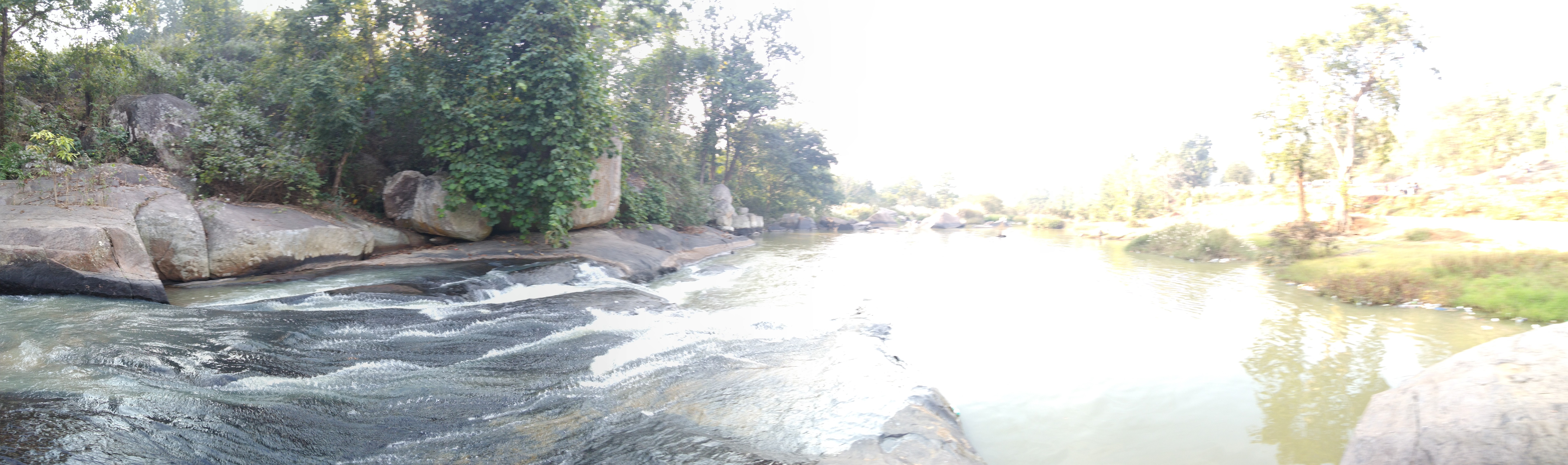

Kandhamal district is a district in the state of Odisha, India. The District headquarters is the city of Phulbani. It is a district full with natural beauties, including wild animals and birds.

Kandhamal is famous for its local turmeric renowned as 'Kandhamal Haldi' which has earned the Geographical indication (GI) tag from Intellectual Property India, an organisation functioning under the auspices of the Ministry of Commerce and Industry (India).

== History ==
The Kandhamal district was established on January 1, 1994, following the division of Phulbani District into Kandhamal and Boudh Districts in Odisha, India. The district derived its name from the prominent Kandha tribe, which inhabits the region.

== Geography ==
The district lies between 83.30° E to 84-48° E longitude and 19-34° N to 20-54° latitude. The district headquarters is Phulbani, located in the central part of the district. The other popular locations are Baliguda, G. Udayagiri, Tikabali and Raikia. Daringabadi (Kashmir of Odisha)

The territory is rural, with a number of waterfalls, springs, hill stations, and historical and archaeological places.

- Area: 8,021 km²
- Altitude: 300 to 1100 meter
- Rainfall: 1,597 millimetres (62.9 in)
- Climate: Minimum temperature (December) 1 °C (34 °F); maximum temperature (May) 35 °C (95 °F)

A majority of the land area of the district (71%) is forests, and 12% of the land is cultivable. The road connectivity with other districts is poor. Kandhamal is one of the poorest districts in Orissa, ranking 29th out of 30 districts by the Human Development Index.

== Demographics ==
Historical population
| Year | Pop. | ±% |
|---|---|---|
| 1901 | 211,421 | — |
| 1911 | 239,272 | +13.2% |
| 1921 | 238,206 | −0.4% |
| 1931 | 260,557 | +9.4% |
| 1941 | 284,855 | +9.3% |
| 1951 | 289,182 | +1.5% |
| 1961 | 323,991 | +12.0% |
| 1971 | 393,773 | +21.5% |
| 1981 | 448,914 | +14.0% |
| 1991 | 546,281 | +21.7% |
| 2001 | 648,201 | +18.7% |
| 2011 | 733,110 | +13.1% |
Source: Census of India

Religions in Kandhamal district (2011)
| Religion | Percent |
| Hinduism | 79.16% |
| Christianity | 20.31% |
| Other or not stated | 0.53% |

According to the 2011 census Kandhamal district has a population of 733,110, roughly equal to the nation of Guyana or the US state of Alaska. This gives it a ranking of 497th in India (out of a total of 640). The district has a population density of 91 inhabitants per square kilometre (240/sq mi). Its population growth rate over the decade 2001-2011 was 12.92%. Kandhamal has a sex ratio of 1037 females for every 1000 males, and a literacy rate of 65.12%. 9.86% of the population lives in urban areas. Scheduled Castes and Scheduled Tribes collectively account for 69.34% (SC: 15.76% and ST: 53.58%) of the district's total population. Kandha and Pan are the two dominant communities of the district, comprising over half the population with 50% and 12% respectively. While other Scheduled communities like Gond, Kandha Gauda, Haddi, Ghasi, Savar (Soura), Tanla, Keuta, Dom, and Dhoba also have a considerable presence. The district's general population makes up the remaining 30.66%.

Languages of Kandhamal district (2011)
1. Odia (53.1%)
2. Kui (45.6%)
3. Other (1.20%)

At the time of the 2011 Census of India, 53.15% of the population in the district spoke Odia and 45.65% Kui as their first language.

A majority of the inhabitants belong to the Kondh tribe, following various religious faiths, who are said to be "proud and aggressive", in the words of a district official. The Kondhs hold 77% of the cultivable land. Khond Scheduled Tribes (including 21% Protestant Christian Khond tribals) make up the total of 53.6% of the population of the District.

Panos (the main Dalit community) hold less than 9% of the cultivable land. Officially Hindu, the Scheduled Castes, most of whom belong to Pano (Scheduled Caste) community, make up 15.8% of the population. However it is estimated that more than 10. 3% of the aforementioned 15.8% Panos in Kandhamal, while claiming to be Hindu in documents, covertly practise Catholicism in reality, and hence they are not even legally eligible for Scheduled Caste Status.

The majority of Panos are "covert" Catholics and there have been intercinine conflicts between the Catholic Panos and Protestant/ Hindu Khonds in Kandhamal over land resources.

== Agriculture ==
Rice is the primary staple food and crop of Kandhamal district. In recent years residents have focused on horticulture, sericulture, floriculture and other agricultural activities apart from rice. The district is full of flora and fauna. A wide variety of wildflowers like orchids are found in the dense forests of the district. Mango, mahula (mahua), Indian gooseberry (amla), kendu, meswak and jackfruit are also found in abundance in the wilderness. Bamboo and Thysanolaena (broom grass) are collected from the forests of Kandhamal and used or sold. A special pulse known as kandula is native to this district; the Kondh people mostly cultivate it in the hilly forests. The organic turmeric cultivated in this district is popularly known as 'Kandhamal Haladi' and is renowned for its purity. An organization called Kasam promotes turmeric cultivation in the district. In some areas ginger is also cultivated along with turmeric.

== Geographical indication ==
Kandhamal Haladi was awarded the Geographical Indication (GI) status tag from the Geographical Indications Registry, under the Union Government of India, on 1 April 2019 valid upto 10 January 2028.

Kandhamal Apex Spices Association for Marketing (KASAM) from Kandhamal, proposed the GI registration of Kandhamal Haladi. After filing the application in January 2018, the turmeric was granted the GI tag in 2019 by the Geographical Indication Registry in Chennai, making the name "Kandhamal Haladi" exclusive to the turmeric grown in the region. It thus became the first turmeric variety from Odisha and the 17th type of goods from Odisha to earn the GI tag.

The prestigious GI tag, awarded by the GI registry, certifies that a product possesses distinct qualities, adheres to traditional production methods, and has earned a reputation rooted in its geographical origin.

== Culture ==
=== Festivals ===
The people of Kandhamal celebrate many religious festivals from their tribal culture as well as many Odia festivals. The Danda Nach is celebrated in the district mainly by the Kondh tribals, following their traditional religion. They observe this for thirteen days in the Hindu month of Chaitra. People go fasting for all the thirteen days who viewed for the particular boon or for grace from the goddess Kaali. The festival starts on the first of April and closes on the thirteenth day. The closing ceremony is called Meru. Kondhas consume the first mango of the season, only after it has been offered to the goddess Kaali on the evening of Meru.

In the month of January, Kondhs perform worship rituals after harvesting in the villages as per their own convenience. This puja is called Sisaa Laka. In the month of March they perform puja to get blessings from Darni Penu (the village deity) and Saru Penu (a mountain deity) to collect the mahula flower and green mangoes as well as the forest products. After offering to the deity, they collect the product to use as food, etc.

In the month of April/May they offer the mohula flower in the form of cakes to the village deity; this is called Maranga Laka. On special occasions Kedu Laka is done depending on the requirement of the mother earth, which is decided by the village priest, locally called Kuta Gatanju. Kedu Laka is one of the main occasions among the Kandha tribes in Raikia block; they do Kedu Laka to eat mangoes of the village.

After the sowing of the crops, to appease the mother earth, puja is performed for good crops at the village deity by the priest called Jakera. This Puja is called Bora Laka. This puja is done in the month of September/October. In the month of November/December new crops are collected; chuda and rice are prepared and made into khiri (rice pudding), which is offered to the village deity, and the villagers eat the new harvest.

The major Hindu festivals like Holi, Diwali, Rakshabandhan, Shivratri, Ram Navami and Janmashtami are celebrated by Kondhs and other Hindus in the district with equal fervor. The Hindu month of Kartik is considered sacred by tribal and other Hindu residents of the district; people observe fasting and stay away from non-vegetarian food and alcohol. Nowadays people celebrate the Savan (Shravan) month by offering their prayers to Shiva and carrying water to Shiv temples walking barefoot. During Rakshabandhan, village children organize a game called Gamhadiyan, where a small earthen pedestal is created and a string containing toffes is hung over it. Children jump over the pedestal to pluck and win the goodies from the string.

Many of the Khond tribal people converted to Protestant Christianity in the late 19th century, and they celebrate Christmas and Easter as well. Some of the Kondhs follow Islam and Eid; Ramzan and Muharram are also celebrated.

The Catholic Panos celebrate Christmas and Easter while the Hindu Panos celebrate all Hindu festivals. There are several Panos who have converted from Catholicism and Hinduism to Buddhism, especially in Raikia and Balliguda, and they celebrate Buddha Jayanti religious festivals.

There are other small communities of Sikhs and Jains who also celebrate their religious festivals.

=== Places of interest ===
Balaskumpa is a village in this south-east of Kandhmal (Phulbani) Sub-Division situated 20-25’N and 84-21’ at the confluence of two hilly streams, which combine to form the Pilla Salki river. It is 15 km (9.3 mi) from the Phulbani district headquarters, connected by a good road.

Belghar is situated at a height of more than 2,000 feet (609.6 metres) above the sea level in Balliguda sub-division. It is 70 km (43 mi) from Balliguda and 155 km from Phulbani. The area has a number of mountains, forest and wild animals, especially elephants. It has an Inspection Bungalow of Forest Department, which is built with wooden planks. It is lighted by solar power. Ushabali valley is near the village. Sometimes flocks of peacocks or wild elephants are seen by the roadside.

Chakapad is situated about 800 ft (243.84 m) from sea level in G. Udayagiri Tahasil. The historical Bhrutanga River originates here.

Another temple dedicated to Lord Anandeswar and Jogeswar (Siva) is located nearby; one big fair is held here on the Sivaratri day. The place is situated in the midst of thick forest.

Daringbadi is situated at a height of about 3,000 ft (914.4 m) above sea level in Balliguda sub-division. It is 105 km (65 mi) from Phulbani. It can be approached directly from Berhampur. The place is attractive in the summer season due to its low temperatures. Hill View point has been developed at Daringbadi, where visitors can view the valley. A tourist complex has been built at Daringibadi for accommodation of tourists. Coffee plantations attract visitors to Daringibadi all through the year.

Dungi is about 45 km from Phulbani, situated on Phulbani-Berhampur road in G. Udayagiri Tehsil. This is the only archaeological site in Kandhamal district. There was one Buddha Vihar of the 11th century; since it was ruined, Siva temples have come up on the site, excavated during construction of new temples, and are kept in the temple premises. One Buddha statue has been shifted from the nearby area to the Odisha State Museum, Bhubaneswar.

Jalespeta is a valley about 127 km from Phulbani, situated near Tumudibandh. It is the site of a Shiva temple located right between the hilly river rock bed. The banks of the tiny river surprisingly have white sand, which is very rare for this place. This part of the state usually doesn't have such clear white sand, which is common in coastal region river banks and sea shores.

Kalinga Valley (Kalinga Ghaats) is located 48 km away from Phulbani, the district headquarters on the Phulbani – Berhampur National Highway. The valley is famous for silviculture garden and medicinal plant cultivation. The silviculture garden has rubber trees and human-thick bamboo plants.

Ludu is located about 100 km (62 mi) from Balliguda in Kotagarh Block and 185 km from Phulbani. It is situated in dense forest inhabited by wild elephants. One fair-weather road leads to the side via Subarngiri. There is a 100-foot (30.5 m) high waterfall.

Mandasaru Kuti is located about 100 km from Phulbani in the Raikia Block. There is an old church on the outskirts of the village, surrounded by mountains. There is a mountain gorge nearby. Lodging options available.

Pakadajhar is about 30 km from Phulbani town near the village Sudrukumpa, situated on Phulbani-Boudh road in Phulbani Tahasil. The Pakdajhar waterfall is 60 feet high, and is nestled in the natural forest. There is a single road leading to the site from Sudrukumpa. With recent development of the destinations, a lot of tourists visit the place for picnics from early November to the end of February.

Putudi is 18 km from Phulbani town with a waterfall of 100 feet (30 m) height, situated in the dense forest. One good road leads to the site. The waterfall is on the river Salunki.

Rushimal is situated about 50 km from Daringibadi, near the village Tamangi in Hattimunda G. P. A group of hills known as Rushimal hills are the origin of the river Rushikulya. At the source there is a small reservoir known as “Rushikunda”, and above the hilltop a cave known as Rushigumpha.The river Rushikulya is originated from Rushimal hills.

Urmagada is 17 km from Phulbani town on Phulbani-Gochhapada road in Phulbani Tahasil. The waterfall is 50 feet high, situated in a dense forest. One fair-weather road leads to the site.

Kotagarh is located in Kandhamal district about 120 km from Phulabani and 54 km from Baliguda. In the Kotagarh block there is a 375 m waterfall. Maa Bhabani Temple is in Keshragu, 2 km from Kotagarh (Bighna). Kotagarh also has a wildlife sanctuary with elephants, tigers, nilgai, wild boar, chital and antelopes. Along with a variety of reptiles and mammals, the sanctuary has an aviary as well. The aviary has red jungle fowl, peafowl, peacocks and a wide variety of wild birds.

Kuruduawaterfall is situated at the village of Ladimaha in Kotagada block about 160 km from the district headquarter Phulbani. It is surrounded with dense bamboo forest.

== Transport ==
The nearest airport is at Bhubaneswar 211 km (131 mi). There is an airstrip at Gudari 5 km from Phulbani town for landing small planes and helicopters.

The nearest railway station is Rairakhol, on the Sambalpur – Bhubaneshwar line, which is 99 km from Phulbani. However, Berhampur (165 km (103 mi) from Phulbani) is another convenient rail link.

By road, Kandhamal can be approached from Sambalpur via Boudh (170 km, 106 miles) and Berhampur (165 km) as well as from Bhubaneshwar via Nayagarh (210 km, 130 miles). It is 170 km (110 mi) away from Bolangir.

While there are no dedicated tourist buses to the places of interest in the district, taxis may be hired at Phulbani or Balliguda. There is no railway route in the district.

== Health facilities ==
There are fourteen hospitals:

- District Headquarters Hospital, Phulbani
- Sub Divisional Hospital, Balliguda
- Community Health Centre, Subarnagiri
- Community Health Centre, Tumudibandha
- Community Health Centre, Barakhama
- Community Health Centre, Daringbadi
- Community Health Centre, K.Nuagaon
- Community Health Centre, Raikia
- Community Health Centre, G.Udayagiri
- Community Health Centre, Brahamanpad
- Community Health Centre, Tikabali
- Community Health Centre, Gumagarh
- Community Health Centre, Phiringia
- Community Health Centre, Khajuripada

== Communal unrest and insurgency ==
On 25 December 2007, ethnic conflict broke out between Khond tribals and Pano Scheduled Caste people in Kandhamals.

The 2008 Kandhamal violence was the violence against Christians incited by Hindutva organisations in the Kandhamal district of Orissa, India, in August 2008 after the murder of Lakshmanananda Saraswati, a leader of the Vishva Hindu Parishad, a right-wing Hindutva group. According to government reports the violence resulted in at least 39 Christians killed. Reports indicate that more than 395 churches were razed or torched, between 5,600 and 6,500 houses plundered or burnt down, over 600 villages ransacked and more than 60,000 – 75,000 people left homeless. Other reports put the death toll at nearly 100 and suggested more than 40 women were sexually assaulted. Unofficial reports placed the number of those killed at more than 500. Many Christian families were burnt alive. Thousands of Christians were forced to convert to Hinduism under threat of violence. Many Hindu families were also assaulted in some places because they supported the Indian National Congress (INC). This violence was led by Hindutva paramilitary organisations, those being the Bajrang Dal, the Rashtriya Swayamsevak Sangh, and the Vishva Hindu Parishad.

Tensions reportedly started with violent incidents over Christmas 2007 which resulted in the burning of over 100 churches and church institutions, including hostels, convents, and over 700 houses. Three persons were also killed during the three days after Christmas. The Hindutva groups and activists of the Kui Samaj were mostly involved in the 2007 attacks. Following the riots, 20,000 people were sheltered in 14 government established relief camps and 50,000 people fled to the surrounding districts and states. The United States Commission on International Religious Freedom reported that by March 2009, at least 3,000 individuals were still in government relief camps.

Manoj Pradhan, an MLA of the Bharatiya Janata Party was convicted in the violence in 2010. 18 people were also convicted in the same year. Seven Christians and a Maoist leader were convicted for the murder of Lakshmanananda Saraswati on 2013.

In April 2010, a special "fast track" court in Phulbani convicted 105 people. Ten people were acquitted due to lack of evidence.

It is currently a part of the Red Corridor of India, an area with significant Maoist insurgency activity. The hilly and forested interior of Kandhamal has provided cover for small units of the Communist Party of India (Maoist), particularly the Kalahandi–Kandhamal–Boudh–Nayagarh (KKBN) division, which have been involved in attacks on security forces, road construction work and local political actors. On 27 November 2010, suspected Maoist rebels detonated a roadside landmine near Brahmanigaon, blowing up an ambulance and killing at least five people, including two women and a child. In July 2011, three landmines planted by Maoists exploded during a combing operation in the Sonepur Ghati forest of Daringbadi area, injuring two security personnel, and in October 2011 police recovered nearly 100 kg of explosives and landmines from a road near Godibali village in Daringbadi block, averting what authorities described as a major attack.
