= Ashutosh Tudu =

Indian politician

Ashutosh Tudu is an Indian Maoist politician and politburo member of Communist Party of India (Maoist).

== Career ==
Tudu is popularly known as Motilal Soren alias Ashok. He belongs to Kolharia village in Dhanbad district of Indian state of Jharkhand. Tudu joined the Maoist Communist Centre of India (MCCI) in 1999. After the formation of Communist Party of India (Maoist) in 2004, he became a prominent member of Central Committee and in charge of Eastern bureau of the Central Military Commission of the party. Thereafter he became the member of Politburo, the highest decision-making body of CPI (Maoist). Tudu was allegedly involved with the attack in police armoury of Nayagarh town in February 2008 in which at least 14 people, including 13 policemen, were killed. Police claimed that he was the mastermind in the conspiracy to murder of Vishva Hindu Parishad leader Swami Lakshmanananda Saraswati and also involved in the murder of former Jharkhand chief minister Babulal Marandi's son Anup Marandi in October 2007. He was wanted in Orissa, Andhra Pradesh, Chhattisgarh, Jharkhand, West Bengal and Bihar. Police arrested Tudu and another Maoist leader Atul Yadav alias Rajiv on 3 March 2009 near steel city Rourkela while they were returning from Saranda forest after a meeting.
