= Tikabali =

- Town
- Interactive map of Tikabali
- Coordinates: 19.7981°N 84.3674°E
- Country: India
- State: Odisha
- District: Kandhamal

Languages
  - Official: Odia
- Time zone: UTC+5:30 (IST)
- PIN: 762010
- Telephone code: 06847
- Vehicle registration: OD-12
- Coastline: 100 kilometres (62 mi)
- Nearest city: Phulbani/Brahmapur/Bhubaneswar
- Sex ratio: 1000/1017 (M/F) ♂/♀
- Avg. summer temperature: 42 °C (108 °F)
- Avg. winter temperature: 3 °C (37 °F)
- Website: odisha.gov.in

Tikabali is a small town in Kandhamal district, a central district of Odisha state in India. The town having an approximate population of more than 10,000 is known for Turmeric trading. As a business centre, its economy is boomed and boosted by A.M.C.S., a co-operative society helping tribal people getting value for their tribal collections. At present, AMCS is dead for more than seven years and the working of AMCS is affected due to that the local tribes are affected but some youths of Tikabali town are trying to once again starting the working of AMCS. River Pilasalunki flow aside the town providing water. One of the main attractive point of the town is Jagannath Temple, from where you can see the entire town around.

Recently a tehsil office has been established by the revenue department of Odisha. The town holds a weekly market on every Friday. That day people from the nearby localities attend the weekly market. The weekly market is regulated by the R.M.C. (Regulating Marketing Committee).Tikabali has two bus stand one is in the center of the village and predominantly that is for private buses and another one is near govt medical that's mainly for govt buses.

A 30-bed Community Health Center is the only health centre for the highly Malaria-prone locality. People from nearby blocks like Chakapada, Udayagiri, and Raikia used to depend on this hospital for the services of its doctors and staff.

== Education ==
D.I.E.T, A.M.C.S. College, Govt. High School and few Primary Schools are some educational institutions in the location. There is only one English Medium School namely Kalinga Sisu Bihar Seva English Medium School. Saraswati Shishu Mandir also provides educational services in this town. Inhabitants of this village want their children to be educated irrespective of gender. Girls are also given equal priority like boys. Many students of Tikabali High School are doing well in their academics and are pursuing MBBS, engineering, and agricultural research in government Universities all over India.

== Communication ==
This place is well connected by well maintained road service. A number of buses ply to and from Berhampur, Bhubaneswar and Phulbani via Tikabali. Recently theVijayawada-Ranchi corridor highway which passes through this town is completed. This has considerably improved road connectivity in the area.

== Tourism ==
Dungi is a nearby village where multiple temples of Lord Shiva are located. Another Shiva shrine, known as Birupakshya Temple, is situated at Chakapad. It is about 19 kilometres from Tikabali. With united efforts the inhabitants of Tikabali have constructed a Jagannath temple in the heart of the town. This temple is located on a scenic hill-top that overlooks the town. Religious clashes between some Hindu group and Converted Christians in the year 2008 earned some bad name to the village. However, collective efforts from both the communities has now restored peace in this area. The natural environment attracts tourists to Tikabali, especially during winter.
