= Murder of Lakshmanananda Saraswati =

- Kandhamal (Odisha)
- Location: 20.47°N 84.23°E; Kandhamal, Odisha
- Date: 23 August 2008
- Target: Lakshmanananda Saraswati
- Attack type: Murder
- Weapons: Ak-47 and revolvers
- Deaths: 5 (including Lakshmanananda Saraswati)
- Perpetrator: 8
- Assailants: 7 Christians and 1 Maoist leader

Lakshmanananda Saraswati (c. 1926 – 23 August 2008) and four of his disciples were murdered on 23 August 2008 in the state of Odisha in India. Saraswati was a leader of the Vishva Hindu Parishad, a subsidiary of the Rashtriya Swayamsevak Sangh, a right-wing Hindutva paramilitary organisation. His death, blamed on Christians, led to the 2008 Kandhamal violence.

== Murder ==
Saraswati was murdered on Janmashtami Day of 2008 while visiting with pupils at the Kanya Ashram (a residential girls' school) in Tumudibandh, about 100 km from Phulbani, the district headquarters of Kandhamal district. Four of his disciples, including a boy, were also killed by gunfire.

The Kanya Ashram housed 130 girls on the day of the Janmashtami festival and many of the girls were eyewitnesses to the killing, according to The Indian Express. A group of thirty to forty armed men surrounded the Ashram. Four of the assailants carried AK-47s and many others had locally made revolvers. Two of the four government-provided security guards had gone home to eat at the time of the attack; the assailants tied and gagged the two remaining guards.

== Civil disorder and riots ==
Hundreds of people gathered on the route to pay their last respects to Saraswati. Riots erupted when the procession passed through localities with Catholic populations. Catholics were targeted everywhere; in some places many Hindu families were also attacked because they were supporters of the Indian National Congress. The attackers included activists of the VHP, the Bajrang Dal, and other Sangh Parivar organisations, as well as members of the Bharatiya Janata Party, which was heading the government, led by Naveen Patnaik. The violence also saw attacks on Catholics who belonged to the Scheduled Castes and on people who claimed tribal status on the grounds that they spoke the Kui language of the Khond tribal people. The Kui Samaj, which unites members of the native Kondh tribe (both Hindus and Protestant Khonds) in Kandhamal, was allied with the attacking organisations of the Sangh Parivar.

== Investigations ==
The police arrested Pradesh Kumar Das, an employee of the Indian branch of World Vision, a Christian charity organisation, from Khadagpur while escaping from the district at Buguda. In another drive, two other persons, Vikram Digal and William Digal, were arrested from the house of Lal Digal, a local militant Catholic, from Nuasahi at Gunjibadi, Nuagaan. They have admitted to having joined a group of twenty-eight other assailants.

On 28 August 2008, a letter of denial, purportedly from the Kotagarha unit of the CPI-Maoist party was received by some news media and as well as the VHP office in the Gajapati district of Orissa and the Bajrang Dal. While the letter denied that the state central committee of the Maoists had approved the attack, it claimed that some Maoists may have been bribed by Pano Catholics to launch the attack. Maoist sympathisers of south Orissa also denied the role of CPI-Maoist in the murder that sparked off communal violence in the Kandhamnal district. Soon after the appearance of the aforementioned letter, Azad, a leader of the Maoist People's Liberation Guerrilla Army, claimed responsibility for the murder of Lakshmanananda. Azad was suspected by the police of leading the attack himself. On 9 September 2008 the Maoists, who work underground, made an official press release claiming responsibility for the killing of Saraswati. Communist Party of India (Maoist) leader Sabyasachi Panda claimed that they killed Saraswati and four of his disciples at his Jalespeta ashram on 23 August. In March 2009 police arrested Central Committee and Politburo member of CPI (Maoist), Ashutosh Tudu for the attack.

Reconstructing the final moments of the killing of VHP leader Laxmanananda Saraswati and his four disciples in Kandhamal's Jalespeta ashram in August 2008, Orissa police said that a Maoist who surrendered that week claimed there were four policemen at the ashram but they fled when the Maoists announced that they had come looking for the Saraswati. Four of the six Maoists who carried out the attack were from Chhattisgarh, the police were told. Rayagada SP Ashis Kumar Singh said Surendra Brekwada (alias "Dasu"), who surrendered with his wife Ruppi Pidikka (alias "Jaya"), told them that a six-member "crack team" of the Maoists, led by Orissa CPI (Maoist) leader Azad – alias Duna Keshav Rao – reached Jalespeta ashram on 23 August evening and came across four lathi-wielding policemen. Brekwada, a sharpshooter, was one of the six who allegedly killed the 82-year-old Saraswati, Kishore Baba (aged 45), Amritananda Baba (62), Mata Bhaktimayee (40) and Puranjan Ganthi (28), brother of one of the girl inmates of the tribal residential school.

In spite of claims that the case of Saraswatiji's murder has been solved, it is widely believed to be a cover up, based on doubts expressed by several senior investigators and experts on left-wing extremism.

== Convictions ==
On 30 September 2013, Additional district judge Rajendra Kumar Tosh at an Additional district and sessions court in Phulbani convicted seven Pano Catholics for the murder: Gadanath Chalanseth, Bijaya Kumar Shyamseth, Buddha Nayak, Sanatan Badamajhi, Duryadhan Sunamajhi, Bhaskar Sunamajhi and Munda Badamajhi.

Six days later the same court set free five accused who were being tried for burning of a Catholic house in the riots following the murder. Sajan George, president of Global Council of Indian Christians alleged that the court is biased against the Dalit Catholic minority. The defence lawyer, S. K. Padhi said that the ruling would be appealed in the Odisha High Court.

== See also ==
- Graham Staines
