= Dangaria Kandha =

Tribal community in Odisha, India

Dangaria Kondha
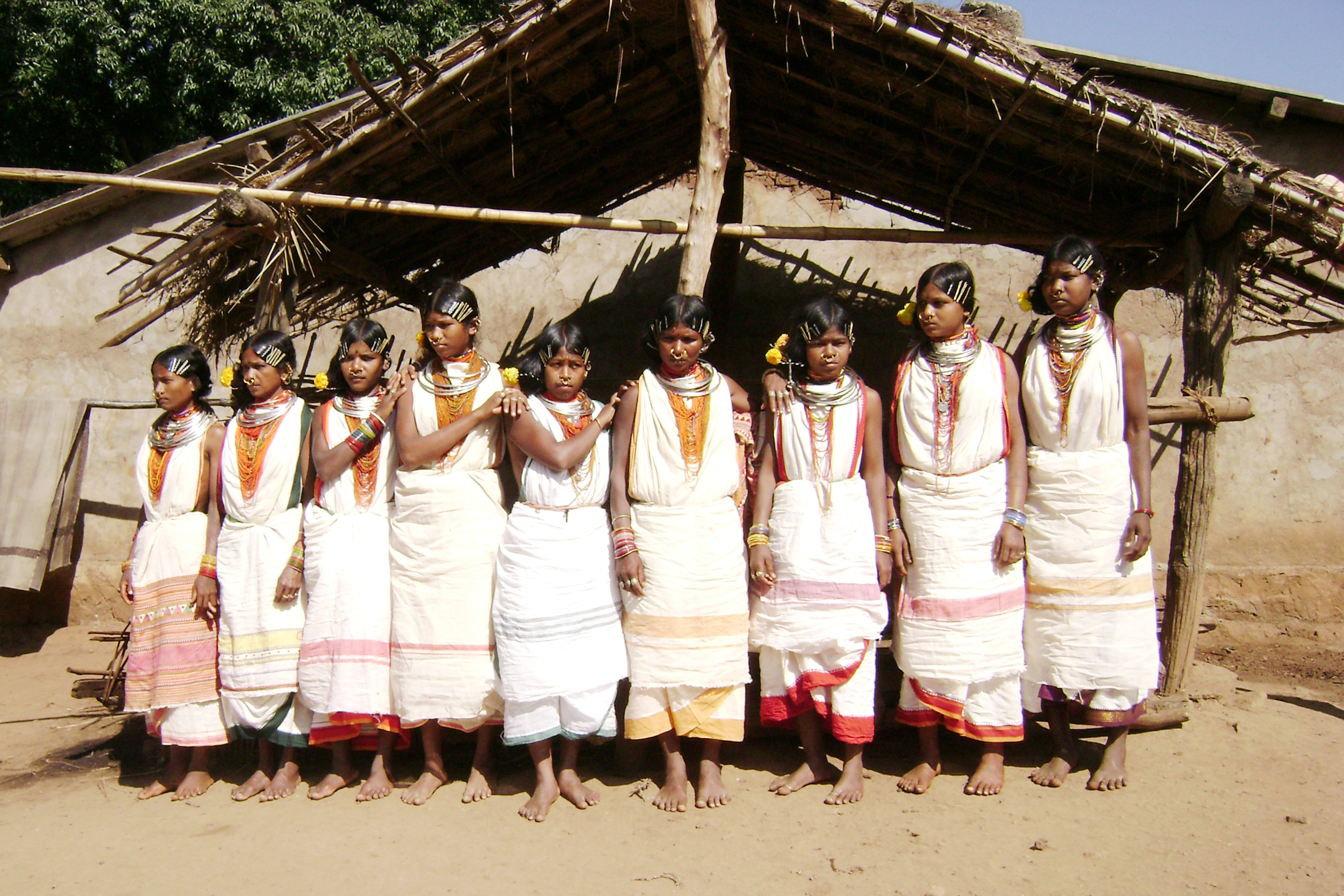

Total population
- 8,848 (2011)

Regions with significant populations
- Odisha: Rayagada district and Kalahandi district

Languages
- Kui language

Religion
- Animism

Related ethnic groups
- Dravidian people • Khonds • Gondi people

The Dangaria Kandha (Odia: [ɖɔŋɡɔɾia kɔn̪d̪ʰɔ]) people are members of the Kondhs. They are located in the Niyamgiri hills in the state of Odisha (formerly Orissa) in India. They sustain themselves from the resources of the Niyamgiri forests, practising horticulture and shifting cultivation. They have been at the centre of a dispute over mining rights in the area.

== Topography ==
Niyamgiri is a hill range spread over 250 km^{2} which falls under the Rayagada and Kalahandi District in south-west Odisha, India. It is an area containing densely forested hills, deep gorges and cascading streams. Its highest point is the mountain known as Niyamgiri or Niyam Dongar, at a height of 1,306m.

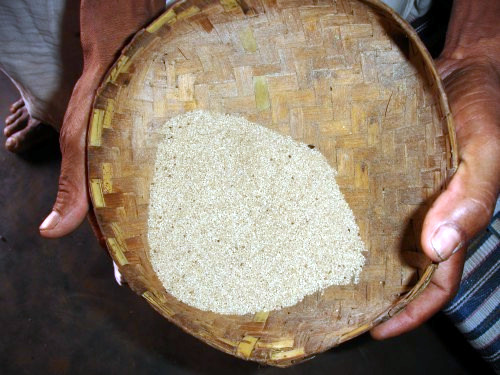
Traditional medicinal rice of Niyamgiri Hills

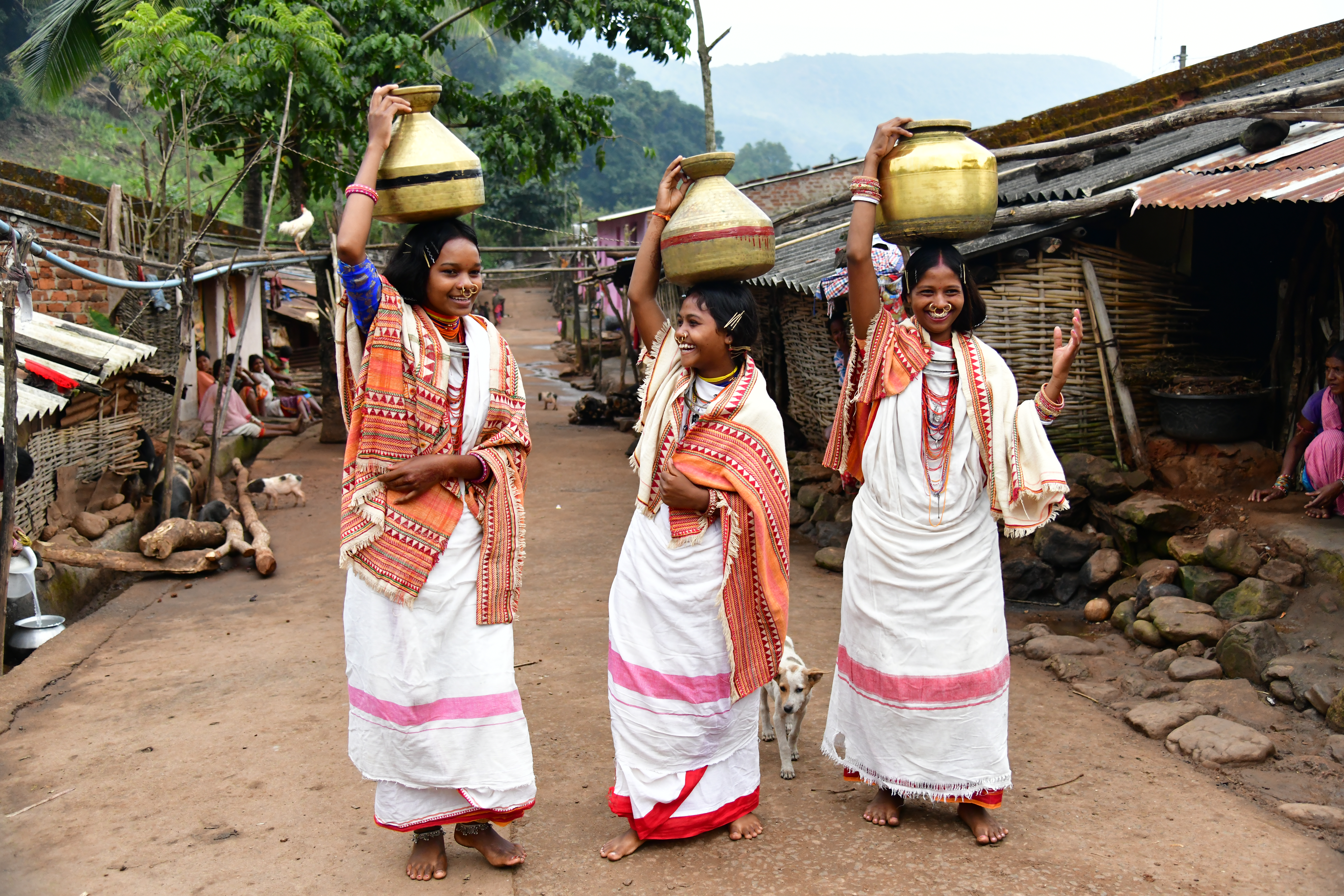
Dongria Kondh women

== Society ==
The Dongria Kondh community numbers approximately 8,000 people, inhabiting about 100 villages. The social structure among the community is adapted to the surroundings of Niyamgiri forested hill country, where they have lived for many generations.

=== Nomenclature ===
The Dongria Kondh derive their name from dongar, meaning ‘agricultural land on hill slopes’, and the name for themselves is Jharnia – "protector of streams".

=== Language ===
The people of Niyamgiri use Kui language. Kui language is not written, but it is spoken among the people of Kondh community.

=== Beliefs ===
The Dangaria Kandha worship Niyam Raja (Niyamraja), the supreme god of the Niyamgiri jungle, believing that Niyam Raja is the source of their essential resources. The deep reverence and respect that the Dongria have for their gods, hills, and streams pervades every aspect of their lives. Even their art reflects the mountains, in the triangular designs found on village shrines to the many gods of the village, farm and forests and their leader, Niyam Raja.

=== Division of clan ===
The traditional Dongria Kondh society has always been based on a tightened family structure involving people from different generations and these were marked by geographically demarcated clans where each clan was identified by a male animal name. The identification of clan is further classified by surname basis where the surname of the eldest male member of the most powerful family of the clan is generally used to denote that particular clan. This system of classification of clans within the Dongria Kondh community is a process of clan division which is also similar to Native American society where there was a presence of dispersed clan distribution throughout the land.

According to anthropologist Robert H. Winthrop, these types of clans are formed without any kind of hierarchy where a complete egalitarian system is created by crosscutting any kind of social affiliation. This culture of clan division is undoubtedly an integrated system and primarily has its allegiance with the “Kondh Pradhan". The Kondh community in the Niyamgiri hills is organized into many clans from which thirty-six clans are clearly identifiable where each clan possess their own customary territories which is locally also known as padars (consisting several hills). The Dongria Kondh people have more than 300 settlements or hamlets within their clan territory which is also not a permanent establishment rather these communities abandon the other communities in search of new ones within their own habitat region. The reason behind abandoning their houses can be because of practising of slash and burn agriculture also locally known as podu in which they leave one piece of land and move to another for further agricultural purposes.

=== Social customs and political structure ===
The socio-political governing and decision-making body of the Dongria Kondh community is also known as the Kutumba. To make the work of the then divided into two groups one which functions at the level of clan or Kuda Kutumba and one at the level of settlement or Nayu Kutumba. The management of each clan is then done according to a more root level division, in which a separate group of people are dedicated to address the religious and political matters of the Dongria Kondh hence four functional groups or punjas are formed. The punjas of the Dongria Kondhs are jani, pujari, bismajhi and mandal. The kuda kutumba presides over the matha mandal which manages the affairs of a particular clan in a cluster of villages. It presides and solves disputes related to inter-ethnic and inter-religious groups. The Dongria Kondh have adopted a system of imparting cultural and traditional values to the adolescents and youths in their villages through exclusive youth dormitories. The Dongria women are also given equal status in the society in matters such as widow remarriage, possessing property without the interference of their husbands and sons.

=== Marriage customs ===
The Dongria Kondh family structure depends on which clan the person belongs to as clan exogamy is practised in this community which according to some people is a process of incest taboo prevalent among these communities in its customs. These exogamous clan group have resulted in existence of dominant clan groups which was due to a process of marriage and kinship which formed during a long period of time.

== Mining dispute ==
In 1997 Sterlite Industries, a part of the Vedanta Resources group, put forward proposals to construct an aluminium refinery at the nearby location of Lanjigarh and to extract bauxite from the Niyamgiri Hills as feedstock for the refinery, as a joint venture with the state-owned Orissa Mining Corporation. The refinery opened in 2006, but the mining development was held up by legal action, and it was found that the construction of the refinery had broken laws relating to environmental protection and local people's rights. The company argued that mining on Niyamgiri should proceed, as it would enable aluminium to be produced more economically than bringing in raw materials from greater distances. There was considerable opposition among the Dongria Kondh, and campaigners against the scheme, including the Wildlife Institute of India, maintained that it would cause damage to the environment and disrupt the way of life of the local people. The company repudiated the environmental claims and said that it was improving the local economy and providing new facilities. The campaign against the mining proposals gathered support from Survival International and individuals including Arundhati Roy, Michael Palin, Bianca Jagger and Joanna Lumley.

The mining development was placed on hold by the Government of India in 2010, with a statement that the company had flouted the law and disregarded the rights of the Dongria Kondh. In 2013 the Supreme Court of India ordered the Odisha Government to consult the local tribespeople, citing the protection afforded to the rights of tribal and forest groups under the Forest Rights Act 2006. Twelve Dongria Kondh village councils were consulted and all rejected the mining proposals. In January 2014 the Indian Ministry of Environment, Forest and Climate Change announced that it was refusing clearance for the mine. The state government of Odisha has since unsuccessfully sought permission from the Supreme Court to restart the scheme.

== In fiction ==
In 2010 Survival International placed an advertisement in Variety magazine drawing attention to similarities between the scenario of James Cameron's film Avatar and the situation of the Dongria Kondh.

== Gallery ==
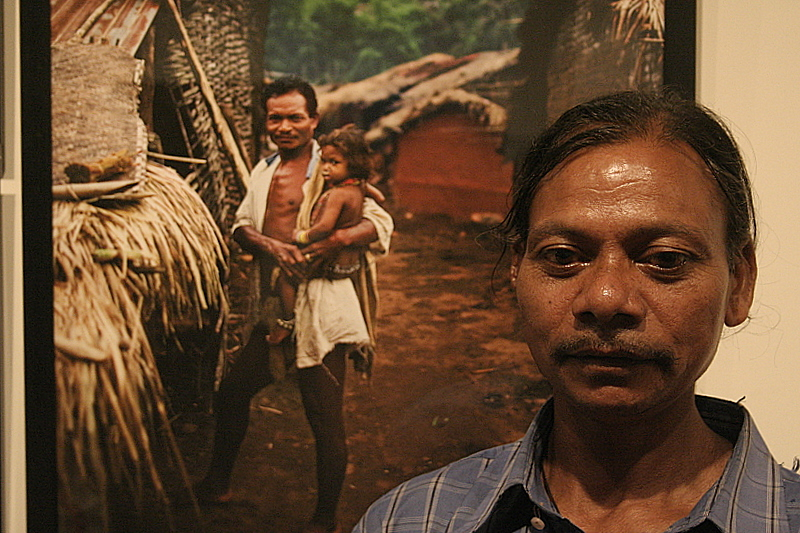
Portrait of Kondh Male

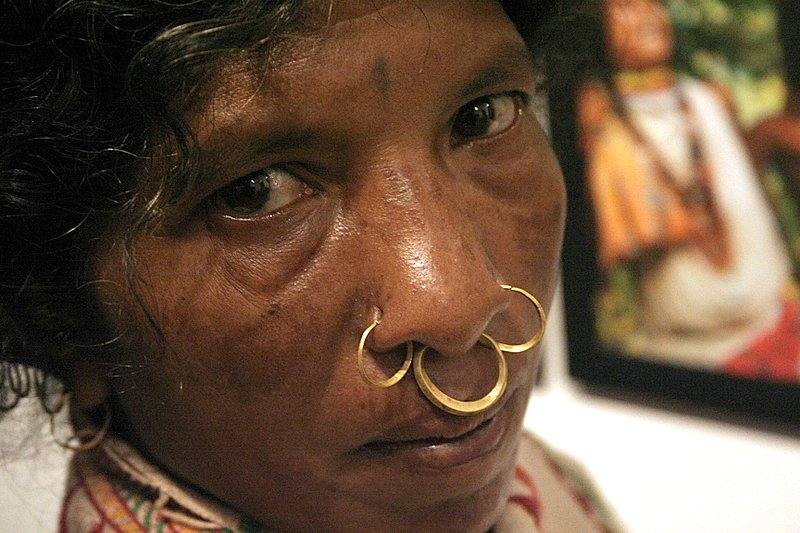
Portrait of Kondh Tribal Woman

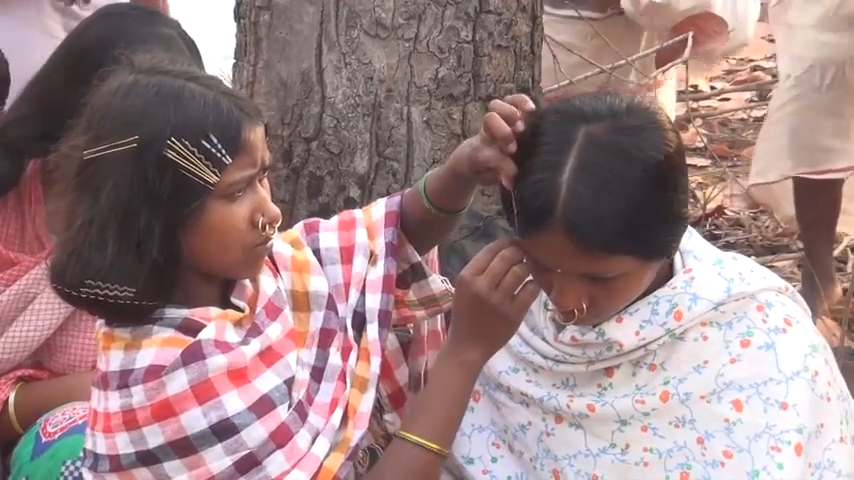
Dongria woman wearing hair clips

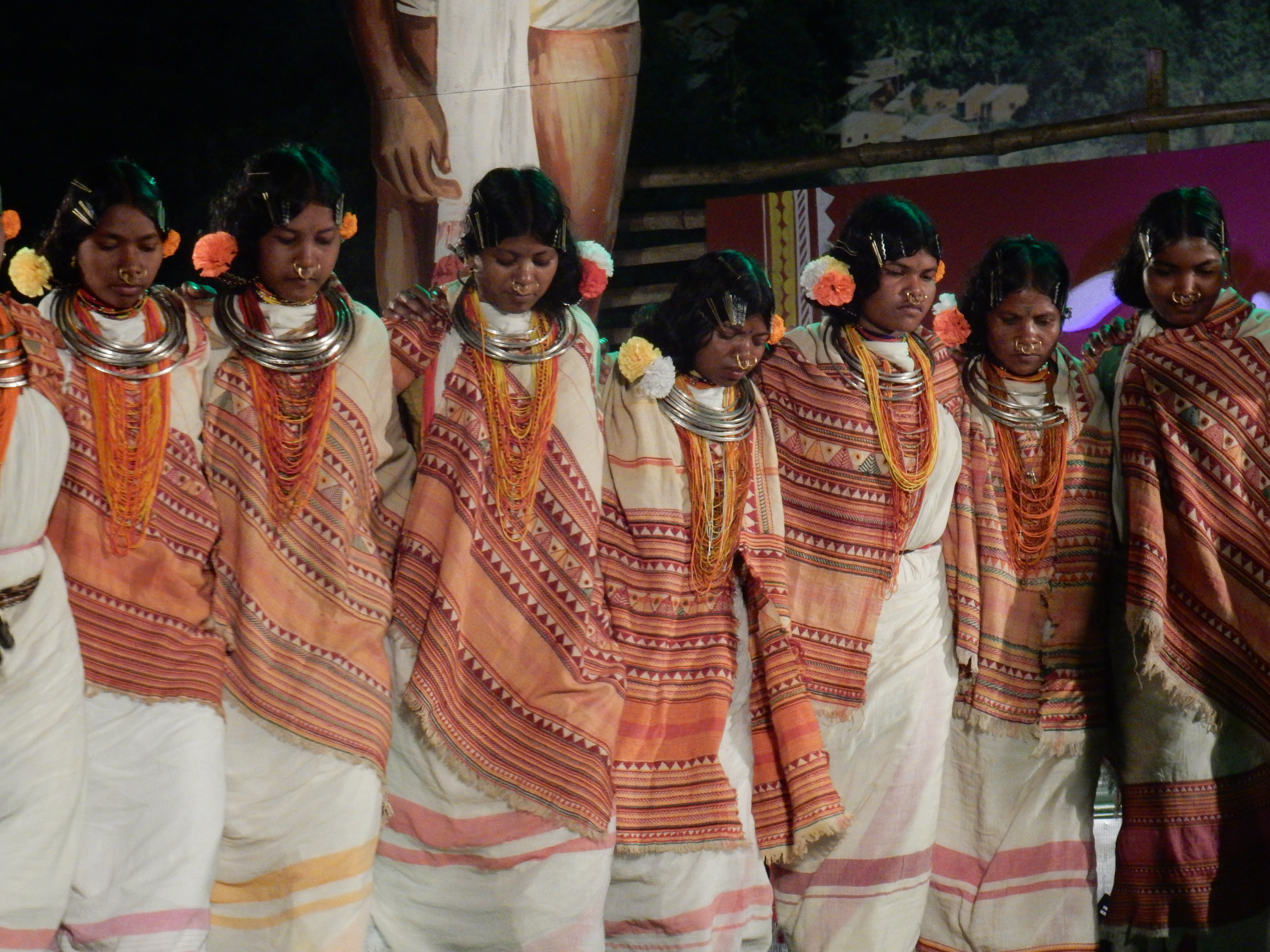
Dongria Kondh dance

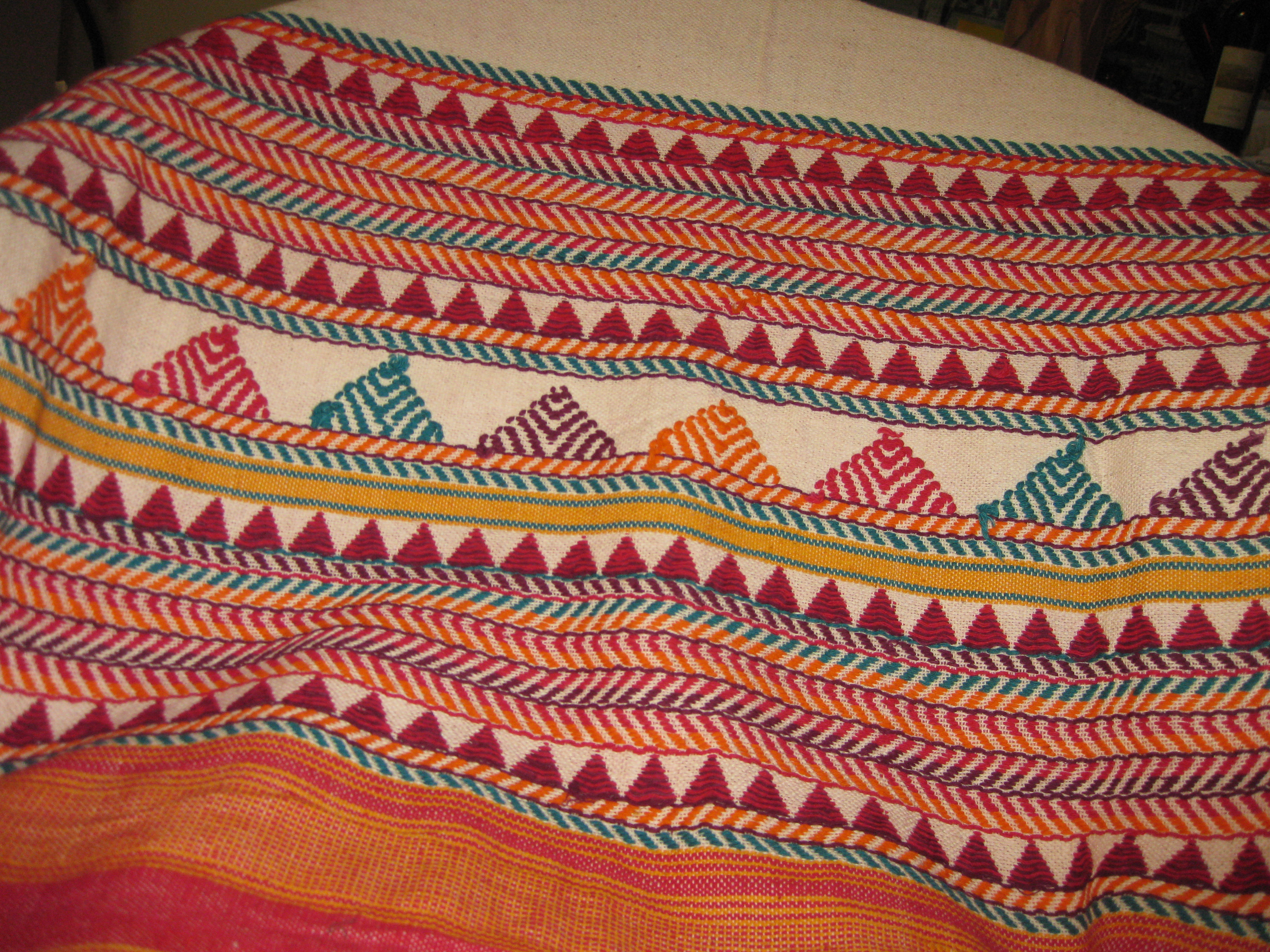
Kapdaganda shawl

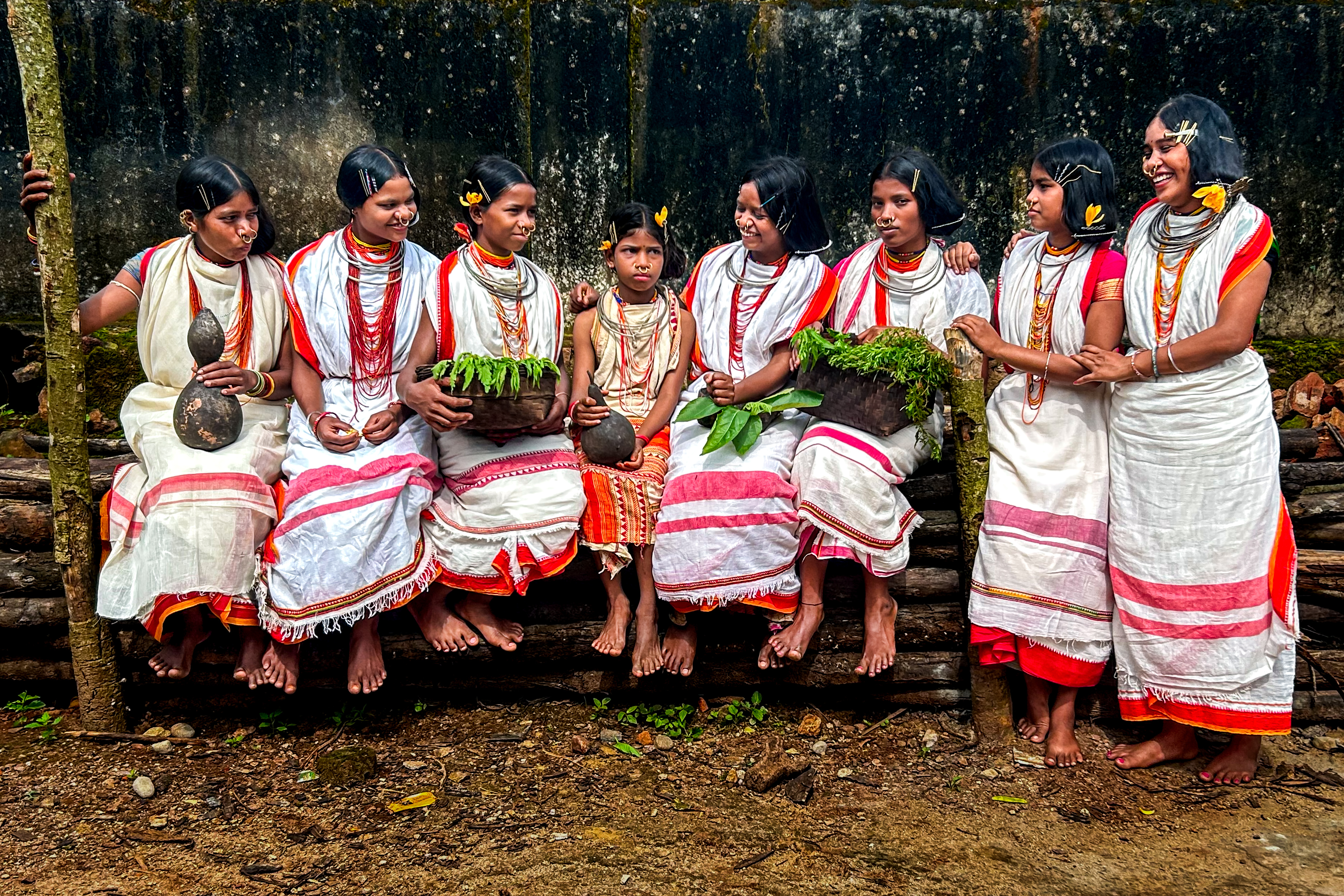

== See also ==
- Orissa Mining Corporation v. Ministry of Environment & Forest & Others
