= Khond people =

Tribal community in India

Khonds
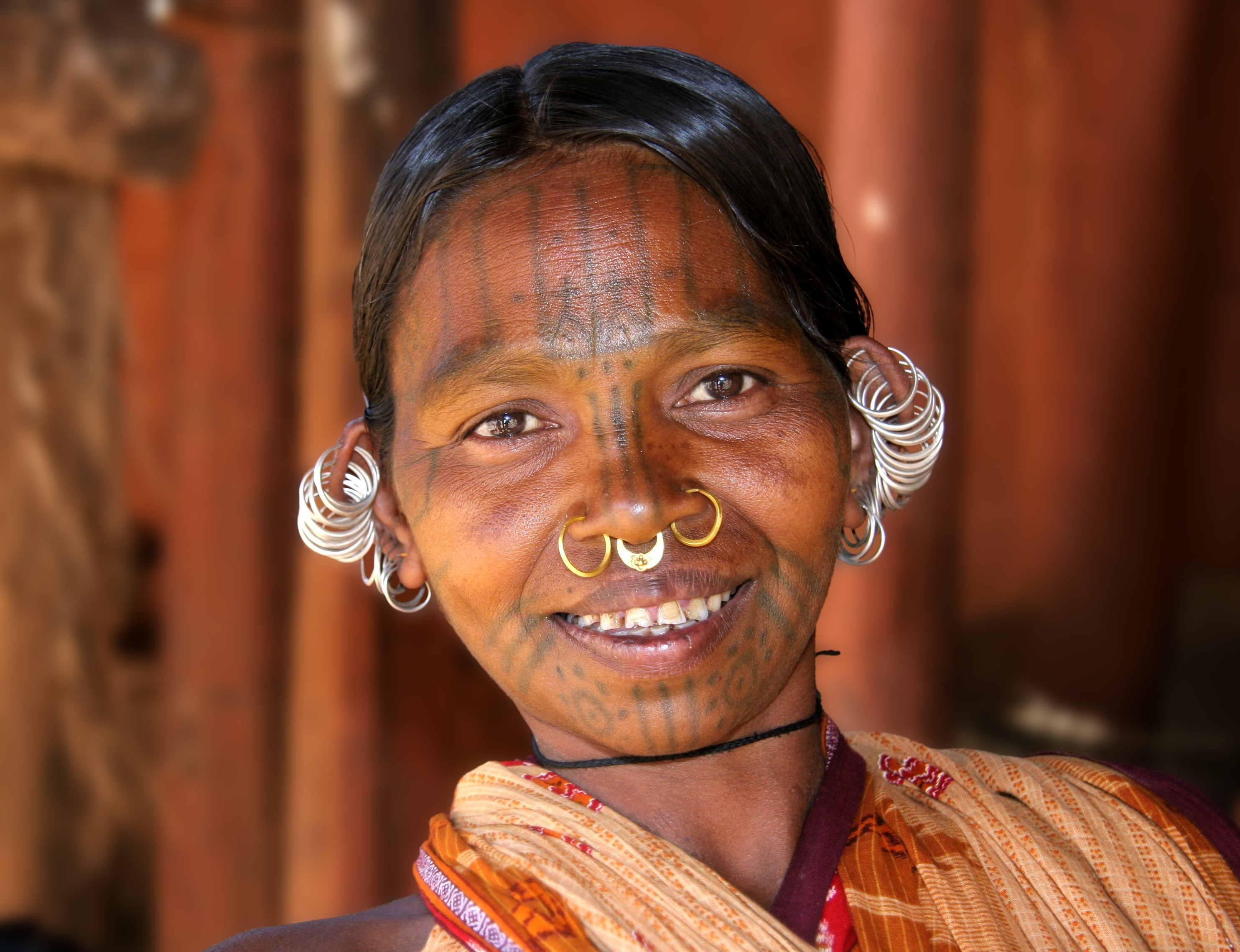
- A Khond woman in Odisha

Total population
- c. 1.74 million (2011)

Regions with significant populations
- India • Bangladesh
- Odisha: 1,627,486
- Andhra Pradesh (incl. Telangana): 103,290
- Chhattisgarh: 10,991
- Assam: 9,936 (1951 est.)
- Bangladesh: 1,898

Languages
- Kui, Kuvi, Odia

Religion
- Majority:-: Hinduism • Christianity; Minority:- Islam • other

Related ethnic groups
- Dravidian people • Dangaria Kandha • Gondi people

Khonds (also spelt Kondha and Kandha; Odia: kôndhô, IPA: [kɔn̪d̪ʰɔ]) are a Dravidian ethnic group and indigenous tribal community in India. Traditionally subsistence farmers, they are divided into the hill-dwelling Khonds and plain-dwelling Khonds for census purposes, but the Khonds themselves identify by their specific clans. Khonds usually hold large tracts of fertile land, but still practice hunting, gathering, and slash-and-burn agriculture in the forests as a symbol of their connection to, and as an assertion of their ownership of the forests wherein they dwell. Khonds speak the Kui language and write it in the Odia script.

The Khonds are the largest tribal group in the state of Odisha. They are known for their rich cultural heritage, valorous martial traditions, and indigenous values, which center on harmony with nature. The Kandhamal district in Odisha has a fifty-five per cent Khond population, and is named after the tribe they revolted against the Britishers in 1846 due to the fear of being annexed.

Distribution of Khond/Kondh tribe in India, 2011 census

They have designated Scheduled Tribe status in eight states: Andhra Pradesh, Bihar, Chhattisgarh, Madhya Pradesh, Maharashtra, Odisha, Jharkhand, and West Bengal, with a population of 1,743,406 in the 2011 census. Of these, 93.35% reside in Odisha, 5.92% in Andhra Pradesh, and around 10,000 in Chhattisgarh, while in other states, their numbers are below one thousand. In addition to these scheduled states, they are also found in northeastern India, particularly in Assam, where their population was estimated at 9,936 in the 1951 census, primarily working as tea garden workers. In Bangladesh, their population was 1,898 in the 2022 census.

== Language ==
The Khonds speak Kui and Kuvi as their native languages. They are most closely related to the Gondi language. Both are Dravidian languages and are written with the Odia script.

== Society ==
The Khonds are adept land dwellers of the forest and hill environment. However, due to development interventions in education, medical facilities, irrigation, plantation, they have adapted to the modern way of life in many ways. Their traditional lifestyle, language, food habits, customary traits of economy, political organisation, norms, values, and world view have been drastically changed in recent times.

The traditional Khond society is based on geographically demarcated clans, each consisting of a large group of related families identified by a Totem, usually of a male wild animal. Each clan usually has a common surname and is led by the eldest male member of the most powerful family of the clan. All the clans of the Khonds owe allegiance to the "Kondh Pradhan", who is usually the leader of the most powerful clan of the Khonds.

The Khond family is often nuclear, although extended joint families are also found. Female family members are on equal social footing with the male members in Khond society, and they can inherit, own, hold, and dispose of property without reference to their parents, husband or sons. Women have the right to choose their husbands, and to seek divorce. However, the family is patrilineal and patrilocal. Remarriage is common for divorced or widowed women and men. Children are never considered illegitimate in Khond society and inherit the clan name of their biological or adoptive fathers with all the rights accruing to natural born children.

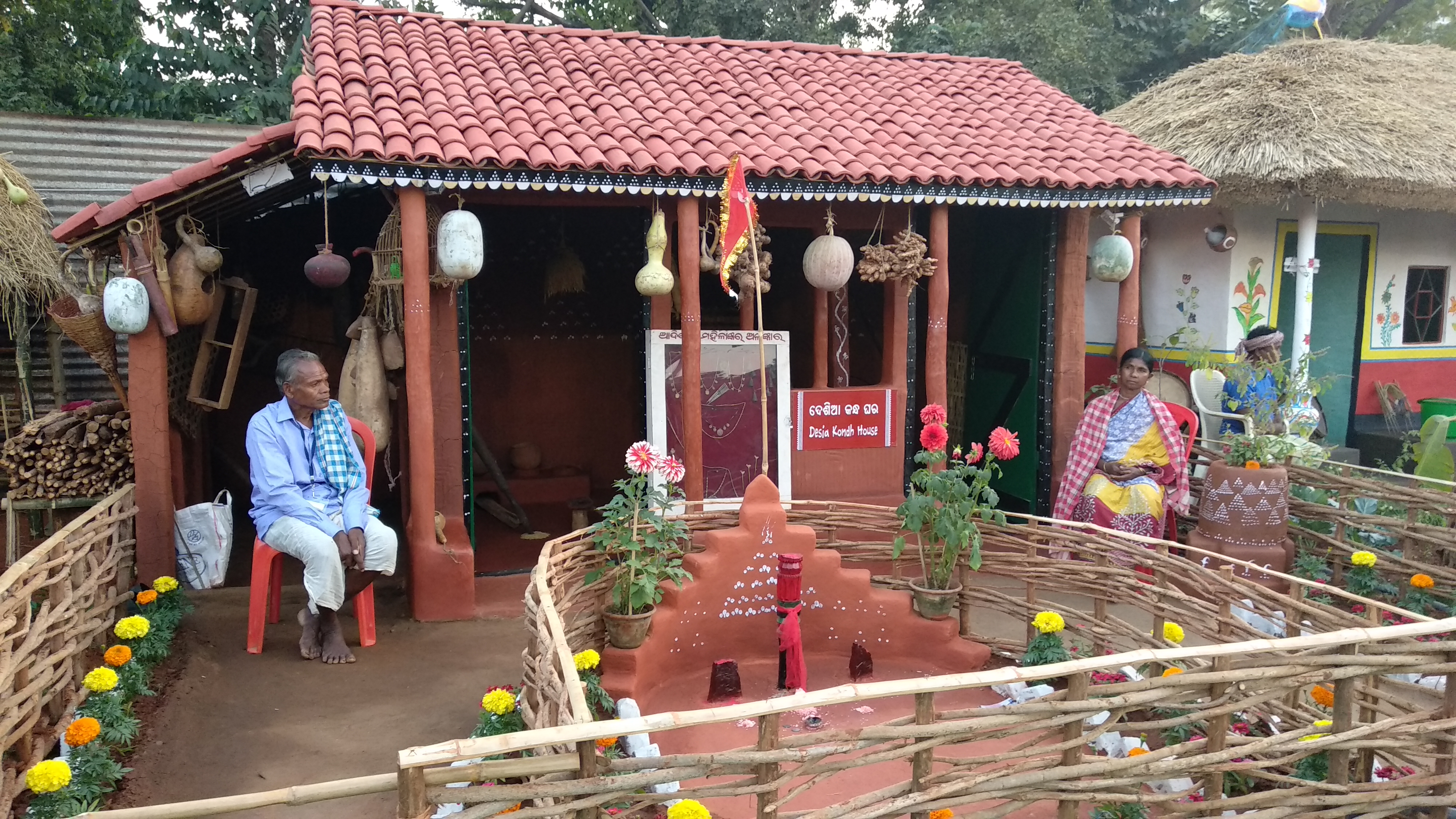
A traditional Khond house.

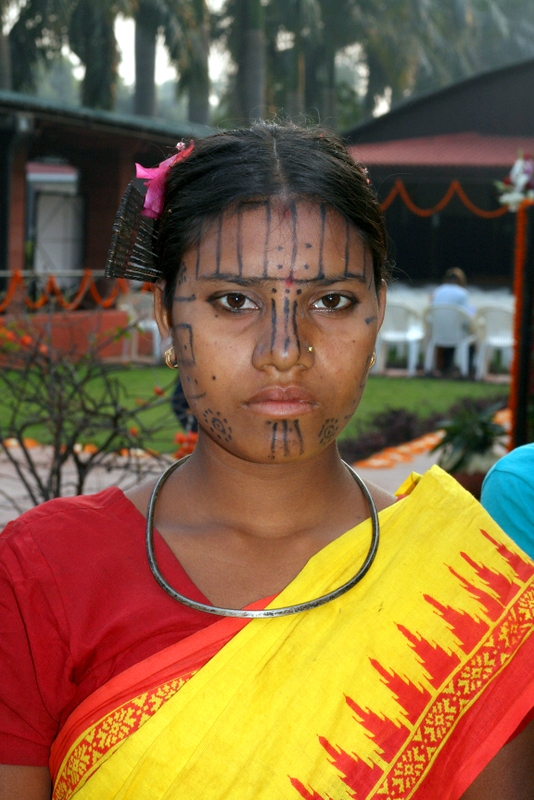
Khond Girl

The Kondhs have a dormitory for adolescent girls and boys which forms a part of their enculturation and education process. The girls and boys sleep at night in their respective dormitory and learn social taboos, myths, legends, stories, riddles, proverbs amidst singing and dancing the whole night, thus learning the way of the tribe. The girls are usually instructed in good housekeeping and in ways to bring up good children while the boys learn the art of hunting and the legends of their brave and martial ancestors.

Bravery and skill in hunting determine the respect that a man gets in the Khond tribe. A large number of Khonds were recruited by the British during the First and Second World Wars and were prized as natural jungle warfare experts and fierce warriors. Even today a large proportion of the Khond men join the State police or Armed Forces of India to seek an opportunity to prove their bravery. Modern education has facilitated the entry of a large number of Khonds into Government Civil Service, and adaptation to modern life has ensured that the tribe is one of the most politically dominant in Odisha.

The men usually forage or hunt in the forests. They also practice the podu system of shifting cultivation on the hill slopes where they grow different varieties of rice, lentils and vegetables. Women usually do all the household work from fetching water from the distant streams, cooking, serving food to each member of the household to assisting the men in cultivation, harvesting and sale of produce in the market.

The Khond commonly practice clan exogamy. By custom, marriage must cross clan boundaries (a form of incest taboo). The clan is strictly exogamous, which means marriages are made outside the clan (yet still within the greater Khond population). The form of acquiring mate is often by negotiation. However, marriage by capture or elopement is also rarely practiced. For marriage bride price is paid to the parents of the bride by the groom, which is a striking feature of the Khonds. The bride price was traditionally paid in tiger pelts though now land or gold sovereigns are the usual mode of payment of bride price.

== Religion ==
Religion among Khond/Kondh people of eight scheduled states of India.
1. Hinduism (90.2%)
2. Christianity (9.28%)
3. Muslim (0.16%)
4. Other (0.37%)

According to the 2011 census, the Khond population of eight states accounts for 1,743,406 individuals. Among them, 90.19% are Hindu, 9.28% are Christian, while 2,578 are Muslim, 437 are Buddhist, 181 are Sikh, 89 are Jain, 3,151 follow other religions (primarily Nature worship), and 2,578 did not state any religious affiliation.

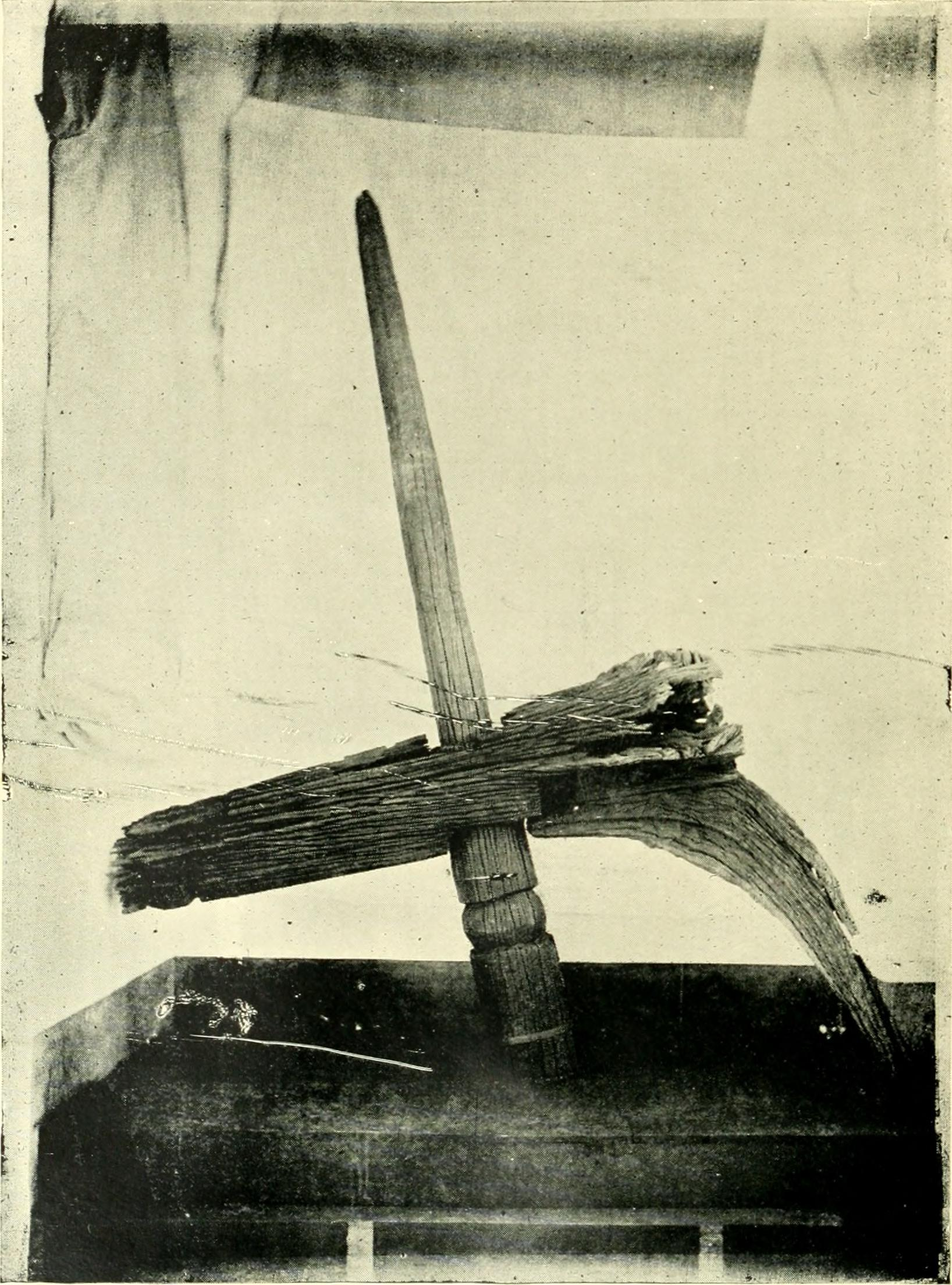
Meriah sacrifice post.

Traditionally the Khond religious beliefs were syncretic combining totemism, animism, ancestor worship, shamanism and nature worship. British writers also note that the Khonds practiced human sacrifice. Traditional Khond religion involved the worship mountains, Rivers, Sun, Earth. Baredi is place of worship. Traditional Khond religion involved different rituals such as Jhagadi or Kedu or Meriah Puja, Sru Penu Puja, Dharni Penu Puja, Guruba Penu Puja, Turki Penu Puja, and Pitabali Puja. Matiguru involved worship of earth through before sowing seeds. Other rituals connected with land fertility were 'Guruba Puja', 'Turki Puja' and in some cases 'Meriah Puja (human sacrifice)' to appease Dharni (earth). Saru penu puja involved the sacrifice of fowls and feast. In Dehuri sacrifice goat and chicken were sacrificed. Gurba Penu Puja and Turki penu puja performed outside the village. Pitabali Puja was performed by offering flowers, fruits, sandal paste, incense, ghee-lamps, ghee, sundried rice, turmeric, buffalo or a he-goat and fowl.

The Traditional Khond religion gave highest importance to the Earth goddess, who is held to be the creator and sustainer of the world. The gender of the deity changed to male and became Dharni Deota. His companion is Bhatbarsi Deota, the hunting god. To them once a year a buffalo was sacrificed. Before hunting they would worship the spirit of the hills and valleys they would hunt in lest they hide the animals the hunter wished to catch.

In Traditional Khond religion, a breach of accepted religious conduct by any member of their society invited the wrath of spirits in the form of lack of rain fall, soaking of streams, destruction of forest produce, and other natural calamities. Hence, the customary laws, norms, taboos, and values were greatly adhered to and enforced with high to heavy punishments, depending upon the seriousness of the crimes committed. The practice of traditional Khond religion has practically become extinct today.

Extended contact with the Oriya speaking Hindus made Khonds to adopt many aspects of Hinduism and Hindu culture. The contact with the Hindus led the Khonds to adopt Hindu deities into their pantheon and rituals. For example, the Kali and Durga are worshiped as manifestations of Dharani, but always with the sacrifice of buffaloes, goats, or fowl. Similarly, Shiva is worshipped as a manifestation of Bhatbarsi Deota with tribal rituals not seen in Hinduism. Jagannath, Ram, Krishna and Balram are other popular deities who have been "tribalised" in Khond adaptation of Hinduism.

Many Khonds converted to Protestant Christianity in the late nineteenth and early twentieth century due to the efforts of the missionaries of the Serampore Mission. The influence of Khond traditional beliefs on Christianity can be seen in some rituals such as those associated with Easter and resurrection when ancestors are also venerated and given offerings, although the church officially rejects the traditional beliefs as pagan. Many Khonds have also converted to Islam and a great diversity of religious practices can be seen among the members of the tribe. There is widespread religious diversity within the tribe, and often within the same family. However, the Khond tribal identity and affiliation predominates the social and ethical culture far more than individual religious faith.

Significantly, as with many indigenous peoples, the conceptual worldview of the natural environment and its sacredness subscribed to by the Khond reinforce the social and cultural practices that define the tribe. Here, the sacredness of the earth perpetuates tribal socio-ethics, wherein harmony with nature and respect for ancestors is deeply embedded. This is in stark contrast to non tribal, materialistic, economics-centred, resource extractive worldview that may not prioritise the primacy of the land or acknowledge environment as a spiritual and cultural resource and thereby promote deforestation, strip-mining etc. for development projects. This divergence in worldviews of the Khonds with the Policy makers has led to a situation of conflict in many instances.

== Economy ==
They have an economy based on hunting and gathering, trapping game, collecting wild fruits, tubers and honey apart from subsistence agriculture i.e. shifting cultivation or slash-and-burn cultivation, locally called Podu. The Khonds are excellent fruit farmers. The most striking feature of the Khonds is that they have adapted to horticulture and grow pineapple, oranges, turmeric, ginger and papaya in plenty. Forest fruit trees like mango and jackfruit, Mahua, Guava, Tendu and Custard apples are collected, which fulfill the major dietary chunk of the Khonds. Besides, the Khonds practice shifting cultivation, or podu chasa as it is locally called, as part of agriculture for growing lentils, beans and millets retaining the most primitive features of agricultural underdevelopment. Millets and beans along with game and fish form the staple diet of the Khonds. A dietary shift from millets to carbohydrate-rich, processed foods has led to obesity and diabetes among tribals. Turmeric grown in the Kandhamal district by the Khonds is a registered Geographical Indication product.

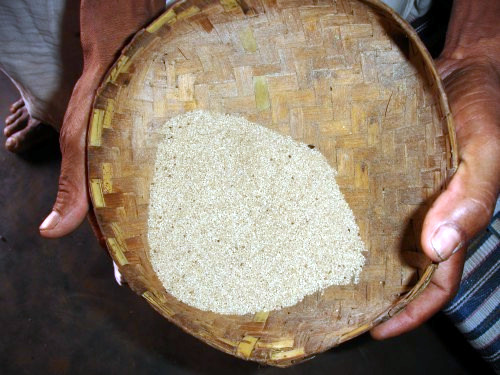
Traditional Rice cultivar of Khonds

The Khonds grow several native cultivars of fragrant and coloured rice. Parboiled rice is preferred as a staple.

They go out for collective hunts as well collect the seasonal fruits and roots in the forest. They usually cook food with oil extracted from sal and mahua seeds. They also use medicinal plants. These practices make them mainly dependent on forest resources for survival. The Khonds smoke fish and meat for preservation.

== Uprisings ==
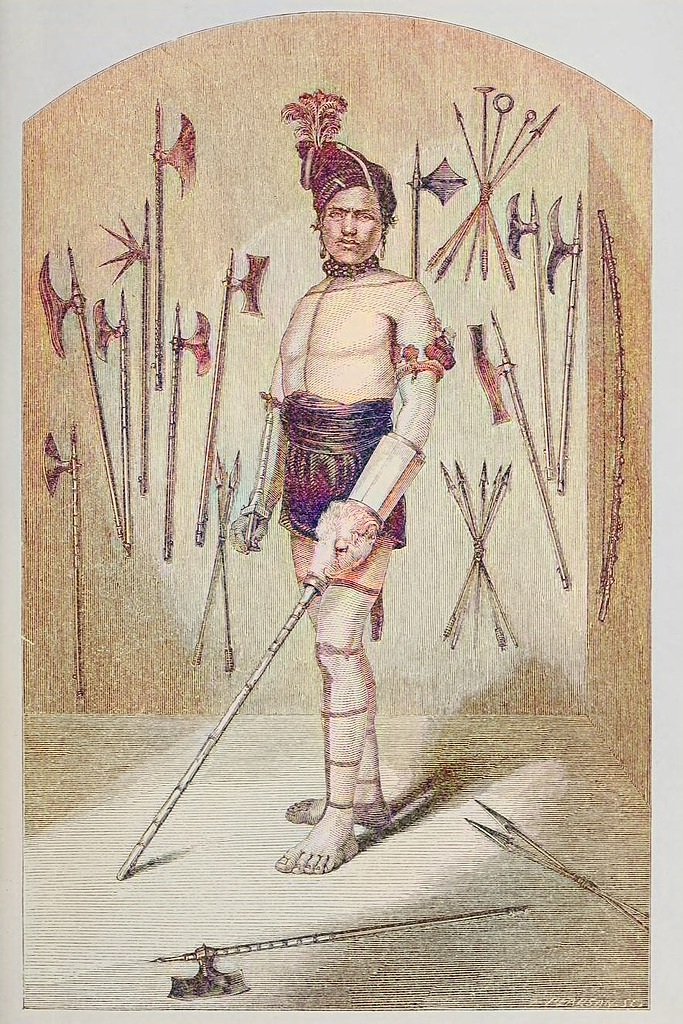
Kandha (Khond) Chief with weapons from 1864

The Khonds maintained a formidable reputation that involved multiple revolts. From 1753 to 1856 in the century long Ghumsar uprising the Khonds rebelled against the rule of the East India Company and carried out sustained guerrilla warfare as well as pitched combat against the British.

== Social and environmental concerns ==
The Dongria clan of Khonds inhabit the steep slopes of the Niyamgiri Range of Rayagada district and over the border into Kalahandi. They work entirely on the steep slopes for their livelihood. Vedanta Resources, a UK-based mining company, threatened the future of homeland of the Dongria Khonds clan of this tribe who reside in the Niyamgiri Hills which has rich deposits of bauxite. The bauxite mining also threatened the source and potability of the perennial streams in the Niyamgiri Hills.

The tribe's plight was the subject of a Survival International short film narrated by actress Joanna Lumley. In 2010 India's environment ministry ordered Vedanta Resources to halt a sixfold expansion of an aluminium refinery in Odisha. As part of its Demand Dignity campaign, in 2011 Amnesty International published a report concerning the rights of the Dongria Kondh.

Celebrities backing the campaign included Arundhati Roy (the Booker prize-winning author), as well as the British actors Joanna Lumley and Michael Palin.

In April 2013, the Supreme Court in a landmark decision, Orissa Mining Corporation Ltd vs Ministry Of Environment & Forest dated 18 April 2013, upheld the ban on Vedanta's project in the Niyamgiri Hills, ruling that development projects can not be at the cost of constitutional, fundamental cultural and religious rights of the Khonds and directed that the consent of the Khond community affected by the Vedanta project must be obtained prior to commencement.

The Khonds voted against the project in August 2013, and in January 2014 the Ministry for Environment and Forests stopped the Vedanta project.

The Niyamgiri movement and the resultant decision of the Supreme Court is considered a major milestone in indigenous rights jurisprudence in India.

== Communal unrest and insurgency ==
On 25 December 2007, ethnic conflict broke out between Khond tribals and Pano Scheduled Caste people in Kandhamals.

On 23 August 2008, Hindu ascetic Swami Lakshmanananda Saraswati (who was said to have worked among the Khond tribals for their educational upliftment) was murdered along with four others, including a boy, by a team of Maoist gunmen which allegedly included Catholic Panos. Maoist rebels took responsibility for the multiple murders. This led to large-scale riots between the Kandha tribe and the Pano communities. The underlying causes are complex, and cross political and religious boundaries. Land encroachment, perceived or otherwise, was the main source of tension between the Khond and Pano communities. It was widely believed by the Khonds that Panos were purchasing tribal land by forged documents wherein they were shown to be Khonds. The clash was predominantly ethnic, as both Hindu Kondhs and Protestant Christian Kondhs were on the same side, fighting against Catholic and Hindu Panos.

Later the conflict assumed communal overtones, as it was projected by western media to be a persecution of "Christian Minorities" rather than an ethnic conflict for land resources.

In April 2010, a special "fast track" court in Phulbani convicted 105 people. Ten people were acquitted due to lack of evidence.

Kandhamal district is currently a part of the Red Corridor of India, an area with significant Maoist insurgency activity. Suspected Maoist rebels detonated a roadside land mine on 27 November 2010, blowing up an ambulance. A patient, a paramedic, and the vehicle's driver were killed.

== See also ==
- Kandhamal, district
- Naxalite-Maoist Insurgency in India Red Corridor
- Lakshmanananda Saraswati
