= Kui language (India) =

Dravidian language spoken in Eastern India

Kui
- Kanda, Kandha, Khond, Khondi, Khondo, Kodu, Kodulu, Kuinga, Kuy
- କୁଈ
- The word Kui written in Kui Gaari script (above) and Odia script (below)
- Pronunciation: [kuiː]
- Native to: India
- Region: Odisha
- Ethnicity: Khonds, Dal, Sitha Kandha
- Native speakers: 941,000 (2011 census)
- Language family: Dravidian: South-Central; Konda–Kui; Kui–Kuvi; Kui
- Writing system: Odia script Odia Braille; Kui Gaari

Language codes
- ISO 639-3: Either: uki – Kui (standard) dwk – Dawik Kui
- Glottolog: kuii1252
- ELP: Kui (India)
- Languages in Odisha Kui language

- Kui is classified as Vulnerable by the UNESCO Atlas of the World's Languages in Danger

The Kui Gaari script constructed for the Kui language between 1982-83 by Dayanidhi Malik.

Kui (IPA: [kuiː], also Kand(h)a, Khond(i/o), Kanda, Kodu(lu) (Kōdu), Kuinga (Kūinga), Kuy) is a South-Central Dravidian language spoken by the Kandhas, eastern Indian state of Odisha. It is mostly spoken in Odisha, and written in the Odia script. With 941,988 registered native speakers, it figures at rank 29 in the 1991 Indian census.

== Grammar ==
=== Noun classes ===
Nouns are divided into four classes: substantive, agentive, verbal, and verb-derived nouns. Substantive nouns refer to "beings and inanimate objects".

Agentive nouns are based on a nominal or a verb, with suffixes added. These suffixes will either produce an 'appellative noun', including third-person pronouns and all other words that express a concrete expression of the root, or a 'relative participial noun', expressing the state or action expressed in the root and appearing concretely in the derived noun.

Verbal nouns are not to be confused with relative participial nouns. The former express the action of the verb as a noun; for example, gi 'do (root)' > gîva 'the act of doing'.

Derivative nouns are another class of nouns formed from verbal roots, but they retain a much broader relation to their verbal root than verbal or relative participial nouns do.

=== Noun gender ===
As in most other Dravidian languages, substantive nouns typically do not have inherent gender (for example, all non-human nouns do not), and thus will take a gender-marker before the noun. All females, animals, objects, ideas, and also deities thus may be said to take a neuter gender; the remaining nouns are masculine.

Gender markers	singular	plural
masculine	anju, ânju	aru, âru
neuter	ri, li	vi; i, u [rare]

Nevertheless there are still some traits of a specific female singular evident in Kui. These typically parallel others in the Dravidian family such as Malayalam or Tamil. The most common is ali (also âli), used in certain compounds which require it.

A very few noun-roots, like lâv- 'young person', do not take a feminine ending. Lâvenju means 'young man', but 'maiden' is lâ(v)a.

=== Numerals ===
roṇḍi	1	odgi	7
riṇḍi	2	âṭâ	8
munji	3	nohâ	9
nâlgi	4	dasâ	10
siṅgi	5	egâra	11
sajgi	6	bârâ	12

Higher numbers are formed in base twelve. For example:

- bârâ munji: 'three dozen' = 36
- pattôka (or bâro bârâ): 'twelve dozen' = 144
- ri pattu: 'two twelve dozen' = 288

== Phonology ==
=== Consonants ===
Consonants
		Labial	Dental	Retroflex	Palatal/ Postalv.	Velar	Glottal
Nasal		m	n	ɳ			
Plosive/ Affricate	voiceless	p	t	ʈ		k	
Plosive/ Affricate	voiced	b	d	ɖ	d͡ʒ	ɡ	
Lateral			l				
Fricative		v	s		ʃ ~ ç^{?}		h
Flap			ɾ	ɽ			

The fricative phoneme marked as /ʃ ~ ç/ is noted as 'palatal s', distinguishing it from 'sibilant s', and written in the source table as simply ⟨s⟩. The true value of this sound is unclear.

=== Vowels ===
Kui language has five short vowels, all with complementary long vowels.

Vowels
	Front		Central		Back	
	short	long	short	long	short	long
High	i	iː			u	uː
Mid	e	eː			o	oː
Low			a	aː		
