= Hashim Ali Khan =

Indian Army officer

Hashim Nawaz jung Bahadur, O.B.I.Col.Sardar Bahadur
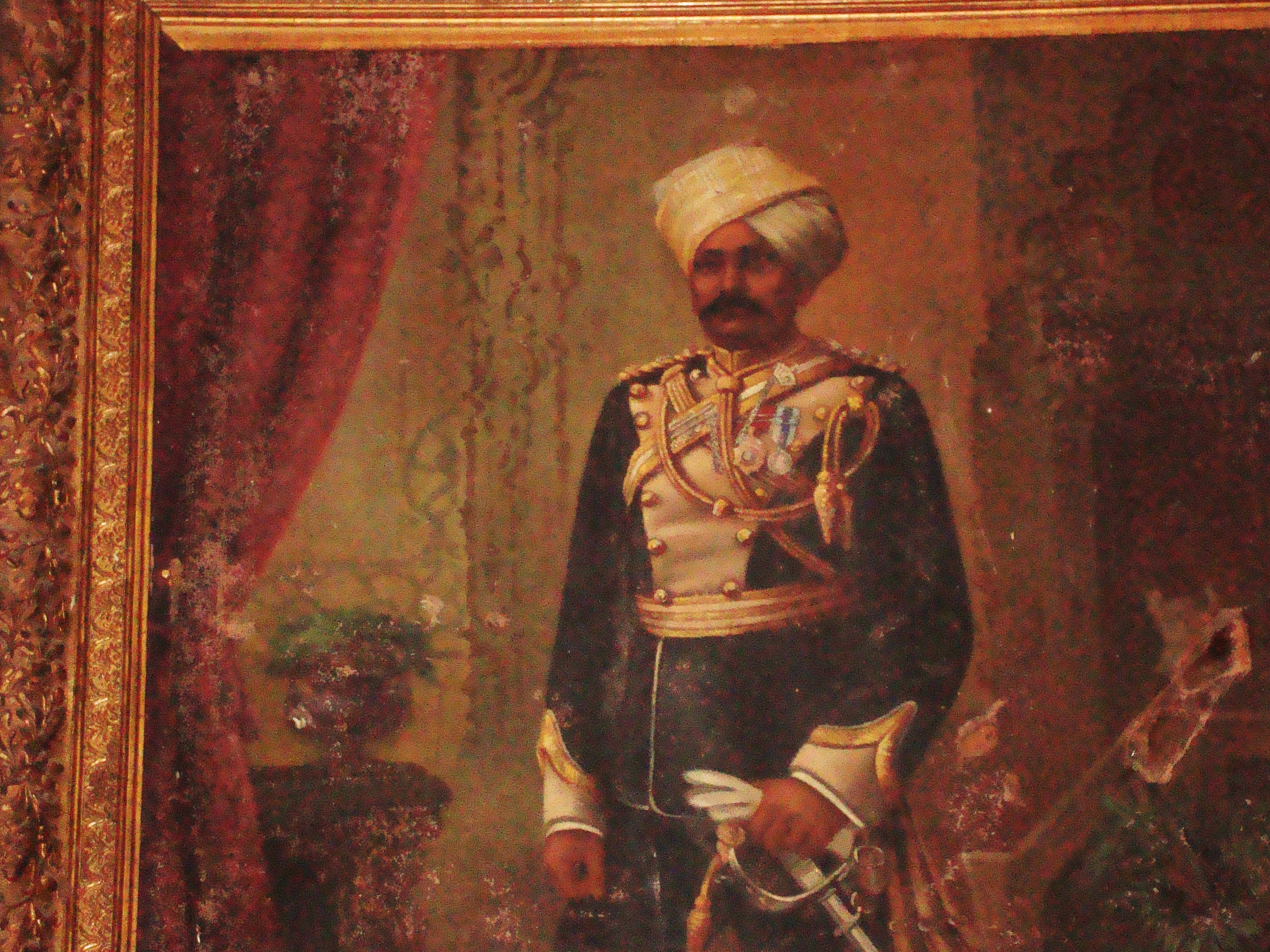
- Died: Hyderabad
- Military career
- Rank: commandant
- Known for: Representing Hyderabad Imperial Service Lancer Troops in England on Queen Victoria's Diamond Jubilee and for the re-establishment of The Hyderabad 2nd Lancers in 1923 at Golconda.

Mir Hashim Ali Khan (Arabic: هاشم على خاں; honorific titles: Nawab Hashim Nawaz Jang Bahadur, Colonel, Sardar Bahadur) was commandant of the 2nd Lancers, Imperial Service Troops, of the Hyderabad State.

== Biography ==
Mir Hashim Ali Khan represented the Hyderabad Imperial Lancers at Queen Victoria's Diamond Jubilee. On reaching Hyderabad-deccan with the help of other Commandants, he founded the 2nd Nizams own (N.O.) Hyderabad Imperial Service (H.I.S.) Lancers Troops. The Regiment was first raised in 1893 at Golkonda (HYD-Deccan) by the late general Sir Afsar-ul-mulk Bahadur, the then commander of the Nizams regular forces.

The regiment was designated as 2nd lancers Hyderabad Imperial Service Troops and was organised in accordance with the establishment of the Indian Cav. Regt. In April 1923, the regiment was again re-organised and re-designated by Col. Hashim Nawaz Jung. O.B.I. Col. Sardar Bahadur, as 2nd Hyderabad Imperial Service Lancers (Nizams own) and soon made its Commandant after getting retired from the 2nd lancers. He served as commanding officer of the Nizam Mahbub Force. The Hyderabad Imperial Services Troops wasn't an IST unit, but a part of the Indian army. Navy & Army Illustrated published an article about the unit, featuring Mir Hashim Ali Khan.

== Family ==
Mir Hashim Ali Khan was married to Zakia Begum. The couple had four sons and eight daughters. The sons included Nawab Alam yar jung Bahadur, Chief Justice of Hyderabad and Law Minister, Nawab Talib Ali Khan, Accountant General of Hyderabad, Subhan Ali Khan, & Iqbal ali khan. The daughters included Mehdi Begum w/o Dr Syed Mehdi Ali (Mansabdar), Tahera Begum, Syeda Begum, Masooma Begum, Shujaath Begum, Abbasi Begum, Khairunissa Begum, and Taiba Begum.

== Honors and titles ==
Mir Hashim Ali Khan received the following honours and distinctions from the British Government and the Nizam of Hyderabad.

- Nawab
- Nawaz Jung
- Bahadur
- Order of British India (O.B.I.)
- Colonel
- Sardar Bahadur (heroic leader)
- Commandant
- Mansabdar
- Jagirdar

== Gallery ==
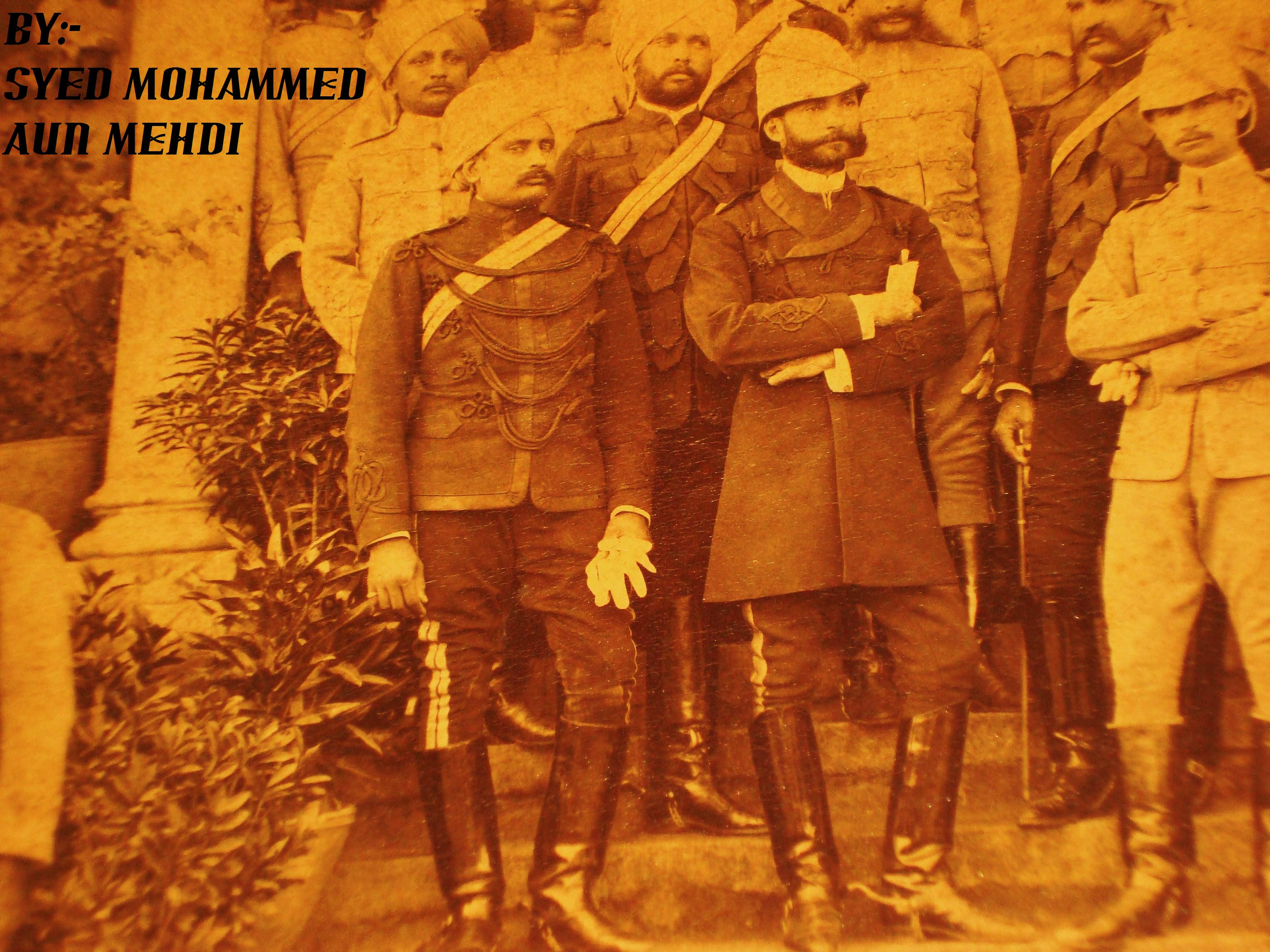
Mir Hashim Ali Khan (first from left; first row); with Major Afsar Ud dowlah at the 2nd (N.O) H.I.S.L.T headquarters Golconda .

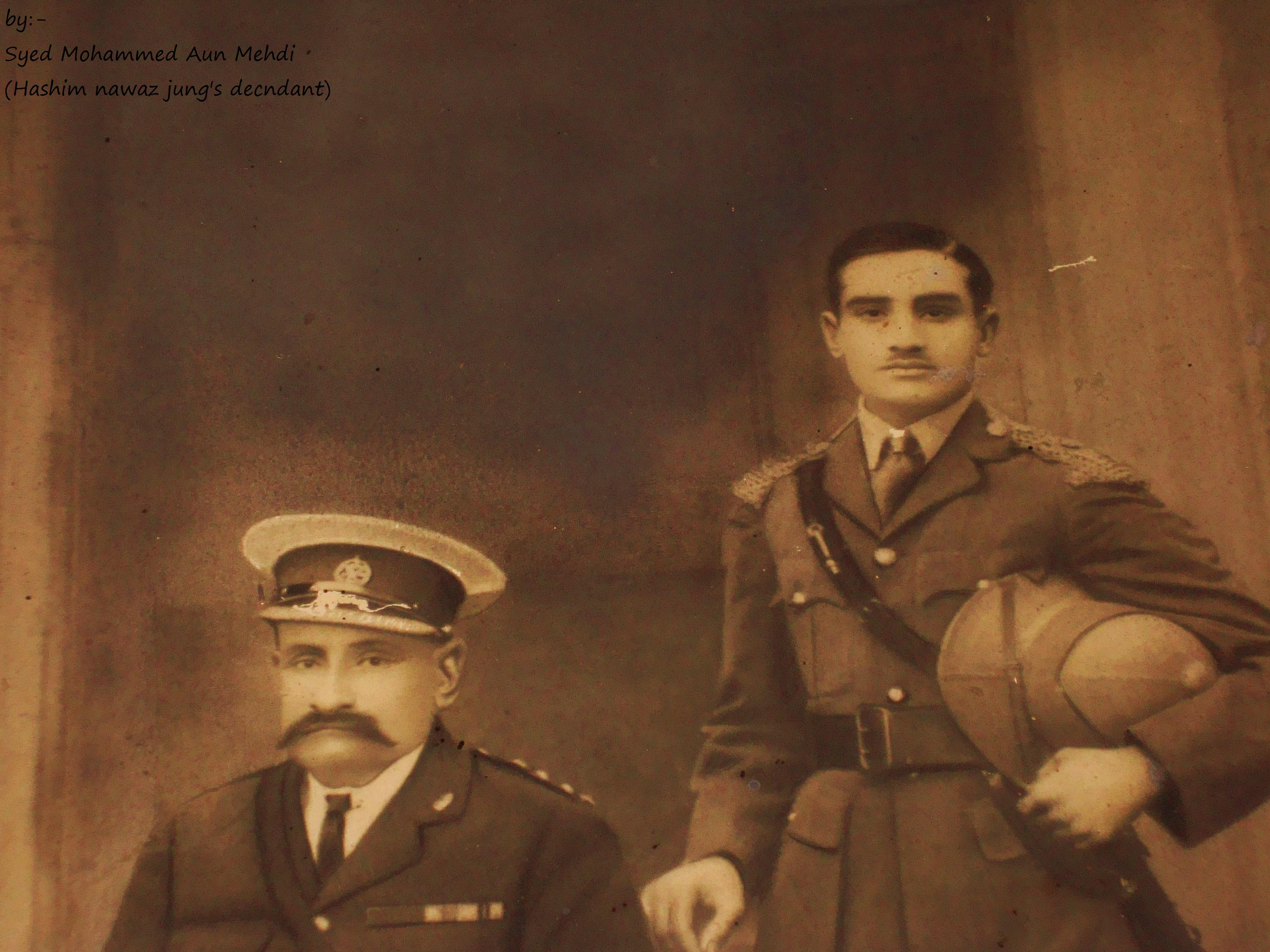
Col Nawab Hashim Nawaz Jung OBI sardar Bahadur with Col Nawab Subhan ali khan(secretary to Azam Jah the prince of Berar )

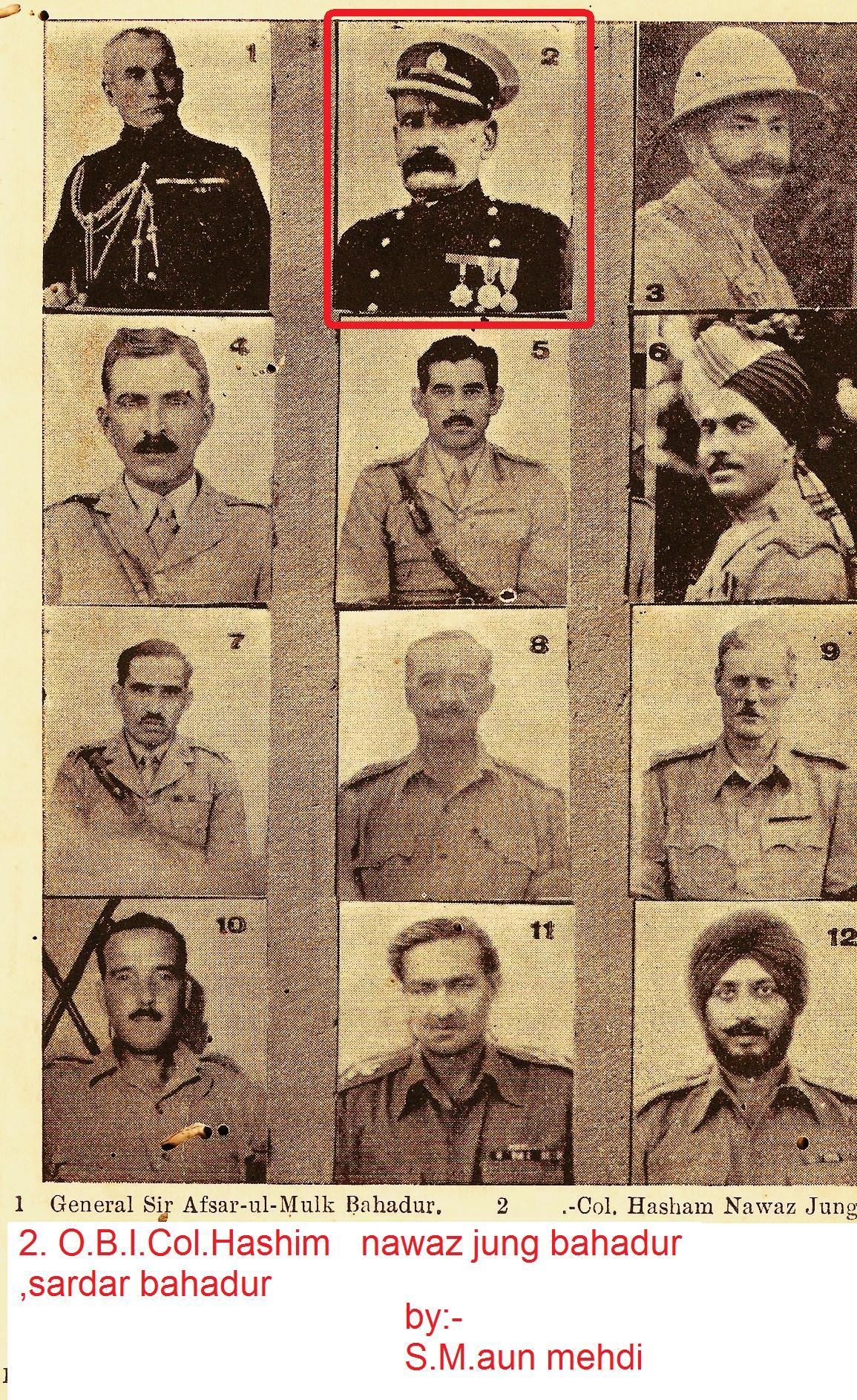
Page 5, Hyderabad 2nd Lancers, Aun Mehdi
