= Imam Bux Talpur =

Pakistani Sindhi politician (born 1918)

Mir Sardar Bahadur Mir Imam Bux Khan Talpur Mir O.B.I
- مير امام بخش خان ٽالپر

Personal details
- Born: March 1918 Mirpur Khas, Sindh
- Parent: Mir Allahdad Talpur (father)

Mir Imam Bux Khan Talpur (Sindhi: مير امام بخش خان ٽالپر) O.B.I, Mir (born March 1918, date of death unknown) was a Pakistani Sindhi politician, landlord, and public servant from Mirpur Khas, Sindh. He hailed from the Talpur dynasty, the former ruling family of Sindh.

== Early life and education ==
Mir Imam Bux Khan Talpur was born in March 1918 in Mirpur Khas, Sindh. He was a descendant of His Highness Mir Sher Muhammad Khan Talpur, the last ruler of independent Sindh who led resistance against British colonial forces at the Battle of Dabbah near Hyderabad. After the defeat, Mir Sher Muhammad continued guerrilla warfare before migrating to Punjab, where he settled in a place known as Mirs Khoi.

Talpur passed the Senior Cambridge Examination in 1936 from Karachi, in a time when higher education among Sindhi Muslims was rare. His father, Nawab Mir Haji Allahdad Khan Talpur, was a prominent political and social figure who served as a member of the Legislative Assembly (MLA) for twelve years and was president of the District Local Board for eight years. He was also awarded the prestigious title of Sardar Bahadur.

== Political career ==
Mir Imam Bux Khan Talpur joined the All-India Muslim League before the independence of Pakistan and played a vital role in organizing the league's activities in the Mirpur Khas District. He was elected as an MLA in 1953 and simultaneously served as the president of the local board.

In 1954, he was inducted into the Sindh Cabinet. He first served as the minister in charge of forest and excise departments, and was later appointed as the minister for refugees and rehabilitation, a critical role during the post-Partition resettlement period.

== Philanthropy and social work ==
Talpur was a committed advocate of education for Muslims, which he considered his life mission. He financed scholarships for thirty-six Muslim students enrolled in Mirpurkhas Madressah.

He also held the position of sub-leader of the National War Front in Mirpur Khas District, reflecting his engagement in broader national efforts during wartime mobilization.

== Personal life and legacy ==
A leading zamindar (landlord) of Mirpur Khas, he owned a cotton-ginning factory in Jhuluri. Mir Imam Bux Khan married within the Talpur family and had three sons: Lutuf Ullah, Habib Ullah, and Fazl Ullah.

He was known for his passion for horse riding, shooting, and travelling across India. He resided in Mirpur Khas, located in the Tharparkar District of West Pakistan (now Sindh, Pakistan). He also received a political pension, acknowledging his contributions to governance and public service.
