= Title Badge =

Badge for holders of certain titles bestowed by British India.

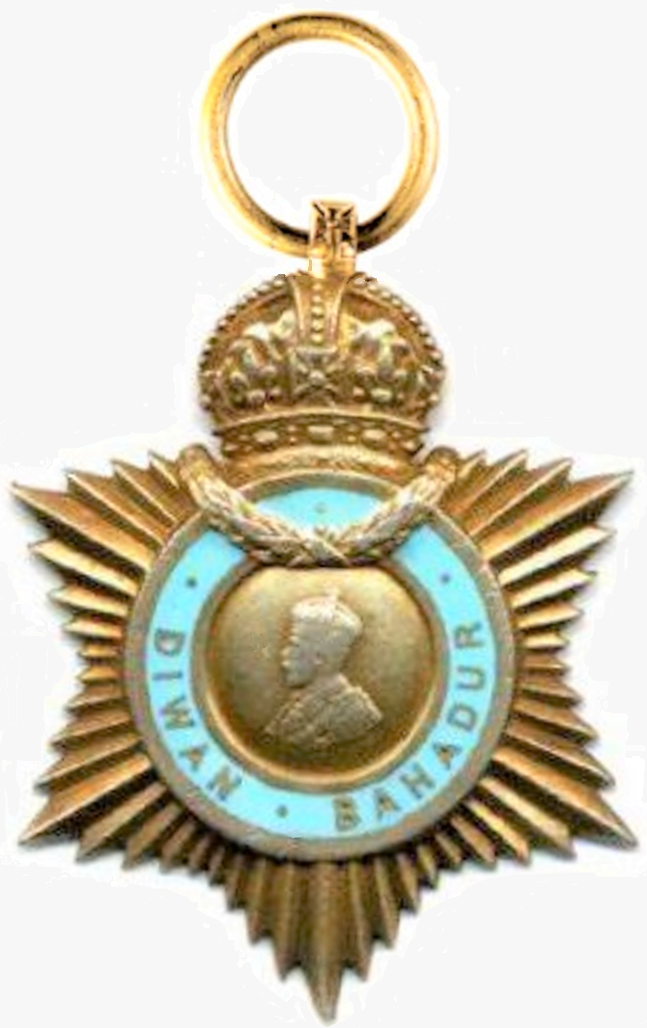
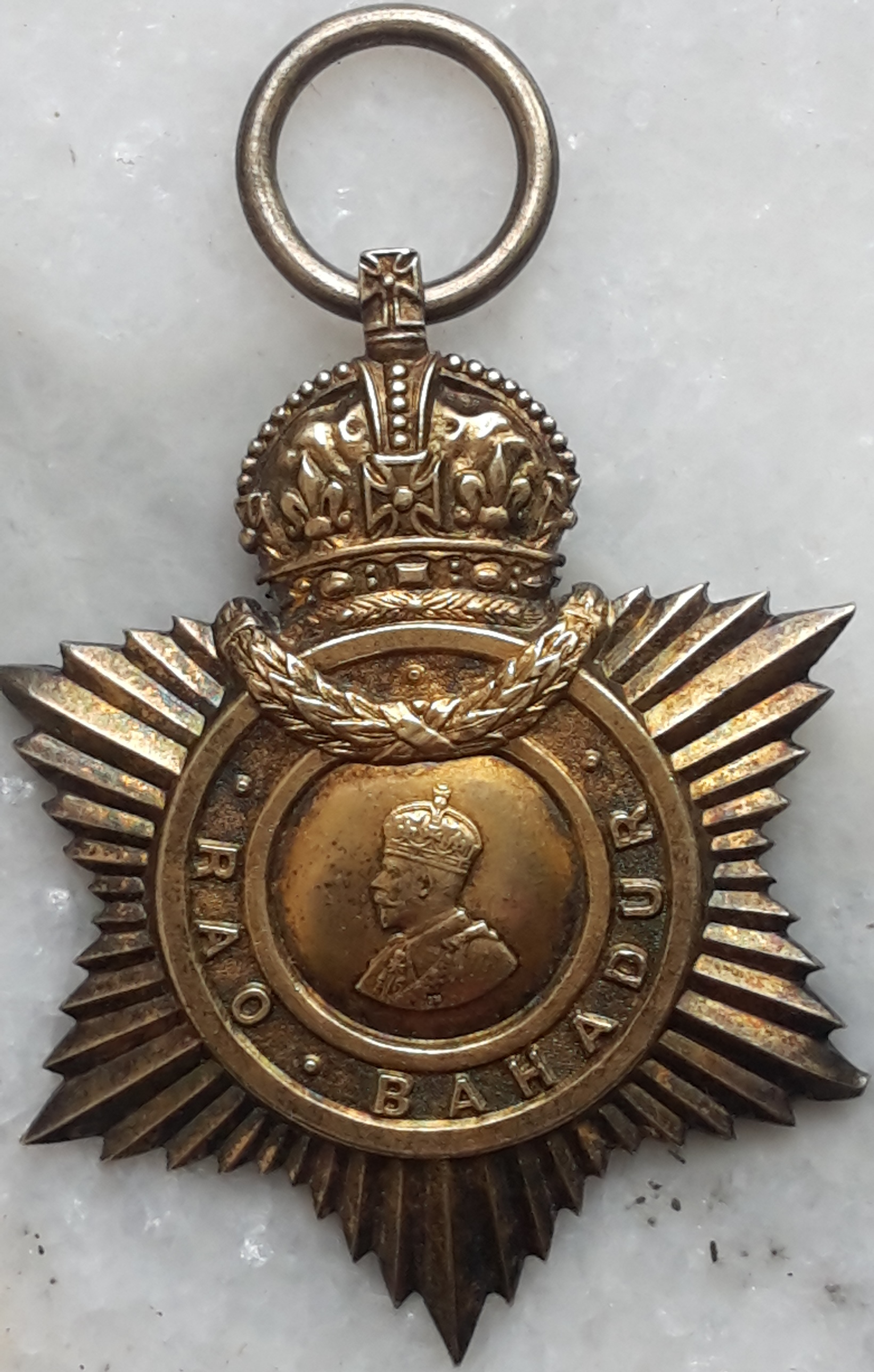
- Insignia for Diwan Bahadur and Rao Bahadur
- Type: Title holder's insignia
- Awarded for: Faithful service or acts of public welfare
- Presented by: the Emperor of India
- Eligibility: Native Indian civilians and Viceroy's commissioned officers
- Status: No longer awarded
- Established: 12 December 1911
- First award: June 1912
- Final award: 1947
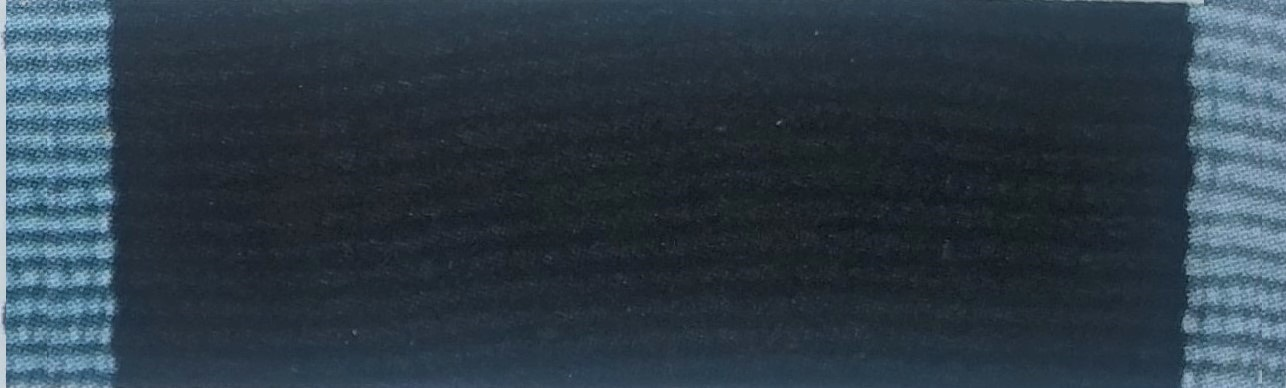
- Ribbon: 1st class Ribbon: 2nd class Ribbon: 3rd class

Title Badges were presented to Indian citizens who received certain formal titles of honour during British rule in India. They ceased to be awarded in 1947 on Indian independence.

== Establishment ==
The system for bestowing titles on prominent Indians pre-dated the British presence in India. As part of a wider awards system, the British used these traditional Indian titles to reward native Indian civilians and Viceroy's commissioned officers of the Indian Army for faithful service and acts of public welfare.

At the Delhi Durbar celebrations in 1911, King George V established a series of badges to be worn by title holders, enabling them to publicly display the title held. The award was dis-established in 1947, upon Indian independence.

== Classes ==
There were three classes, each sub-divided to reflect the religion, and sometimes region, of the title holder.

First Class

- Nawab Bahadur, for Muslims. Often also awarded to Sikhs from the Punjab as Sardar Bahadur.
- Diwan Bahadur, for Hindus;

Second Class

- Khan Bahadur, for Muslims;
- Rai Bahadur (North India) or Rao Bahadur (South India), for Hindus;

Third Class

- Khan Sahib, for Muslims. There was a Sardar Sahib Title Badge for Sikhs from the Punjab. Elsewhere they were rewarded as Hindus.
- Rai Sahib (North India) or Rao Sahib (South India), for Hindus.

Those of other religions received the title considered most appropriate, for example native Indian Christians with a Hindu sounding name would receive a Hindu title, with Jews receiving a Muslim title.

Title badges took precedence after all British and Indian orders and decorations, and before campaign medals. In most cases, recipients proceeded from the lowest class to the higher grades, with only the most senior title, and badge, used. Ranking below a knighthood, these titles were dropped by any holder who became a knight of a British Order, for example the Order of the Star of India or the Order of the Indian Empire.

Members of the first class of the Order of British India could also use the title of Sardar Bahadur, with members of the second class using Bahadur. In these cases, the Title Badge was not worn.

== Appearance ==
The badge consisted of a radiant star topped by an imperial crown, with a laurel wreath draped below the crown. A central medallion bore the appropriate title on a band surrounding the crowned profile of the king, either George V or George VI. Facing right until 1933, the design was then changed to show George V's bust facing left. The George VI version showed his bust facing left.
The reverse was plain, and was engraved with the name and details of the recipient.

All three classes were the same size: 58 millimetres (2.3 in) in height and 45 millimetres (1.8 in) wide, differentiated by their metal finish and ribbon:

- 1st class: silver gilt with the title displayed on the central medallion enamelled pale blue. The ribbon was light blue edged with dark blue;
- 2nd class: silver gilt without enamel. The ribbon was red edged with dark red;
- 3rd class: silver with the title displayed on the central medallion enamelled dark blue. The ribbon was dark blue edged with light blue.

All three classes were worn around the neck from the 39 millimetres (1.5 in) wide ribbon, although the badge was sometimes unofficially worn on the left chest alongside other medals. (Note: Confirmed by contemporary photographs, e.g. C. S. Ratnasabhapathy Mudaliar)

== See also ==
- Raj Ratna
- Dewan
