= Sardar Bahadur =

British Indian honorary title

Sardar Bahadur was a title of honour awarded to native Indian civilians and Viceroy's commissioned officers during British rule in India. It was bestowed upon Sikhs, and was awarded for faithful service or acts of public welfare. The title was used after any military rank, but before the title holder's name. From 1911 holders of the title were also awarded a special Title Badge.

Members of the first class of the Order of British India could also use the title of Sardar Bahadur, with members of the second class using Bahadur. The title of Sardar Bahadur was part of a wider honours system put in place by British India: It was used for Sikhs or military officials.

First Class

- Dewan Bahadur, for Hindus;
- Nawab Bahadur, for Muslims;

Second Class

- Khan Bahadur, for Muslims;
- Rai Bahadur, (North India) or Rao Bahadur (South India), for Hindus;

Third Class

- Khan Sahib, for Muslims;
- Rai Sahib, (North India) or Rao Sahib (South India), for Hindus.

Those of other religions received the title considered most appropriate, for example native Indian Christians with a Hindu sounding name would receive a Hindu title.

In most cases a recipient proceeded from the lowest grade to a higher level, with only the most senior title used. Ranking below a knighthood, these titles were dropped by any holder who became a knight of a British Order, for example the Order of the Star of India or the Order of the Indian Empire.

Sardar Bahadur and similar titles issued during British Raj were dis-established in 1947 upon the independence of India.

== Recipients ==
- Sardar Bahadur Colonel Jwala Singh Hundal (Kaiser i hind, Manager of Golden Temple, Amritsar)
- Sardar Bahadur Arjan Singh Chahal
- Sardar Bahadur Lieutenant Genda Singh
- Sardar Bahadur Arjan Singh Bhullar
- Sardar Bahadur Jathedar Sir Arur Singh
- Sardar Bahadur Beant Singh
- Sardar Bahadur Captain Bishan Singh of Chak Sher Singh
- Sardar Bahadur Dal Singh
- Sardar Bahadur Datas Singh
- Sardar Bahadur Narendra Singh Gaur of Lahore
- Sardar Bahadur Gajjan Singh
- Sardar Bahadur Major Hargopal Singh Gaur
- Sardar Bahadur Risaldar Ganda Singh Dutt
- Sardar Bahadur Gopal Singh Khalsa
- Sardar Bahadur Gurmukh Singh
- Sardar Bahadur Captain Hira Singh Brar
- Sardar Bahadur Ishar Singh
- Sardar Bahadur Jagat Singh
- Sardar Bahadur Major Joginder Singh Baidwan
- Sardar Bahadur Karnail Singh
- Sardar Bahadur Kartar Singh
- Sardar Bahadur Kirpal Singh Mann
- Sardar Bahadur Doctor Lehna Singh Mehta
- Sardar Bahadur Mehtab Singh
- Sardar Bahadur Mohan Singh
- Sardar Bahadur Ram Singh Mahrok
- Sardar Bahadur Doctor Raghbir Singh Dugal
- Sardar Bahadur Sir Shamsher Singh
- Sardar Bahadur Raja Sher Singh Attariwala
- Sardar Bahadur Singar Singh
- Sardar Bahadur Sir Sobha Singh
- Sardar Bahadur Sujan Singh
- Sardar Bahadur Sunder Singh Majithia
- Sardar Bahadur Sir Teja Singh Malik
- Sardar Bahadur Ujjal Singh
- Captain Sardar Bahadur Chajja Singh (Clare) OBI
- Nawab Bahadur Allahdad Khan Talpur

== See also ==
- Raj Ratna
- Dewan
- Title Badge (India)
