= Dinanath Atmaram Dalvi =

Indian jurist and mathematician (1844–1897)

Rao Saheb Dinanath Atmaram Dalvi
- Born: c. 1844
- Died: February 1897 Place Bombay
- Education: Elphinstone College
- Occupations: Judge; Mathematician
- Spouse: Shanta Janwadkar
- Children: 3

Rao Saheb Dinanath Atmaram Dalvi (c. 1844 – 10 February 1897) was an Indian Judge and amateur mathematician. His father, Atmaram Bapu Dalvi, was a social reformer and was Vice President of the Bombay Arya Samaj in 1880.

== Career ==
Dinanath Atmaram Dalvi obtained his BA degree in 1865 from Elphinstone College in Bombay. He was then selected as Senior Scholar and later obtained MA degree from Elphinstone College in 1866. He obtained his LLB degree in 1868 and was a Senior Dakshina Fellow in 1868. He was made Fellow of Bombay University on 17 February 1881.

He systematically examined Newton's rule for finding the number of imaginary roots and in 1869 he wrote and published a book entitled "An Examination of Sir Isaac Newton's Rule for finding the Number of Imaginary Square Roots in an Equation", in which he provides mechanical and geometric theorems and gives a direct and complete proof and disproof of the equation. He does not use equations or particular classes of equations but uses direct method of algebraic inequalities to show the failure of Newtons law. He thus established a Rule for forming equation of failure of Newtons rule and came to a conclusion that the rule may not be universally true and that there may be imaginary roots where there are none. He was challenged on this with various articles for and against him in The Times of India. One of his critics while writing to the Editor pointed out that in 1669, when Sir Isaac Newton was Lucasian Professor of Mathematics, he used to jot down portions of his lectures, definitions, propositions, examples partially wrought out as were necessary. In such a manuscript never intended for publication much would have been omitted which he could supply or vary as needed and such a rule for finding square roots of imaginary numbers was just one of it, which he was likely to omit. Professor Colin McLaurin of the McLaurin series, James Stirling famous for Stirling permutations who had proved the correctness of Newton's classification of cubic plane curves supplied demonstrations and analysis of this rule. His successor Professor Whiston found this manuscript and published it in 1707 long after Sir Issac Newton had first written it down so these omissions persisted. Mr Dalvi’s pleader while writing in the Times of India in August 1870 pointed out that even as late as 1712 when the Society of useful knowledge published a second and more complete edition on the life of Sir Isaac Newton with his participation according to Willem Gravesande, Newton ought to have given a proof of this rule, which he doesn’t. Dinanath Dalvi was Examiner for first Examination in Arts, Analytic Trigonometry, Arithmetic, and Algebra at Bombay University along with James Burgess, who later on became Director General of Archaeological Survey of India and Assistant Governor of Bombay. He also taught logic and Butlers Sermon in Bombay university. After Professor Candy retired as Professor of Mathematics from Elphinstone College he was considered as an assistant to that post. He was appointed as a Subordinate judge in Pimpulgaum Tanna (Thane district then Tanna) in Bombay Presidency in 1873 and served in Junnar as a Second Class Subordinate Judge in 1876. He then became a sub-judge in 1883 at Akola in Ahmednagar district, in 1885 at Nevasa in Ahmednagar district, in 1888 at Satana, Erandol in Jalgaon District. In 1892, he was Subordinate Judge of Kada, Karjat in Ahmednagar District and in 1895, he was Subordinate Judge in Parner.

Helena Blavatsky in her book - "From the Caves and Jungles of Hindustan" referred to him as possibly the greatest mathematical genius in the world. She wrote that according to Sir James Braithwaite Peile, Director of National Education in India, Dalvi proved that the great Newton was mistaken from the beginning to the end in his "Rule for Imaginary Square roots" and the application of this Newtonian rule does not bring about the intended result. Sir James Braithwaite Peile also reported that D. A. Dalvi blew the theorems of Professor James J. Sylvester, one of the greatest English mathematicians, into smithereens. He wrote on Aryan Trigonometry and published in the Theosophist Part 1 1879-1880 how the Ancient Indian Trigonometrical rule for finding sine of an angle long antedates Hipparchus and Hindus before the beginning of the Christian Era, were in possession of the supposed recent trigonometrical discoveries of Euler. His knowledge on vedic geometry was such that in April 1881 he was asked by the Editor of the Theosophist to critique a paper titled 'Geometry on the principles of the ancient Hindu philosophy' written by Munshi Sada sukh Ram where Munshi Sada Sukh Lal. 1881, v2, April, p151, Memorandum [to Geometry on the Principles of the Ancient Hindu Philosophy].DA Dalvi gives a geometric explanation for the three famous problems of antiquity.

== Personal life ==
He married Shanta Dalvi (née Janwadkar) and had two daughters, Hira and Putala Dalvi, and a son, Madhusudan. D. Dalvi. Dinanath Dalvi’s sister, Yamuna Dalvi, donated money to Bombay university to create the Yamunabai Atmaram Dalvi Sanskrit scholarship. Dinanath himself donated Rs 500 in 1883 for the founding of a scholarship in the Government Girls school in Ahmednagar. His son sailed for England in 1912 and returned to Bombay in 1920, after obtaining AMIES from the Institution of Engineers and Shipbuilders, Glasgow. He later became Chief Officer of Poona City Municipality in 1940, after which he was appointed as Chief Engineer by the Last Nawab of Junagadh in the erstwhile Princely State of Junagadh, at a time when Sir Shahnawaz Bhutto was the Dewan. His sister Hira Dalvi married Justice S. S. Patkar Pusine Judge, later Acting Chief Justice of the Bombay High Court. Dr Amod Dalvi Consultant in Cognitive Disorders and Academic based in the UK his direct descendent
