= Subjudge =

Subjudge or sub-judge may refer to:

- Subordinate judge, a judge of a subordinate court in the Indian court system
- Podsędek (literally: sub-judge), a historical judicial official in Poland

== See also ==
- Sub judice, means that a particular case or matter is under trial or being considered by a judge or court.
