= Khan Bahadur =

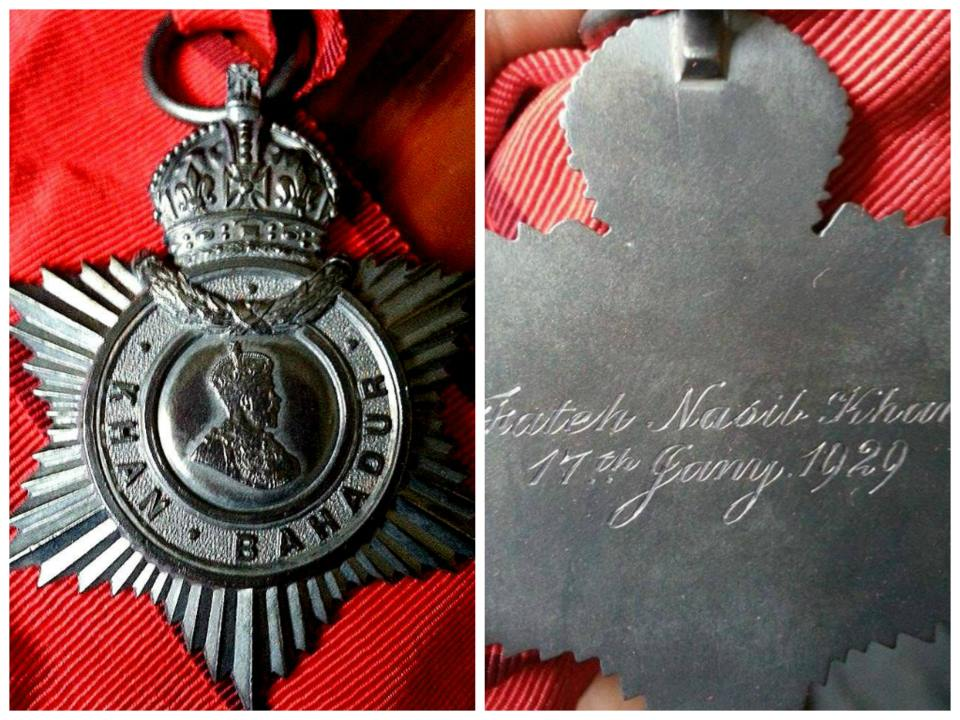
- Title Badge for Khan Bahadur
- Type: Civilian Honour
- Country: British India
- Presented by: Viceroy of India
- Eligibility: Muslim Indian, Zoroastrian Indian
- Status: Discontinued (since 1947)

Precedence
- Next (higher): Nawab Bahadur
- Equivalent: Rao Bahadur; Sardar Bahadur
- Next (lower): Khan Sahib

Khan Bahadur – a compound of Khan "Leader" and Bahadur "Brave" – was an honorary title in British India conferred on Indian subjects who were adherents of Islam or Zoroastrianism. The equivalent title for Hindus, Buddhists and Indian Christians was Rao Bahadur/Rai Bahadur and Sardar Bahadur for Sikhs. The title of Khan Bahadur was one degree higher than the title of Khan Sahib.

The title was conferred on individuals for faithful service or acts of public welfare to the British Empire. Recipients were entitled to prefix the title to their name and were presented with a special Title Badge and a citation (Sanad). It was conferred on behalf of the Government of British India by the Viceroy and Governor-General of India.

Awarding of the Khan Bahadur title was discontinued in 1947 upon the independence of India.

The title "Khan Bahadur" was originally conferred in Mughal India on Muslim subjects in recognition of public services rendered and was adopted by British India for the same purpose and extended to cover other non-Hindu subjects of India. Hindu subjects of British India were conferred the title of "Rai Bahadur".

== Recipients ==
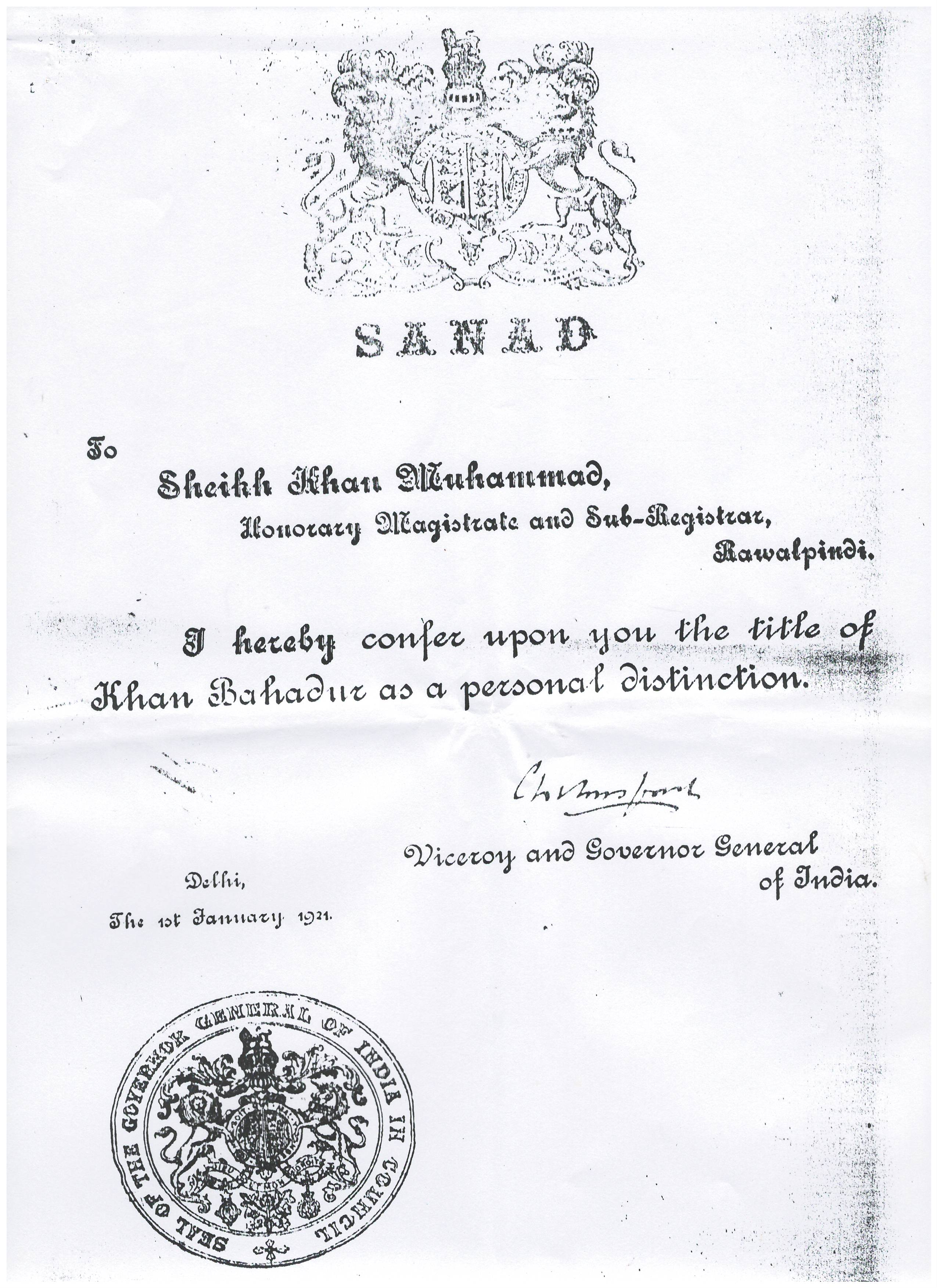
Sanad of Khan Bahadur Shaikh Khan Mohammed Qureshi of Bohar Mohallah Rawalpindi. 1921, Delhi

The following is an incomplete chronological list of selected recipients:

- 1881: Khan Bahadur Khuda Bakhsh C.I.E, Former Chief Justice of Hyderabad State, Founder of Khuda Bakhsh Oriental Library
- Raja Mir Syed Muhammad Baquar Ali Khan C.I.E. of Morni, Kotaha and Pindrawal
- 1887: Nawab Sirjaul Islam
- 1891: Khan Bahadur Malik Zaman Mehdi Khan of Darapur, Jhelum.
- 1891: Mian Ghulam Farid Khan Bahadur, former Extra-Assistant Commissioner in Punjab and Honorary Magistrate of Batala.
- Khan Bahadur Khalifullah Rowther Sahib, Dewan of Pudukkottai State
- 1898: Khan Bahadur Humayun Beg Wazir of Hunza.
- 1903: Khan Bahadur Din Muhammad, Extra Assistant Commissioner, Kasur, in the Lahore District of the Punjab.
- 1905: Muhammad Habibullah was awarded the title of Khan Bahadur by the Indian government
- 1912: Khan Bahadur Sayed Rustom Ali (Registrar, Court of the Political Resident, Aden).
- 1912: Khan Bahadur Nadir Husain, District Superintendent of Police, Bengal.
- 1914: Khan Bahadur Muhammad Hira Khan (Civil Engineer from University of Roorkee (Gold Medalist); Supervisor, Public Works Department, Lucknow, United Provinces.
- 1919: Khan Bahadur Muhammad Hussain Khan Swati, 5th Chief of Swati tribe.

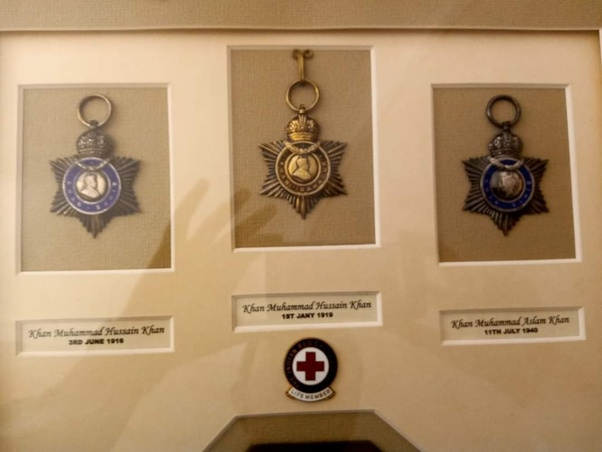
The first shield is of Khan Sahib presented to Khan Muhammad Hussain Khan Swati in 1916, the second shield is of Khan Bahadur presented to same person in 1921 while the third shield of Khan Sahib was presented to his nephew Khan Muhammad Aslam Khan Swati (7th Chief of Swati tribe). Picture is taken from a wall of Chief of Swati house at Garhi Habibullah

- 1921 Khan Sahib Sir Mohammad Usman of Madras was conferred the title of Khan Bahadur. He was later conferred the title of Knight Commander Order of the Indian Empire. Sir Mohammad Usman became the first Indian acting Governor of Madras Presidency and a member of the Viceroy's Executive Council.
- 1923: Khan Bahadur Mian Muhammad Said, Bar-at-law, British-Indian Police and Minister in Royal State of Kapurthala.
- 1925: Khan Bahadur Maulvi Gada Husain (retired), Deputy Collector, United Provinces., full name Munshi Gada Husain (b. 1867). Earlier, as part of the 1922 King's Birthday Honours, Munshi Gada Husain was given the title of Khan Sahib by Viceroy and Governor-General, Rufus Isaacs, and in April 1923, he was nominated to the Ghazipur District Board.
- 1925: Khan Bahadur Maulvi Alimuzzaman Chaudhuri. M.L.C. Landholder and Chairman, District Board and Municipality, Faridpur.

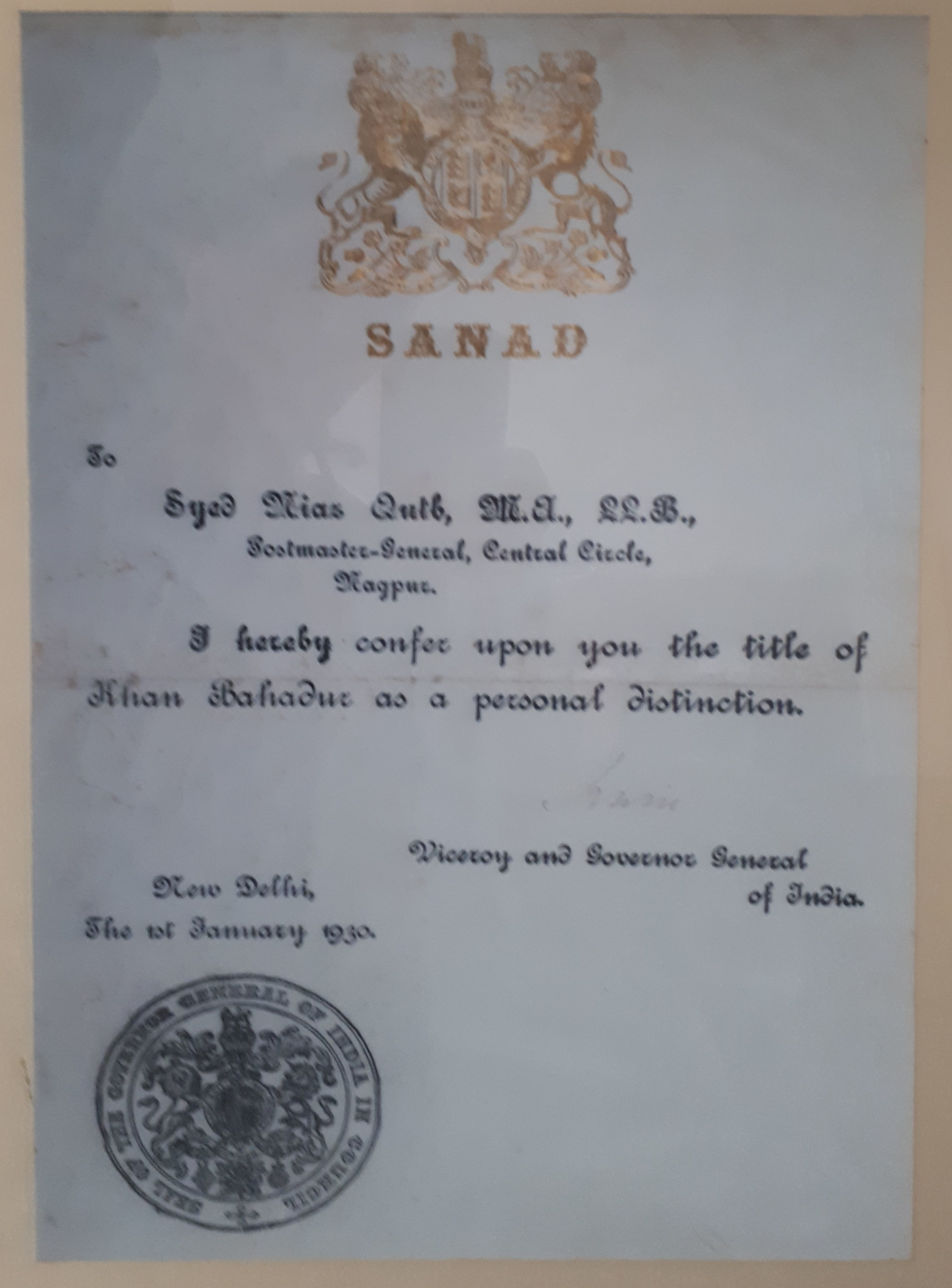
"Sanad" awarded in 1930 by Lord Irwin, Viceroy of India, to Syed Niaz Qutb

- 1929: Khan Bahadur Major General Fateh Naseeb Khan, Senapati, Alwar State, Rajputana
- 1930: Khan Bahadur Raja Muhammad Akram Khan of Jhelum; also awarded Khan Sahib. Member Punjab Legislative Assembly.
- 1930: Khan Bahadur Syed Niaz Qutb (also spelled as Qutab), Postmaster General.
- 1932: Khan Bahadur Maulvi Muhammad Fazlul Karim, Magistrate, collector, and administrator of Refugees, Bengal.
- 1933: Khan Bahadur Chaudhry Irshadullah Ranjha, Member Legislative Assembly, Chief of Ranjha tribe, Honorary Magistrate.
- 1934: Khan Bahadur Abdur Rahman Khan, Divisional Inspector of Schools.
- 1936: Khan Bahadur Khalifa Mohammad Asadullah, the first Muslim and second Indian to run the Imperial Library of the Raj in Calcutta and the first Indian to become a fellow of the Library Association, London.
- 1937: Sheikh Abdullah (1874–1965), Indian educationalist, social reformer, lawyer, and the founder of Women's College, Aligarh.
- 1938: Khan Bahadur Waliur Rahman, Planter and Proprietor of several tea gardens in Duars, Assam.
- 1939: Khan Bahadur Muhammad Humayun, District Collector 1937–1939, ICS — Nellore.
- 1940: Khan Bahadur Maulvi Muhammad Yahya (retired), Deputy Magistrate, Deputy Collector and Chief Manager, Dacca Nawab Estate.
- 1941: Khan Bahadur Sardar Abdul Samad Khan, Magistrate of Punjab and Delhi.
- 1942: Khan Bahadur Yousof Hossain Chaudhury, vice-president, District School Board, Faridpur. [19] [The chieftains of Punjab] [The Gazette of Attock 1970].
- 1943: Khan Bahadur Aziz al-Hasan Ghouri

Zoroastrian recipients

- Khan Bahadur Ardeshir Irani, director of the first Indian talkie picture Alam Ara.
- Khan Bahadur Sir Kavasji Katrak, Parsi businessman and philanthropist.

== See also ==
- Dewan Bahadur
- Rai Bahadur
- Rai Sahib
- Title Badge (India)
