= Order of India =

The Order of India may refer to:

- Order of the Star of India (1861–1947)
- Order of the Indian Empire (1878–1947)
- Order of the Crown of India (1878–1947)
- Order of British India (1837–1947)
- Indian Order of Merit (1837–1947)
