= Khan Sahib =

Khan Sahib Medal
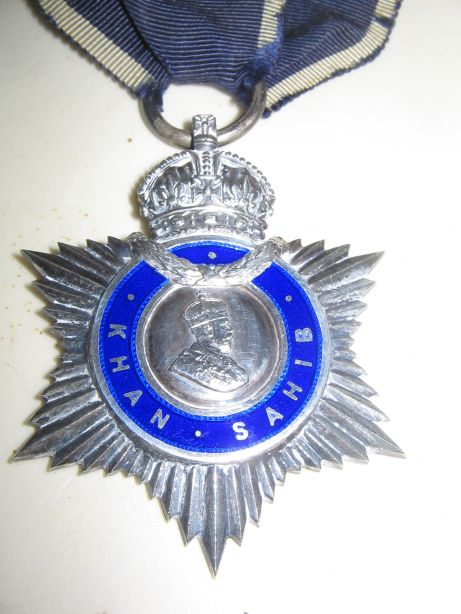
- Title Badge for Khan Sahib
- Type: Civil decoration
- Awarded for: Public service
- Presented by: Viceroy & Governor-General of India on behalf of the British Indian Government
- Eligibility: Muslim, Parsi and Jewish Commonwealth subjects of British India
- Status: Discontinued since 1947
- Final award: 1947

Precedence
- Next (higher): Khan Bahadur (title)
- Equivalent: Rai Sahib (for Hindus)
- Next (lower): Khan

Sanad (Citation) conferring the title of Khan Sahib to Dossabhoy Muncherji Raja.

Khan Sahib - a compound of Khan "Leader" and Sahib "Master" - was a formal title of respect and honour, which was conferred mainly on Muslim, and also on Parsi, Irani, and Jewish subjects of the British Indian Empire. It was a title one degree lower than Khan Bahadur, but higher than that of Khan.

The title was conferred along with a Title Badge and a citation (Sanad) and the recipient was entitled to prefix the title to his name. The title was conferred on behalf of the British Indian Government by the Viceroy and Governor-General of India.

The title "Khan Sahib" was originally conferred by the Mughal Empire on Muslim subjects in recognition of public services rendered and was adopted by the British Indian Empire for the same purpose. Hindu subjects of the British Indian Empire were conferred the title of "Rai Sahib". Since there were no separate titles for Parsi and Jewish subjects, the British Indian Empire conferred the Muslim title of Khan Sahib to Parsi and Jewish subjects as well.

The chronological list of recipients below is not exhaustive.

- 1904 Khan Sahib Karmally Joosab for personal distinction.
- 1904 Khan Sahib Hakim Ghulam Jilani for medical literature.
- 1912 Ismail Merathi Indian poet and educationist, was given the title for his literary and educational services.
- 1914 Syed Ahmad Dehlvi Author of Farhang-e-Asifiya.
- 1919 ansari karim bux was conferred the title of khan sahib medal
- 1919 Dr. Alibhai Mahomedbhai Mansuri was conferred the title of Khan Sahib as a personal distinction
- 1920 Sir Mohammad Usman of Madras was conferred the title of Khan Sahib. He later went on to obtain the titles of Khan Bahadur and Knight Commander of the Indian Empire. Sir Mohammad Usman became the first Indian acting Governor of Madras Presidency and a member of the Viceroy's Executive Council.
- 1923 Khan Sahib Muhammad Usman Khan Mohmand was conferred the title of Khan Sahib as a personal distinction. In 1919 he was appointed as Assistant Political Officer, Tochi, North-West Frontier Province.
- 1925 M. K. Khader Pillay Municipal President of Alwaye, Madras Presidency.
- 1926 Barrister Ghulam Ahmed Khan of Ludhiana earned the title for his services in judiciary and field of law. He completed his Bar from the Middle Temple during the year 1921.
- 1930 Musharraf Hossain Inspector of Schools, Dacca Division, of Kashba Majail, Pangsha, Faridpur.
- 1931 Chaudhry Niaz Ali Khan of Jamalpur for public service spanning 30 years by the 32nd Viceroy and Governor-General of India, Freeman Freeman-Thomas, 1st Marquess of Willingdon.
- 1934 Mir Afzal Khan Deputy Superintendent of Police, for meritorious police services awarded by the 22nd Viceroy and Governor-General of India, The Earl of Willingdon.

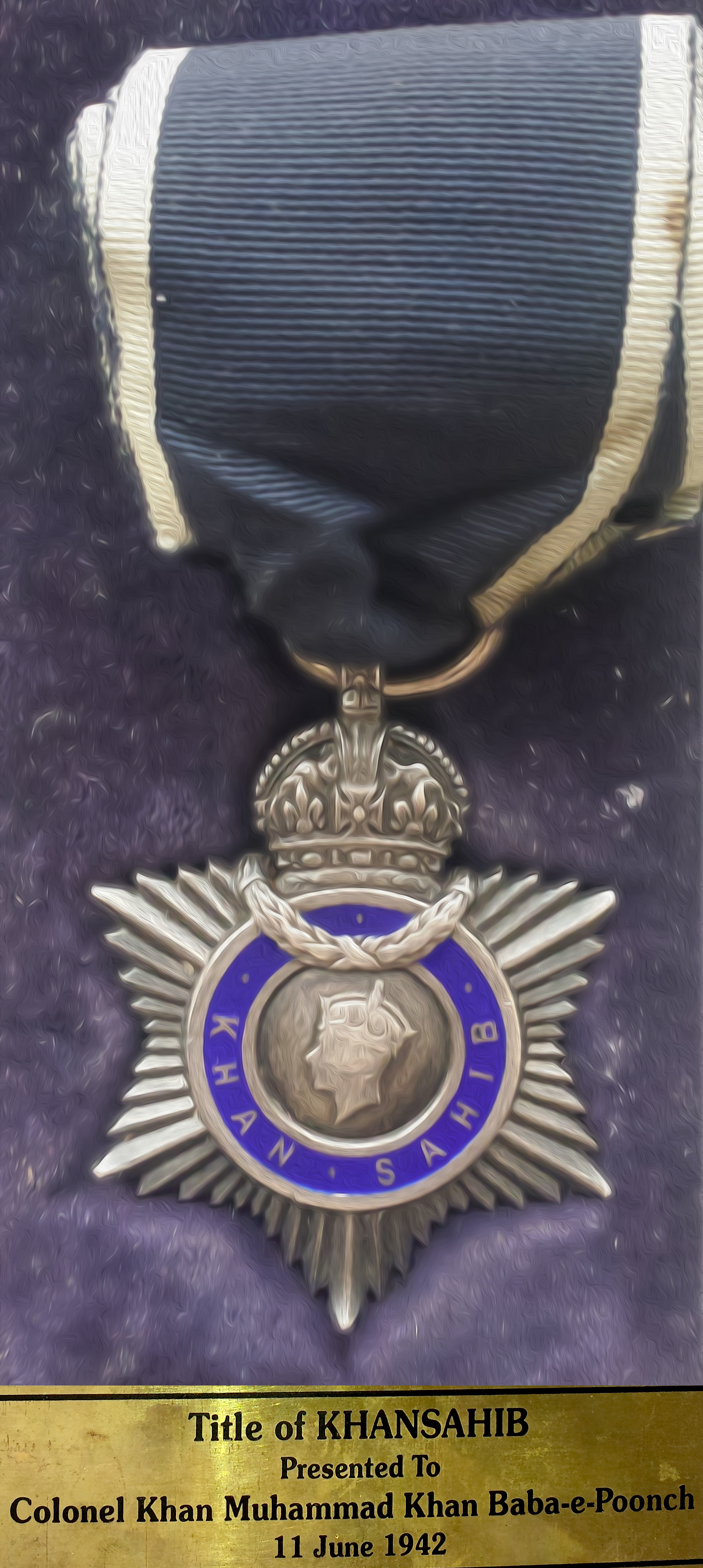
Khan Sahib title of Col. Khan Muhammad Khan.

- 1938 Khan Sahib Ali Murad Sanjrani was conferred the title of Khan Sahib as a personal distinction.
- 1940: Lieutenant Colonel Khan Bahadur Muhammad Hassan Khan (1900–1948), He belonged to Rasulpur near Domeli, Jhelum. He served in the British Royal Army during both World Wars, and the Pakistan Army in the 4th Battalion of Engineers Regiment. He was the first Director General Survey of Pakistan, appointed by the Quaid-e-Azam Muhammad Ali Jinnah. He died on 21 December 1948. His son Lieutenant Colonel Qurban Hassan Khan (Late), 18th PMA Long Course, was Chief Instructor Inter Services Intelligence (ISI), later adviser to the Prime Minister of the United Arab Emirates. His grandson Lieutenant Colonel Faisal Hassan Khan serves in the Pakistani Army.
- 1940: Khan Muhammad Aslam Khan Swati, 7th Chief of Swati tribe who later got title of Khan Bahadur too. He was son of 6th Chief of Swati tribe Khan Muhammad Akram Khan Swati and nephew of 5th Chief of Swati tribe Khan Bahadur Muhamad Hussain Khan.
- 1942 Subadar Major Sardar Bahadur Khan Sahib Malik Fathe Sher Khan Extra Recuriting Officer VCO (OBI,IDM,OBE, Durbar Medal, War Medal, Honarery Millitary Cross, RT Titel). He serve ward war 1 and 2.
- 1943 Shaikh Muhammad Abdul Sattar Sahib Bahadur Deputy Superintendent of Police, Madras, Awarded by Victor Hope, 2nd Marquess of Linlithgow (Viceroy & Governor-General of India).
- 1943 His Excellency JM Mohamed Ismael of South India (Landlord, Koothanallur), Businessmen, Chief of Indian British Muslims Community of Vietnam, Administrator of Vietnam Mosque received the title of Khan Saheb on 13 January 1943 for his non-finite humanitarian Services. He is the one who founded Indian Nationalist Society of Vietnam. During the Second World War, his participance is more appreciated questioning the cooperation of Japanese.
- Colonel Khan Muhammad Khan from Poonch, Kashmir, Pakistan was given the Khan Sahib title for his commitment and selfless service to the people of Kashmir on 11 June 1942 by Viceroy & Governor-General of India on behalf of the British Government.
- 1946 - Sheikh Shahabuddin was conferred the title by Lord Wavell for being a genius in the mechanical field, and for his honesty.
- 1946 - Mian Ghulam Mohiuddin Alvi Awan Alhashmi Indian trader was Awarded the Khan Sahib title Sanad & medal by Lord Wavell Voicroy of India for recognizing his trading work in India and Afghanistan.
- Aziz al-Hasan Ghouri
- 1940 Sahibzada Khurshid Ali Khan for his public services by the British India Government. He served in foreign service in Iraq and Sri Lanka. He belonged to Sahibzada family of Wayanwali, Punjab, Pakistan.

== See also ==
- Sardar Bahadur
- Dewan Bahadur
- Khan Bahadur
- Rai Bahadur
- Rai Sahib
- Rao Sahib
- Title Badge (India)
