= Baidwan =

Indian surname

Baidwan is a surname of Indian origin. Notable people with the surname include:

- Harvir Baidwan (born 1987), Indian-Canadian cricketer
- Joginder Singh Baidwan (1904–1940), Indian cricketer
