= Allahdad Talpur =

Sindhi Politician

Mir Sardar Bahadur Allahdad Talpur Mir O.B.I
- الله داد ٽالپر
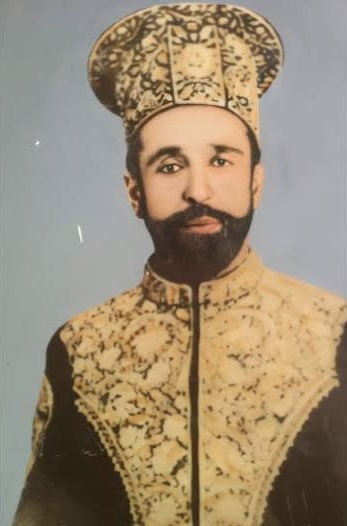

Member of Sindh Assembly
- Constituency: Tharparkar
- In office 27 April 1937 – 27 April 1945

Personal details
- Born: Mirpurkhas, Sindh
- Children: Mir Imam Bux Talpur
- Parent: H.H Mir Sher Muhammad Talpur (father)

Nawab Mir Allahdad Khan Talpur (Sindhi: الله داد ٽالپر) O.B.I, Mir, Haji was a Sindhi politician and Nawab belonging to the Talpur Dynasty.

== Life ==
Talpur spent eight years as the president of his District Local Board. He was elected to be a Member of Sindh Assembly in 1937, representing Tharparkar. He took office on April 27 of that year and held the position until his term ended on April 27, 1945. Talpur was awarded title of Sardar Bahadur.

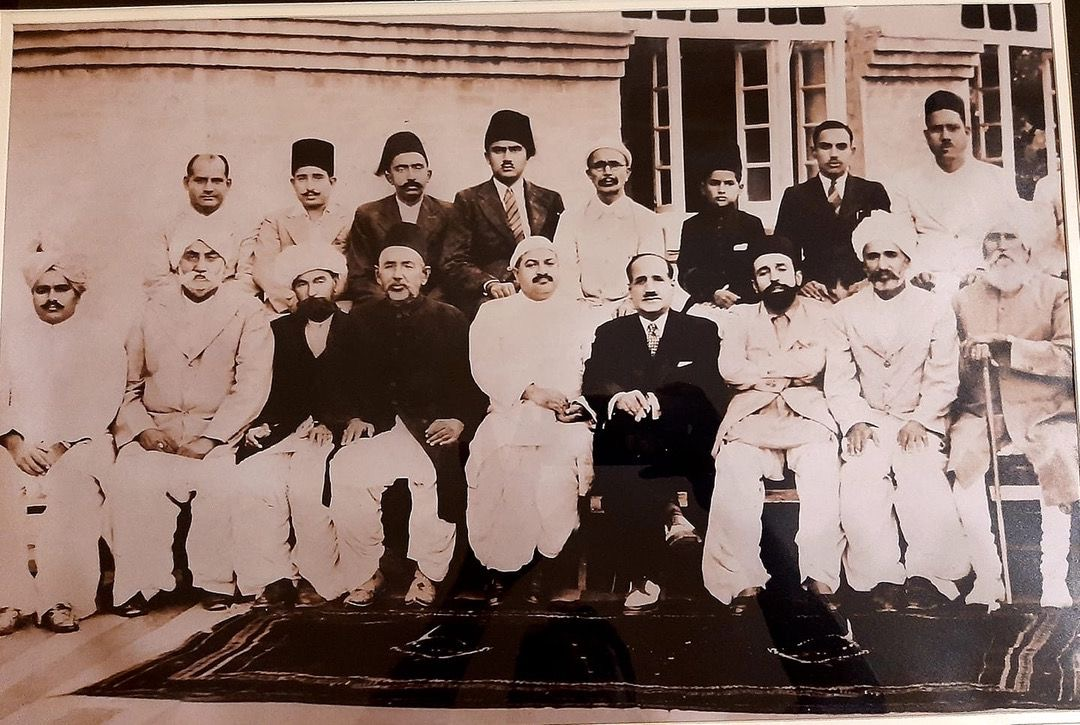
Bottom Row: from right to left Sundar Singh, Haji Wadal Shah, Mir AllahDad Talpur, Unknown, Seth Jhamandas, Ghulam Nabi Shah, Ali Murad Sanjrani, Din Muhammad Junejo, Seth Prem Chand Upper Row: Fourth from left is Ghulam Rasool Shah, rest unknown.

== Family ==
Talpur’s father, H.H. Mir Sher Mohammad Khan Talpur, was the last Sindh ruler to be independent from the British. He fought the British in the Battle of Dabbah, near Hyderabad, and was regarded as a military hero among the Sindh people.

Talpur’s son, Imam Bux Talpur, was a noted Muslim leader. He organized the Muslim League in his district and was elected M.L.A. and president of the Local Board in 1953. Bux became Minister-in-Charge of the Forest and Excise Departments in the Sind Cabinet in 1954. He later served in the sane capacity in the Refugees and Re-habilitation Departments, and also owns a Cotton Ginning Factory at Jhuluri.

Talpur’s grandson Nawab Mir lutafullah Khan Talpur was elected as an independent MPA in 1985 from Mirpurkhas District.
