= Pindrawal =

Town in Uttar Pradesh, India

Coordinates: 28°07′N 78°12′E

Pindrawal is a town in Bulandshahr district of Uttar Pradesh, India

== History ==
Pindrawal was a zamindari during British India belonging to dynasty Muslim community.

== Raja’s of Pindrawal ==
- Raja Mir Syed Muhammad Baquar Ali, Khan Bahadur, C.I.E.
- Raja Mir Syed Jafar Ali Khan Bahadur
- Raja Mir Syed Akbar Ali Khan Bahadur O.B.E.

Raja Mir Syed Muhammad Baquar Ali Khan was the board of trustees and also the founder vice president of the management committee of Muhammadan Anglo-Oriental College, Aligarh and he also donated a substantial amount of money to build Muhammadan Anglo-Oriental College, Aligarh. He also built and donated for Bulandshahr Town Hall.

== Nearest railway station ==
Atroli Road railway station is about 4 km away from Pindrawal.
