= Nawab Alam Yar Jung Bahadur =

Indian judge and politician (1890–1974)

Mir Alam Ali Khan Alam Yar Jung Bahadur
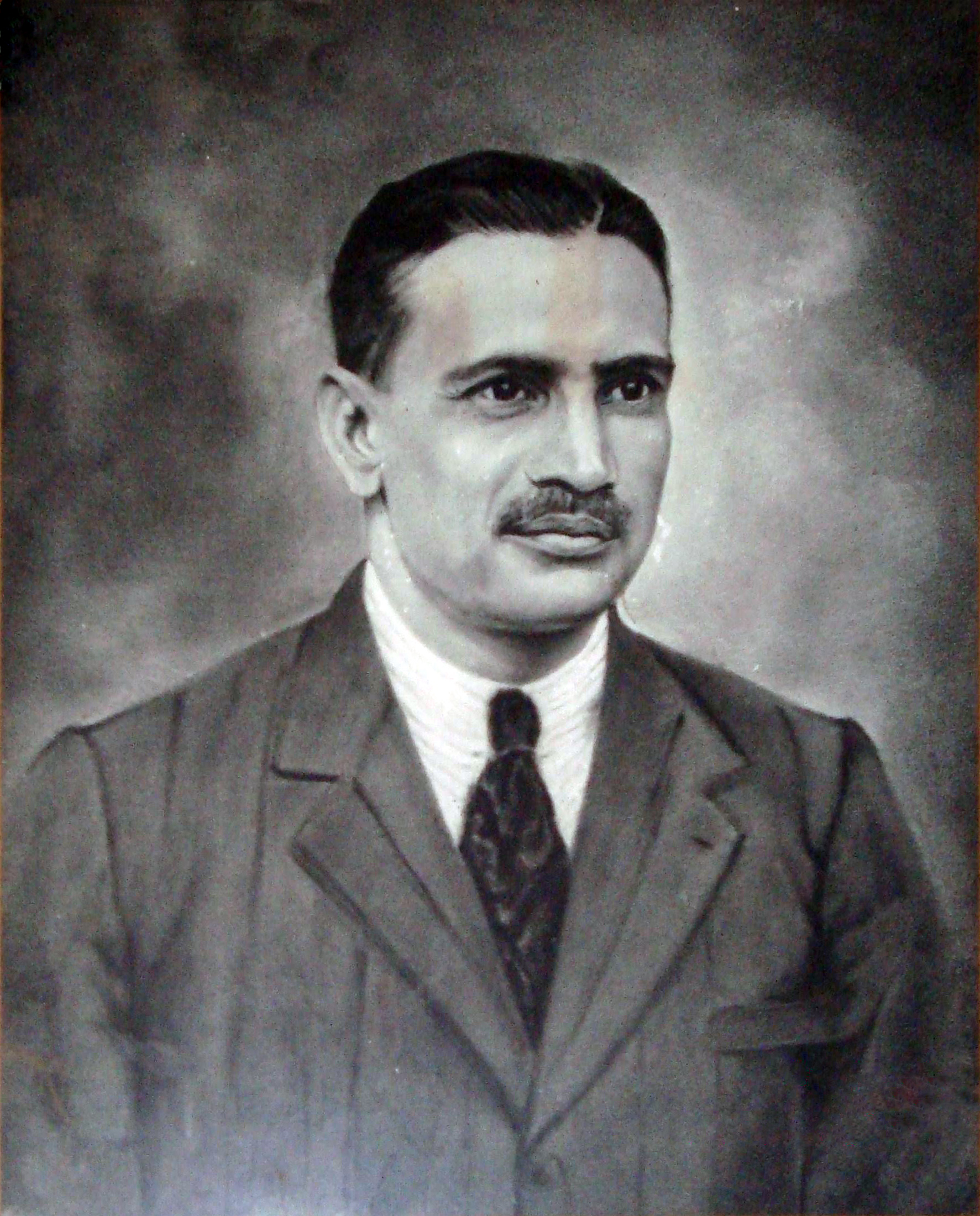
- Born: 23 April 1890; Hyderabad, Hyderabad State, British India
- Died: 25 February 1974 (aged 83); Hyderabad, Andhra Pradesh, India
- Education: Nizam College; Madras University; Lincoln College, Oxford
- Scientific career
- Fields: Law
- Workplaces: Courts of Hyderabad state

Mir Alam Ali Khan, also known by the honorific title Nawab Alam Yar Jung Bahadur, was an Indian judge and politician.

== Early life and education ==
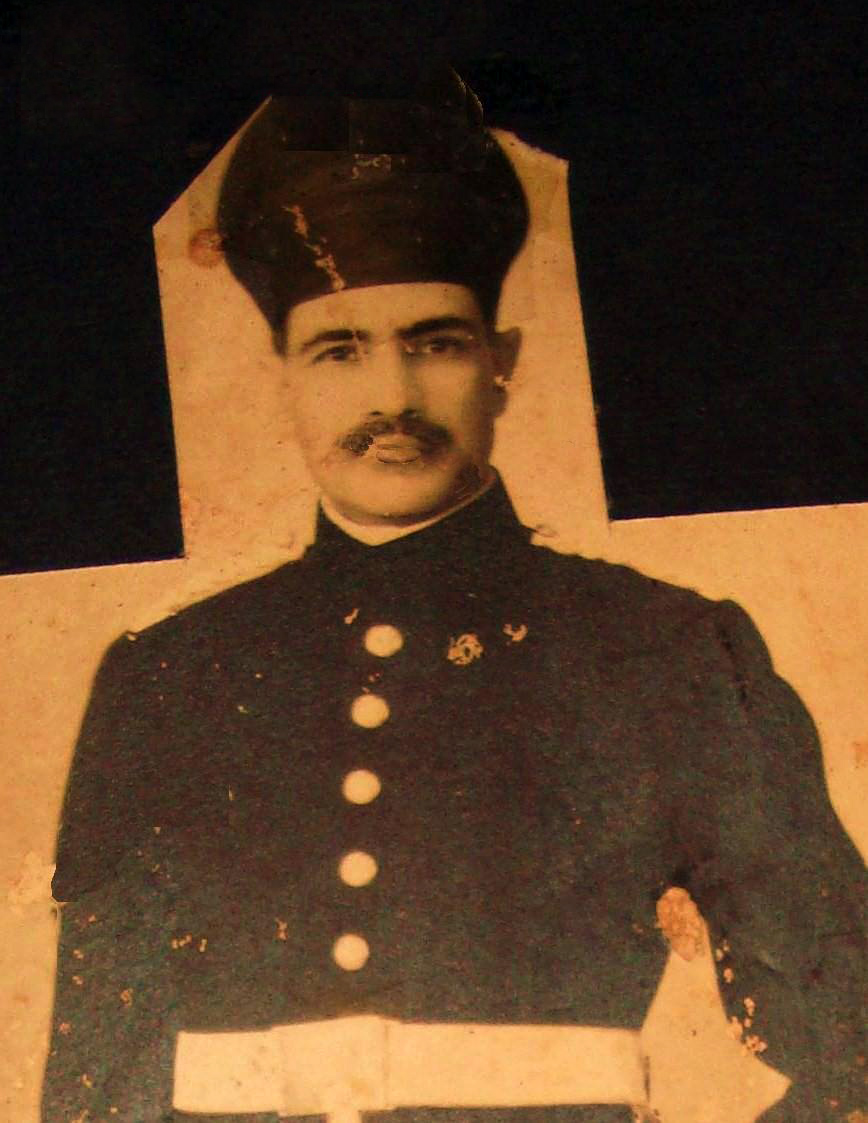
Nawab Mir Alam Ali Khan

Alam Ali Khan was the eldest son of Mir Hashim Ali Khan, a colonel with the Hyderabad Imperial Service Troops and Nizams regular Forces. Alam Ali Khan received education at Madrasa-e-aliya and the Nizam College, where he obtained both a B.A. and a B C L degrees. For a short period he served as a Cadet in the Army. Later, obtained his M.A from Madras University, subsequently, he moved to England to complete his education at Oxford University's Lincoln College here he attained his barrister-at-law and returned to Hyderabad.

== Civil service ==
Ali Khan was appointed Munsif-darj-e-awal (first session judge) for the court of Beerad and soon also became Nazim-Sardar-e-Adalat (inspecting officer) at the court of Gulbarga. For a long time he served as the inspecting officer for the courts of the Hyderabad State, and was later appointed Nazim-e-Sardar (Chief Justice). On 2 August 1943, Mir Alam Ali Khan was conferred the title Alam Yar Jung, the next day on 3 August the High court remained closed, in honour to felicitate and celebrate. After his retirement from his judicial offices, he was appointed as a judicial and religious member of HEH, the Nizams Executive council wherein he held the judicial portfolio.

== Family ==
Nawab Alam Yar Jung had three brothers and four sisters. The brothers included Nawab Talib Ali Khan, Accountant General of Hyderabad, Col Subhan Ali Khan, also Barrister at law Mir Iqbal Ali Khan Barr-at-lae . The sisters included Mehdi Begum, Tahira Begum and Wazir Begum.
