= Ismail Merathi =

Indian poest and educationist

- اسماعیل میرٹھی
- Born: Muhammad Ismail; 12 November 1844; Meerath, Mughal India
- Died: 1 November 1917; Meerath
- Occupations: Poet; teacher; educationist
- Years active: 1868–1917
- Era: Post-Independence War (1857)
- Known for: Urdu poems for children
- Notable work: Kulliyat-e-Ismail
- Spouse: Bibi Naeem Al-Nisa
- Children: 5
- Honours: Khan Sahib (1912)

Ismail Merathi (1844–1917) was an Indian Urdu poet, schoolteacher, and educationist from the Mughal–British era. His poems for children like Nasihat, Barsaat, Humaari Gaye, Subah Ki Aamad, Sach Kaho, Baarish Ka Pehla Qatra, Pan Chakki, Shafaq, and several others are part of the primary school curriculum in Pakistan. He wrote many Urdu and Persian text books for school-going children.

== Early life and education ==
Merathi was born as Muhammad Ismail on 12 November 1844, in Meerath, Mughal India. He was home-schooled by his father Sheikh Piir Bakhsh as well as well-known scholar of Farsi Mirza Rahim Beg Merathi. Later, he attended a formal school. He received higher education in Persian from Mirza Rahim Baig, a contemporary of Mirza Ghalib.

In 1868, he was appointed as a Persian teacher in a public school in Saharanpur district. Later, he was transferred to Agra in 1888. In 1899, he retired from the teaching job and returned to his home town Meerath.

== Literary career ==
Merathi started poetry when the Persian language was dominating both literature and culture in the Indian subcontinent. He initially wrote some Persian ghazals but later shifted to Urdu poetry. Influenced by Sir Syed Ahmed Khan's reforming movement and after reading an Urdu translation of some moral poems in English, he was motivated to write inspiring Urdu poems for kids. His first collection of poems Reza-e-Jawahar was published in 1885, which also included some translations from English poems. He also wrote several school textbooks for 1st to 5th-grade students.

In 1909, he founded a primary school Madrasa tul Banat for girls in Meerath which has been upgraded since then and now exists as Ismail National Mahila (PG) College Meerut.

== Style and themes ==
Merathi uses simple and easy-to-understand words in his poems for children. He expresses moral ideas in plain language and in a realistic tone. He refers to nature (mountains, rivers, dawn, rain, plants, etc.) and pet animals (cat, dog, horse, cow, and others) while conveying a moral message in his poems, thus making them appealing to a child's mind. Truth, hardworking, obedience, positive habits, and strong character are the central values emphasized in his poems.

== Personal life ==
Merathi was married to Bibi Naeem Al-Nisa, daughter of Sheikh Mehboob Bakhsh, in 1862. Both had three sons and two daughters together.

== Books ==
- Reza-e-Jawahar — Collection of poems published in 1885
- Kulliyat-e-Ismail — Collection of poems and ghazals published in 1910
- Urdu Zuban Ka Qayeda — The rule book of Urdu language for beginners
- Urdu Ki Pehli Kitab — The first-grade textbook of Urdu
- Urdu Ki Dosri Kitab — The second-grade textbook of Urdu
- Urdu Ki Teesri Kitab — The third-grade textbook of Urdu
- Urdu Ki Chauthi Kitab — The fourth-grade textbook of Urdu
- Urdu Ki Panchvein Kitab — The fifth-grade textbook of Urdu

== Honours ==
Merathi received the title of "Khan Sahib" for his literary and educational contributions from the British Government in 1912.

== Death ==
Merathi had chronic bronchitis due to heavy tobacco consumption. On 1 November 1917, he died at the age of 73 in Meerath.
