= Muhammad Baquar Ali Khan =

Honourable Raja Mir Syed Muhammad Baquar Ali Khan Bahadur II
- Born: Baquar Ali; 1842; Kotaha, Ambala district, British India
- Died: January 20, 1902 (aged 59–60); Pindrawal, British India
- Other names: Muhammad Baqar Ali Khan, Muhammad Bakir ali Khan, Muhammad Bakar Ali Khan
- Occupation: zamindar
- Known for: philanthropy, social reformer

Raja Mir Syed Muhammad Baquar Ali Khan Bahadur (1842–1902) C.I.E., The Mir of Kotaha and the Raja of Morni and Pindrawal, was a noted zamindar and philanthropist from Morni who lived in Pindrawal in United Province of British India.

== Early life ==
He was born in year 1842 in the noted Lalkhani branch of Muslim Rajputs. He was born to Quasim Ali Khan aka Kasim Ali Khan and Latif-ul-nissa. His father, Quasim Ali was son of Mir Akbar Ali, the Mir of Kotaha, while his mother was granddaughter of Raja Nahar Ali Khan and daughter of Akbar Ali Khan of Pindrawal.

== Mir of Kotaha ==
His grandfather Akbar Ali was the jagirdar of Kotaha (Kutaya), usually spoken of as the Mir of Kotaha, and enjoyed also a perpetual pension of Rs. 400 a year, granted in 1850, in return for the surrender of the right to levy transit duties within the limits of the Morni tract. His father Qasim Ali Khan II had died at Lahore in 1849-50. His grandfather, Meer Akbar Ali Khan had come under suspicion of British during Revolt of 1857 and Thomas Douglas Forsyth, Deputy Commissioner Umballa partially dismantled the Kotaha fort. The successor to him Melville was a bit lenient on Mir of Kotaha and taking advantage of this Akbar Ali rebuilt the fort without permission. But when James Stuart Tighe also known as Captain Tighe succeeded P. S. Melville as the Deputy Commissioner of Umballa in 1864 and the Mir came under the severe displeasure of the British Government on a charge of conspiracy, and ‘on an attempt to partially rebuild his fort at Kotaha without permission’. This led to demolition of fort and confiscation of their jagir. However, Meer Akbar Ali died in 1864 and young Bakir Ali succeeded him as Mir of Kotaha. Due to his young age he was spared and their jagir of Kotaha was restored to him but at the same time, he was banished from town. However, his whole property in Naraingarh was brought under direct official management. The Government cancelled the sentence of banishment and the property was finally restored to the Mir in 1880.

== Raja of Pindrawal ==
After death of his grandfather, Baquar Ali Khan inherited the title of Mir of Kotaha but due to banishment settled at Pindrawal in the Bulandshahr district of the North-West Provinces, where he had inherited a large zamindari property consisting of 365 villages, from her maternal side and was later given the title of Raja of Pindrawal. He also inherited large estates in Koil, Khair and Atrauli parganas of Aligarh district and Morthal estates in Budaun district.

== Philanthropist and educationist ==
Baquar Ali Khan was one of the visionaries who understood the value of education for up-liftment of Muslim community. He co-operated with Sir Syed Ahmad Khan in the foundation of the Muhammadan Anglo-Oriental College he was the founder vice president and also the board of trustee of the Muhammadan Anglo-Oriental College and he also donated a substantial amount of money to build Muhammadan Anglo-Oriental College at Aligarh. He also donated Rs. 30,000 towards the construction of the Bulandshahr Town Hall.

He was also a fellow of the Society of Arts, Great Britain.

== Honors ==
He was given title of Khan Bahadur and later created a Companion of the Most Eminent Order of the Indian Empire, on 1 January 1883 by the British government in recognition of his services.

== Death ==
Baquar Ali Khan died on 20 January 1902.

== Family ==
- Raja Mir Syed Muhammad Baquar Ali Khan, died leaving two sons: Raja Mir Syed Muhammad Jafar Ali Khan and Raja Mir Syed Muhammad Asghar Ali Khan. He was succeeded by the elder
- Raja Mir Syed Muhammad Jafar Ali Khan II, who built a fort at Atrauli, Aligarh district in 1909 that stands to date. He was succeeded by his son.
  - Raja Mir Syed Muhammad Asghar Ali Khan founded the Asgharabad Estate after the partition of Pindrawal Estate.
- Raja Mir Syed Muhammad Akbar Ali Khan II, O.B.E. (1896-1958) who became a member of the UP Legislative council in 1937. He was accorded kalgi and khilat by the Governor of Punjab in a special durbar at Sirhind. He had also inherited the family estates at Teori and Morthal, Uttar Pradesh. He built a hospital at Morni. Akbar Ali Khan also donated fund to start a scholarship at Aligarh Muslim University
