= Ganpatrao Narayanrao Madiman =

Indian businessman

Rao Sahib Ganpatrao Narayanrao Madiman (20 May 1879 – 10 May 1947) was a noted businessman, banker, cotton yarn and cloth Merchant from Hubli in the erstwhile Bombay Presidency of British India.

== Early life ==
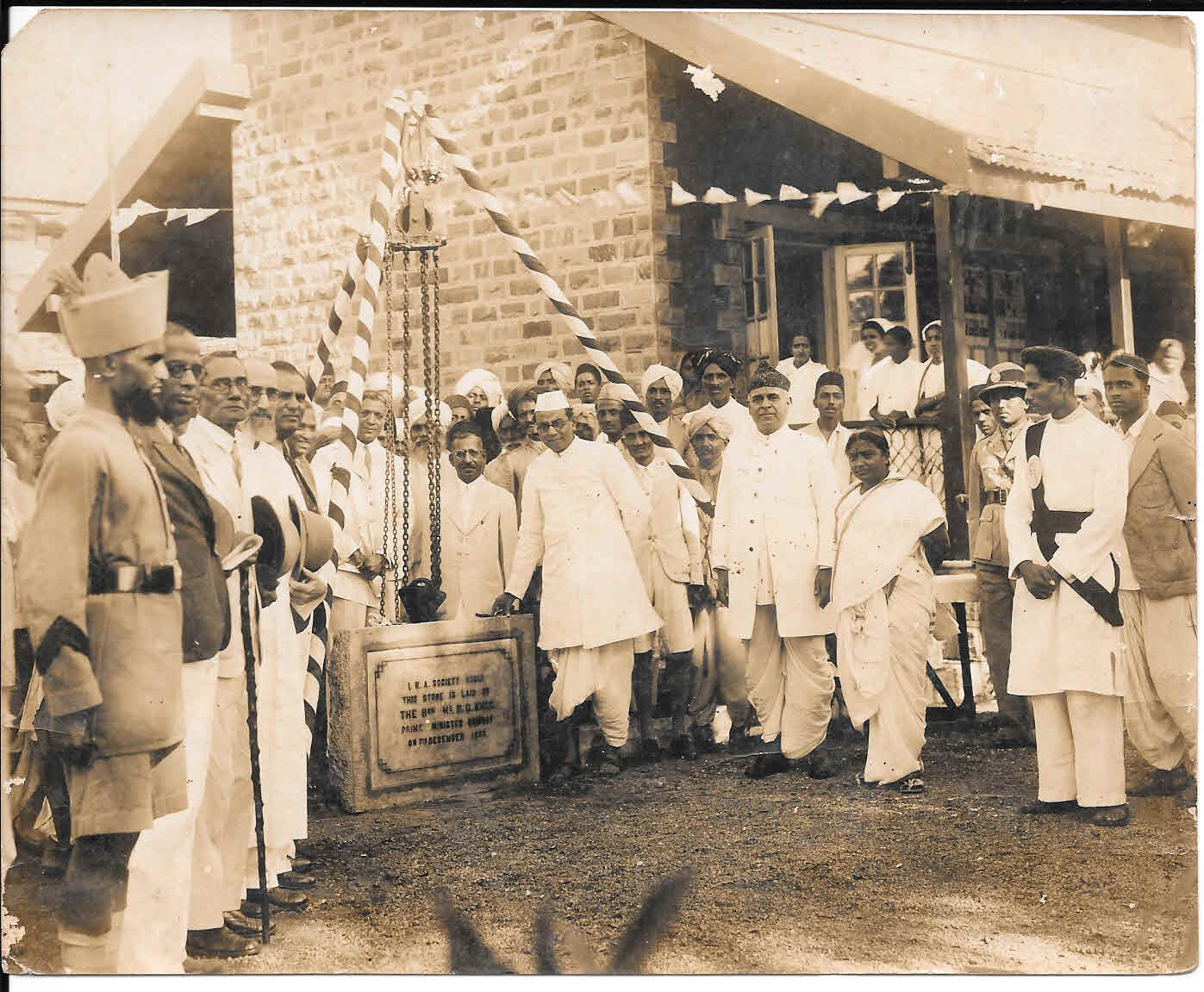
Rao Saheb Ganpatrao Madiman with the Prime Minister of Bombay Presidency Shri B.G.Kher, laying the foundation stone of the Woman's Hospital at Hubli in 1938

Madiman was born in a Chitrapur Saraswat Brahmin family of Canara region and did his early education at Sirsi and later at Hubli.

== Career ==
Madiman started his early career with mercantile service in Southern Mahratta Spinning and Weaving Company in 1897, serving under various capacities, but quit the service in 1907 to start his own business of cotton yarn and textiles under the name of M/S G.N.Madiman and sons, to later become a noted banker and businessman of the Hubli region. He served as magistrate for 1929-37 of Hubli and other posts like Village Munsiff and Chairman of Hubli Taluka War Gifts Fund Committee. He was a Director of the Hubli Electricity Co.Ltd., Member of the Taluka Local Board, Treasurer and member of the Indian Woman's Aid Society, one of the Trustees of the Hubli Co-Operative Hospital, Member of the District Finance Association, Broker of the Imperial Bank of India and a Member of the advisory board of the Kanara Industrial and Banking Syndicate Ltd.

== Personal life ==
Madiman was married to Laxmibai Amladi Vinekar from Kundapur and had three sons and two daughters.

He took an active interest in community service and was noted for his contributions to the Woman's Hospital, Shri Shiva Krishna Mandir, the Nagarkar Library, the J G College of Commerce, and the Maharashtra Mandal at Hubli.
