= Nawab Sirajul Islam =

Bengali politician

Khan Bahadur Nawab Sirajul Islam
- নবাব সিরাজুল ইসলাম
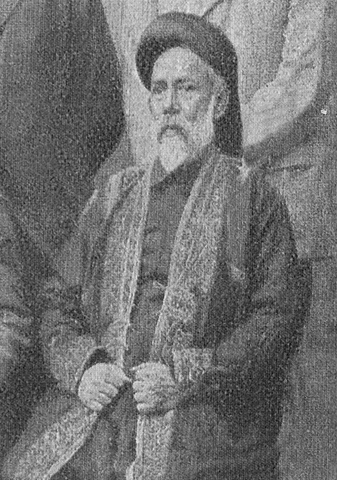

Member of the Bengal Legislative Council
- In office 1893–1902

Personal details
- Born: 1845 Pearakandi, Tipperah district, Bengal Presidency
- Died: 1923 (aged 77–78) Calcutta, Bengal Province
- Education: Dhaka College

Nawab Sirajul Islam (Bengali: সিরাজুল ইসলাম; 1845–1923) was a Bengali lawyer, activist and educational reformer.

== Early life and education ==
Sirajul Islam was born in 1845 to the Bengali Muslim Qazi family of Pearakandi in the Tipperah district of the Bengal Presidency (now Brahmanbaria District, Bangladesh). His father, Qazi Muhammad Kazem, served as a Ṣadr Amīn (revenue judicial officer) for the Company Raj. Sirajul Islam graduated from Dhaka College in 1867.

== Career ==
Sirajul Islam began his career as the assistant headmaster of the Pogose School.

He became a Calcutta High Court lawyer after completing his Bachelor of Law degree in 1873. In 1875, he was elected commissioner of the Calcutta Municipality. He became the assistant secretary of the Central National Muhamedan Association in 1885 and was made an honorary member of the Bengal Provincial Educational Conference. Sirajul Islam served as a member of the Bengal Legislative Council from 1893 to 1902. He was also nominated as a member of the syndicate body of the University of Calcutta.

In May 1912, the government of India formed the Nathan Committee to outline the plan for the recently announced University of Dacca. He was one of the committee's 13 members.

== Political views ==
Sirajul Islam was a supporter of Begum Rokeya and her campaign for the education of Muslim women. He had initially opposed the 1905 Partition of Bengal and the establishment of the University of Dacca, but later changed his mind regarding both matters.

== Honours ==
In 1887, the British Raj awarded him the title of Khan Bahadur. He was awarded the title of Nawab in 1911.

== Death ==
He died in 1923 in Calcutta. His family collection was donated to the University of Dhaka Library. Nawab Sirajul Islam Lane in Kolkata is named after him.
