= Mir Sher Muhammad Talpur =

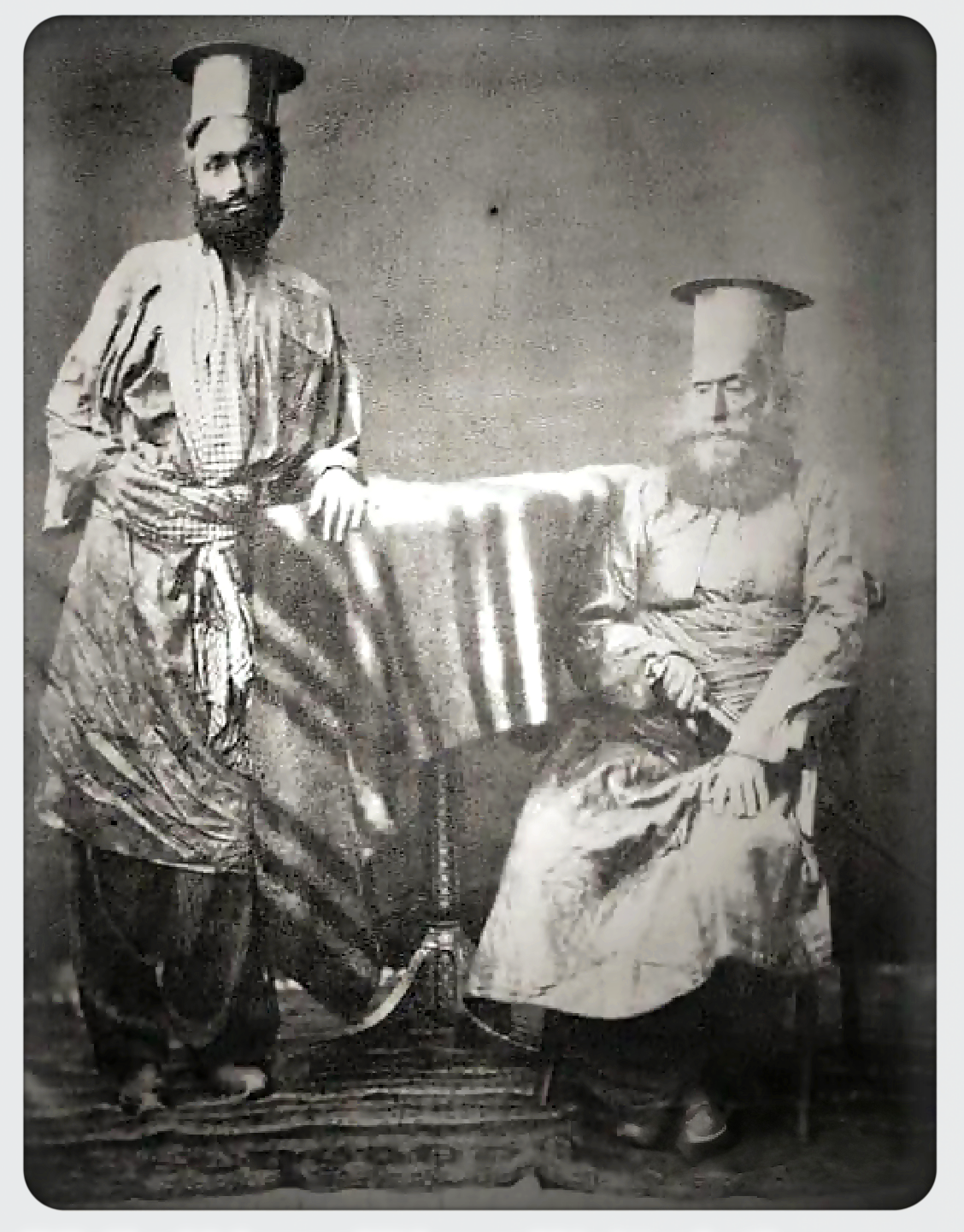
- Mir Sher Muhammad Talpur and his attendant

3rd Mir of Mirpur Khas
- Reign: 1829 – 24 March 1843
- Predecessor: Ali Murad Khan Talpur
- Successor: Position abolished
- Born: 1810; Mirpur Khas, Sind State
- Died: 24 August 1874 (aged 63–64)
- House: Manikani
- Dynasty: Talpur
- Father: Ali Murad Khan Talpur

Mir Sher Muhammad Talpur was the last Mir of Mirpur Khas who belonged to the Manikani house of the Talpur dynasty. The son of Mir Ali Murad Talpur, the founder of Mirpur Khas, he ascended the throne in 1829 and held onto it until he was defeated in the Battle of Hyderabad in 1843.

After becoming ruler of the Talpur dynasty, his reign saw a conflict with the British East India Company, who launched an invasion of the province of Sindh under the auspices of General Charles James Napier, aiming to annex the entire region. On 24 March 1843, troops under his command fought against a Company force in the Battle of Hyderabad; the British emerged victorious, and captured the city of Hyderabad soon after. Talpur then retreated into the countryside, where forces loyal to him and equipped largely with muskets waged a guerrilla campaign against the British, whose efforts to counter this led Napier to coin the word "counterinsurgency". He eventually died on 24 August 1874.

== See also ==
- Allahdad Talpur, Talpur’s son
- Imam Bux Talpur, Talpur’s grandson
