= Subordinate judge =

A subordinate judge (also called subjudge, sub judge, or sub-judge) is the judge of the subordinate court in the system of District Courts of India.
