= Joginder Singh Baidwan =

Indian athlete (1904–1940)

Joginder Singh
Personal information
- Born: 7 July 1904; Manakmasra, India
- Died: 1940 (aged 35–36); India
- Source: ESPNcricinfo, 24 October 2016

Major Sardar Joginder Singh Baidwan (7 July 1904 – 1940) was an Indian athlete. Born in Manakmajra in Ambala District, he was one of the greatest sportsmen that Patiala produced. He was educated at Aitchison's College "Chief's" Lahore and was married to the sister of Colonel Sardar Bahadur Joginder Singh Mann of Montgomery District.

He was introduced to the Maharaja of Patiala by his friend HH Raja Joginder Sen of Mandi and entered State service as ADC to HH Maharajadhiraj Bhupinder Singh. Later he became Commandant of the Rajindra Lancers in the Patiala State Forces, and was sometimes Military Secretary to HH Maharajadhiraj Bhupinder Singh of Patiala. He was Guardian to Yuvraj Maharajkumar Yadvinder Singh of Patiala.

He played in twenty-three first-class matches between 1923 and 1939. He was a member of the Indian cricket team that toured England in 1932, captained by the Maharaja of Porbandar. He was also a member of the "Patiala Tigers" polo team. He died in an automobile accident on his way back to Patiala from Nabha.
