= Nawab Bahadur =

Royal title in the Indian subcontinent

Nawab Bahadur was a title of honour bestowed during Mughal Empire and later during British Raj to Indian Muslim individuals for faithful service or acts of public welfare.

== Selected recipients ==
By the Mughal Empire:

- 1748: Javed Khan Nawab Bahadur (1695–1754), Chief Eunuch under Mughal Emperor of India, Muhammad Shah.

By the British Raj:

- 1886: Mir Osman Ali Khan (1886–1967), ruler of Hyderabad during 1911–1948.
- 1887: Nawab Abdul Latif (1828–1893), Bengal reformer, was bestowed the title by Viceroy Lord Dufferin on the occasion of Queen Victoria's Jubilee.
- 1892: Khwaja Ahsanullah (1846–1901) Nawab of Dhaka.
- 1896: Syed Walayet Ali Khan (1818–1899)
- 1903: Khwaja Salimullah (1871–1915), Nawab of Dhaka.
- 1924: Syed Nawab Ali Chowdhury (1863–1929), Bengali aristocrat, politician, and philanthropist.
- Bahadur Yar Jung (1905–1944), Hyderabadi politician.

== See also ==
- Baghatur
- Nawab
- Rao Bahadur
