= Rai Sahib =

Title of honour issued in British Raj

Rao Sahib
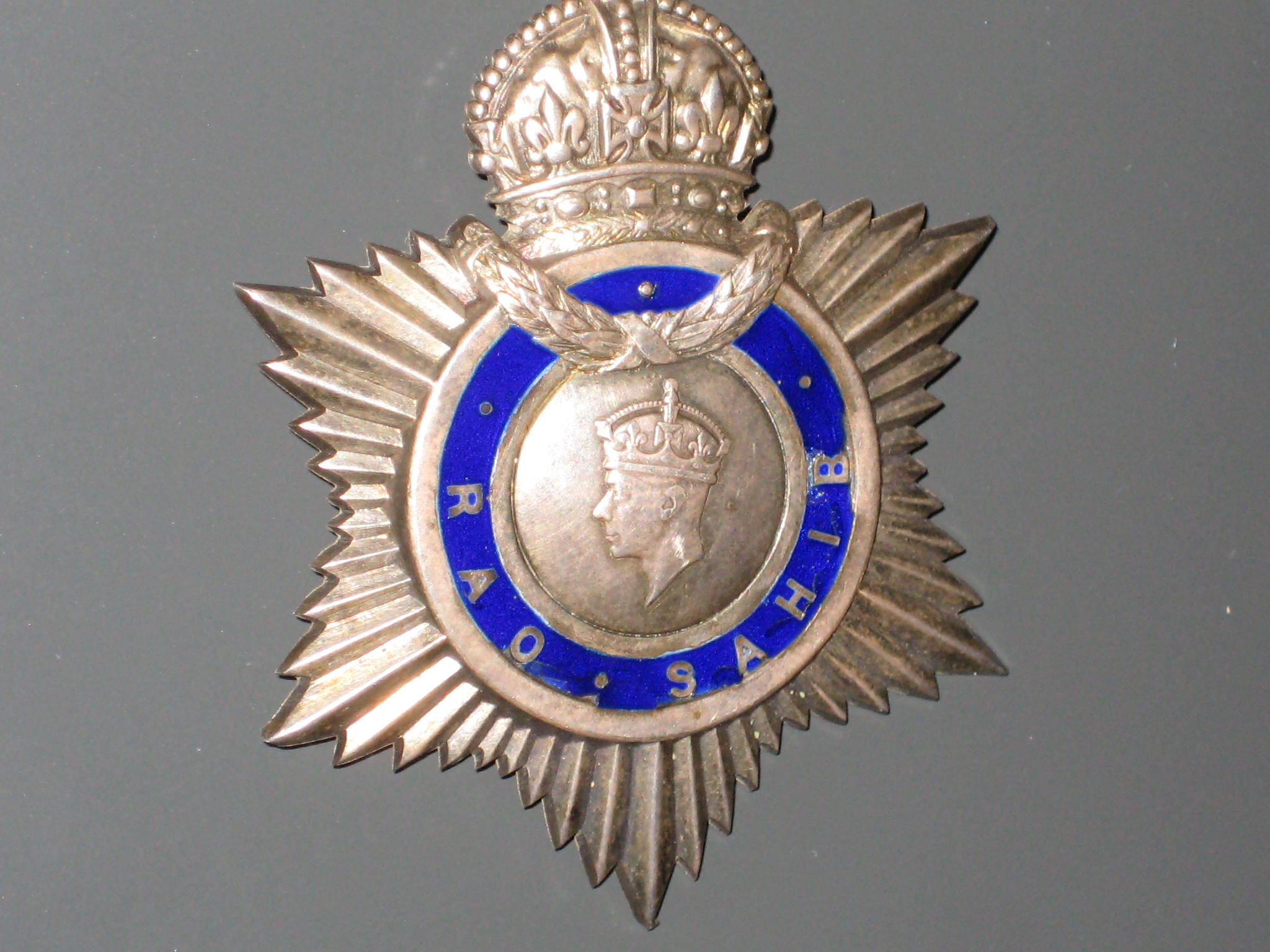
- Title Badge for Rao Sahib
- Type: Civilian Honour
- Country: British India
- Presented by: Viceroy of India
- Eligibility: Hindu Indian
- Status: Discontinued (since 1947)

Precedence
- Next (higher): Rao Bahadur

Rai Sahib / Roy Sahib / Rao Sahib (abbreviated R.S.) was a title of honour issued during the era of British rule in India to individuals who performed faithful service or acts of public welfare to the nation. From 1911 the title was accompanied by a special Title Badge. Translated, Rai means "King" Sahib means "Leader". Awarded during the reign of George VI. For another image of the badge see link This was the start level title usually awarded to civilians, which could later be upgraded to Rao Bahadur and then to Dewan Bahadur titles.

The title styled Rai Sahib were awarded to Hindu people of North India and styled Rao Sahib to Hindu people of South India, however, they were both of same category and spelling was altered to meet with regional differences of pronunciation.

The Rai Sahib/Rao Sahib/Roy Sahib and other similar titles issued during the British Raj were disestablished in 1947 upon independence of India.

== Recipients awarded the title ==
- Rai Sahib Bipin Bihari Sasmal – Eminent Zamindar, educationist, politician and Social Worker from Contai, elder brother of Birendranath Sasmal, was awarded the title in 1912.
- Rai Sahib Dina Nath - military officer and civil servant.
- Rao Bahadur Satyendra Nath Mukherjee, awarded Rai Saheb on 4 June 1934. He was the first Indian Origin Deputy Commissioner of Police, Calcutta.
- Rao Sahib Ayyathan Gopalan (Kerala, India) a.k.a. "Darsarji" – Doctor, chief surgeon, hospital superintendent and in charges, medical school professor who also served as the magistrate of Malabar region of Kerala (during British rule in India), social reformer of Kerala. Awarded on 17 November 1917 by British Government.
- Rai Sahib Bhagat Ram Sahni, founded the Arya Samaj movement in Srinagar, Jammu and Kashmir.
- Pandit Wazir Chand Trikha, Jhang, Pakistan (India) Chief Accounts Officer of Northern Railways.
- Nagendra Kumar Bhattacharyya Commissioner of Berhampore 1932–1948, Murshidabad District, West Bengal.
- Rao Sahib Katragadda Pedha Achaiah, Landlord, Amruthalur which is presently located in Guntur, Andhra Pradesh, India.
- Ramnath Goenka, Bombay – Newspaper editor and businessman.
- Mulji Jagmal Sawaria, Bilaspur, Chhattisgarh – Miner.
- A. Y. S. Parisutha Nadar, Thanjavur – Politician and industrialist.
- Deep Chand Bahman – Awarded Rai Sahib for the best saang.
- Abraham Pandithar – Tamil musicologist, composer and traditional medicine practitioner (2 August 1859 – 31 August 1919).
- Dinanath Atmaram Dalvi (1844–1897) Subordinate Judge Bombay Presidency, Senior Dakshina Fellow Elphinstone College Bombay, Fellow Bombay University and author of the book "An Examination of Sir Isaac Newton's Rule for Finding the Number of Imaginary Square Roots in an Equation".
- Dukhan Ram – Indian ophthalmologist, legislator and Padma Bhushan recipient.
- Mahabir Prasad Misra – Educator, Madhubani District, Dharbanga.
- Gidugu Venkata Ramamurthy – Telugu linguist.
- Ganpatrao Narayanrao Madiman – Businessman and banker from Hubli, Karnataka.
- Kashinath Krishna Kalkar – Deputy Collector of Amalner.
- Koovarji Karsan Rathor – Industrialist from Cuttack.
- Kuppusamy Kodandapani Pillai – Deputy Collector, Protector of Emigrants, Special Officer for South African Repatriates and Controller of Emigration from Madras.
- Harilal Shamji – Philanthropist and industrialist from Raigarh.

== See also ==
- Rao Bahadur
- Dewan Bahadur
- Raj Ratna
- Title Badge (India)
