= Order of British India =

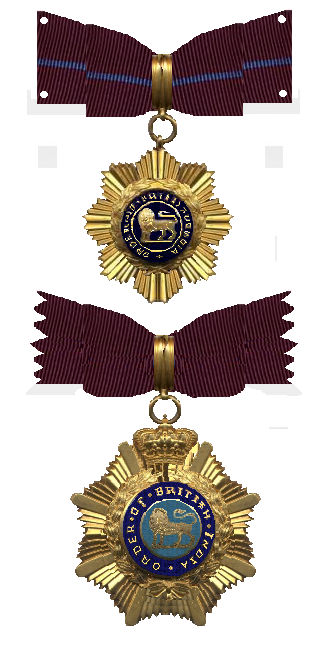
- Insignia of the Order, Second Class (above) and First Class, prior to 1939, (below)
- Type: Order of merit
- Awarded for: Long, faithful and honourable service
- Presented by: the British monarch
- Eligibility: Officers of the British Indian Army holding a Viceroy's commission, Indian Officers of Indian States Forces, Frontier Corps and Military Police
- Post-nominals: OBI
- Status: No longer awarded after 1947
- Established: 17 April 1837
- Ribbon 1837–1838 Ribbon 1838–1939 First Class ribbon 1939–1947 Second Class ribbon 1939–1947

Precedence
- Next (higher): Royal Red Cross (Class II)
- Next (lower): Kaisar-i-Hind Medal

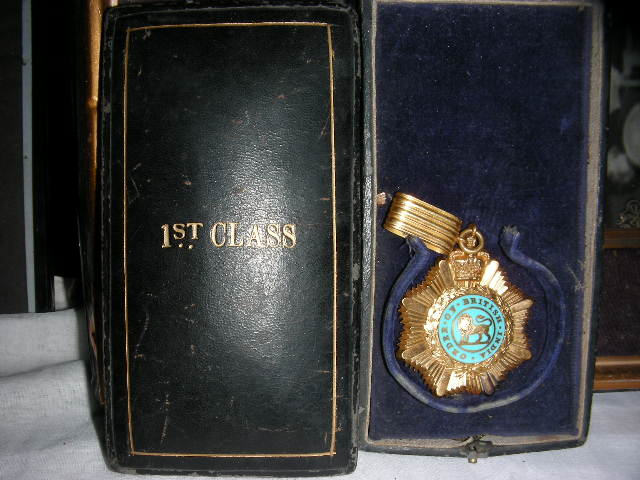
1st class Insignia of design awarded from 1939, with presentation case

The Order of British India was an order of merit established in 1837 by the East India Company for "long, faithful and honourable service". The company's powers were removed after the Indian Mutiny, and the Order was incorporated into the British Honours System in 1859. The order became obsolete in 1947, after the partition of British India into the Dominion of India and the Dominion of Pakistan.

== The Order ==
The Order of British India was awarded by the Viceroy of India for long, faithful and honourable service by Viceroy's Commissioned (i.e. native Indian) Officers in the Indian Army. While the Order could be awarded for distinguished service on a particular campaign, it was more often awarded to selected serving officers of between 20 and 30 years service.

=== Establishment ===
When first ordered by Lord William Bentinck in April 1837, the Order was intended as a means of providing recognition for serving Indian officers in the East India Company's military forces. These so-called "Native Officers" faced slow promotion under a system that was based on advancement through seniority. The 1st Class of the Order conferred the title of sirdar bahadoor on the 100 subedars and risaldars (senior Indian officer ranks) to whom membership was limited, plus an increase in salary of two rupees a day. Appointments to the 2nd Class, limited to a further 100 Indian officers of any rank, entitled the recipient to the title of bahadoor and a more modest wage increase. In an article published in the Calcutta Review in 1856 Henry Lawrence however expressed the opinion that the Order had become "virtually the reward of old age" with its wearers mostly limited to retired pensioners.

=== Later history ===
In September 1939 eligibility was extended to include native officers serving in the Indian States Forces, Frontier Corps and Military Police, and further extended in January 1944 to include native officers and Indian Warrant Officers in the Royal Indian Navy and the Hong Kong and Singapore Royal Artillery, as well as foreign officers, who could be appointed honorary members of the Order.

=== Appearance ===
The Order was awarded in two classes, both worn from a neck ribbon:
First Class. The badge consisted of a gold star 1.7 inches (43 mm) in diameter composed of rays of gold with in the centre the words ORDER OF BRITISH INDIA encircling a lion on a background of light blue enamel, surrounded by a laurel wreath, surmounted by a Crown. The enamel behind the wording was dark blue until 1939, when it was changed to the same light blue as appears behind the lion. Recipients of the first class were entitled to use the title Sardar Bahadur (heroic leader).
Second class. The badge comprised a slightly smaller gold star 1.5 inches (38 mm) in diameter of similar design to the first class, but without the crown and with the centre enamel in dark blue enamel. Recipients of the second class were entitled to the title Bahadur (hero).

Holders of both classes could use the post-nominal letters OBI.

All initial awards to the Order were in the second class, with appointments to the first class made from existing members of the second class.

The ribbon was originally sky-blue, but changed to dark red in 1838 after it was found that the hair oil favoured by Indian soldiers stained the ribbon. From September 1939 the first class ribbon had two thin light blue strips added towards the centre of the dark red ribbon, while the second class had one light blue stripe added to the centre of the ribbon.

Pakistan awarded the Order to a small number of seconded British officers who rendered outstanding services at the time of independence.

== Recipients ==
The following is an incomplete list of people appointed to the Order of British India:

=== First Class ===
Recipients of the first class were entitled to use the title Sardar Bahadur (heroic leader) and could use the post-nominal letters OBI.

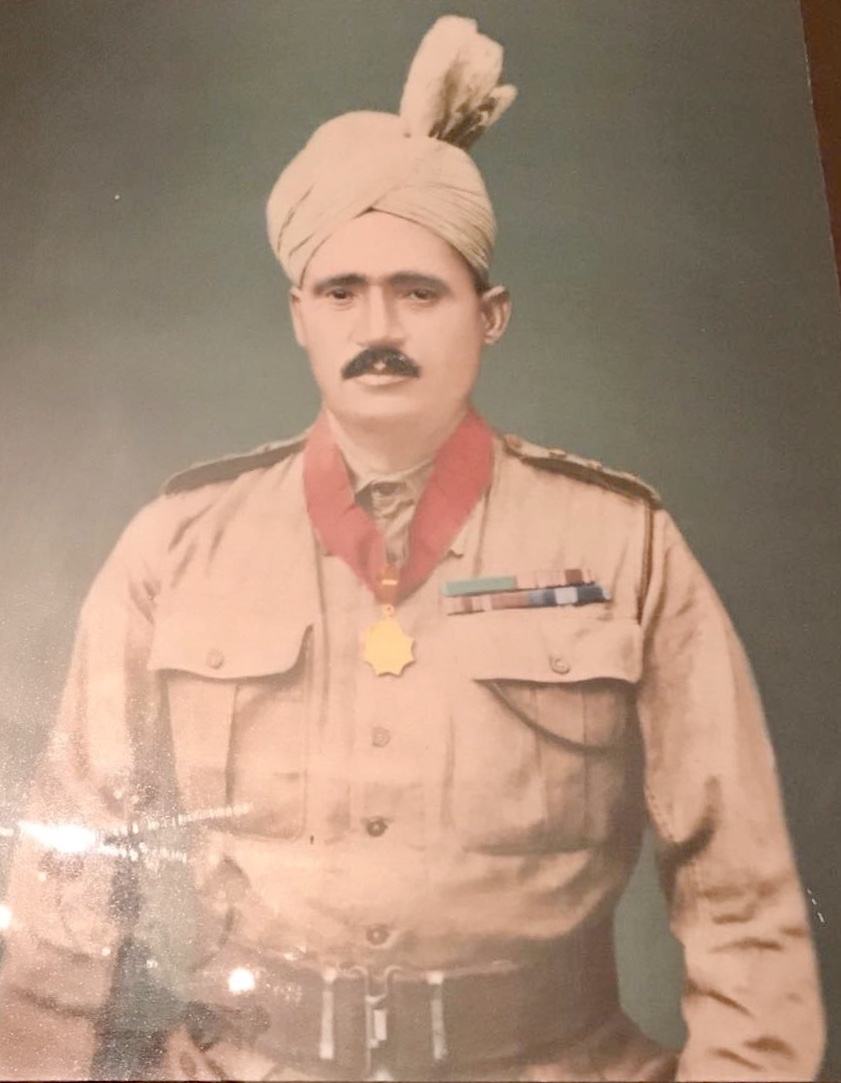
Hony. Captain Muhammad Khan

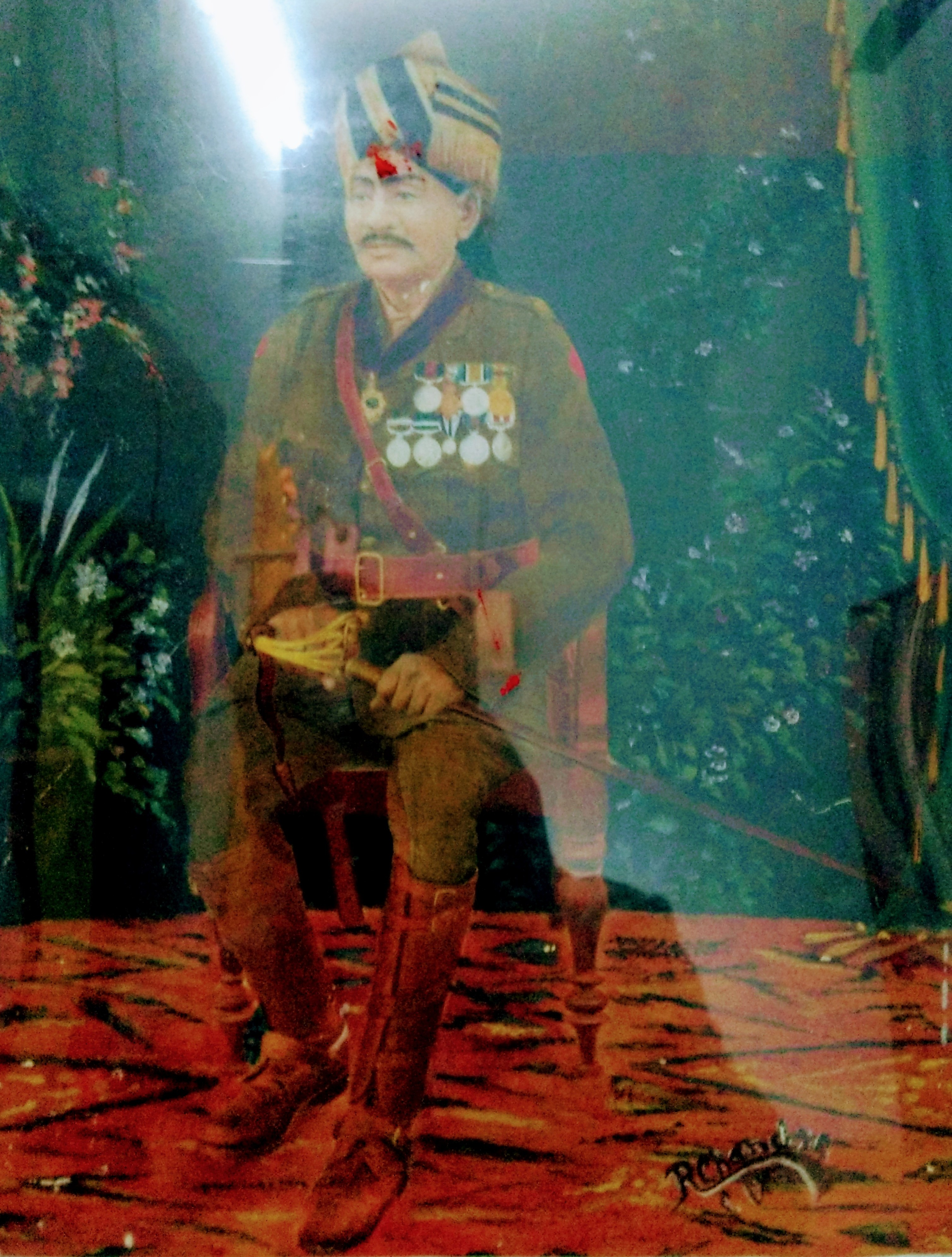
Sub-Maj Bahadur Multani Ram

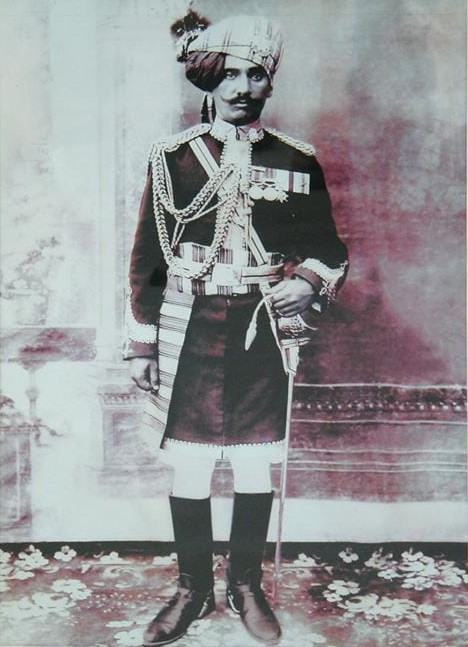
Col. Balu Singh

1st Class recipients of Order of British India.
- Major General Bakhshish Singh, Military Secretary Patiala (14 June 1912)
- Honorary Captain Ganpat Singh Rathore MBE
- Honorary Captain Kishen Singh Grewal of Kila Raipur
- Honorary Captain Fateh Muhammad, I.O.M, 3/12 Frontier Force Regiment (4 June 1929)
- Captain Ghulam Mohi-ud-din Khan I.D.S.M, 5/1st Punjab Regiment.
- Captain Ranjeet Singh Rura Sirsa, MBE, 1st field regiment
- Major Daud Khan, Commandant Alwar State Lancers (1904)
- Captain Gardhara Singh Minhas
- Colonel Thakur Bahadur Singh Bagawas
- Honorary Captain Muhammad Khan, 10th Baluch Regiment.
- Subedar Major Bahadur Multani Ram, IDSM, Faizabad Cantonment (1920).
- Unjur Tiwari, 1st Bengal Native Infantry. Spied for British forces during the Indian Mutiny.
- Colonel Rao Bahadur Thakur Balu Singh ji Inderpura, IDSM
- Nawab Mir Hashim Ali Khan, Col Hahsim Nawaz Jung, SB, (1897).
- Lieutenant Raja Paindah Khan, 1/14 Punjab Regiment.Chief of Mohra Rajgan village Jhelum.
- Captain Moovera Kalappa, 71st Coorg Rifles,
- Major-General Raja Jeoraj Singh, of Sandwa, CBE, Bikaner State Forces, Member, Executive Council, Bikaner State, Rajputana.
- Captain Raja Feroz Khan, Frontier Force Rifles.
- Major General Fateh Naseeb Khan, Commander-in-chief, Alwar State Forces (17 January 1929)
- Captain Khan Bahadur Masbahuddin Ahmed, Zamindar of Fuldi Estate, Bengal
- Honorary Captain Bhola Singh Gulia, Indian Survey Regiment of Badli, Haryana, India.
- Honorary Captain Ghafur Khan, IDSM late 4/15th Punjab Regiment.
- Honorary Lieutenant Pehlwan Khan MBE, Bronze Star Medal.
- Tiku Singh Thapa, KPM, CM, 2nd in Command, Gurkha Military Police.
- Honorary Captain Bakhshi Jagat Singh, 16th Bengal Cavalry.
- Honorary Captain Taj Mohammad Khan, IDSM, Poona Horse.
- Honorary Captain Jawala, IOM, 14th Sikh Pioneers.
- Honorary Captain Jawala, IOM, 14th Sikh Pioneers.

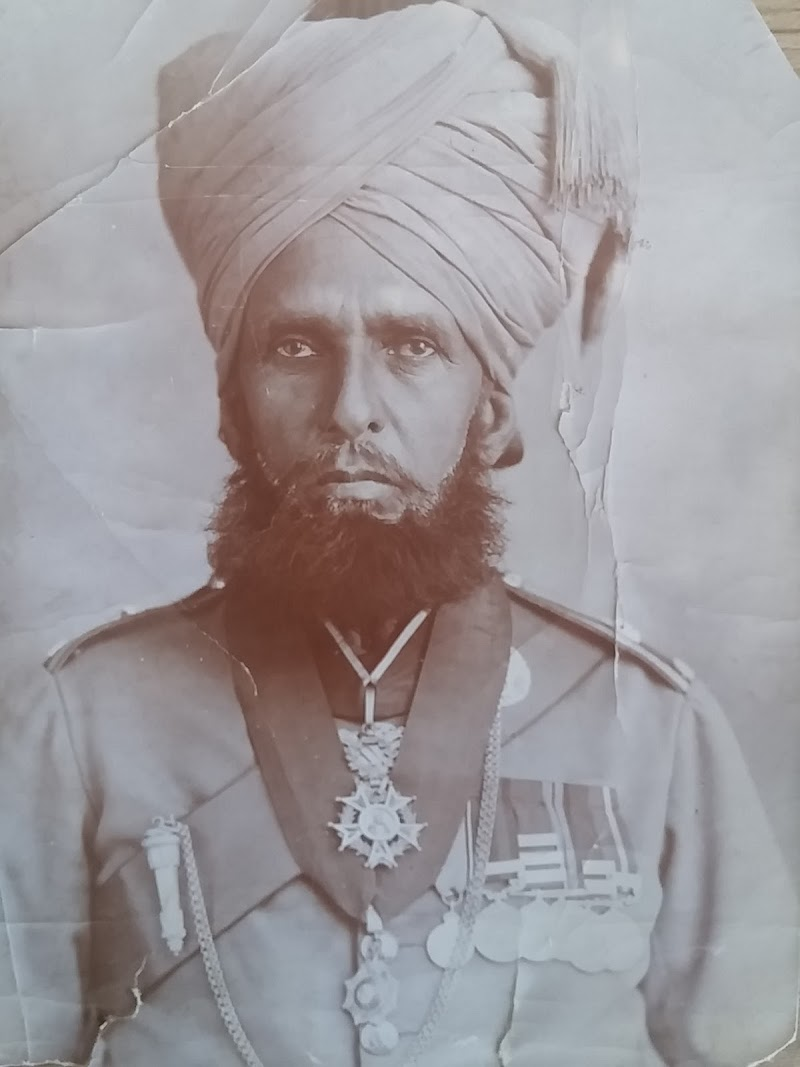
Honorary Captain Zaman Ali Khan, Sardar Bahadur, OBI, RVM

- Honorary Captain Zaman Ali Khan, Sardar Bahadur, OBI (1st Class 1902), IOM, RVM (5/14th Punjab Regiment)
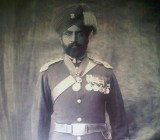
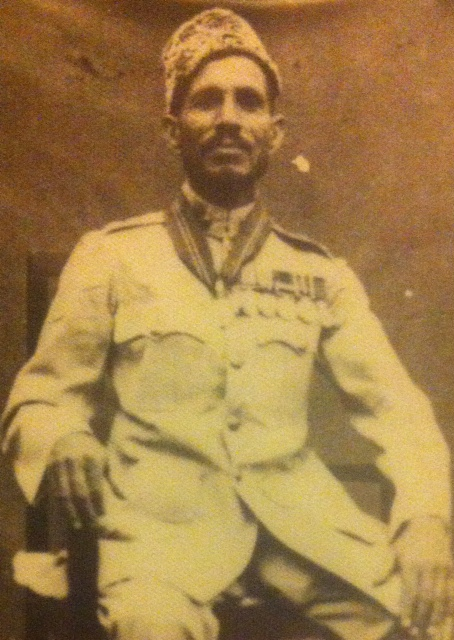
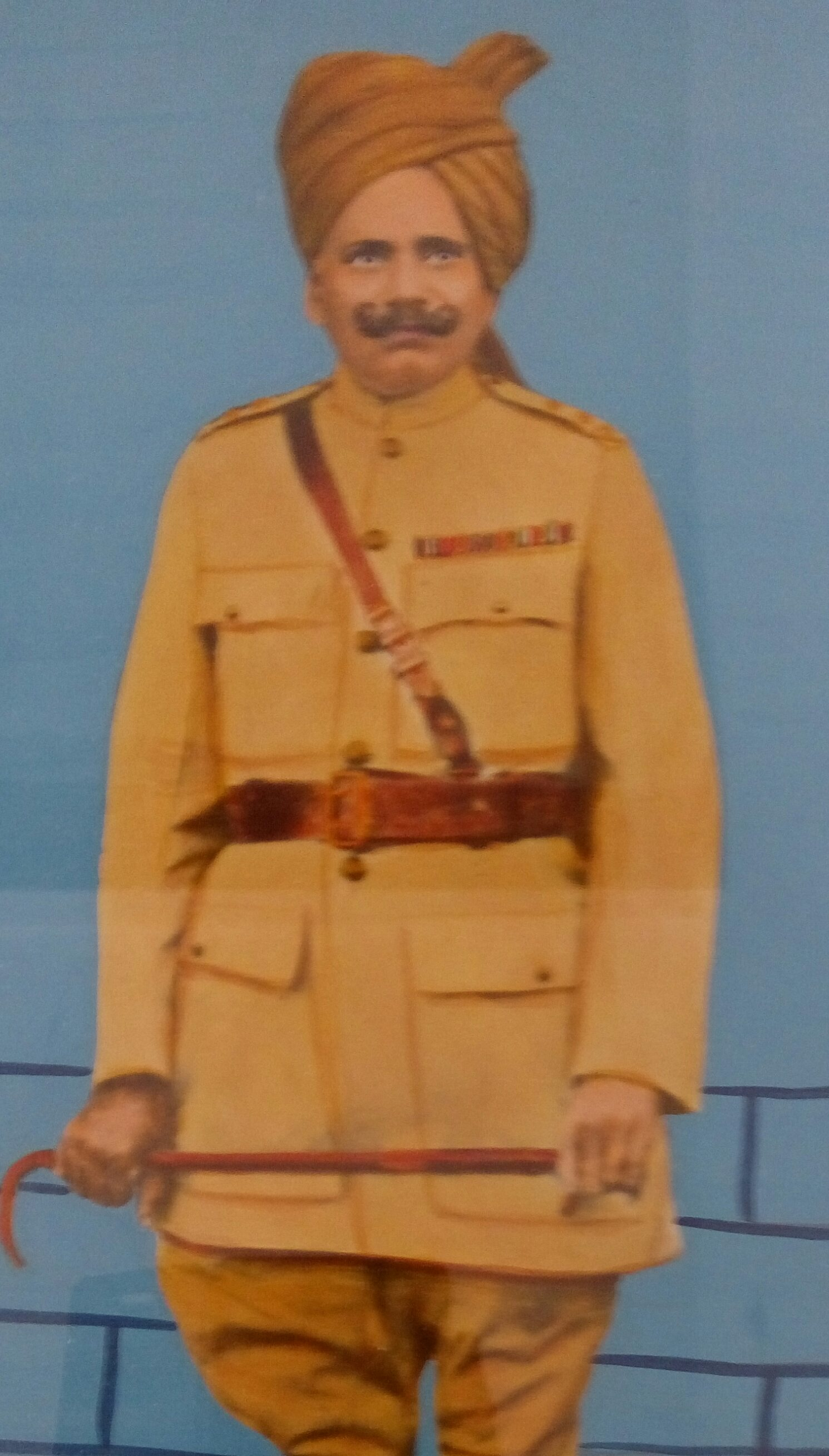
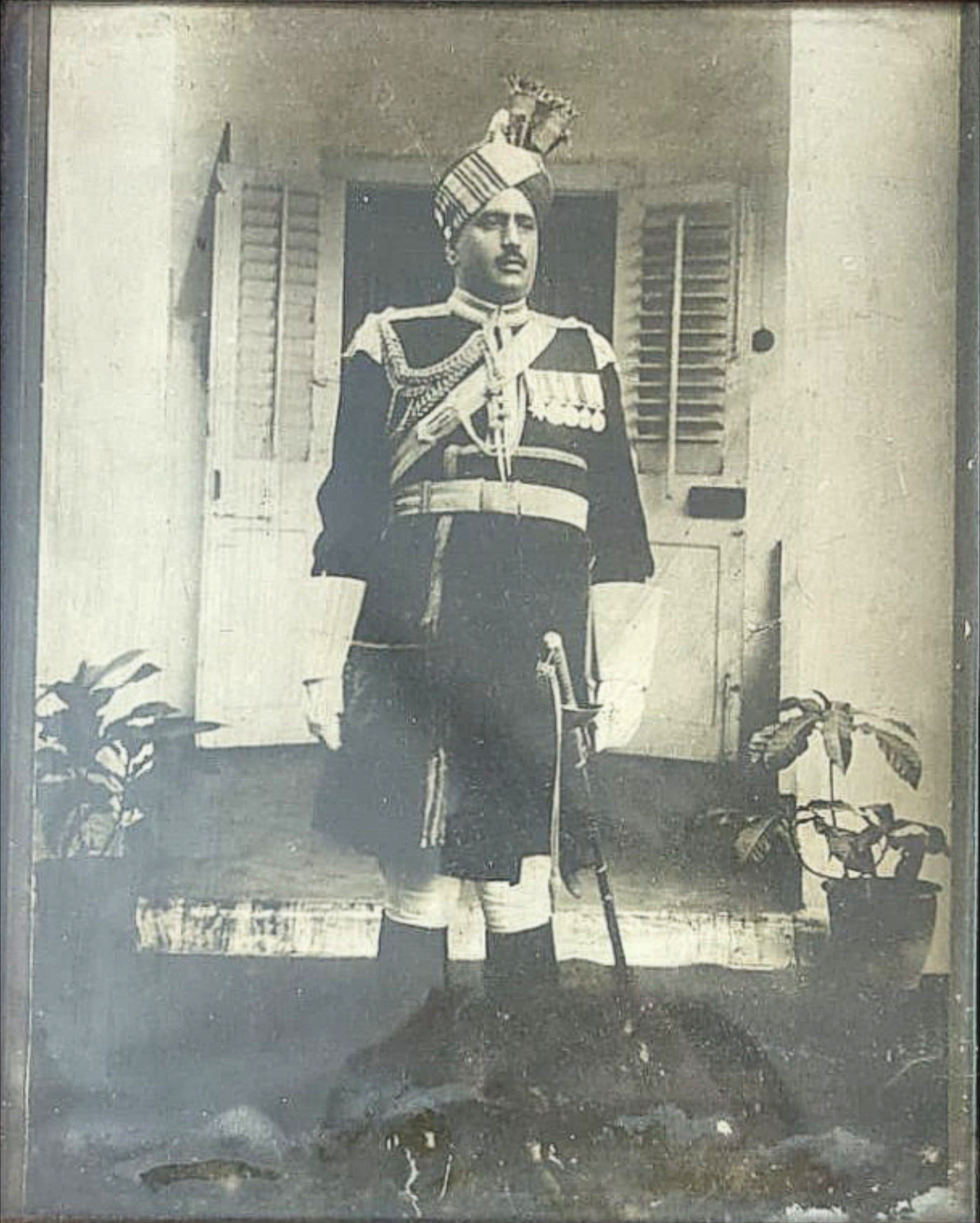
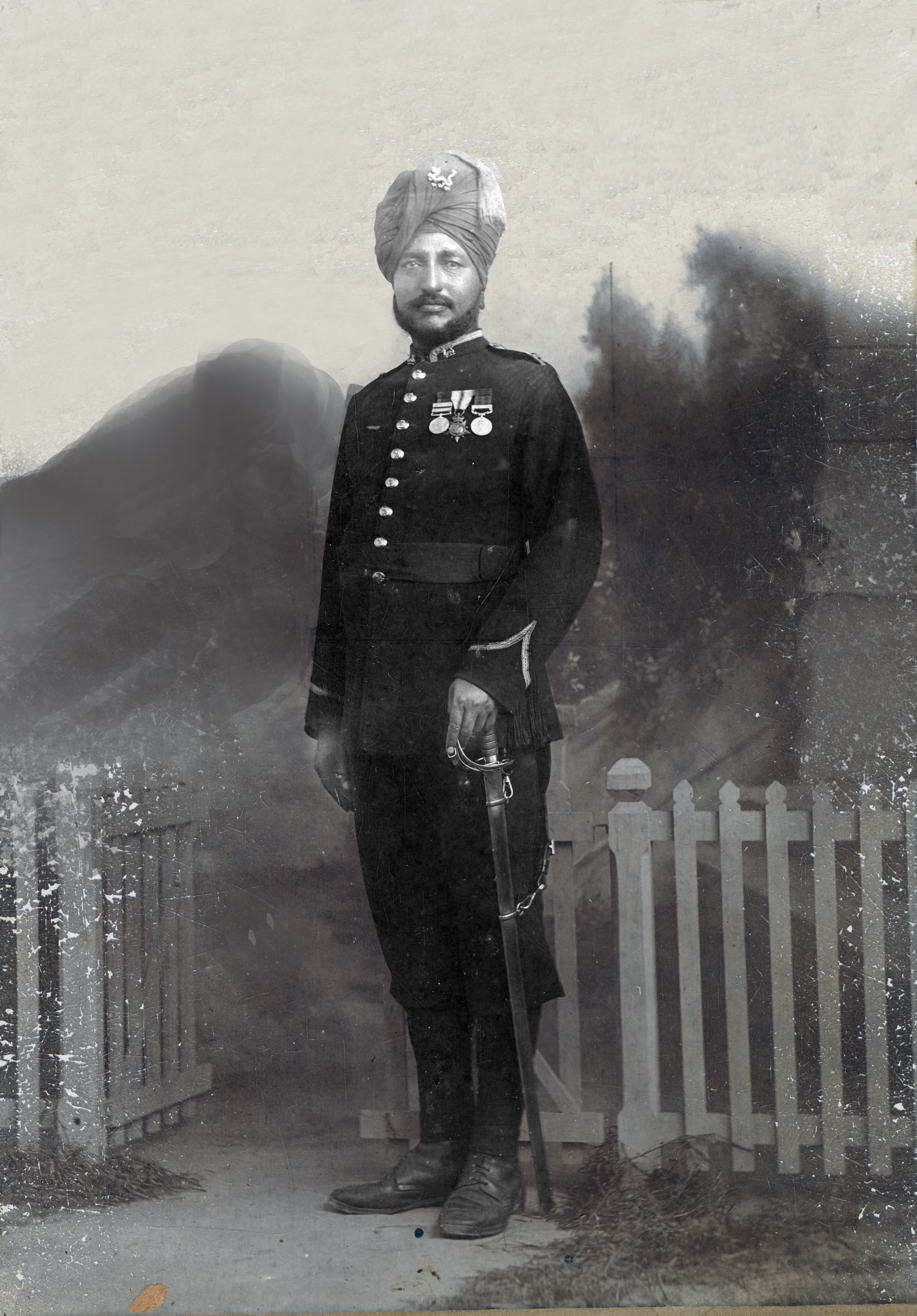
1st class recipients. Clockwise from upper left: Hony. Capt Mihr Din, Hony. Lt Pehlwan Khan, Hony. Capt Rewat Singh, Sub-Maj Purshotam Dass, Hony. Capt Khub Singh.

=== Second class ===
Recipients of the second class were entitled to the title Bahadur (hero) and could use the post-nominal letters OBI.

- Risaldar Nadir Ali Khan, Bamba Rajput, 9th Hodson's Horse.
- Risaldar-Major Prem Singh, 20th Deccan Horse (26 August 1916)
- Honorary Captain Inayat Ullah Asmie, 10 Baluch Regiment.
- Subedar-Major Jagindar Singh, IOM
- Subedar Major Purshotam Dass, 74th Punjabis (16 April 1911)
- Honorary Lieutenant Ram Singh Kaila, IOM, 82nd Punjabis.
- Commandant Narain Singh Hundal, Kapurthala State Forces.
- Risaldar Mir Dad Khan Tarin of 9th Hodson Horse.
- Honorary Subedar-Major Amar Nath Puri, Indian Medical Department (1942).
- Honorary Lieutenant Ganga Dat, 2nd Lancers.
- Subedar Syed Nazar Mohammad Shah
- Subedar Major Hasan Khan, 128th Pioneers (3 June 1916).
- Risaldar Khub Singh, 29th Lancers.
