= Malik Mihr Khan =

British Indian Army honorary captain (died 1963)

Sardar Bahadur Risaldar-major Malik Mihr Khan OBI IOM IDSM
- ملک مہر خان

Personal details
- Died: 2 July 1963 Murree, Pakistan
- Children: Nur Khan

Military service
- Branch/service: British Indian Army
- Years of service: 1911–1945
- Rank: Risaldar-major; Honorary Captain
- Unit: 15th Lancers (Cureton's Multanis) (1911-1920); 20th Lancers (1920-1945)
- Battles/wars: World War I; Western Front; Mesopotamian campaign; East Persia Cordon
- Awards: See list

Malik Mihr Khan (Note: Punjabi: ملک مہر خان; Also spelled as Malik Mehr Khan) (died 2 July 1963) was an Honorary Captain of the British Indian Army. He was the father of Air Marshal Nur Khan.

== Military career ==
Malik Mihr Khan joined the British Indian Army as a Viceroy's commissioned officer (VCO) Jemadar on 1 April 1911 in the 15th Lancers (Cureton's Multanis).

He served in France and Belgium in World War I from 23 September 1914 to 29 January 1916, during which he was awarded the Indian Order of Merit (Second Class). The regiment was transferred to Mesopotamia where Khan served from 30 January 1916 to 26 March 1916. While serving in the East Persia Cordon, he was promoted to Ressaidar on 3 September 1918 and awarded the Indian Distinguished Service Medal on 15 November 1919. He participated in operations in the Persian gulf from 26 April 1919 to 27 May 1919. On 21 September 1920, the 14th Murray's Jat Lancers and the 15th Lancers (Cureton's Multanis) merged to form the 20 Lancers.

He was promoted to Risaldar-Major of the 20th Lancers on 27 May 1927. He was appointed Aide-de-Camp (ADC) to General Officer Commanding Eastern Command (India), Sir John S.M. Shea on 1 May 1928. He was also the ADC to his successor General Norman MacMullen.

In May 1931, four Indian officers, described as "the cream of the Indian Army", arrived in London to serve as the King's Bodyguard. Risaldar Major Malik Mihr Khan was among them.

He was promoted to Honorary Lieutenant on 1 August 1931 and Honorary Captain on 1 August 1935. He was admitted to Order of British India with the title of Sardar Bahadur on 4 June 1935.

He was appointed as an honorary aide-de-camp to Governor of the Punjab, Henry Duffield Craik, on 18 August 1940. He also served as one of the Indian aide-de-camps to his successor, Governor Bertrand Glancy, from 1943 to 1945.

== Later life and death ==
Malik Mihr Khan was awarded the Tamgha-e-Khidmat on Pakistan Day in 1960, while serving as President District Ex-Servicemen's Association in District Attock.

He died in Murree on 2 July 1963 from a protracted illness.

== Dates of rank ==
| Rank | Date |
|---|---|
| Jemadar | 1 April 1911 |
| Ressaidar | 6 June 1918 |
| Risaldar | 3 September 1918 |
| Risaldar Major | 27 May 1927 |

== Awards and decorations ==
- Indian Order of Merit (Second Class), 1 January 1916
- Indian Distinguished Service Medal, 15 November 1919
- Mentioned in despatches, 13 March 1920
- Order of British India with the title of Sardar Bahadur, 4 June 1935
