= Sardar Lehna Singh =

Lehna Singh
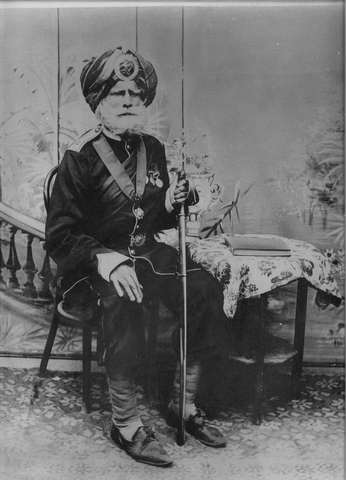
- Subedar Major Sardar Lehna Singh, Sardar Bahadur at the 1911 Delhi Durbar
- Born: 1825
- Died: 1916 (aged 90–91); Amritsar, Punjab, India
- Spouse: Ganga Devi
- Military career
- Allegiance: British Raj
- Branch: British Indian Army
- Service years: 1853–1893
- Rank: Honorary Captain Subedar Major
- Unit: 45th Rattray's Sikhs
- Conflicts: Indian Mutiny; Second Anglo-Afghan War; Hazara Expedition of 1888
- Awards: Order of British India, First Class; Indian Order of Merit

Sardar Lehna Singh, Sardar Bahadur, OBI, IOM (1825–1916) was a British Indian Army soldier and the Chief of the village Lehna Singhwala (now located in present-day Punjab, Pakistan).

== Personal life and family ==
Sardar Lehna Singh was born in 1825 to S. Ganga Ram.

Singh began serving in the British Indian Army at the age of 28. He served in the 45th Rattray's Sikhs under Captain Thomas Rattray for 40 years from 1853 till 1893.

Singh married Ganga Devi and together they had five sons. He was the father of Risaldar Major Labh Singh, Kripa Singh, Lachhman Singh, Kesar Singh and Bhagwan Singh.

After his retirement, Singh was awarded land by the British Raj on which to a build a village in his name, which was named Lehna Singhwala (in Lahore district).

Singh died at the age of 91 in Amritsar, Punjab, India.

== Military career ==
Sardar Lehna Singh served under the 45th Rattray's Sikhs during the Indian Mutiny of 1857–58. He partook in the Jyntah and Khasia Hills campaign, Afghan campaign 1878–80 and Zhob Valley Expedition of 1884. His final expedition was the Hazara campaign of 1888.

For his service, Singh was awarded the Indian Order of Merit.

On 13 April 1890, the Viceroy of India awarded Sardar Lehna Singh the Order of British India 1st Class for his merit, faithful and honourable service to the British Raj. As a recipient of the Order of British India, he was entitled to use the title "Sardar Bahadur".

In December 1911, at the coronation of George V, Sardar Lehna Singh was promoted to the rank of Honorary Captain Subedar Major.

== State Honours ==
- British India:
  - Indian Order of Merit
  - Order of British India
