= Ganda Singh Datt =

British Indian Army soldier (1830–1903)

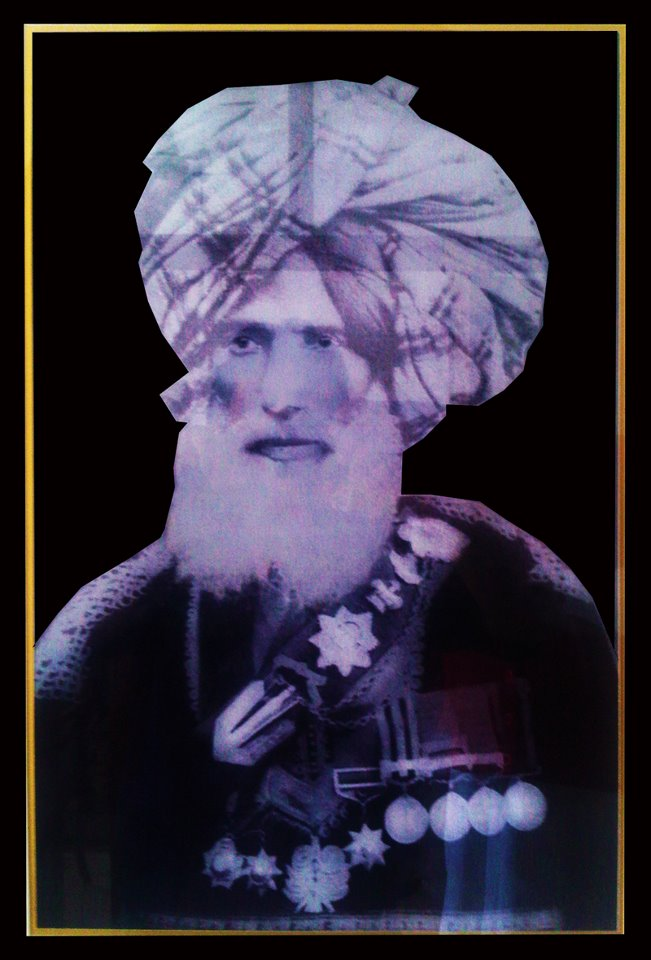
- Sardar Bahadur Risaldar Major Ganda Singh Datt
- Born: 1830; Sialkot
- Died: July 1903 (aged 72–73)
- Military career
- Allegiance: British India
- Branch: British Indian Army
- Rank: Risaldar Major
- Unit: 19th Regiment of Bengal Lancers
- Conflicts: Indian Mutiny; Second Opium War; Second Anglo-Afghan War: Battle of Kandahar
- Awards: Indian Order of Merit

Sardar Bahadur Risaldar Major Ganda Singh Datt, IOM (1830 – July 1903) was a decorated soldier in the British Indian Army, who served in the 19th Regiment of Bengal Lancers (also known as Fane's Horse).

Ganda Singh was a Mohyal Brahmin of the Datt clan. He belonged to the village of Zaffarwal Dattan in Tehsil Rayya of District Sialkot. The Pakistani town of Ganda Singh Wala on the border with India is named in his honour.

== Family ==
Ganda Singh did not have a son, but he passed on the heritage to his daughter Bhagan Devi. Her sons, Sardar Amar Singh and Sardar Shamsher Singh, rose to make an empire with Amritsar Sugar Mills, Amritsar. Amritsar Sugar mills, Rohana (UP), a very reputed Amrit Bank and the large tract of land in Amritsar. Sardar Amar Singh's sons, icons in their own right, Shyam Singh, Bakshi Hardev Singh, Narinder Singh Bakshi and Beant Singh Vaid looked after the immense business empire. Sardar Shamsher Singh's son, Sampuran Singh Vaid was also actively involved in it. There were two daughters, Bimla Rani, married to DSP Bakshi Rajpal Chibber and Urvashi married to Jagjit Singh Bali. Bakshi Hardev Singh, architect, philosopher and an artist, also took charge of the Amrit Bank. Till they were all nationalized. His son, Atul Bakshi, is a reputed Indian Glass artist.

Ganda Singh's extended family featured many other eminent persons as well. His cousin, Bakshi Prem Singh Vaid, was a decorated soldier in the British Indian Army as well, and so was his son Bakshi Tirath Ram Vaid. His maternal grandson, Dr. Baldev Singh Vaid, was a famous neurologist who was awarded the Padma Bhushan by the Indian government, and whose son-in-law, K. K. Bakshi, was a decorated air vice marshal of the Indian Air Force.

Ganda Singh's grand-nephew, Sardar Sant Singh Datt, who was Chief Resident of Kalsia State. Sardar Sant Singh Datt's son, Major General Kalwant Singh, was a senior commander in the Indian Army.

== Military career ==
Singh enlisted as a dafadar in 1852 and served as a soldier over 50 years. He received the Indian Order of Merit for having saved the life of Sir Robert Sandeman at Lucknow at the time of the Sepoy Mutiny of 1857. Subsequently, in the Second Anglo-China War, he saved the life of Sir Charles MacGregor as well.

Later in the Afghan Campaign of the British Indian Army, Singh participated in the famous march to Kandahar and distinguished himself in the Battle of Kandahar, becoming an Honorary Captain. He was eventually appointed aide-de-camp to Lord Roberts of Kabul and Kandahar, the then Commander-in-Chief of the British Indian Army.

Singh was rewarded with large tracts of agricultural land, and the village Ganda Singh Wala on the periphery of Amritsar is named after him. He was president of the first All India Mohyal Conference held in 1902 at Lahore, and was among the select veteran Indian soldiers presented to the British Royals in the Coronation Durbar held in Delhi in January 1903.
