= Bakshi Tirath Ram Vaid =

- Born: Bakshi Tirath Ram Vaid; 1857; Rawalpindi, Punjab, British India
- Died: 1924 (aged 66–67)
- Military career
- Allegiance: British India
- Branch: British Indian Army
- Service years: 1876–1909
- Rank: Risaldar Major and Honorary Captain
- Unit: Queen's Own Corps of Guides
- Conflicts: North-West Frontier: Siege of Malakand
- Awards: Order of British India, Second Class; Indian Order of Merit, Third Class

Sardar Bahadur Risaldar Major and Honorary Captain Bakshi Tirath Ram Vaid, OBI, IOM (1857–1924), also known as Tirath Ram, was a decorated soldier of the British Indian Army.

Vaid enlisted in the ranks of the Queen's Own Corps of Guides on 1 May 1876.

As a ressaidar with the Queen's Own Corps of Guides cavalry, Vaid was awarded the Indian Order of Merit, Third Class for gallantry displayed at the Siege of Malakand in 1897, where he fought against a much larger force of Afghan tribesmen. He was also rewarded with large tracts of agricultural land in District Lyallpur for his contributions.

Vaid was decorated with the Order of British India, Second Class, with the title of Bahadur on 24 September 1904. He retired from the Indian Army and was appointed honorary captain on 1 February 1909.
