= Jemadar Jai Lal =

- Born: Rohtak, Punjab Province (present day Haryana, India)
- Military career
- Allegiance: British India
- Branch: British Indian Army
- Rank: Jemadar
- Unit: 9th Bhopal Infantry
- Conflicts: First World War
- Awards: Indian Order of Merit (1st & 2nd Class)

Jemadar Jai Lal was an Indian officer in the British Indian Army who was awarded the Indian Order of Merit (IOM), First Class, for his gallantry during the First World War. He distinguished himself during the Battle of Istabulat in Mesopotamia on 21 April 1917, when the Regiment having suffered heavy casualties (200 men including all officers except him) and some of the men begun to withdraw, this Indian officer, on his own initiative, recalled them, led them forward in the face of severe fire, and retook some of the ground lost.

== Military service ==
Jai Lal served as a Jemadar in the British Indian Army during the First World War. He took part in the Mesopotamian campaign, where British and Indian troops fought against the Ottoman Empire.

== Two awards of the Indian Order of Merit ==
Background to the Indian Order of Merit

Till 1911, the IOM was the only gallantry award for which native soldiers in the British Indian Army were eligible. It existed in three classes, and was often thought of as the equivalent of the Victoria Cross. In 1911, Indians became eligible for the Victoria Cross, which replaced the First class of the IOM, while the other two classes remained in place for next many years.

Jai Lal's awards

- His first IOM (2nd Class) was awarded for gallantry during the Action at Sannaiyat in Mesopotamia in February 1917.
- His second IOM (1st Class) was awarded for gallantry during the Battle of Istabulat on 21 April 1917, where he rallied troops under heavy fire and helped recover lost ground.

== Citations ==
For conspicuous gallantry, resource, and devotion to duty in action on April 21, 1917, in Mesopotamia. The Regiment having suffered heavy casualties and some of the men having begun to withdraw, this Indian officer, on his own initiative, recalled them, led them forward in the face of severe fire, and retook some of the ground lost.
