= Mangal Pandey =

Indian soldier and freedom fighter (1827–1857)

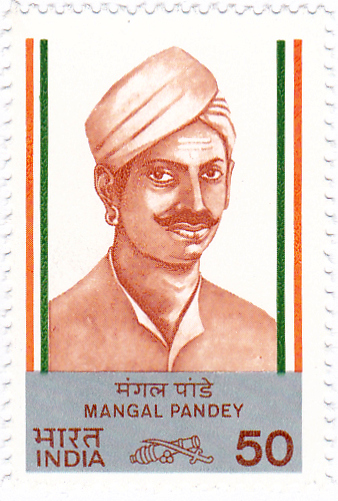
- Depiction of Pandey on a 1984 Indian stamp
- Born: Unknown; Nagwa, Ceded and Conquered Provinces, Company Raj
- Died: 8 April 1857 (aged 30); Barrackpore, Bengal Presidency, Company Raj
- Cause of death: Execution by hanging
- Known for: Playing a key role in events preceding the Indian Rebellion of 1857
- Military Career
- Allegiance: East India Company
- Branch: Bengal Army
- Service years: 1849–1857
- Rank: Sepoy
- Unit: 34th Bengal Native Infantry

Mangal Pandey (died 8 April 1857) was an Indian soldier who played a key role in the events that led to the Indian Rebellion of 1857, which resulted in the dissolution of the East India Company and the beginning of the British Raj through the Government of India Act 1858. He was a sepoy in the 34th Regiment of the Bengal Native Infantry. In 1984, the Republic of India issued a postage stamp in his memory. His life and actions have also been portrayed in several Indian cinematic productions.

== Early life ==
Mangal Pandey was born into a Brahmin family from Nagwa, a village of upper Ballia district, Ceded and Conquered Provinces (now in Uttar Pradesh) .

Pandey had joined the Bengal Army in 1849. In March 1857, he was a private soldier (sepoy) in the 5th Company of the 34th Bengal Native Infantry.

== Mutiny ==
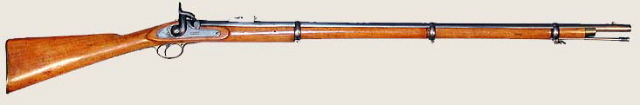
Enfield Rifle

On the afternoon of 29 March 1857, Lieutenant Baugh, Adjutant of the 34th Bengal Native Infantry, then stationed at Barrackpore was informed that several men of his regiment were in an excited state. Further, it was reported to him that one of them, Mangal Pandey, was pacing in front of the regiment's guard room by the parade ground, armed with a loaded musket, calling upon the men to rebel and threatening to shoot the first European that he set eyes on. Testimony at a subsequent enquiry recorded that Pandey, unsettled by unrest amongst the sepoys and intoxicated by the narcotic bhang, had seized his weapons and ran to the quarter guard building upon learning that a detachment of British soldiers was disembarking from a steamer near the cantonment.

Baugh immediately armed himself and galloped on his horse to the lines. Pandey took position behind the station gun, which was in front of the quarter-guard of the 34th, took aim at Baugh and fired. He missed Baugh, but the bullet struck his horse in the flank bringing both the horse and its rider down. Baugh quickly disentangled himself and, seizing one of his pistols, advanced towards Pandey and fired. He missed. Before Baugh could draw his sword, Pandey attacked him with a talwar (a heavy Indian sword) and closing with the adjutant, slashed Baugh on the shoulder and neck and brought him to the ground. It was then that another sepoy, Shaikh Paltu, intervened and tried to restrain Pandey even as he began to reload his musket.

A British Sergeant-Major named Hewson had arrived on the parade ground before Baugh, summoned by an Indian naik (corporal). Hewson had ordered Jemadar Ishwari Prasad, the Indian officer in command of the quarter-guard, to arrest Pandey. To this, the jemadar stated that his NCOs had gone for help and that he could not take Pandey by himself. In response Hewson ordered Ishwari Prasad to fall in the guard with loaded weapons. In the meantime, Baugh had arrived on the field shouting 'Where is he? Where is he?' Hewson in reply called out to Baugh, 'Ride to the right, sir, for your life. The sepoy will fire at you!' At that point Pandey fired.

Hewson had charged towards Pandey as he was fighting with Lieutenant Baugh. While confronting Pandey, Hewson was knocked to the ground from behind by a blow from Pandey's musket. The sound of the firing had brought other sepoys from the barracks; they remained mute spectators. At this juncture, Shaikh Paltu, while trying to defend the two Englishmen called upon the other sepoys to assist him. Assailed by sepoys who threw stones and shoes at his back, Shaikh Paltu called on the guard to help him hold Pandey, but they threatened to shoot him if he did not let go of the mutineer.

Some of the sepoys of the quarter-guard then advanced and struck at the two prostrate officers. They then threatened Shaikh Paltu and ordered him to release Pandey, whom he had been vainly trying to hold back. However, Paltu continued to hold Pandey until Baugh and the sergeant-major was able to get up. Himself wounded by now, Paltu was obliged to loosen his grip. He backed away in one direction and Baugh and Hewson in another, while being struck with the butt ends of the guards' muskets.

=== Intervention of General Hearsey ===
In the meantime, a report of the incident had been carried to the commanding officer of the garrison Major-General John Bennet Hearsey, who then galloped to the quarter-guard with his two officer sons. It was now late afternoon and off-duty sepoys from the 43rd BNI, another regiment forming part of the Barrackpore brigade, had joined the crowd on the parade ground. While all were unarmed, Hearsey saw the possibility of general mutiny and sent orders to British troops to assemble at the Governor-General's residence.

Taking in the chaotic scene at the bell-of-arms (arsenal) of the 34th BNI, Hearsey then rode up to the guard, drew his pistol and ordered them to do their duty by seizing Mangal Pandey. The General threatened to shoot the first man who disobeyed. The men of the quarter-guard fell in and followed Hearsey towards Pandey. Pandey then put the muzzle of the musket to his chest and discharged it by pressing the trigger with his foot. He collapsed bleeding, with his regimental jacket on fire, but not mortally wounded.

With British and Indian officers now in control of the situation Mangal Pandey, "shivering and convulsed", was taken to the regimental hospital for treatment under guard.

== Execution ==
Pandey recovered and was brought to trial less than a week later. He was sentenced to death by hanging, along with Jemadar Ishwari Prasad, after three Sikh members of the quarter-guard testified that the latter had ordered them not to arrest Pandey.

Mangal Pandey's execution took place on 8 April 1857, before all of the Indian and British units stationed in Barrackpore. The Delhi Gazette of 18 April described the hanging in some detail, stating that Pandey had refused to make any disclosures and that the occasion "had a most disheartening effect upon the sepoy regiments upon the ground".

Jemadar Ishwari Prasad was separately executed by hanging on 21 April. In contrast to the silent Mangal Pandey, the jemadar expressed regret for his actions and urged the sepoys present to obey their officers in future.

=== Aftermath ===
A scene from the 1857 Indian Rebellion

The seven (out of ten) companies of the 34th B.N.I. Regiment stationed at Barrackpore on 29 March were disbanded "with disgrace" on 6 May as a collective punishment after an investigation by the government: for failing to perform their duty in restraining a mutinous soldier and in assisting their officers. That came after a period of six weeks while petitions for leniency were examined in Calcutta. Sepoy Shaikh Paltu was promoted to havildar (sergeant) and decorated with the Indian Order of Merit for his behaviour on 29 March, but he was murdered in an isolated part of the Barrackpore cantonment shortly before most of the regiment was discharged.

The Indian historian Surendra Nath Sen notes that the 34th B.N.I. had a good recent record and that the Court of Enquiry had not found any evidence of a connection with unrest at Berhampore involving the 19th B.N.I. four weeks before (see below). However, Mangal Pandey's actions and the failure of the armed and on-duty sepoys of the quarter-guard to take action convinced the British military authorities that the whole regiment was unreliable. It appeared that Pandey had acted without first taking other sepoys into his confidence but that antipathy towards their British officers within the regiment had led most of those present to act as spectators, rather than obey orders.

== Motives ==
The personal motivation behind Mangal Pandey's behaviour remains confused. During the incident itself he shouted to other sepoys: "come out – the Europeans are here"; "from biting these cartridges we shall become infidels" and "you sent me out here, why don't you follow me". At his court-martial, he stated that he had been taking bhang and opium, and was not conscious of his actions on 29 March.

There were a wide range of factors causing apprehension and mistrust in the Bengal Army immediately prior to the Barrackpore event. Pandey's reference to cartridges is usually attributed to a new type of bullet cartridge used in the Enfield P-53 rifle which was to be introduced in the Bengal Army that year. The cartridge was thought to be greased with animal fat, primarily from cows and pigs, which could not be consumed by Hindus and Muslims respectively (the former a holy animal of the Hindus and the latter being abhorrent to Muslims). The cartridges had to be bitten at one end before use. The Indian troops in some regiments were of the opinion that this was an intentional act of the British, with the aim of defiling their religions.

Colonel S. Wheeler of the 34th B.N.I. was known as a zealous Christian preacher. The wife of Captain William Halliday of the 56th B.N.I. had the Bible printed in Urdu and Hindi and distributed among the sepoys, thus raising suspicions amongst them that the British were intent on converting them to Christianity.

The 19th and 34th Bengal Native Infantry were stationed at Lucknow during the time of the annexation of Oudh in 1856 because of alleged misgovernment by the Nawab. The annexation had negative implications for sepoys in the Bengal Army (a significant portion of whom came from that princely state). Before the annexation, these sepoys had the right to petition the British Resident at Lucknow for justice – a significant privilege in the context of native courts. As a result of the East India Company's action, they lost that special status, since Oudh no longer existed as a nominally independent political entity.

The 19th B.N.I. is important because it was the regiment charged with testing the new cartridges on 26 February 1857. However, right up to the mutiny the new rifles had not been issued to them, and the cartridges in the magazine of the regiment were as free of grease as they had been through the preceding half-century. The paper used in wrapping the cartridges was of a different colour, arousing suspicions. The non-commissioned officers of the regiment refused to accept the cartridges on 26 February. This information was conveyed to the commanding officer, Colonel William Mitchell; he took it upon himself to try to convince the sepoys that the cartridges were no different from those they had been accustomed to and that they need not bite it. He concluded his exhortation with an appeal to the native officers to uphold the honour of the regiment and a threat to court-martial such sepoys as refused to accept the cartridge. However, the next morning the sepoys of the regiment seized their bell of arms (weapons store). The subsequent conciliatory behaviour of Mitchell convinced the sepoys to return to their barracks.

=== Court of Enquiry ===
A Court of Enquiry was ordered which, after an investigation which lasted nearly a month, recommended the disbanding of the 19th B.N.I. The same was carried out on 31 March. The discharged sepoys of the 19th B.N.I. were allowed to retain items of their uniform and were provided by the government with allowances to return to their homes. Both Colonel Mitchell of the 19th B.N.I. and (subsequent to the incident of 29 March) Colonel Wheeler of Pandey's 34th B.N.I. were declared unsuited to take charge of any new regiments raised to replace the disbanded units.

=== Consequences ===
The attack by and punishment of Pandey is widely seen as the opening scene of what came to be known as the Indian Rebellion of 1857. Knowledge of his action was widespread amongst his fellow sepoys and is assumed to have been one of the factors leading to the general series of mutinies that broke out during the following months. Mangal Pandey would prove to be influential for later figures in the Indian Nationalist Movement like V.D. Savarkar, who viewed his motive as one of the earliest manifestations of Indian Nationalism. Modern Indian nationalists portray Pandey as the mastermind behind a conspiracy to revolt against the British, although a recently published analysis of events immediately preceding the outbreak concludes that "there is little historical evidence to back up any of these revisionist interpretations".

During the rebellion that followed, Pandee or Pandey became the derogatory term used by British soldiers and civilians when referring to a mutinous sepoy. This was a direct derivation from the name of Mangal Pandey.

== Recognition ==
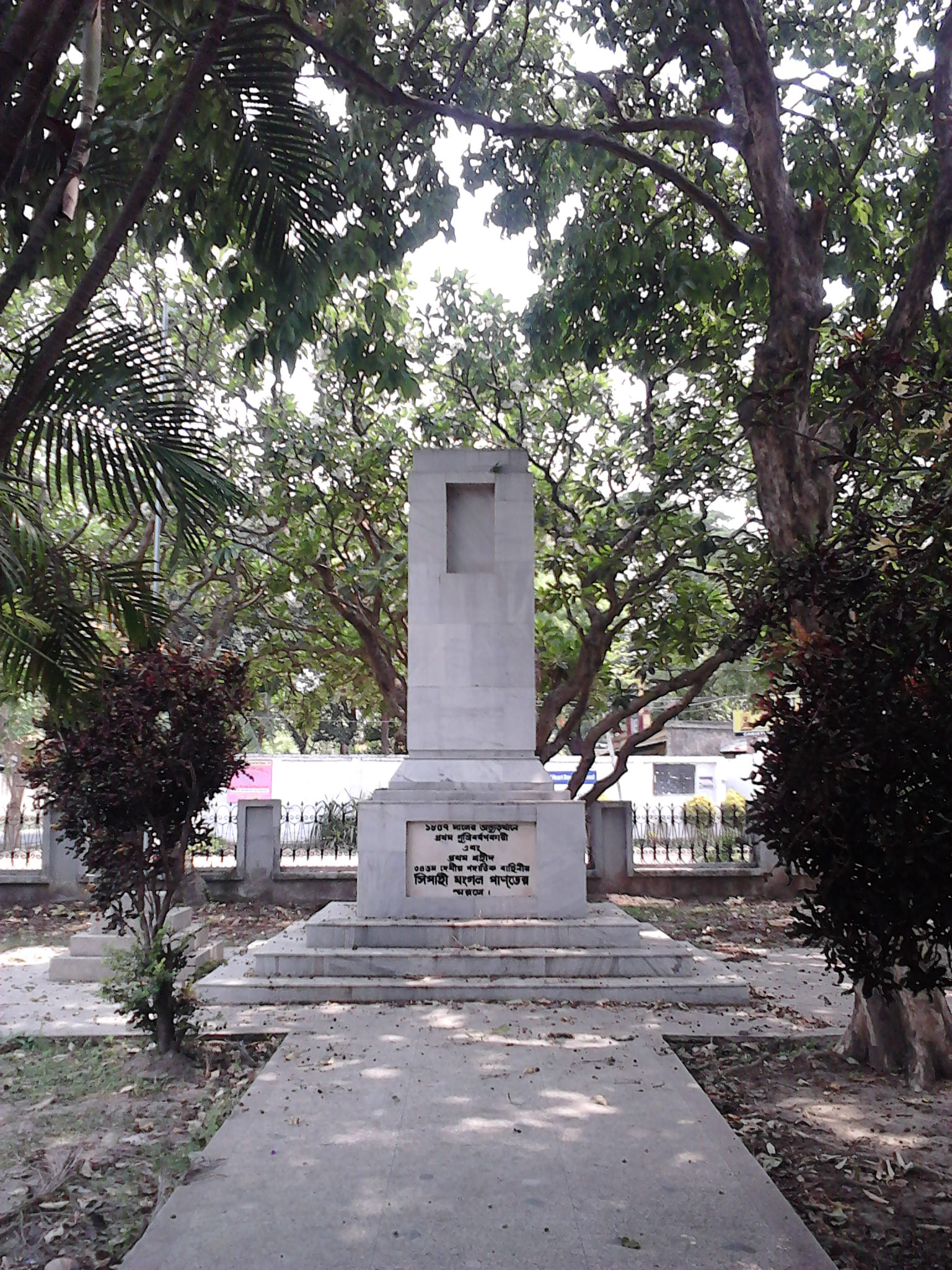
The Mangal Pandey cenotaph on Surendranath Banerjee road at Barrackpore Cantonment, West Bengal

The Government of India commemorated Pandey by issuing a postage stamp bearing his image on 5 October 1984. The stamp and the accompanying first-day cover were designed by Delhi-based artist C. R. Pakrashi.

A park named Shaheed Mangal Pandey Maha Udyan has been set up at Barrackpore to commemorate the place where Pandey attacked British officers and was subsequently hanged.

== In popular culture ==
A film based on the sequence of events that led up to the mutiny entitled Mangal Pandey: The Rising starring Indian actor, Aamir Khan along with Rani Mukerji, Amisha Patel and Toby Stephens, directed by Ketan Mehta was released on 12 August 2005.

The life of Pandey was the subject of a stage play titled The Roti Rebellion, which was written and directed by Supriya Karunakaran. The play was organized by Sparsh, a theatre group, and presented in June 2005 at The Moving Theatre at Andhra Saraswat Parishad, Hyderabad, Andhra Pradesh.

Samad Iqbal, a fictional descendant of Mangal Pandey, is a central character in Zadie Smith's debut novel White Teeth. Pandey is an important influence on Samad's life and is repeatedly referenced and investigated by the novel's characters.

== See also ==
- Barrackpore Mutiny of 1824
- Pandey
- Bahadur Shah II

== Cited sources ==
- David, Saul (2002). The Indian Mutiny. Penguin Adult. ISBN 0-141-00554-8.
- Forrest, George (1893). Selections from the letters, despatches and other state papers preserved in the Military Department of the Government of India, 1857–58.
- Sen, Surendra Nath (1957). Eighteen Fifty-Seven. Publications Division, Ministry of Information & Broadcasting, Govt. of India.
- Wagner, Kim A. (2014). The Great Fear of 1857. Rumours, Conspiracies and the Making of the Indian Uprising. ISBN 978-93-81406-34-2.
