= Alkaluk =

Tight fitting tunic

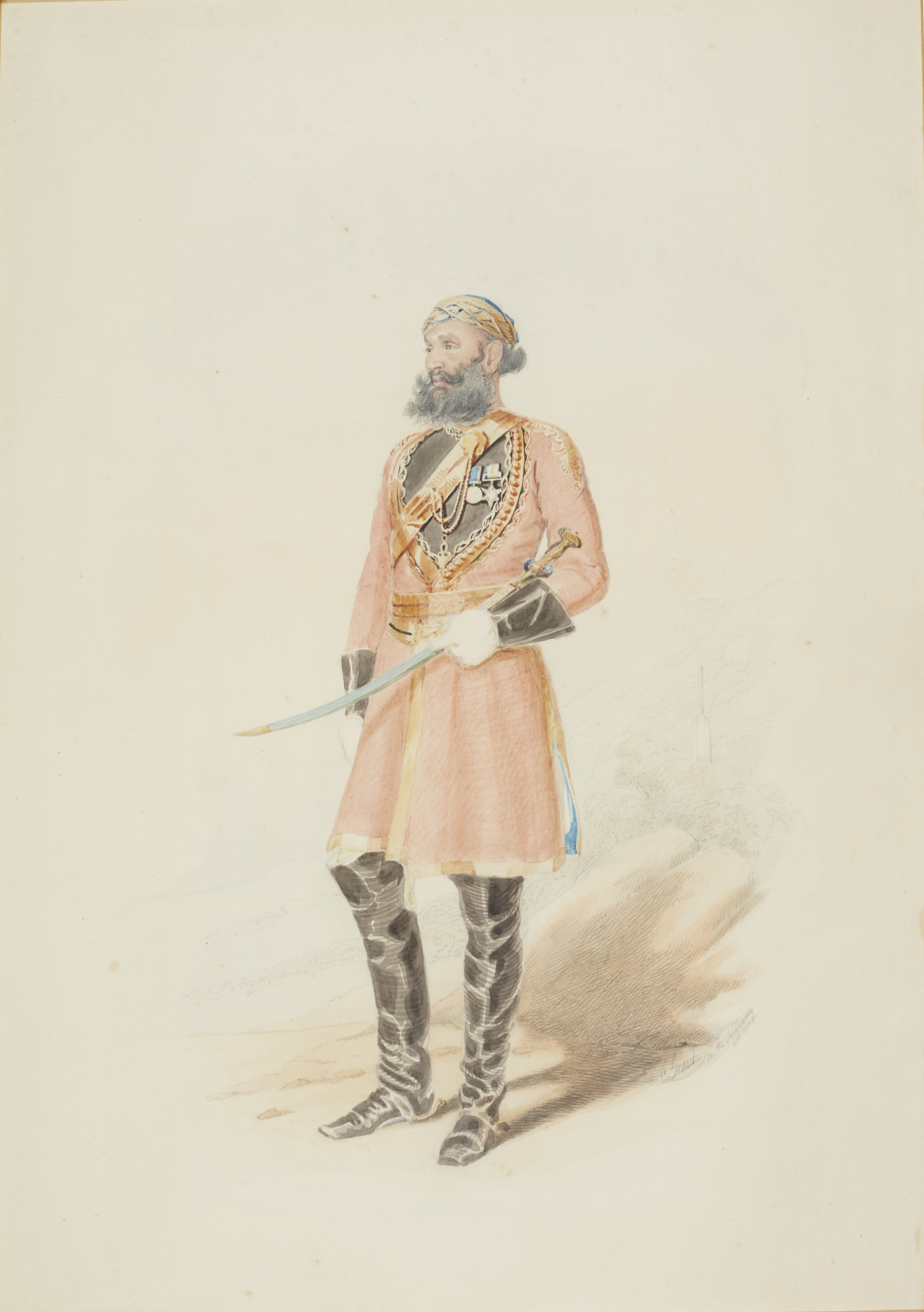
A jemadar of the 8th Bengal Irregular Cavalry, 1855

Akaluk was a tight-fitting tunic of long length has a front open with long sleeves made with quilted stuff. Once, it was an outfit of the cavalry for the first eight regiments during India's colonial era. The elite people also wore the garment in the 19th century. However, the British eventually replaced it with a waistcoat.

== See also ==
- Cavalry
- Irregular military
