= Bajekan =

Coordinates: 29.506°N 75.103°E

Bajekan is a village in Sirsa district in the Indian state of Haryana named after Baaz-E-Khan Cheema.

The village is referred to as Jandian in earlier sources. Revenue records indicate that the village acquired its present name in the early twentieth century. The village was purchased by Nahar Singh Rathore, who served as Kotwal of Sirsa in 1838. Nahar Singh was a Risaldar in Skinner’s Horse and an exiled jagirdar from Marwar.

Following the Partition of India, several communities migrated to the village.

The village has been politically prominent in the region. Thakur Bahadur Singh Rathore served as a Member of the Haryana Legislative Assembly. Gandharva Rathore qualified for the Indian Administrative Service (IAS) and is currently serving in the neighbouring state of Himachal Pradesh.

Manjinder Singh Sirsa is from Bajekan village. Subedar Pawan Kumar Jangra retired from Corps of SIGNALS, Army is from Bajekan village.

Situated 8 kilometres (5.0 mi) south east of Sirsa on National Highway 9, it had approximately 4500 voters in 2010. There is a Government Senior Secondary located in Bajekan, a girls primary school and a number of other private schools. Agriculture, Business, is the occupation of majority. Marwari, Bagri, Saraiki and Punjabi are spoken throughout the village.

https://commons.wikimedia.org/wiki/File:Thakur_Bahadur_Singh_-_Formar_MLA_-_Haryana.jpg

https://commons.wikimedia.org/wiki/File:Bajekan_dhingsara_com.png
