= Shaikh Paltu =

Indian soldier and rebel

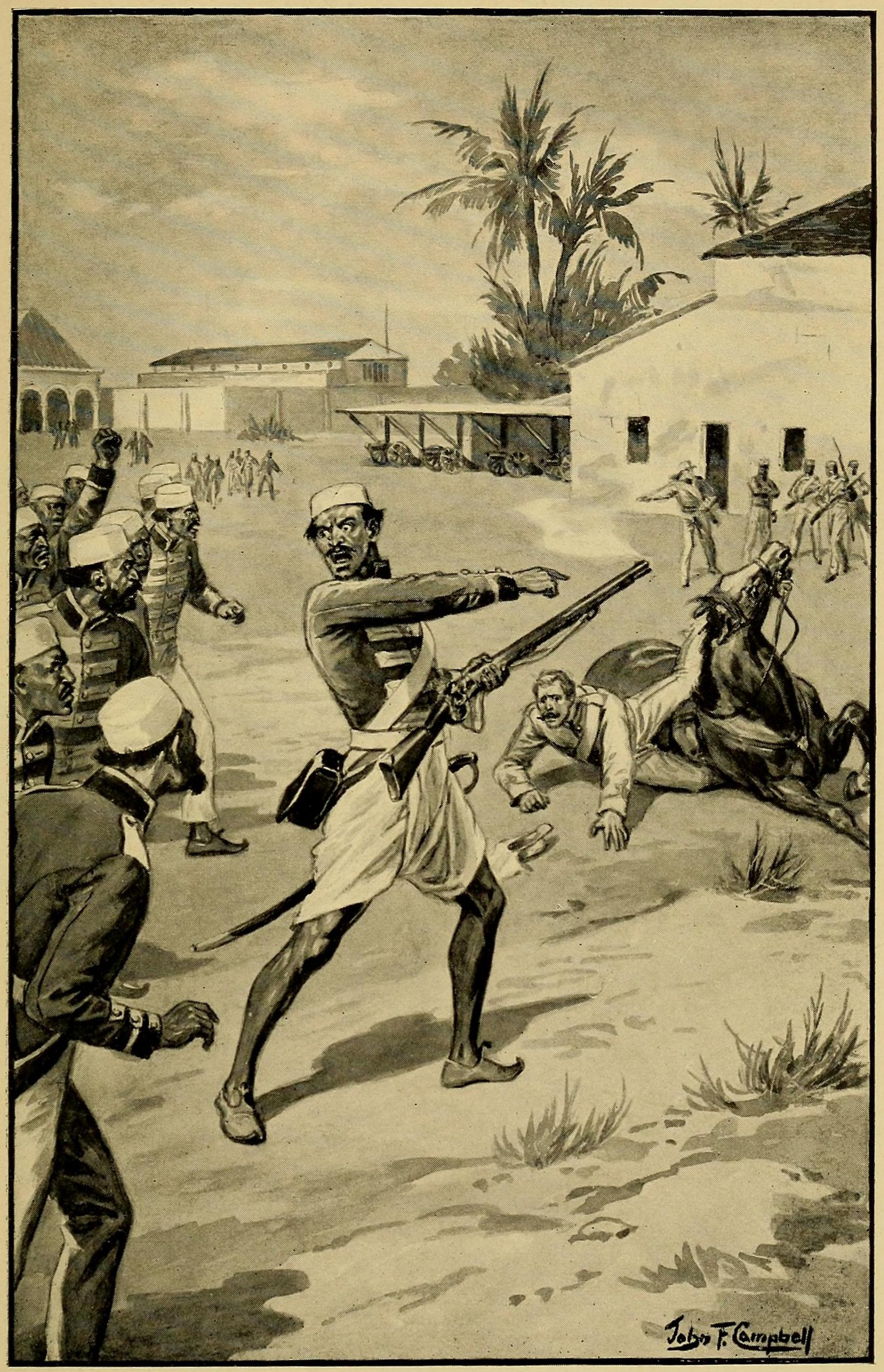
- Representation of Mangal Pandey attacking a British lieutenant. Shaikh Paltu seized Mangal Pandey immediately after this.
- Born: c. 1820s
- Died: 6 May 1857; Barrackpore , 34th Bengal Native Infantry, Bengal Presidency, Company Raj
- Cause of death: Murder
- Military Career
- Allegiance: East India Company
- Branch: Bengal Army
- Rank: Havildar; Sepoy (formerly)
- Unit: 34th Bengal Native Infantry
- Awards: Indian Order of Merit

Shaikh Paltu, IOM (c. 1820s – 6 May 1857) was a sepoy (soldier), with the British East India Company who served in the 34th Bengal Native Infantry in March 1857, shortly before widespread discontent broke out in the Bengal Army. When on March 29, Sepoy Mangal Pandey of the same regiment attacked a British lieutenant, Shaikh Paltu intervened to assist the officer. The sepoys of the quarter guard on duty and others present refused to take any action against their comrade and remained as "idle spectators of a murderous assault".

Following this incident Shaikh Paltu was promoted to havildar (sergeant) and recommended for a decoration. He was however subsequently murdered, reportedly by fellow sepoys.

== History ==
An English sergeant-major had been first to arrive at the scene but was knocked down by the musket of a member of the quarter-guard. While other sepoys looked on, the lightly armed Shaikh Paltu held Mangal Pandey by the waist tightly and restrained him from attacking the British. and calling upon other soldiers to join him. A number of off-duty sepoys had crowded around the struggle and some abused and struck at Shaikh Paltu with stones and shoes.

The intervention of Shaikh Paltu enabled Adjutant Baugh and Sergeant-Major Hewson, both injured, to rise. Some members of the quarter-guard detachment are reported to have struck their officers with the butts of their muskets, while four others were ordered by the guard commander Jemadar Ishwari Prasad not to intervene in support of Shaikh Paltu.

Major-General J. Hearse, who with other officers had ridden to the scene, now took control of the situation. Pandey shot and wounded himself, and the members of the quarter-guard now obeyed orders. Mangal Pandey "shivering and convulsed" with a chest wound was brought to the regimental hospital under guard.

== Aftermath ==
Mangal Pandey and the Jemadar in command of the guard were subsequently court-martialed, and executed by hanging on 8 and 21 April respectively.

The seven companies of the 34th Bengal Native Infantry (BNI) stationed at Barrackpore on 29 March were disbanded five weeks later on May 6. Three companies of the regiment located elsewhere on that day, plus the loyalist Shaikh Paltu, continued in service.

In recognition of his action Shaikh Paltu was promoted to havildar (sergeant) and recommended by General Hearse to be presented with the Order of Merit. Shortly after receiving his decoration and just before the discharging of most of the 34th BNI, Shaikh Paltu was murdered by several of his former comrades in an isolated part of the cantonment.

The Great Indian Rebellion of 1857 broke out at Meerut on the evening of Sunday 10 May 1857, following closely on the incident involving Mangal Pandey and Shaikh Paltu exactly six weeks earlier.

== In popular culture ==
=== Films and television ===
In the 2005 Bollywood Hindi movie Mangal Pandey: The Rising, directed by Ketan Mehta, Shaikh Paltu was portrayed by Murali Sharma.

== Suggested readings ==
- Malleson, G.B., The Indian Mutiny of 1857, pp. 36–39, Delhi, Rupa & Co. publishers, 2005 (first published: 1890)
