= Shiledar =

Type of soldier in India's Maratha Empire

Shiledar was a rank and title used in the Maratha Confederacy (1630–1818), particularly during the reign of Chhatrapati Shivaji Maharaj. The term Shiledar (Marathi: शिलेदार) literally means “a soldier who possesses his own sword and horse,” referring to a cavalryman who was self-equipped and directly participated in warfare.

During Shivaji Maharaj’s rule, the Maratha army included a significant number of Shiledars, many of whom belonged to the 96-clan, 5-clan, and 7-clan divisions of the Maratha clan system. These warriors played an important role in the military campaigns fought by the Marathas against their adversaries.

According to their service, contribution, and valour, Shiledars were often promoted to higher ranks such as Subhedar, Panch Hajari, Havaldar, and Vatandar.

After the decline of the Maratha Confederacy, Shiledar gradually evolved into a surname adopted by descendants of these warrior families. The Shiledar Royal Family traces its lineage to the Shinde, Phalke, and Bhoite clans of the Maratha community.

Members of this family later settled in Derde Korhale, located in Kopargaon taluka of Ahmednagar district, Maharashtra, where their ancestral residence—a seven-storeyed palace—once stood. Over time, descendants migrated to other regions including Nashik, Pune, and Konkan, while Derde Korhale remains recognized as their ancestral seat.

== See also ==
- Silladar Cavalry
