= Subedar =

Rank of junior commissioned officer in South Asia

- Indian, Nepali and Pakistani insignia
- Country: India; Nepal; Pakistan
- Rank group: Junior commissioned officer
- Next higher rank: Subedar-major (Indian Army and Pakistan Army); Pramukh Suvēdār (Nepal Army)
- Next lower rank: Naib Subedar (Indian Army and Pakistan Army); Jemadar (Nepal Army)
- Equivalent ranks: Risaldar

Subedar is a military rank in the militaries of South Asia roughly equivalent to that of a warrant officer. Historically classed in the British Indian Army as a Viceroy's commissioned officer, the rank was retained in the Indian Army and Pakistan Army after independence. The rank of subedar is classed as a junior commissioned officer rank in India and Pakistan.

== History ==
Rank insignia of a British Indian Army Subedar, 1920–1950

Subedar or subadar was the second-highest rank of Indian officers in the military forces of British India, ranking below "British Commissioned Officers" and above "Local Non-Commissioned Officers". Indian officers were promoted to this rank on the basis of both lengths of service and individual merit.

Under British rule, a Risaldar was the cavalry equivalent of a Subedar. Subedar and Risaldar were both ranked senior to a Jemadar and junior to a Subedar Major or a Risaldar Major in an infantry/cavalry regiment of the Indian Army. Both Subedars and Risaldars wore two stars as rank insignia.

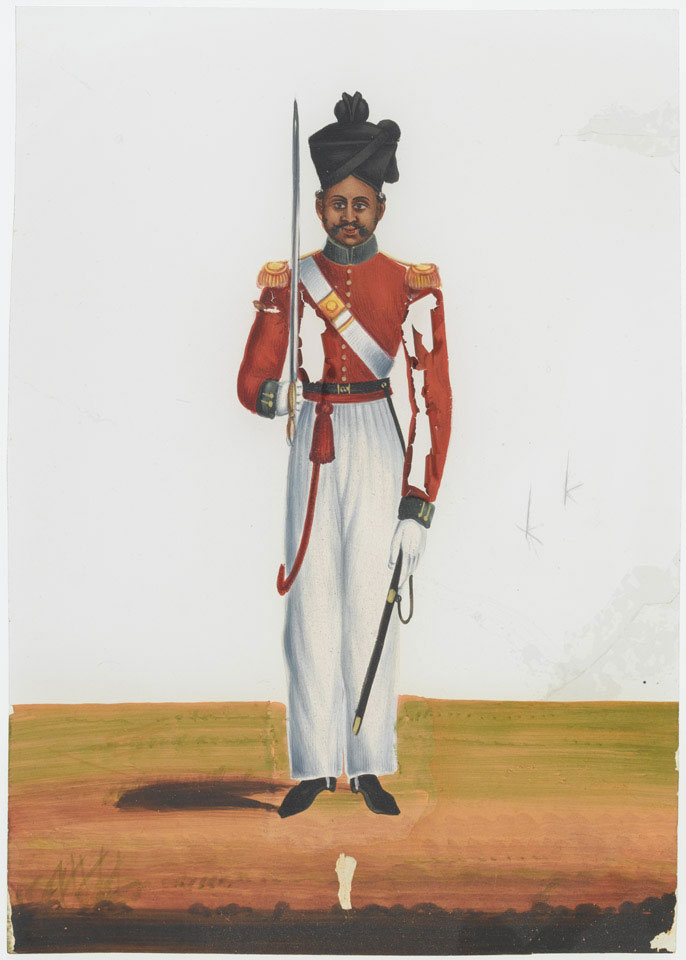
c. 1840 illustration of a Madras Army subedar

The rank was introduced in the East India Company's presidency armies (the Bengal Army, the Madras Army and the Bombay Army) to make it easier for British officers to communicate with Indian troops. It was thus important for subedars to have some competence in English. In a November 1755 order, the structure of an infantry company in the HEIC's newly raised infantry regiments provided for one subedar, four jemadars, 16 NCOs and 90 sepoys (private soldiers). This was to remain the approximate proportion until the number of British junior officers in a regiment increased later in the 18th century.

Until 1866, the rank was the highest an Indian soldier could achieve in the army of British India. A subedar's authority was confined to other Indian troops, and he could not command British troops. Promoted from the ranks and usually advanced through seniority based on long service; the typical subedar of this period was a relatively elderly veteran with limited English, whose extensive regimental experience and practical knowledge was not matched by formal education or training.

Before the Partition of India, subedars were known as Viceroy's commissioned officers (VCOs). After 1947, this term was changed to junior commissioned officers. It was not until the 1930s that significant numbers of Indian cadets began to be appointed as King's Commissioned Officers (KCOs) from either Sandhurst or the Indian Military Academy at Dehra Dun.

Until 1858, subedars wore two epaulettes with small bullion fringes on each shoulder. After 1858, they wore two crossed golden swords, or, in the Gurkha regiments, two crossed golden kukris, on each side of the collar of the tunic or on the right breast of the kurta. After 1900, subedars wore two pips on each shoulder. A red-yellow-red ribbon was introduced under each pip after World War I. After World War II, this ribbon was moved to lie between the shoulder title and the rank insignia (two brass stars on both shoulders).

During the period of British rule, subedars and other VCOs wore distinctive uniforms that combined features of both British and Indian military dress.

== After independence ==
After independence in 1947, with the Partition of India, the former Indian Army was divided between India and Pakistan.

=== Indian Army ===
In the Indian Army, the rank has been promoted to second senior-most JCO with a ribbon band on the shoulder strap of two gold stars with a gold-red-gold stripe below. The Junior Commissioned Officers of the Indian Army are equivalent to Group-B Gazetted Officers in India.

=== Pakistan Army ===
In the Pakistan Army, the rank has been retained as a senior JCO, but the distinguishing ribbon band on the shoulder strap is now red-green-red.

Next Senior Rank

After Getting promoted to Subedar,The next and highest rank is Subedar Major (SM).

Honourary Ranks after Subedar :-

1- Honourary Lieutenant

2- Honourary Captain
