= Atul Bakshi =

Indian glass artist

- Born: Atul Bakshi; 2 September 1956 (age 69); Amritsar, Punjab, India
- Spouse: Rekha Bakshi (1984–current)
- Website: atulbakshi.com

Atul Bakshi (born 2 September 1956) is an Indian glass artist who specialises stained glass, blown glass, and cast glass. His scope of work ranges from restoring stained glass windows and panels to executing commissioned works for private homes and businesses.

== Life and career ==
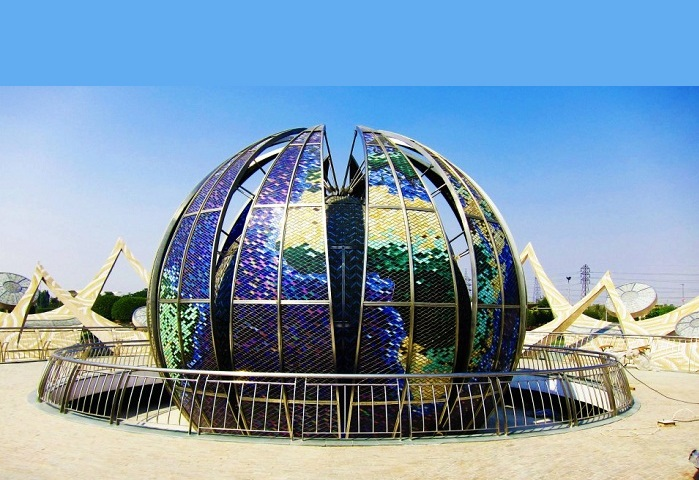
Fountain of Oneness – Public art in New Delhi

Bakshi was born in Amritsar in Punjab, India. He is the great-grandson of Ganda Singh Datt and son of Bakshi Hardev Singh. Bakshi completed his high school education at St. Francis School in Amritsar. He then enrolled in the Merchant Navy at the T.S. Rajendra in Mumbai from 1974 until 1976. His travels in the Navy exposed him to different arts and cultures, and this eventually led him to quit his job of 23 years to pursue his interest in the glassmaking.

In 1984, Bakshi studied the technique of modern stained glass in Australia. He returned home to set up his own studio for coldworking, Studio Lead Light, in Vasant Kunj, Delhi. He also works with a team at Firozabad, Uttar Pradesh for glassblowing and casting. His work is influenced by Bertil Vallien.

== Exhibitions ==
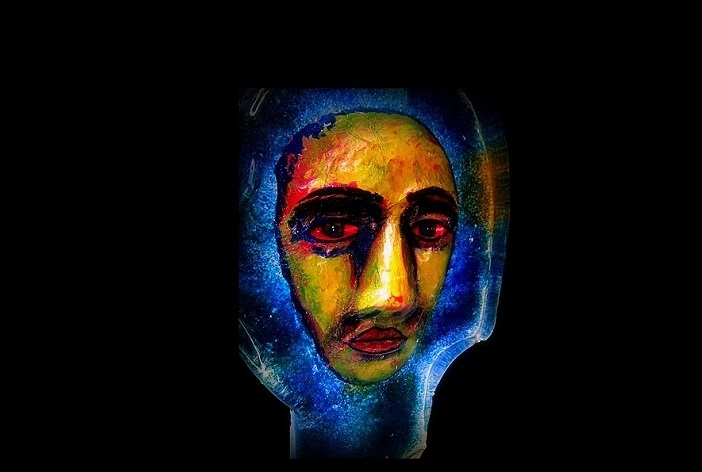
Glass face of Artist's creation Mother Nature

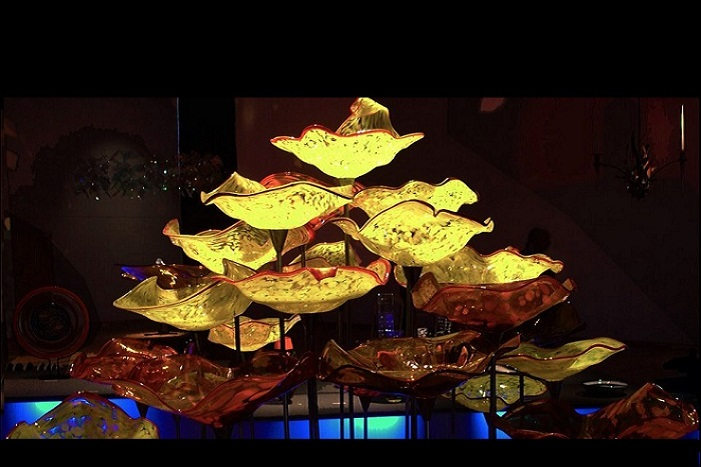
Blown Glass roundels installation

- Group exhibition, Art Spice Gallery, The Metropolitan Hotel, New Delhi, 2012
- Group exhibition, AUDI Gurgaon, Gurgaon, 2012
- Group installation, residence of the Swedish ambassador in India, 2010
- "Atul Bakshi – Glass," solo exhibition, Cymroza Art Gallery, Mumbai, 2010
- "In Mystic Moments," solo exhibition, Epicentre, Apparel House, Gurgaon, 2008
- Group exhibition, India Habitat Centre, New Delhi, 2006
- Group exhibition, Linkoping, Sweden, 2006
- Exhibition, Vis-a Vis Art and Design Centre, New Delhi, 1999
