= Silladar Cavalry =

Indian irregular military units

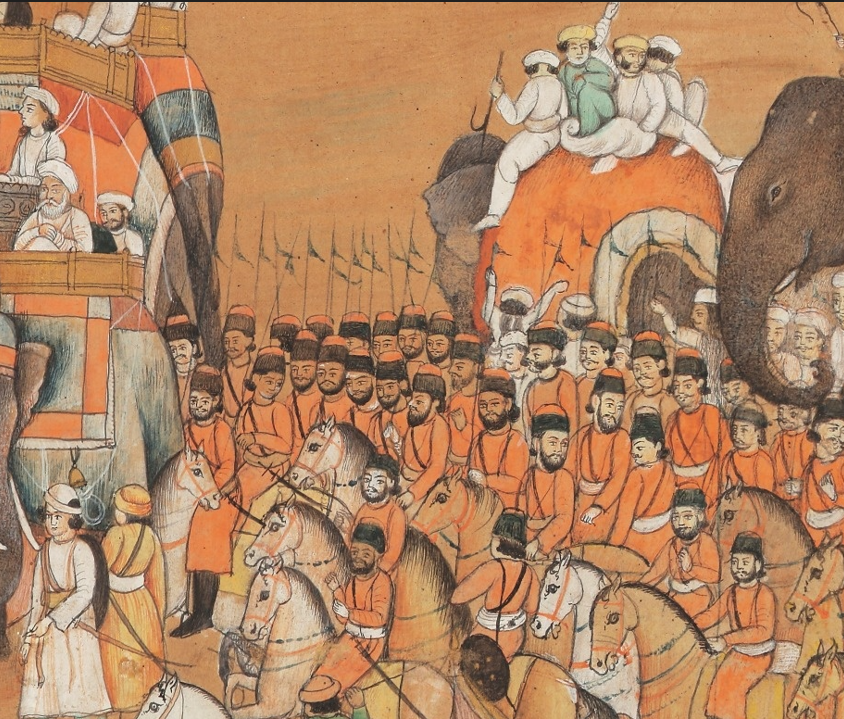
Cavalry in Delhi during British rule

The Silladar Cavalry, also known as the Risalah, was a term describing a mounted force of irregular cavalry regiments at times in Indian history. Silladar means “bearer of arms” in Persian and was given to native cavalrymen (sowars) of irregular regiments. A recruit or "Khudaspa" was supposed to provide his own mount and weapons as well as stabling attendant, forage, tent and clothing. It was opposed to having them provided for them by any local or central group or command. They were recruited from local dominant landowning clans, who were cultivators and who traditionally owned weapons and provided military service to local feudal chiefs. The irregular cavalry regiments were almost entirely composed of Muslims, because "the Hindoos are not, generally speaking, as disposed as the Mahomedans to the duties of a trooper."

== East India Company and British Raj ==
The end of Muslim rule saw a large number of unemployed Muslim horsemen, who were employed in the army of the EIC. British officers such as Skinner, Gardner and Hearsay had become leaders of irregular cavalry that preserved the traditions of Mughal cavalry, which had a political purpose because it absorbed pockets of cavalrymen who might otherwise become disaffected plunderers. This irregular cavalry was raised under the silladar system, which was adopted from the Mughal silladar system, by recruiting khudaspas into the cavalry regiments. They were primarily recruited among Hindustani Musalman biradaris, such as the Ranghar(Rajput Muslims), Lalkhani, Sheikhs, Sayyids, Mughals, and Hindustani Pathans, who made up three-fourths of the cavalry branch of the British army.

The term 'Horse' indicated in most instances a non regular corps. From 1823 to 1840 irregular cavalry were officially designated 'Local Horse' and included the founder's name in brackets as in 1st (Skinner's) Rgt. of Local Horse. Each man was nominally a sillidar and provided his own horse and arms. From 1851, the privately owned matchlocks were replaced by government carbines and ammunition to ensure greater uniformity.

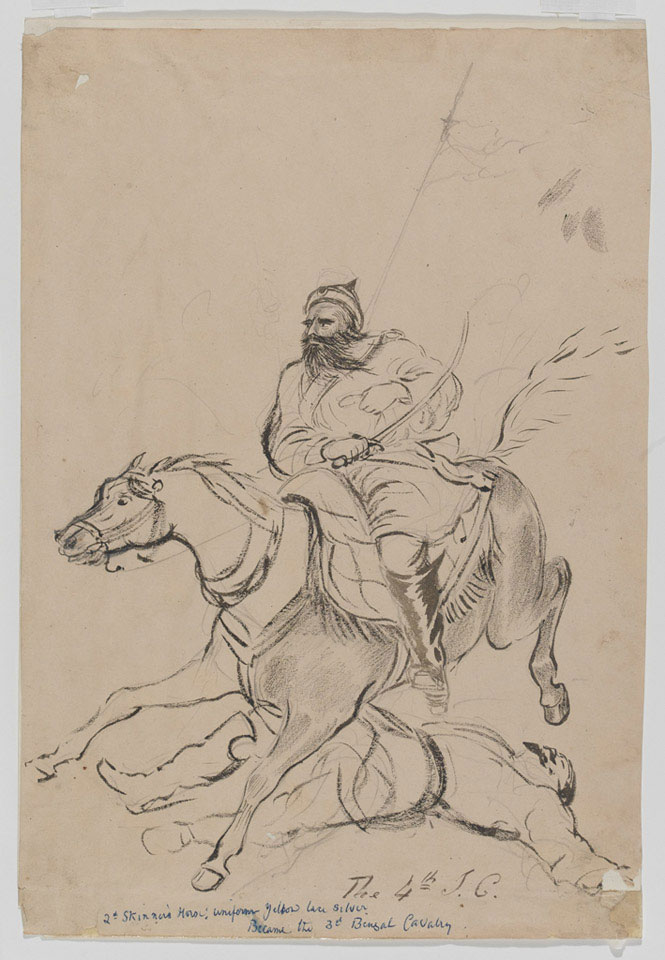
The 4th Irregular Cavalry

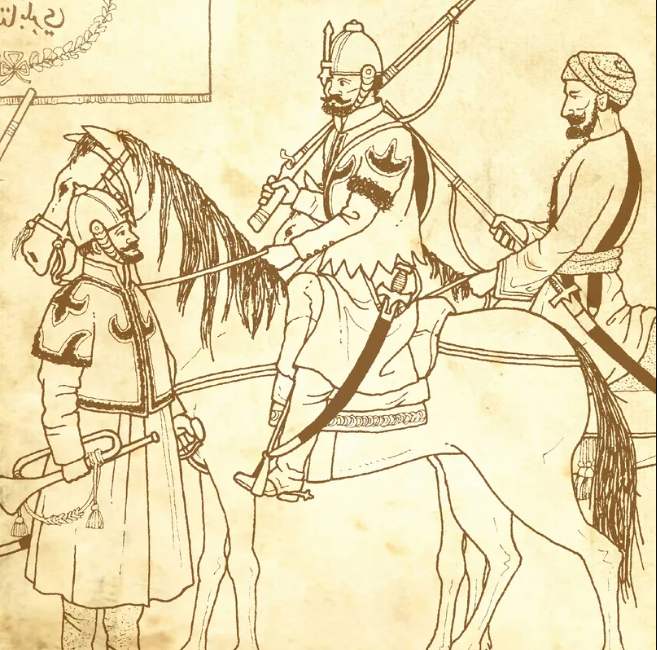
Skinner's Horse

The commandants received money advances to equip their regiments, and the silladars repaid these advances from their monthly pay. However, a silladar's position (an asami) was transferrable and was often held by a non-serving investor (a benoker silladar). The benoker sillidar bought mount, arms and further equipment to lease them to a paid substitute (a bargir) who was to serve as sowar then. In return, the 'bargir-sowar' paid the benoker sillidar a significant share of his pay continuously. Some silladars even held a group (a pagai) of asamis. In 1858, an irregular sowar drew some 20 Rs. a month whilst a regular trooper was paid between 9 and 11 Rs. depending on length of service. Up to World War I a sowar's pay rose to 34 Rs. plus 5-8 Rs. dearness allowance of which he had to pay his initial expenses of about 450 Rs. for mount, arms, equipment and uniform.

The silladar system was extended to the regular cavalry of the Bengal and Bombay Armies in 1861.

Native officers resp. Viceroy's commissioned officers (VCO, from 1885) in irregular corps, like the silladar cavalry, enjoyed a greater leeway and consequently a higher status due to the lack of british officers established there. Usually, only the Commandant, the Second-in-command (2i/c), the Adjutant and the Surgeon were british, so a troop (equivalent to an infantry company) was commanded by a native resp. Indian Officer, who could even rise to squadron commander. From 1885, a silladar regiment consisted of four (previously three) squadrons, with a British commander and a British 2i/c each. Each squadron had two troops of nine NCOs, 70 sowars and one trumpeter, led by a Rissaldar and a Jemadar as 2i/c.

== Deficiencies of the silladar system ==
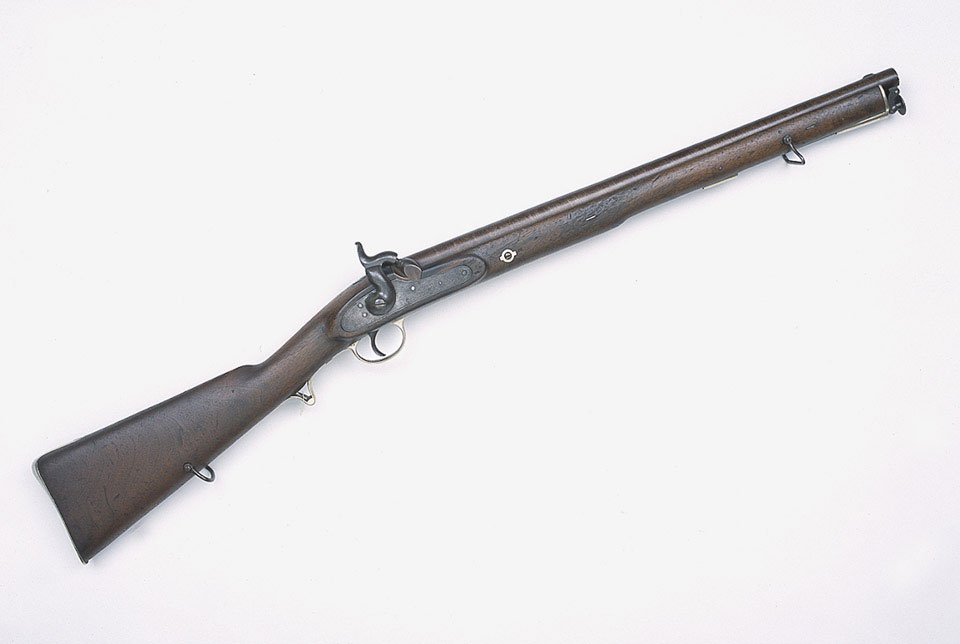
Percussion carbine, 12th (Bengal) Irregular Cavalry, 1845 (c)

This traditional system caused some trouble, due to its financial impact. Some men drew e.g. 400 Rs. and then bought horse and equipment for 100 Rs. less. A longstanding problem with the silladar system was that a few native officers resp. VCOs and men regularly failed to pay their required financial securities for large amounts advanced to them. This would affect the regiment's founder resp. commandant, when he was to reimburse the money which had been advanced by the authorities. For example, the raising of Beatson's Horse (Bengal Army) in 1857 produced an expenditure of 475.508 Rs. Big debts could even lead to disbandment, as happened to the 10th Bengal Irregular Cavalry in 1857. The opportunity to disavow debts by changing allegiance was a constant temptation in traditional Indian armies.

== Units of note ==
- 1839 Scinde Irregular Horse
- 1857 Hodson's Horse
- 1861 9th Regiment of Scinde Silladar Cavalry
- 1861 3rd Regiment of Bombay Silladar Light Cavalry

== See also ==
- Shiledar
