= Nagwa =

- Location in Uttar Pradesh, India Nagwa (India)
- Coordinates: 25°45′00″N 84°12′40″E
- Country: India
- State: Uttar Pradesh
- District: Ballia

Languages
  - Official: Hindi, Urdu
  - Regional: Bhojpuri
- Time zone: UTC+5:30 (IST)
- PIN: 277001
- Telephone code: 05498
- Vehicle registration: UP-60
- Nearest city: Ballia
- Climate: Moderate (Köppen)

Nagwa is a village with a population of 8,000 and 1,300-acre (5.3 km^{2}) in the Ballia district in the eastern part of Uttar Pradesh in India. A large percentage of the population consists of Hindus. The village is 6 km east of Ballia District Headquarters close to the River Ganges. It is the birthplace of Indian hero Mangal Pandey. Many statues and sculptures of martyrs were placed in Ballia after the Independence of India.

Mangal Pandey, widely regarded in India as the First Martyr in India's First War of Independence in 1857, was born and brought up in this village. In the movie "Mangal Pandey" the name of Ballia is not mentioned due dispute amongst the locals. People from Ballia believe that he lived in the thatched kutiyas. After a certain period he moved to the main Ballia market from Nagwa for trade.

== An overview over rival claims ==
News in Mid Day of August 15, 2004:

"One hundred and forty-seven years after this sepoy of the 35th battalion in Barrakpur (Kolkata) was executed by the colonial rulers, he seems to have lost his identity, with two districts, four villages and several families in Uttar Pradesh fighting among themselves to claim him, and the state administration's not sure enough to be the last word on the issue." In the heart of the village there is a primary school. After many efforts of villagers, government recognised a university named after Mangal Pandey which is under construction.
