= Risaldar =

Indian and Pakistani military rank

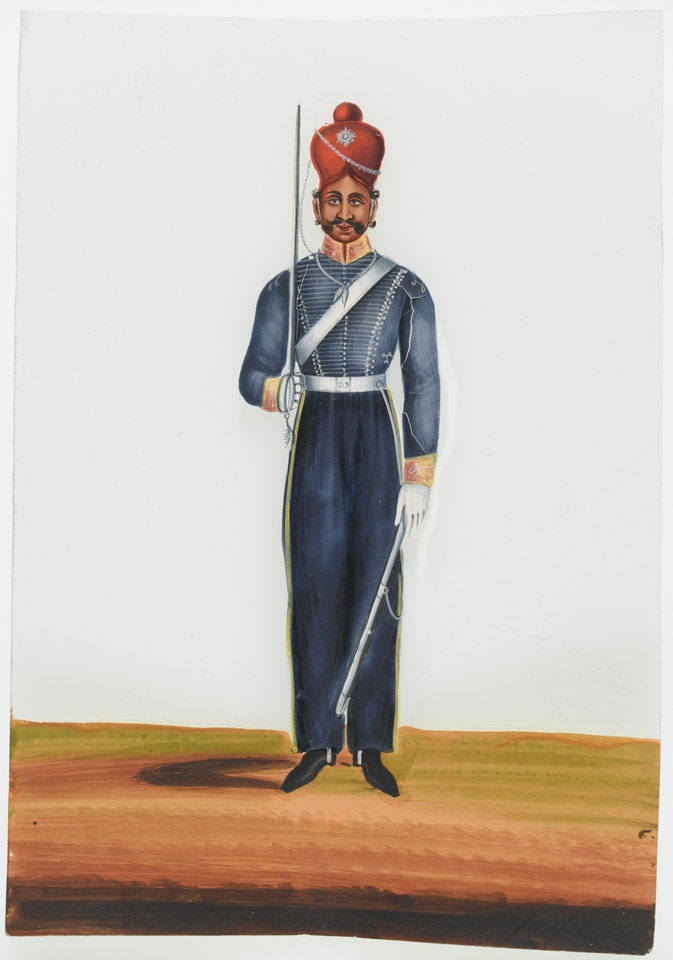
c. 1840 illustration of a Madras Army risaldar

Risaldar, meaning the commander of a risala or risalah (a body of horse, regardless if troop or regiment) in Persian, is a mid-level rank in cavalry and armoured units of the Indian and Pakistan Army. In other arms, such as the infantry, the equivalent rank is subedar. Risaldar was also a viceroy's commissioned officer's rank in the British Indian Army, until 1947.

== Indian and Pakistan Armies ==
The Indian Army and Pakistan Army have a unique set of ranks, called junior commissioned officers (JCO). They stand between non-commissioned officers and commissioned officers. A risaldar ranks above a naib risaldar and below a risaldar major.

== British Indian Army ==
The JCO evolved from the Viceroy's commissioned officers (VCO), established during the British Raj in 1885. The VCOs themselves succeeded the so called native officers holding a commission of the Governor General.

In the late 19th century, the spelling risaldar was uncommon, and the rank was usually listed as ressaldar or russuldar (e.g. in the Bombay Cavalry). During World War I, the spelling rissaldar became common.

A rissaldar was roughly equivalent to a native captain and ranked between risaldar-major and ressaidar (later jemadar). But like all VCOs, they were always outranked by the most junior officer with a King's or Queen's commission.

== See also ==
- Ressaidar
