= Viceroy's commissioned officer =

Senior Indian member of the British Indian Army

A viceroy's commissioned officer (VCO) was a senior Indian member of the British Indian Army. VCOs were senior in rank to warrant officers in the British Army, and held a commission issued by the viceroy. Also known as "Indian officers" or "native officers", they had authority only over Indian troops and were subordinate to all British King's (resp. Queen's) commissioned officers (KCO resp. QCO), Indian Commissioned Officers (ICO) and King's commissioned Indian officers (KCIO).

Similar ranks, as listed below, are retained in the Indian Army and Pakistan Army. There, they are known as junior commissioned officers.

== History ==
Under the British, there was a clear colonial context, with the VCOs being the highest ranks that an Indian could attain. The full commissioned officers were British, from the 18th century up to the beginning of the 20th century. However, that changed slowly under the principles of Indianisation. In 1905, a special form of King’s Commission in His Majesty's Native Land Forces was instituted. Indians who had qualified through the Imperial Cadet Corps would earn a commission that was limited to authority over Indian troops only and its holders could not rise above the rank of Major. From 1917, in the midst of World War I, Indians 'with good family background' became eligible to study at the Royal Military College, Sandhurst and then earn a commission as King's Commissioned Indian Officer (KCIO). By the time of independence in 1947, there were many Indian (and Pakistani) officers who had graduated from Sandhurst or the Indian Military Academy. In 1945 the Willcox Committee Report recommended that VCOs be phased out, though this never occurred.

== Ranks and appointments ==
British Indian Army viceroy's commissioned officer (VCO) rank insignia
| Rank group | Native officers |
|---|---|---|---|
| (United Kingdom) British Indian Army |
| Rank | Subedar major (Note: Known as Risaldar Major in cavalry regiments.) | Subedar (Note: Known as Risaldar in cavalry regiments.) | Jemadar |
| Abbreviation | SubMaj | Sub | Jem |

In 1914, ranks held by VCOs were:

- Cavalry
  - Rissaldar-Major (native 'Major', adviser to the British officers and commander)
  - Rissaldar (native 'Captain', troop commander)
  - Ressaidar (native 'Lieutenant', junior troop commander)
  - Jemadar (native 'Second Lieutenant', platoon commander)
- Infantry, Indian Garrison Artillery, Indian Mountain Artillery and other arms
  - Subadar-Major (native 'Major', adviser to the British officers and commander)
  - Subedar (native 'Lieutenant', company commander)
  - Jemadar (native 'Second Lieutenant', platoon commander)

As a company commander a Subadar was roughly equivalent to a native Infantry 'Captain'. Nonetheless, in World War I, he was classified as native 'Lieutenant' but remained in the position of company commander. In result, there was no equivalent rank for a native 'Captain' in the Indian native Infantry etc. at that time.

Until May 1819, in the Madras Army Native Foot Artillery the Subedars of the lascars (servants or hands, analogous to the matrosses in British artillery) were called Syrang and the Jemadars were designated 1st Tindal (while Havildar ranked as 2nd Tindals), in order to distinguish them from the native officers of native artillerymen (golundauze). In the Bengal (Native) Artillery of the late 18th century, in each company some 500 lascars were employed for the more menial duties (pointing and loading was spared to European artillerymen). The lascars were supervised by 10 Serangs and 40 Tindals. It is unclear whether the same procedure was followed with the Sirdars 1st and 2nd class of Gun Drivers, Miners and Syces (native stable-helpers and grooms in artillery and cavalry).

There was only one Rissaldar-Major or Subadar-Major per regiment. The latter was established between 1817 and 1819 in the Bengal Army resp. the Madras Army. In 1825, the equivalent rank of Risaldar-Major was adopted by all Presidency armies. Both ranks would serve as a representative of their people to British officers, but could also command independent companies resp. troops of irregular regiments. While providing guidance to inexperienced British subalterns, they also discussed major issues concerning the Indian soldiers of all ranks with the Colonel (Infantry) or Commandant (Cavalry). Rissaldar-Majors or Subadar-Majors could be appointed Native A.-D.-C. to the Viceroy or the Governor of their British India Province.

Beginning from 1903, there were also six (four from 1904) King's Indian Orderly Officers (KIOO), chosen each year to serve as the King's honorary bodyguard in the United Kingdom. They were appointed regardless of their specific ranks.

In the Indian cavalry existed the appointment of Woordie-Major. He was the assistant to the British adjudant. Usually, a capable Ressaidar, Jemadar or Naib Risaldar (brevet Risaldar, in the Bombay cavalry only) was promoted to this position, then ranking above his substantive rank. The Naib Risaldar (also spelled Naib Ressaldar) ranked below Ressaidar and above Jemadar, but was roughly equivalent with the latter. The rank was abolished in 1865.

The VCO's status could be bolstered by honorary promotions, e.g. a Rissaldar-Major could held the honorary rank of Captain simultaneously, or a Jemadar was awarded by the honorary rank of Second Lieutenant. A custom often practised on retirement, but not exclusively. An honorary rank was not only a distinction but had the financial benefit of doubling the pension to be received by the retiring Indian officer.

== Status and responsibilities ==
The term 'Viceroy's Commissioned Officer' was formally adopted in 1885 as a substitute for the previously used 'Native Officer' (NO). In the same year, the term Native was dropped from regimental titles. These ranks were created to facilitate effective liaison between the British officers and their Indian troops. The soldiers who were promoted to VCO rank had long service and good service records, spoke reasonably fluent English, and could act as a common liaison point between officers and men and as advisers to the British officers on Indian affairs.

VCOs were treated and addressed with respect. Even a British officer would address a VCO as, for instance, 'subedar sahib' or 'sahib'. Nevertheless, they were only saluted by Indian rank and file, not by European other ranks and officers. Furthermore, VCOs did not mess with British officers but ran their own.

The three former presidency armies of Bengal, Bombay, and Madras were transformed into the newly established Army of India, in 1895. Each infantry regiment consisted now of one battalion of eight companies, with six British officers in the headquarters and two further British officers as wing officers resp. wing commanders. A 'wing' was a half-battalion of four companies. A company was led by one Subadar, assisted by one Jemadar. The company itself counted ten native NCOs, 75 sepoys and two drummers. In the 1890s, the two wings were replaced by four 'double companies', commanded by one British Major or Captain, while the Indian chain of command maintained unaffected. By 1914 the proportion of VCOs to KCOs in an Indian infantry battalion was 16 to 14.

In irregular regiments such as those of the Silladar Cavalry, VCOs enjoyed a greater leeway and consequently a higher status due to the smaller number of British officers present. Usually, only the Commandant, the Second-in-Command, the Adjutant and the Surgeon were British, so a troop (equivalent to an infantry company) was commanded by a native resp. Indian Officer, who could even rise to squadron commander. From 1885, a Silladar regiment consisted of four (previously three) squadrons, with a British commander and a British 2IC each. Each squadron had two 'half-squadrons' or troops of nine Indian NCOs, 70 sowars and one trumpeter, each led by a Rissaldar and a Jemadar as 2IC.

== Pay ==
For example, in the last third of the 19th century, in the Bengal Army as the largest presidency army, the ranks of Subadar, Ressaldar, Ressaidar and Jemadar were divided in three (sometimes two) paygrades each (native sappers and miners, cavalry, infantry, but not native artillery).

Around 1867/68, in native miners and sappers as well as in native infantry, the pay scale ranged from 30 Rs. for a Jemadar, 2nd Class to 100 Rs. for a Subadar, 1st class. A Jemadar, 1st class had to be content with 35 Rs. whereas a Subadar, 3rd class was paid 67 Rs. and a Subadar, 2nd class drew 80 Rs. In the artillery, NOs were not split in different paygrades but were attached to them, so a Subadar in the light artillery was paid like a Subadar, 1st class (100 Rs.), in Garrison and Mountain artillery the sum was related to the pay of a Subadar, 2nd class (80 Rs.). A Jemadar drew 35 Rs. in all sorts of artillery, like a Jemadar, 1st class. The appointment of Subadar-Major (infantry only) earned an additional allowance of 25 Rs.

Pay in native cavalry was much higher. In a regiment of six troops, a Jemadar, 3rd class drew 60 Rs. (i.e. 6 Pounds) per Mensem while a Jemadar, 1st class drew 80 Rs. The highest native officer's paygrade, Ressaldar, 1st class, drew 300 Rs. A Woordie-Major earned 150 Rs., exactly the same as a Ressaidar, 1st class.

In comparison, a Lieutenant in one of the seven European cavalry regiments of the Bengal Army in 1867/68, drew about 305 Rs. p.M., a Cornet's pay was about 250 Rs. A Cavalry Regimental Sergeant Major drew a bit less than 52 Rs. His colleague in the European infantry attached to the Bengal Army came near to 49 Rs., while a Colour Sergeant drew almost 32 Rs.

== Uniform and Rank Insignia ==
In the infantry and artillery the native officer's military dress included Indian and British elements. Foot-, leg- and headwear were usually based on that of the local enlisted men. By contrast, the coatee was often similar to that of the British officers. In the cavalry, especially in irregular units, the native officer's uniform could mirror entirely Indian style, when being richly ornamented with additional braids and embroidery.

In the 18th and early 19th centuries, rank insignia in cavalry and horse artillery consisted of varying sets of gold or silver cuff laces. For the foot arms, i.e. infantry, native foot artillery (Golundauze) and engineers, the rank insignia developed roughly as follows: A red waist sash and one or two gold epaulettes (depending on rank and era), that were smaller and of different style than those of European commissioned officers; native officers in grenadier companies wore a pair of shoulder wings. Also common were tight-fitting rows of white beads around the neck: for Jemadars one row, for Subedars two rows.

When British Army officer rank insignia switched generally from laces or epaulettes to collar-worn rank insignia in the mid-1850s, native officers also followed suit. Jemadars wore one gold sword, Subedars two crossed gold swords on each side of the collar, Subedar-Majors one gold crown. On collarless clothing, such as the Zouave jacket, one insignia only sat at the top of the right chest. Gurkha VCOs were characterized by miniature kukris, edges downward, instead of the sword insignia. In place of the epaulettes, a pair of crimson worsted silk cords were prescribed. From about 1856 commissioned officers and VCOs wore the sash over the right shoulder (from 1859 Havildars over the left shoulder).

Since 1888 (Gurkhas 1891), rank insignia was worn on the shoulder-straps or shoulder-chains. From those dates on, the VCO's embroidered rank insignia (metal for full dress since 1906) were usually silver, while those of the (European) commissioned officers were gold. Jemadars wore one star, Subadars and Rissaldars had two stars. In the Bombay Cavalry, Rissaldar and Ressaidar shared the same rank insignia, e.g. two silver metal stars. VCOs in Gurkha regiments wore bronze or black insignia; the latter on the black shoulder cords of their rifle green tunics. In the Indian Infantry, the Subadar-Major's insignia was one silver metal crown. In contrast, Rissaldar-Majors in the Indian Cavalry had three silver metal stars only, before the insignia changed to a metal crown. From the middle of the Second World War a yellow and red stripe had to be worn under the insignia.

Until the late 19th century, the placement of Subadar-Major in the VCO-hierarchy of the Madras Army could vary. While in Bengal and in Bombay Cavalry the ranks Rissaldar and Rissaldar-Major were established, they were not in Madras Cavalry. There, the VCO-hierarchy was Jemadar - Subadar - Subadar-Major at least until 1885. The rank insignia of a Subadar-Major in the Madras Cavalry was three gold metal stars, while his colleague in the Madras Infantry wore one embroidered silver crown.

== Variety of rank spellings ==
The spellings of the VCO ranks could vary significantly, mostly from presidency army to presidency army. Besides, there was also variation within the same army, between its different arms and bodies. For example, one finds for Rissaldar also Risaldar, Ressaldar and even Russuldar (in Bombay Cavalry only), at the same time. The spelling Ressalder was also known. Jemedar would alternatively spelled Jamadar or Jammadar, and Wurdie-Major could stand for Woordie-Major. At the beginning of the 19th century Subadar was alternatively spelled Soobahdar.

== See also ==
- Effendi, Governor's Commissioned Officer in the King's African Rifles (KAR)
