= Ressaidar =

Ressaidar was a Viceroy's commissioned officer's (VCO) rank in the British Indian Army. Ressaidar denoted a junior commander of a risala or risalah (a body of horse, regardless if troop or regiment) in Persian.

This native Officer's rank existed in Cavalry only, there was never a corresponding position in the other arms. A Ressaidar was a junior troop commander, so he could be regarded as native junior 'Captain'. He was usually the head of the second troop of a squadron, while the first troop was led by a Risaldar, who was a native senior 'Captain'.

During the British Raj, a Ressaidar ranked above Jemadar or Naib-Risaldar (rank abolished in 1865) and below Risaldar (with the latter he was sometimes confused with, even by authors of military literature). A Ressaidar was roughly equivalent to a 'Captain, 2nd Class' or 'Captain lieutenant', but in World War I, he was classified as native 'Lieutenant'. Nevertheless, all VCO's were always outranked by the lowest british Officer with a full commission.

The rank of Ressaidar was abolished with effect from 1st April 1921. Indian Officers then holding that rank were to be promoted to Risaldar.
