= Junior commissioned officer =

Military personnel classification

Junior commissioned officer (JCO) is a group of military ranks which is higher than havildar/sergeant (non-commissioned officer) and lower than lieutenant (commissioned officer). The term is only used by Nepal, Bangladesh, India, and Pakistan. Senior havildars are promoted to JCO rank on the basis of merit and seniority, restricted by the number of vacancies. JCOs are treated as a separate class and hold additional privileges. The term was primarily associated with armies; however, since the 2000s, India and Pakistan's navies and air forces have also used the term to indicate their chief petty officers and warrant officers.

== History ==
The JCO evolved from the native commissioned officers of the Presidency armies, who held commissions from the Governor General. The native commissioned officers developed into the viceroy's commissioned officers (VCOs), established in the British Indian Army during the British Raj in 1885. Gurkha regiments in British service had also their set of 'native officers' resp. VCOs, although their homeland Nepal was never a British colony.

Under the British, there was a clear colonial context, with the VCOs being the highest ranks an Indian could attain. The full commissioned officers were British, from the 18th century to the beginning of the 20th century. However, that changed slowly under the principles of Indianisation. In 1905, a special form of a king's Commission in His Majesty's Native Land Forces was instituted. Indians who had qualified through the Imperial Cadet Corps would earn a commission that was limited to having authority over Indian troops only. Its holders could not rise above major. From 1917, in the midst of World War I, Indians 'with good family background' became eligible to study at the Royal Military College, Sandhurst and earn a commission as King's Commissioned Indian Officer (KCIO). By the time of independence in 1947, there were many Indian (and Pakistani) officers who had graduated from Sandhurst or the Indian Military Academy. In 1945 the Willcox Committee Report recommended that VCOs be phased out, though this never occurred.

The Indian Army has recruited Gurkha soldiers from Nepal since the 19th century and separate Gurkha regiments were created for them, the Gurkha soldiers got same ranks as other Indian soldiers; the modern Nepal Army officially used the Indian Army rank system for their soldiers in the 1960s through a series of reorganizations and the JCO term has been used by them from then. After the secession of East Pakistan in 1971, the Bangladesh Army inherited the JCO rank system from the Pakistan Army.

== Current ranks ==
=== Bangladesh ===
Rank group	Junior commissioned officers
Bangladesh Army
Bangladesh Army	মাস্টার ওয়ারেন্ট অফিসার; Māsṭār ōẏārēnṭ ôphisār	সিনিয়র ওয়ারেন্ট অফিসার; Siniẏar ōẏārēnṭ ôphisār	ওয়ারেন্ট অফিসার; Ōẏārēnṭ ôphisār
Bangladesh Navy
Bangladesh Navy	মাস্টার চীফ পেটি অফিসার; Māsṭār chīph pēṭi ôphisār	সিনিয়র চীফ পেটি অফিসার; Siniẏar chīph pēṭi ôphisār	চীফ পেটি অফিসার; Chīph pēṭi ôphisār
Bangladesh Air Force
Bangladesh Air Force	মাস্টার ওয়ারেন্ট অফিসার; Māsṭār ōẏārēnṭ ôphisār	সিনিয়র ওয়ারেন্ট অফিসার; Siniẏar ōẏārēnṭ ôphisār	ওয়ারেন্ট অফিসার; Ōẏārēnṭ ôphisār
Rank group	Junior commissioned officers

==== Paramilitary forces ====
Rank group	Junior commissioned officers
Bangladesh Coast Guard
Bangladesh Coast Guard	মাস্টার চীফ পেটি অফিসার; Māsṭāra cīpha pēṭi aphisāra	সিনিয়র চীফ পেটি অফিসার; Siniẏara cīpha pēṭi aphisāra	চীফ পেটি অফিসার; Cīpha pēṭi aphisāra
Border Guard Bangladesh
Border Guard Bangladesh	Subedar Major	Subedar	Naib Subedar
Rank group	Junior commissioned officers

=== India ===
The pay scale for Indian Army's Naib Subedar, Subedar and Subedar Major ranks are levels 6, 7 and 8, respectively.

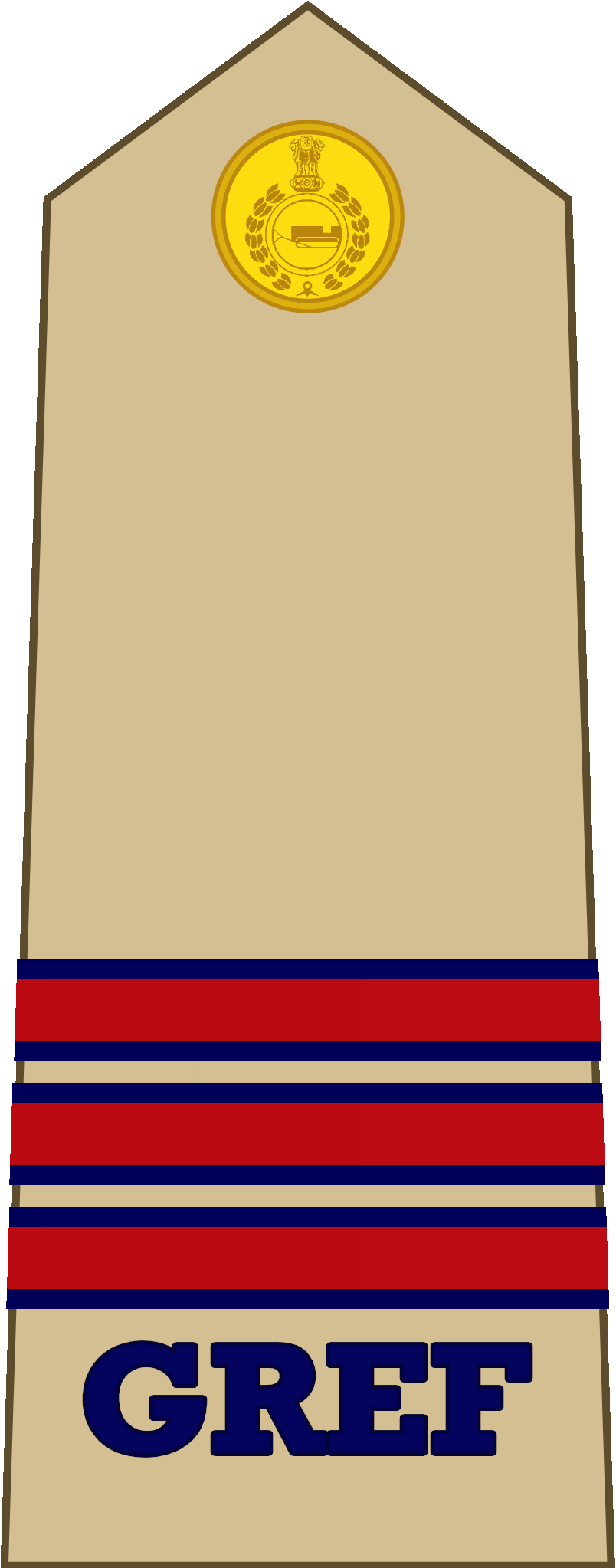
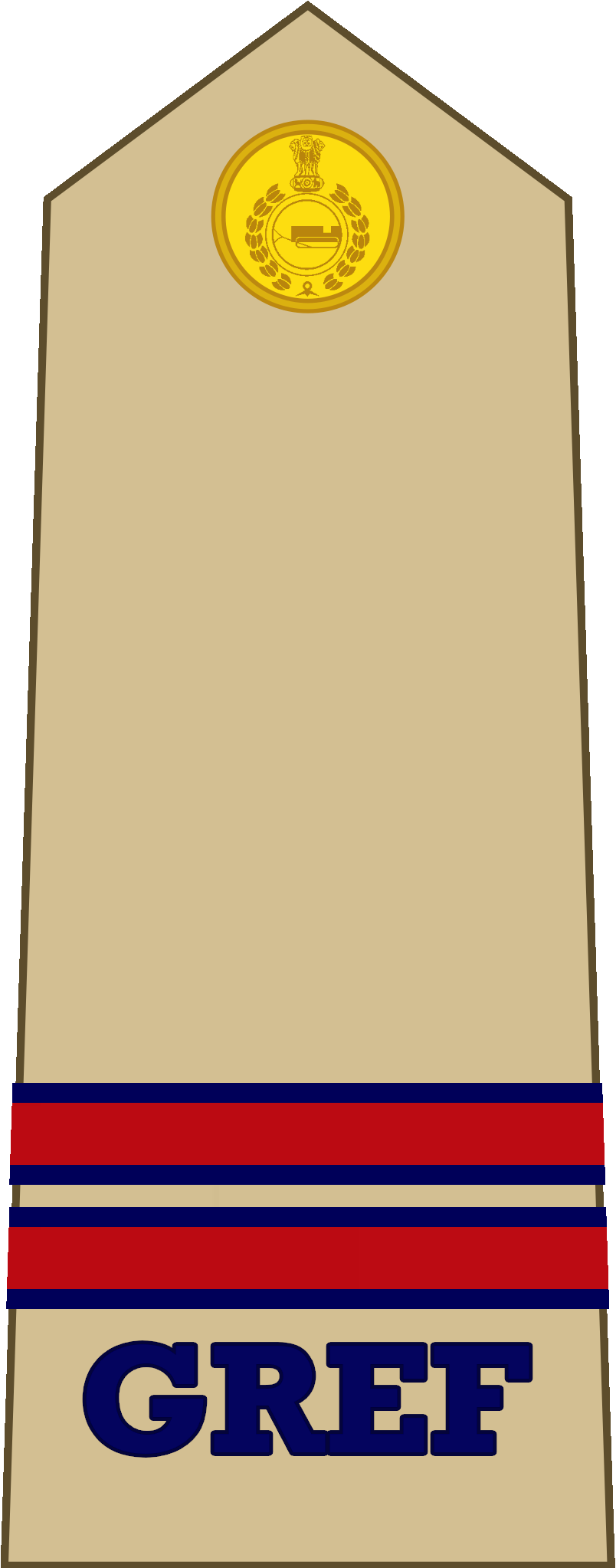
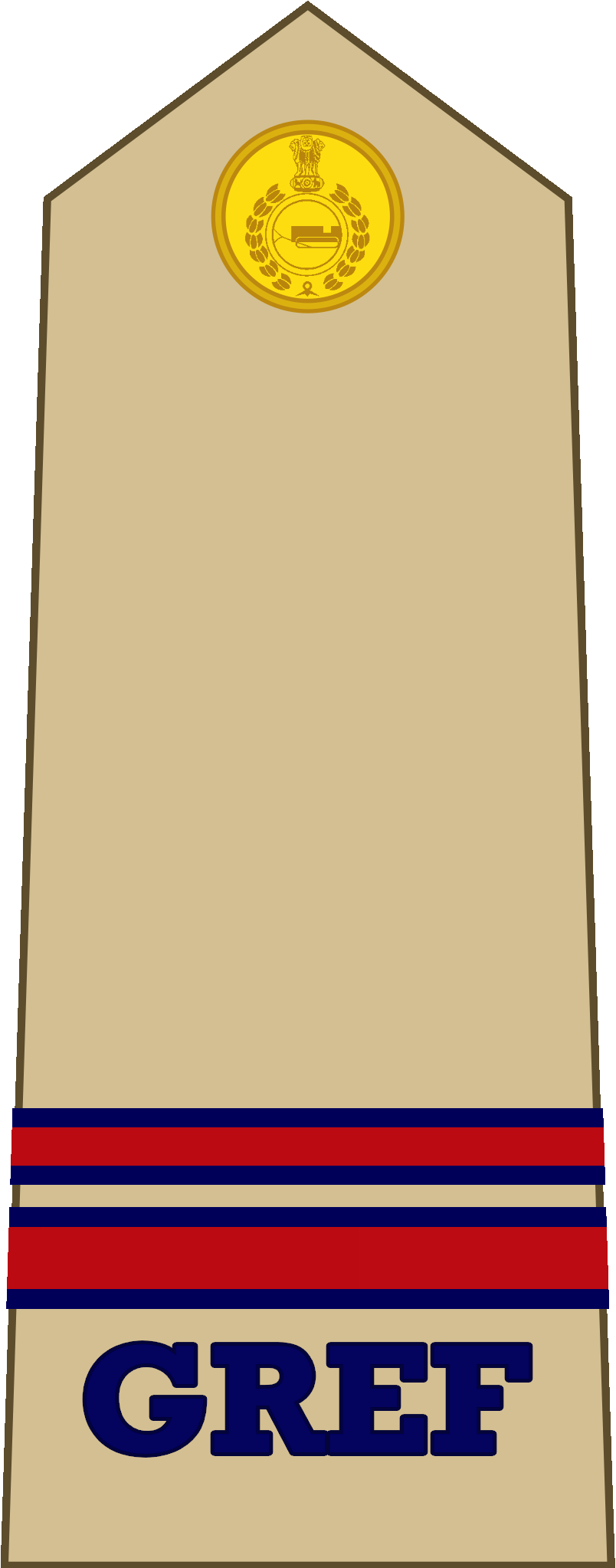
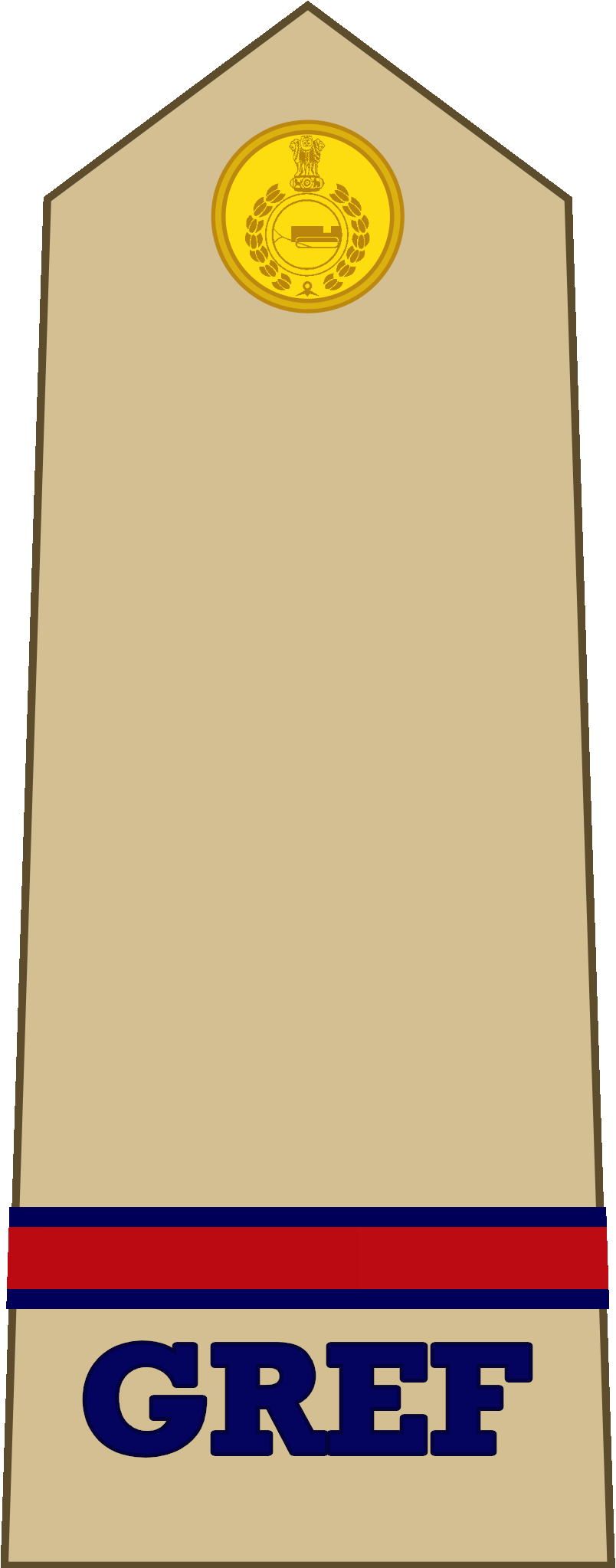
Rank group	Junior commissioned officers
Indian Army
Infantry ranks	Subedar Major सूबेदार मेजर	Subedar सूबेदार	Naib Subedar नायब सूबेदार
Cavalry ranks	Risaldar Major रिसालदार मेजर	Risaldar रिसालदार	Naib Risaldar नायब रिसालदार
Indian Navy
Indian Navy	Master chief petty officer 1st class मास्टर चीफ पेटी ऑफिसर फर्स्ट क्लास	Master chief petty officer 2nd class मास्टर चीफ पेटी ऑफिसर सेकेंड क्लास	Chief petty officer चीफ पेटी ऑफिसर
Technical Ranks	Master chief engine room artificer 1st class (MCERA I)	Master chief engine room artificer 2nd class (MCERA II)	Chief engine room artificer III (ERA III)
Indian Air Force
Indian Air Force	Master warrant officer मास्टर वारंट अफसर	Warrant officer वारंट अफसर	Junior warrant officer जूनियर वारंट अफसर
Indian Border; Roads Organisation
Indian Border; Roads Organisation	Senior translation officer	Junior engineer/Senior supervisor/Superintendent/Translation officer	Assistant superintendent	Supervisor
Rank group	Junior commissioned officers

==== Auxiliary forces ====
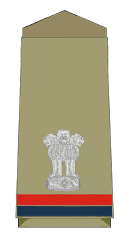
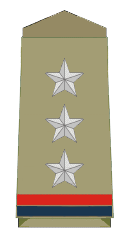
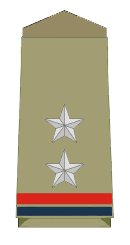
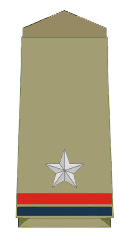
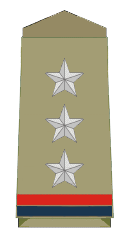
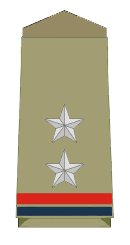
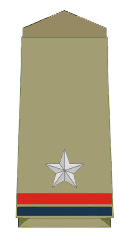
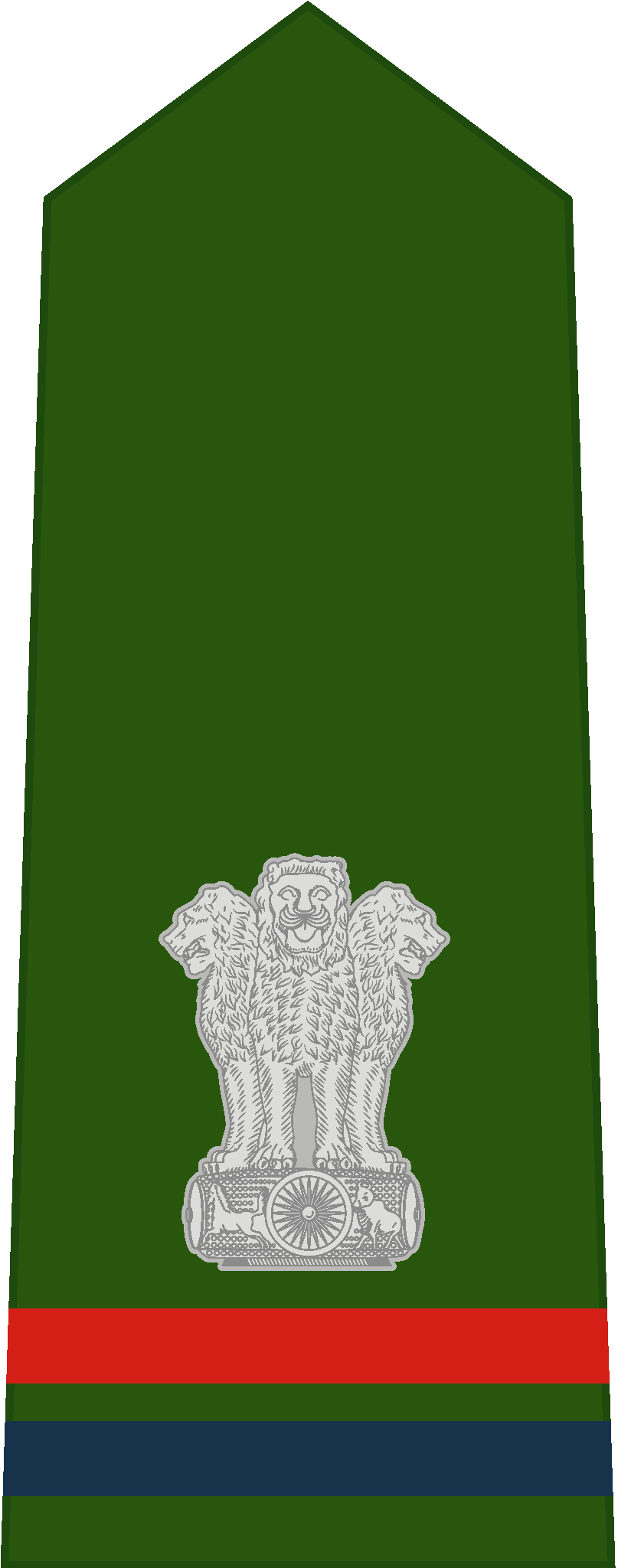
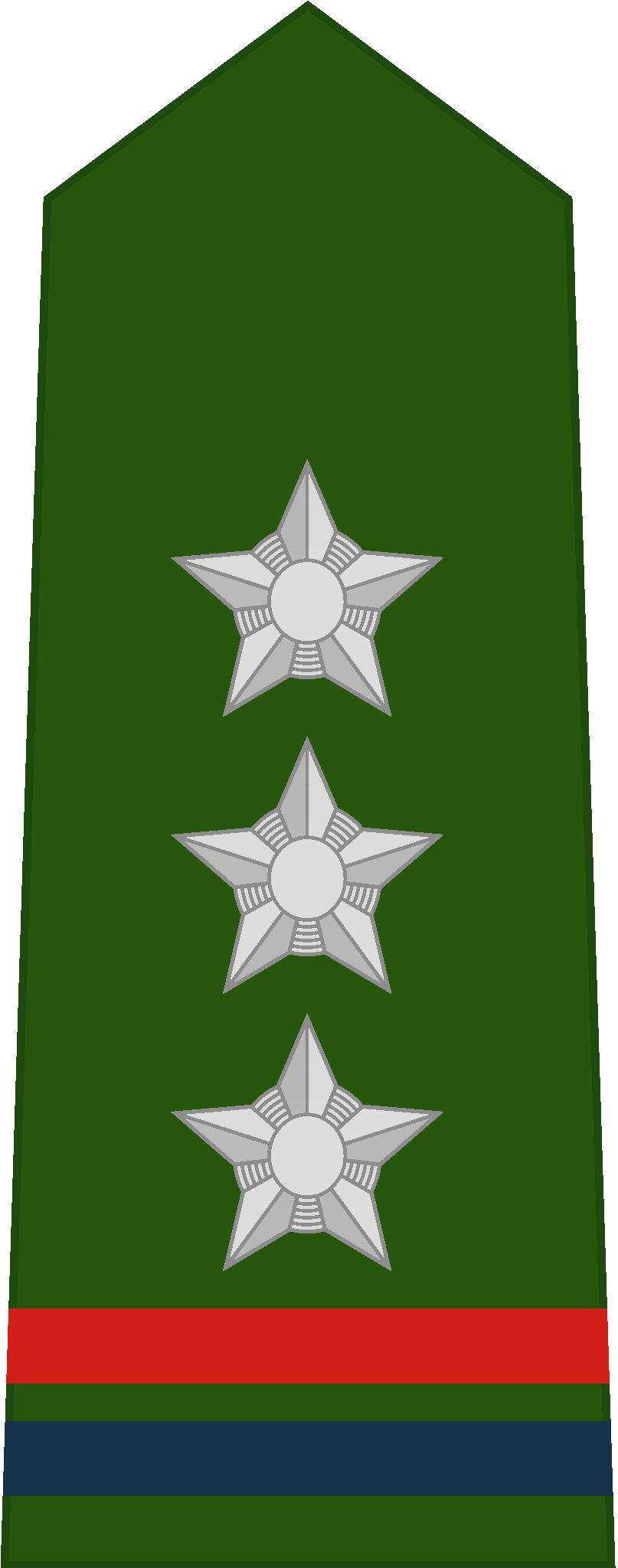
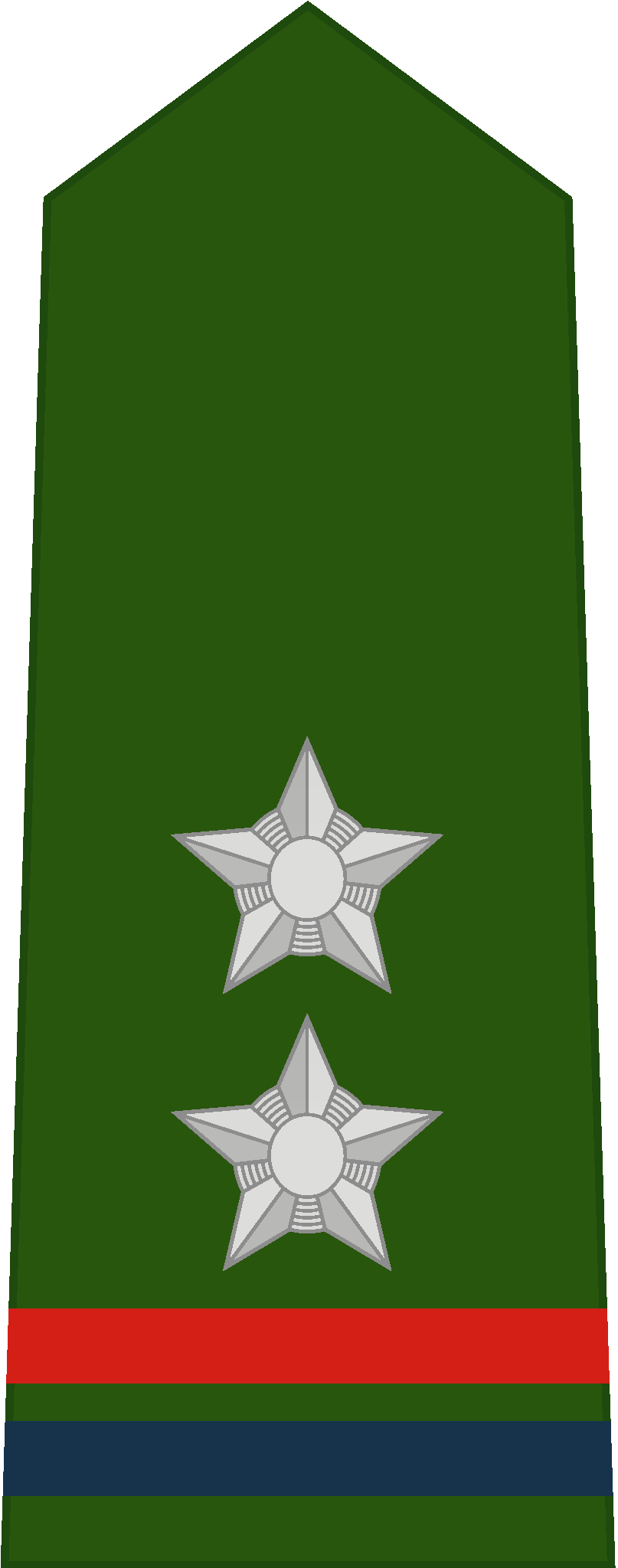
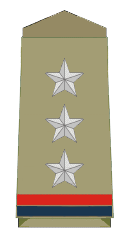
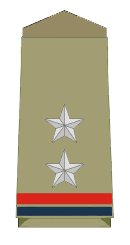
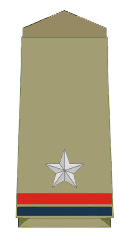
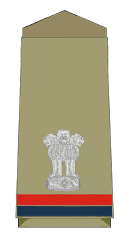
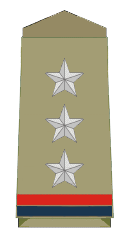
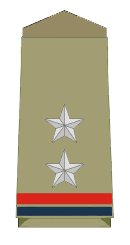
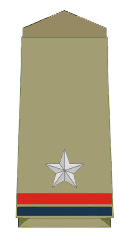
Rank group	Junior commissioned officers
Indian Coast Guard
Indian Coast Guard	Pradhan Adhikari; Pradhan Sahayak Engineer	Uttam Adhikari; Uttam Sahayak Engineer		Adhikari; Sahayak Engineer
Assam Rifles
Assam Rifles	Subedar major सूबेदार मेजर	Subedar सूबेदार		Naib subedar नायब सूबेदार
Border Security Force
Border Security Force	Subedar major सूबेदार मेजर	Inspector निरीक्षक	Sub-inspector उप निरीक्षक	Assistant sub-inspector सहायक उप निरीक्षक
Central Industrial Security Force
Central Industrial Security Force		Inspector निरीक्षक	Sub inspector उप निरीक्षक	Assistant sub-inspector सहायक उप निरीक्षक
Central Reserve Police Force
Central Reserve Police Force	Subedar major सूबेदार मेजर	Inspector निरीक्षक	Sub-inspector उप निरीक्षक	Assistant sub-inspector सहायक उप निरीक्षक
Indo-Tibetan Border Police
Indo-Tibetan Border Police	Subedar major सूबेदार मेजर	Subedar/Inspector सूबेदार/निरीक्षक	Sub inspector उप निरीक्षक
National Security Guard
National Security Guard	Subedar major सूबेदार मेजर	Assistant commander-1 -	Assistant commander-2 -	Assistant commander-3 -
Railway Protection Force
Railway Protection Force		Inspector निरीक्षक	Sub inspector उप निरीक्षक	Assistant sub-inspector सहायक उप निरीक्षक
Sashastra Seema Bal
Sashastra Seema Bal	Subedar major सूबेदार मेजर	Inspector निरीक्षक	Sub inspector उप निरीक्षक	Assistant sub-inspector सहायक उप निरीक्षक
Special Frontier Force
Special Frontier Force	Subedar Major	Subedar		Naib Subedar
Rank group	Junior commissioned officers

=== Nepal ===
Rank group	Junior commissioned officers
Nepali Army
Nepali Army	प्रमुख सुवेदार; Pramukh Suvēdār	सुवेदार; Suvēdār	जमदार; Jamadār

=== Pakistan ===
Rank group	Junior commissioned officers
Pakistan Army
Infantry ranks	Subedar-major صوبیدار میجر	Subedar صوبیدار	Naib subedar نائب صوبیدار
Cavalry ranks	Risaldar major رسالدار میجر	Risaldar رسالدار	Naib risaldar نائب رسالدار
Pakistan Navy
Pakistan Navy	Master chief petty officer ماسٹر چیف پیٹی آفیسر	Fleet chief petty officer فلیٹ چیف پیٹی آفیسر	Chief petty officer چیف پیٹی آفیسر
Pakistan Air Force
Pakistan Air Force	Chief warrant officer	Warrant officer	Assistant warrant officer
Rank group	Junior commissioned officers

==== Paramilitary forces ====
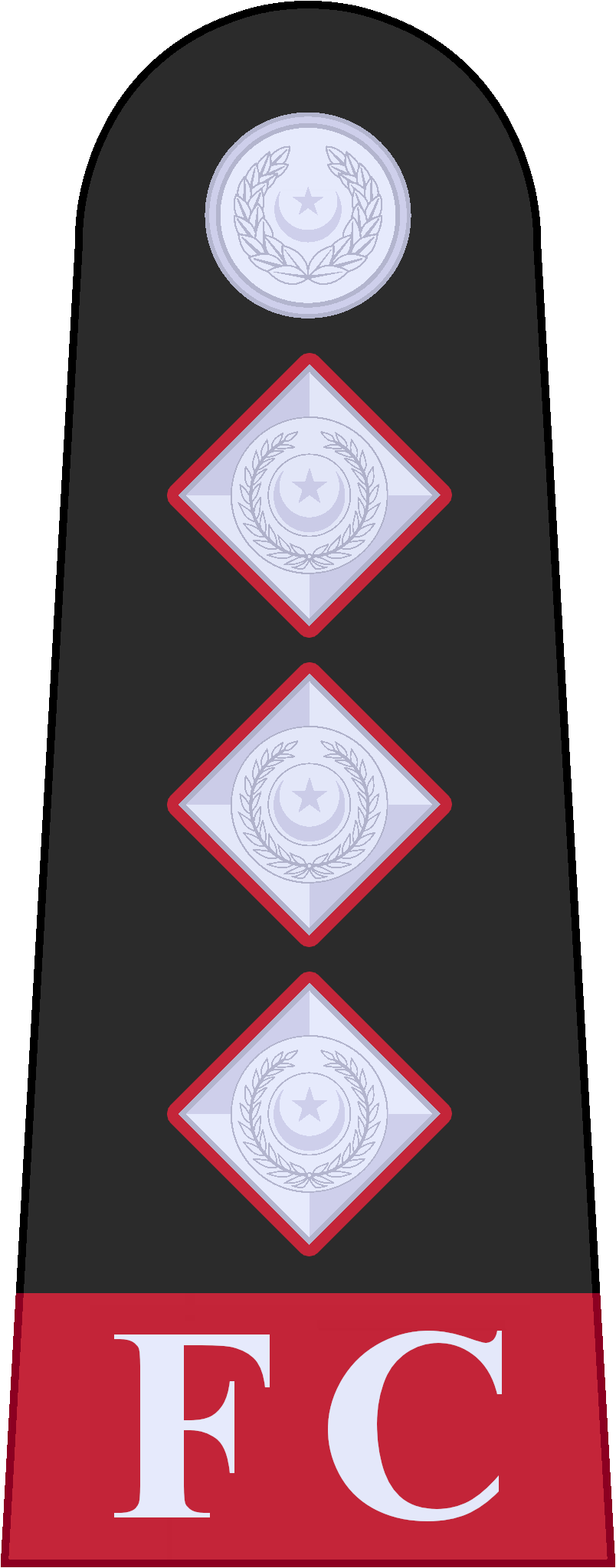
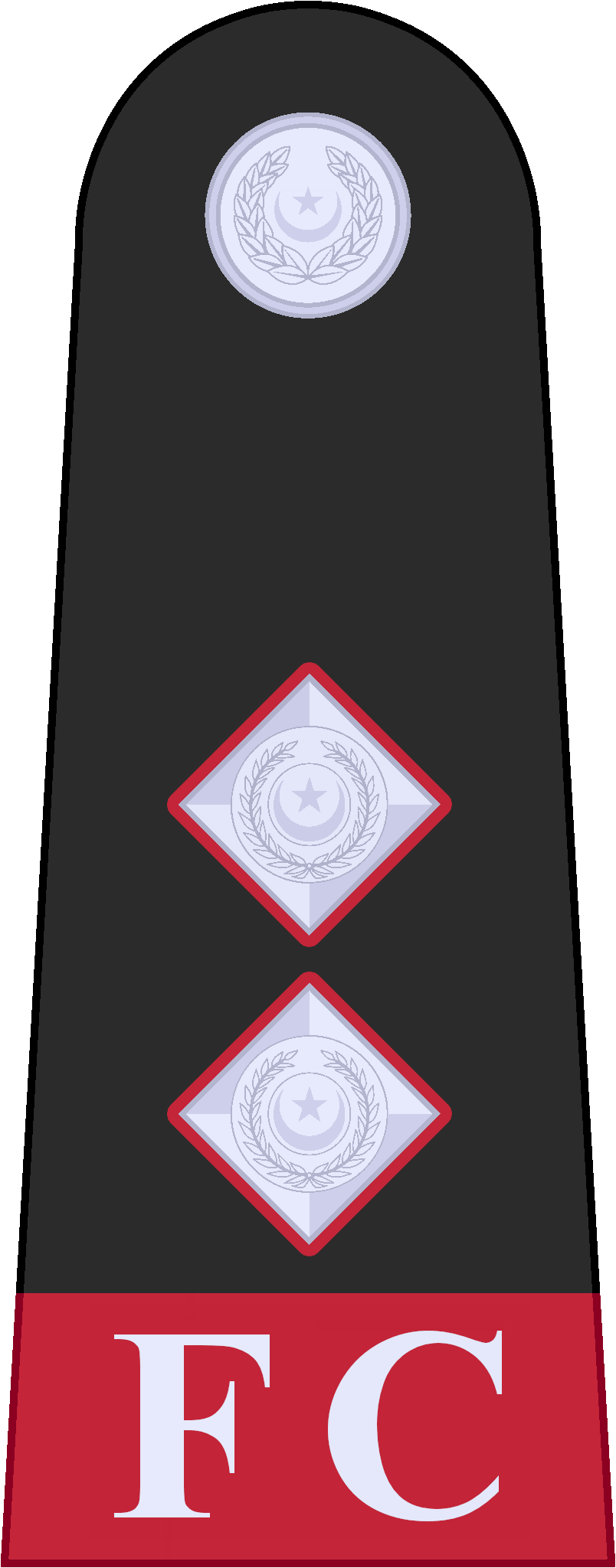
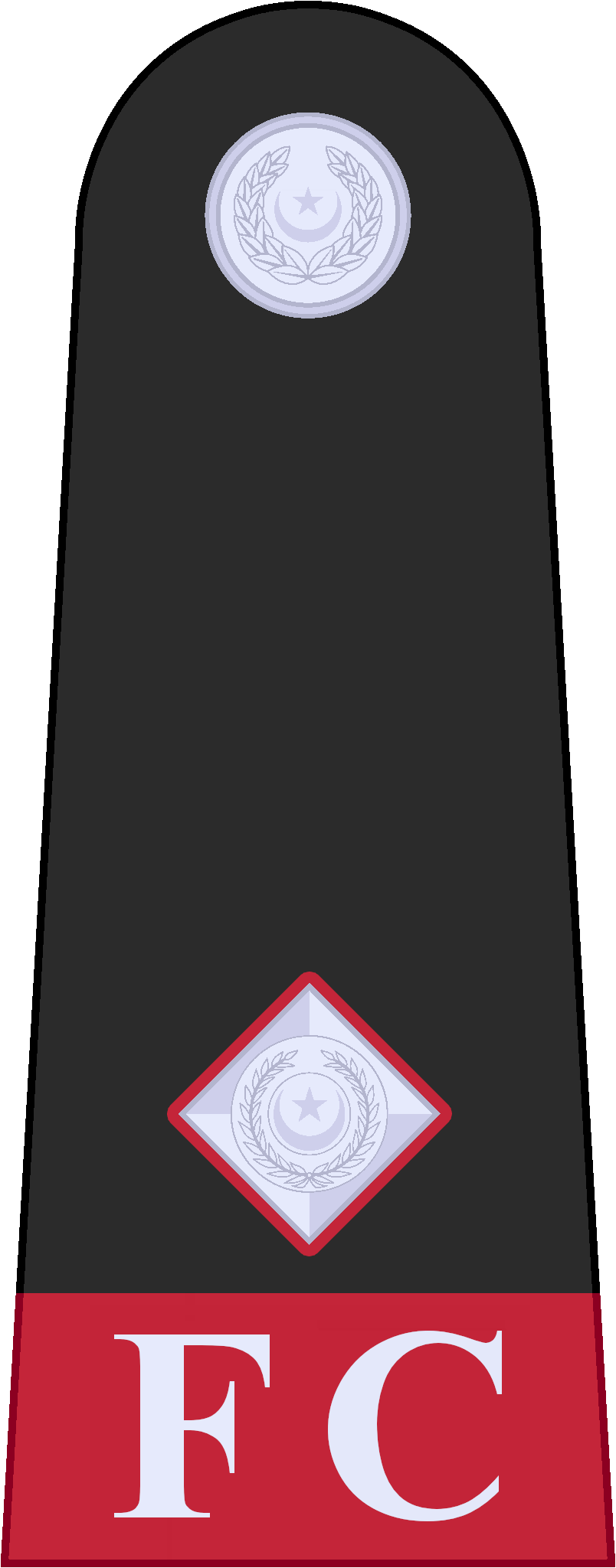
Rank group	Junior commissioned officers
Pakistan Rangers
Pakistan Rangers	Senior inspector سینئر انسپکٹر۔	Inspector انسپکٹر	Sub inspector سب انسپکٹر۔
Pakistan; Federal Constabulary
Pakistan; Federal Constabulary	Subedar-Major صوبیدار میجر	Subedar صوبیدار	Naib Subedar نائب صوبیدار
Pakistan Frontier Corps
Pakistan Frontier Corps		Subedar صوبیدار	Naib subedar نائب صوبیدار	Head constable ہیڈ کانسٹیبل۔
Gilgit−Baltistan Scouts
Gilgit−Baltistan Scouts	Subedar-Major صوبیدار میجر	Subedar صوبیدار	Naib Subedar نائب صوبیدار
Pakistan Coast Guards
Pakistan Coast Guards	Subedar-Major صوبیدار میجر	Subedar صوبیدار	Naib Subedar نائب صوبیدار
Airports Security Force
Airports Security Force	Inspector انسپکٹر	Sub-inspector سب انسپکٹر	Assistant sub-inspector اسسٹنٹ سب انسپکٹر
Pakistan Maritime Security Agency
Pakistan Maritime Security Agency	Master Chief Petty Officer ماسٹر چیف پیٹی آفیسر۔	Fleet Chief Petty Officer فلیٹ چیف پیٹی آفیسر۔	Chief Petty Officer چیف پیٹی آفیسر۔
Rank group	Junior commissioned officers

== Honorary commissions ==
There is also a custom of giving honorary commissions to deserving JCOs. Every year a list of eligible JCOs is drawn up and honorary commissions awarded to them. This could be at the time of retirement, or when still in service. Honorary commissioned officers may wear the appropriate rank insignia, but they do not become members of the officers' mess. They do, however, receive the pay and pension of their honorary rank. The honorary ranks in the various forces are:

Indian Army:

- Honorary Lieutenant
- Honorary Captain

Indian Navy:

- Honorary Sub Lieutenant
- Honorary Lieutenant

Indian Air Force:

- Honorary Flying Officer
- Honorary Flight Lieutenant

Generally, in official documents the JCO rank held by the person is also added before the Honorary Commission rank.
