= Indian Order of Merit =

Award

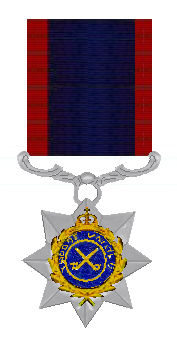
- Indian Order of Merit (2nd Class, Military Division) (top); Ribbon (bottom)

Awarded by the British monarch
- Type: Military decoration
- Established: 1837
- Eligibility: Indian citizens in the armed forces and civilians (civilian division)
- Awarded for: Gallantry
- Status: Discontinued in 1947
- Post-nominals: IOM

Precedence
- Next (higher): Victoria Cross

The Indian Order of Merit (IOM) was a military and civilian decoration of British India. It was established in 1837, (General Order of the Governor-General of India, No. 94 of 1 May 1837) although following the Partition of India in 1947 it was decided to discontinue the award and in 1954 a separate Indian honours system was developed, to act retrospectively to 1947. For a long period of time the IOM was the highest decoration that a native member of the British Indian Army could receive and initially it had three divisions. This was changed in 1911 when Indian servicemen became eligible for the Victoria Cross. A civilian division of the IOM also existed between 1902 and 1939, however, it was only conferred very rarely.

== History ==
The medal was first introduced by the East India Company in 1837, under the name "Order of Merit" and was taken over by the Crown in 1858, following the Indian Rebellion of 1857. The name of the medal was changed in 1902 to avoid confusion with a British Order of the same name. The Indian Order of Merit was the only gallantry medal available to Native soldiers between 1837 and 1907 when the Indian Distinguished Service Medal was introduced, and when the Victoria Cross was opened to native soldiers in 1911. Both divisions of the order were removed when India became independent in 1947. Recipients receive the post nominal letters IOM.

The original object was to "afford personal reward for personal bravery without reference to any claims founded on mere length of service and general good conduct"

== The medal ==
=== Military Division ===
The medal was originally introduced with three classes (first, second and third classes), until others medals were made available to Indian soldiers, at which point it was reduced to two classes (the Victoria Cross replacing the first class), and reduced to one class in 1944. A recipient technically needed to be in possession of the lower class before being awarded a higher class, although recipients were sometimes awarded the higher class if they performed more than one act of gallantry, then they may have been awarded the higher class, without receiving the lower one. The recipients of the order received increased pay and pension allowances and were very highly regarded.

=== Civil Division ===
A civil division was available in two classes between 1902 and 1939, when it was reduced to one class. The civil medal was rarely awarded.

== Description ==
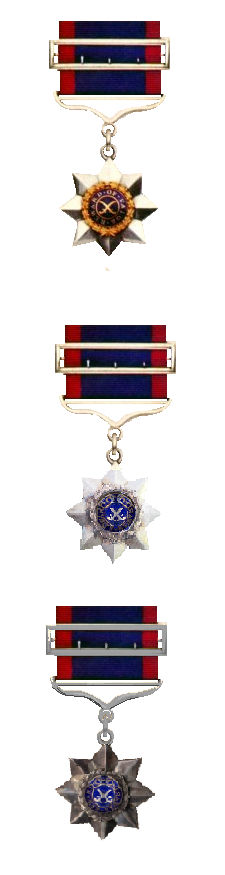
Indian Order of Merit, First, Second and Third Classes

=== Third Class ===
Eight pointed dull silver star with blue circle, surrounded by silver laurels, in the middle, with crossed swords and the words Awarded for Valour, this was changed to Awarded for Gallantry in 1944.

Conspicuous act of individual gallantry on the part of any Native Officers or Soldiers, in the Field or in the attack or defence of a Fortified place, without distinction of rank or grade.

=== Second Class ===
Eight pointed shiny silver star with blue circle, surrounded by gold laurels in the middle, with crossed swords and the words Awarded for Valour, this was changed to Awarded for Gallantry in 1944.

To be obtained by those who already possess the third and for similar services.

=== First Class ===
Eight pointed gold star with blue circle, surrounded by gold laurels in the middle, with crossed swords and the words Reward of Valor, this was changed to Awarded for Gallantry in 1944.

To be obtained in like manner only by those who possess the third and second classes.

=== Ribbon ===
Dark blue ribbon flanked by two red stripes of about a sixth of the width.

== Notable recipients ==
- Subedar Mir Dast V.C., I.O.M.
- Jemadar Jai Lal (1st Class & 2nd Class), Gaur Brahmin, 4th Battalion, 16th Punjab Regiment during"attack on sannaiyat" 17 February 1917 and with 9th Bhopalis on 21st April Battle of Istabulat
- Subedar Kishanbir Nagarkoti, I.O.M. 1/5 GR (FF) Only person to have been awarded the IOM four times and hence awarded a gold clasp as recognition.
- Maharajadhiraja Bahadur Sir Bijay Chand Mahtab G.C.I.E., K.C.S.I., I.O.M.
- Ishar Singh (havildar)
- Havildar Kabir Pun was awarded the I.O.M. for his joint actions along with John Duncan Grant who was awarded the Victoria Cross along with other members of the 8th Gurkha Rifles on 6 July 1904 at the attack at Gyantse Dzong, Tibet as a part of the British invasion of Tibet with Colonel Younghusband
- Havildar Shaikh Paltu was promoted from the rank of Sepoy to Havildar and was decorated with the Indian Order of Merit for being loyal to British officers and defending them from Mangal Pandey by grabbing him.
- Jemadar Narayan Singh 17th Dogra for his distinguished service during the Myanmar Campaign 1942
