= Risaldar-major =

Cavalry officer rank of the British Indian Army

Rank insignia of a British Indian Army Risaldar Major, 1920–1950

Risaldar-major was originally a cavalry officer rank of the British Indian Army. During the British Raj, it was the highest rank natives could achieve.

The position was introduced by the HEIC in the Native cavalry of the Presidency armies, around the year 1825. In the Native infantry of the Madras Army, the equivalent rank of Subedar-Major was established (along with Colour-havildar) already on February 2, 1819. To that date, the Bengal Army had the position of Subedar-Major introduced already, on October 28, 1817.

A risaldar-major was the most senior risaldar (army rank equivalent to a captain) of the regiment. The rank was a viceroy's commissioned officer in the cavalry. Risaldar-majors and subedar-majors would serve as a representative of their people to British officers, but could also command independent companies resp. troops of irregular regiments.

Today a risaldar-major is the senior junior commissioned officer in the Indian Army and Pakistan Army armoured corps, and remount and veterinary corps.

It carries the same responsibilities and insignia as the infantry subedar-major.
