= Jemadar =

Title used in military system in the Indian subcontinent

Jemadar or jamadar (Urdu: جیمادار, Persian: جِمادار, Arabic: جمادار) is a title used for various military and other officials in the Indian subcontinent.

== Etymology ==
The word stems from Urdu (جمعدار), which derives through Persian jam'dar from Arabic jamā‘a(t) 'muster' + Persian -dār 'holder'.

== Pre-colonial ==
Rank insignia of a British Indian Army Jemadar, 1920–1950

A jemadar was originally an armed official of a zamindar (feudal lord) in India who, like a military general, and along with Mridhas, was in charge of fighting and conducting warfare, mostly against the rebellious peasants and common people who lived on the lord's land. Also, this rank was used among thuggee bands as well, usually the gang leader.

Later, it became a rank used in the British Indian Army, where it was the lowest rank for a Viceroy's commissioned officer. Jemadars either commanded platoons or troops themselves or assisted their British commander. They also filled regimental positions such as assistant quartermaster (jemadar quartermaster) or assistant adjutant (jemadar adjutant).

== Post-colonial ==
The rank remained in use in the Indian Army until 1965 as the lowest rank of junior commissioned officer. The rank of jemadar was later renamed in both the Indian Army and the Pakistan Army as naib subedar in infantry units, and naib risaldar in cavalry and armoured corps units. Jemadar remains a warrant officer rank in the Nepal Army.

== Other uses ==
- Jemadar was also used in other contexts to denote Indian 'captains', like the leaders of thuggee bands who strangled travellers.
- Jemadar was used as a rank title for an Indian inspector in the Shanghai Municipal Police
- The name inspired that of the Star Trek enslaved warrior race known as the "Jem'Hadar"
- In the future of Edgar Rice Burroughs' novel The Moon Men, "Jemadar" was a title of a ruler, implied to have been brought to Earth by the Lunar invaders.

== See also ==
- Koli rebellions
- List of Koli people
- List of Koli states and clans
- Hatem Ali Jamadar (1872–1982), Bengali politician
- Peter Jamadar, Trinidadian judge
