= Sabaria =

Sabaria may refer to:

- Sabaria, Pannonia, a Roman city that is today Szombathely, Hungary
  - Sabaria FC, a football club in Szombathely
- Sabaria (Iberia), a medieval territory
- Sabaria (moth), or Achrosis, a moth genus

== See also ==
- Sabariah Saidan (born 1968), Malaysian politician
- Sabariya, a Gond people of Janjgir-Champa district, Chhattisgarh, India
- Sabari (disambiguation)
- Savaria (disambiguation)
