= Suebi-Frankish relations =

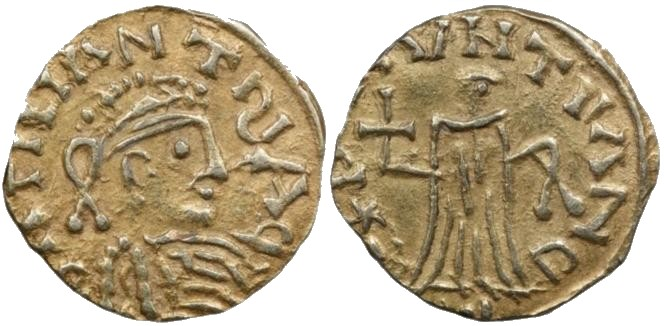
Tremissis of Guntram

The Suebi Kingdom of Galicia first established cooperative relations with the Franks, specifically with those of Guntram of Orléans, in 574 under the initiative of king Miro. The development of positive relations between these two Germanic powers revolved around the shared threat of the Visigothic Kingdom, led by their aggressive expansionist king Liuvigild. From 574 until the Gothic conquest of Galicia, the Franks supported the Suebi's endeavors by aiding the Visigothic rebel Hermenegild, invading Septimania under the pretext of Hermenegild's death, and sending a naval relief force to Galicia in an effort to save the Suebi.

== History ==
=== Establishment of relations under Visigothic pressure ===
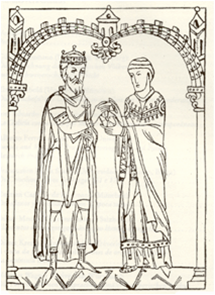
Miro standing next to Martin of Braga in a 1145 manuscript

The Visigothic king Liuvigild began a prolonged, on-and-off military campaign against the Suebi in 569, beginning with the conquest of Leon, Palencia, and Zamora. In 573, Liuvigild conquered the semi-autonomous region of Sabaria, a buffer zone between the Visigoths and Galicia. After a short-lived Suebi counterattack in Plasencia and Coria, Las Hurdes, Las Batuecas, and the territory of the Ruccones (Asturias and Cantabria), Liuvigild managed to reverse Miro's gains and established the Duchy of Cantabria as a Visigothic puppet state in 574.

Being diplomatically isolated in the northwest fringes of the Iberian Peninsula, Miro sought to ally with Guntram, king of Orléans, an established enemy of Liuvigild. In 574, the envoys that were sent to Guntram were intercepted and detained by a close ally of Liuvigild, another regional Frankish king named Chilperic I of Neustria.

This pivotal moment in which the Suebi first contacted the Franks would be the first of three instances of alliance between the two powers.

=== The revolt of prince Hermenegild ===
In 579, Hermengild, the son of Liuvigild, converted to Chalcedonian Christianity against his father's Arian faith and began a rebellion. He was persuaded to do so by his wife, a Frankish woman named Ingund who also happened to be Guntram's niece. The Suebi, Franks, and Byzantines all pledged their support to Hermenegild.

After Miro unsuccessfully attempted to link up with the rebels in Seville in 583, Hermenegild was imprisoned and later executed in April of 585. Following suit, Guntram attempted to invade the Visigothic province of Septimania, but was repulsed by Reccared, another one of Liuvigild's sons.

=== Final naval attempt to save the Suebi ===
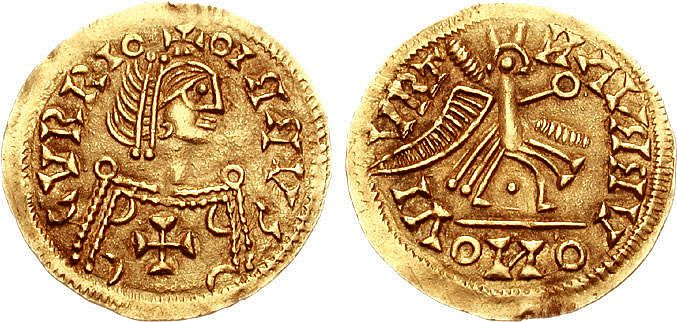
Tremissis of Liuvigild

After Miro's death in 583, a series of usurpers and pretenders came to rule the Suebi. In 585, Liuvigild invaded Galicia once more under the pretext of unseating the illegitimate usurper Andeca.

Around the same time Andeca was deposed and exiled to Beja, two events unfolded — yet another pretender named Malaric, claiming descent from Miro, declared himself King of the Suebi. Simultaneously, Guntram assembled a Frankish fleet to sail to Galicia and rescue the Suebi from the Visigothic invaders. Upon arriving, however, Liuvigild's troops intercepted the fleet, looted its cargo, and killed or enslaved the majority of its crew. Malaric, for his part, was captured by Liuvigild's generals and brought before him in chains.

With Malaric's defeat and the permanent dissolution of the Suebi Kingdom of Galicia, cordial and cooperative relations between Suebi and Franks ended for good.
