= Aversa =

- Comune
- Comune di Aversa
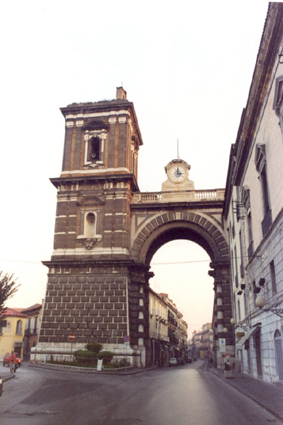
- Arco dell'Annunziata

- Coat of arms

- Location of Aversa in Caserta Province

- Location within Italy Location within Campania
- Coordinates: 40°58′N 14°12′E
- Country: Italy
- Region: Campania
- Province: Caserta (CE)

Government
  - Mayor: Francesco Matacena

Area
  - Total: 8.73 km^{2} (3.37 sq mi)
- Elevation: 39 m (128 ft)

Population (31 December 2017)
  - Total: 52,974
  - Density: 6,070/km^{2} (15,700/sq mi)
- Demonym: Aversani
- Time zone: UTC+1 (CET)
  - Summer (DST): UTC+2 (CEST)
- Postal code: 81031
- Dialing code: 081
- Patron saint: St. Paul
- Saint day: January 25
- Website: Official website

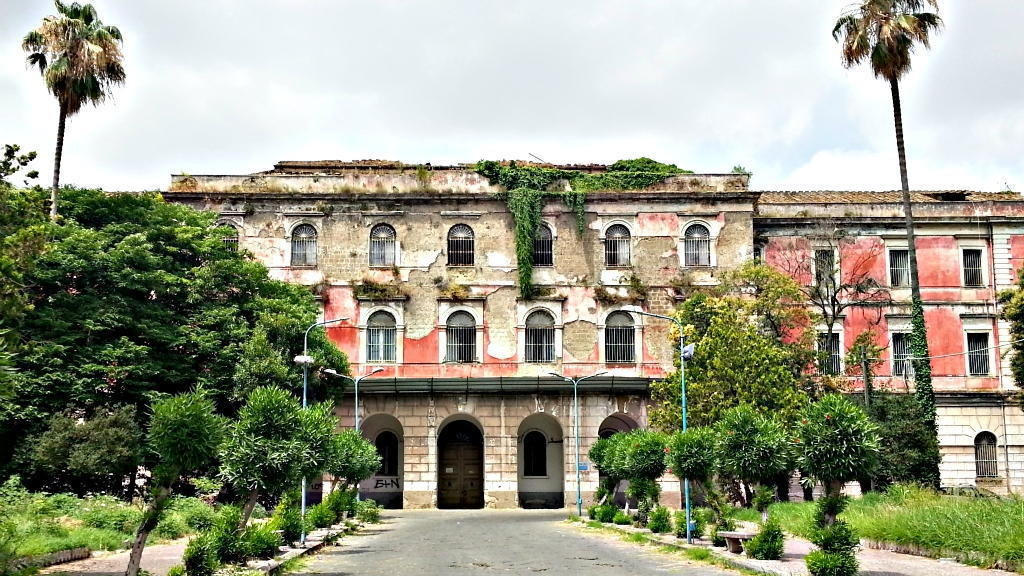
Maddalena lunatic asylum complex, built for the care of mentally ill

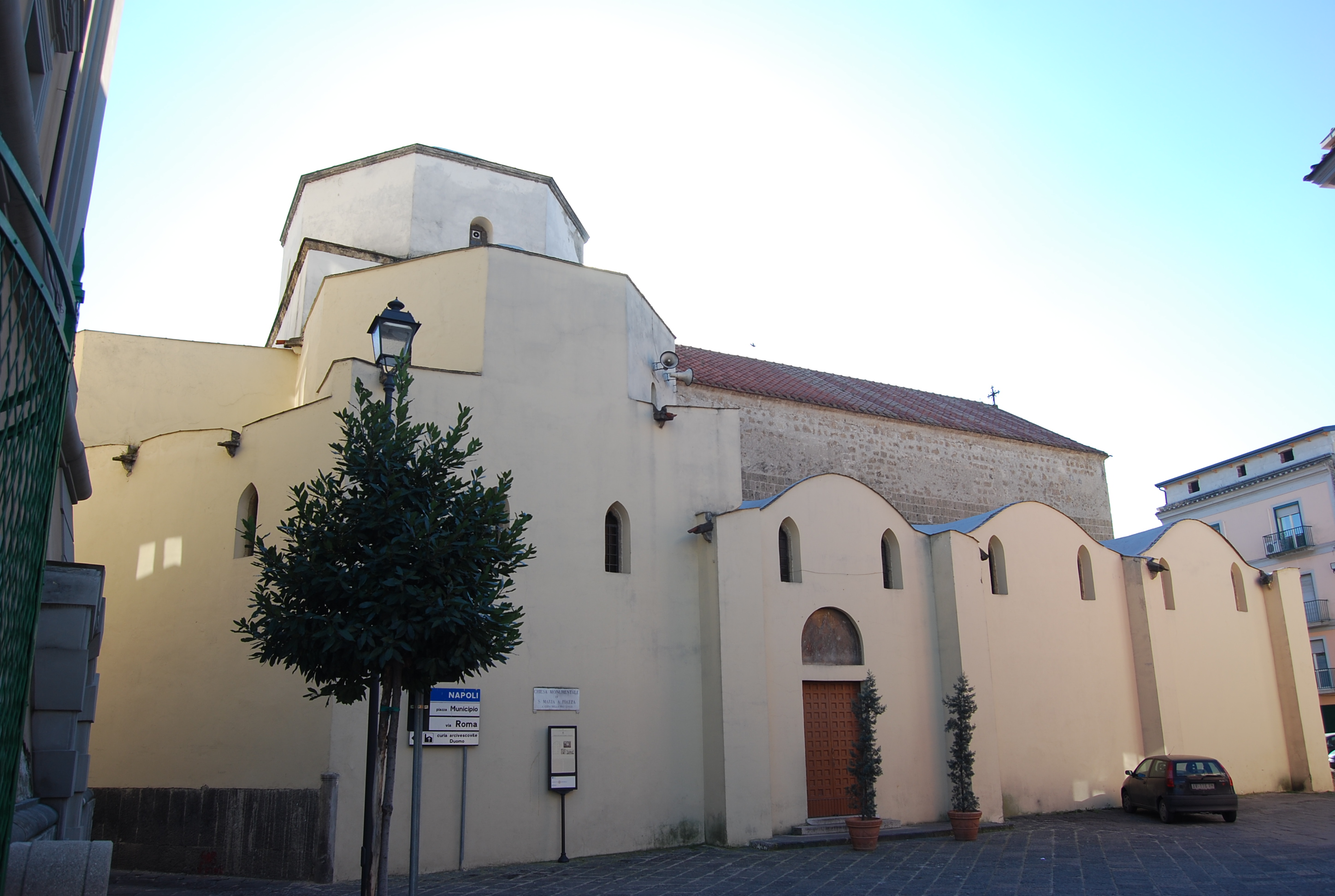
Santa Maria a Piazza Church

Aversa (Italian: [aˈvɛrsa]) is a city and comune in the Province of Caserta in Campania, southern Italy, about 24 km north of Naples. It is the centre of an agricultural district, the Agro Aversano, producing wine and cheese (famous for the typical buffalo mozzarella). Aversa is also the main seat of the faculties of Architecture and Engineering of the Università degli studi della Campania "L. Vanvitelli" (Campania University "L. Vanvitelli"). With a population of 52,974 (2017), it is the second-most populous city of the province after Caserta.

== Geography ==
Aversa is located near the city of Naples; it is separated by only 24 kilometres from Naples and by 26 kilometres from Caserta, the administrative centre of the province of the same name. The municipality borders Carinaro, Casaluce, Cesa, Frignano, Giugliano in Campania, Gricignano di Aversa, Lusciano, San Marcellino, Sant'Antimo, Teverola and Trentola Ducenta.

It is located in a fertile coastal plain north of Naples, thus serving as a market for agricultural products to the city. The plain on which it sits was known in ancient Roman times as the Campania Felix.

== History ==
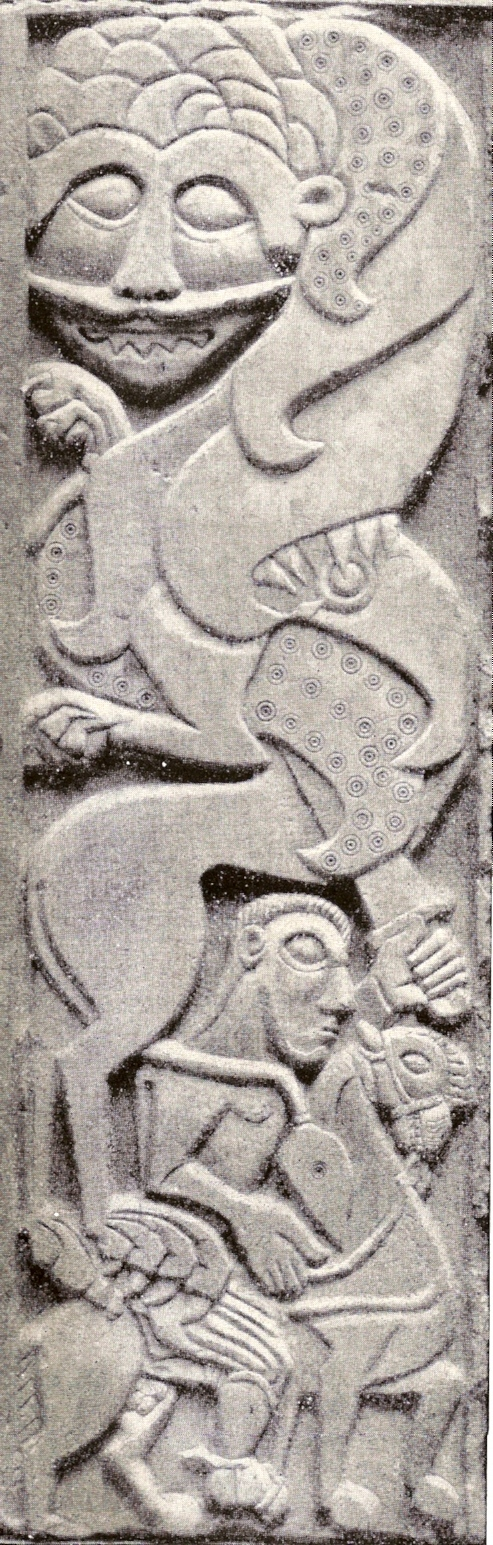
Norman relief of St. George and the Dragon in the Duomo reflects its Scandinavian precedents via Norman culture.

=== Prehistory ===
Archaeological sites excavated near Aversa have revealed human presence in the area since the Neolithic period. Some say that the founding of the ancient city took place with the Etruscans.

In any case, because of endemic malaria that ravaged the region, the primitive city was abandoned.

=== Lower middle ages ===
Only a small military fortification, a castellum, still stands in the area, which is linked to a chapel in memory of the current alleged passage through Aversa by the Apostle Paul in the year 61. A.D., via the Roman road that ran towards Rome.

=== Aversa County ===
See also List of counts of Aversa.

The present-day Aversa, which replaced the nearby city of Atella that had been laid waste during the Gothic Wars, was the first of the Norman territories in the Mediterranean. In 1030, the site was ceded to Rainulf Drengot, a cadet of the lords of Quarrel near Alençon in Normandy; he was invested as count by Duke Sergius IV of Naples and confirmed by Emperor Conrad II. By offering a generous principle of asylum for the persecuted, Rainulf enlarged the power and importance of his little borgo, which became the base from which the Normans forged a state in Sicily and Italy. The diplomacy of Robert Guiscard, who built the fortifications, led to the investiture of a bishop responsible to the Pope at Aversa, which was nominally territory of the Eastern Emperor. One of the first bishops was the Norman Guitmund (died c. 1090–95), a Benedictine monk, theologian, and opponent of Berengar of Tours.

The count of Aversa, Richard I, was one of the chief leaders in the struggle against the Papal forces which culminated in the Battle of Civitella del Fortore (1053) in Beneventan territory; even Pope Leo IX himself was captured at what turned into a rout in favour of the Normans. The astute Richard did not treat the pope as a prisoner, however, but escorted him back to Rome with full honours, a gesture that led to the conciliation of the Normans with the Church, the lifting of the ban of excommunication that had been laid upon Aversa.

=== Angevins ===
After the Norman dynasty Aversa declined in importance: the Angevin kings of Naples came to Aversa mostly to hunt and hold court in the citadel, of which a few traces remain in via Roma in Aversa's historic centre. In particular Queen Joanna I chose Aversa for her preferred seat. There a group of nobles threw her husband Andrew from a window with a rope around his neck. His brother, King Louis I of Hungary, head of the Capetian House of Anjou, marched into Italy and at Aversa took his vengeance at a banquet of reconciliation, as Joanna escaped to Avignon.

The presence of the court also benefitted Aversa by the institution of the Real Casa dell'Annunziata (about 1315) an orphanage and hospice that occupied a central place in Aversan public life.

=== Crown of Aragon ===
When Alfonso V of Aragon permanently enthroned the kingdom of Naples within the domains of the Crown of Aragon, Aversa continued to maintain the privileges it had enjoyed. Soon the epidemics and subdivisions of land caused it to be relegated as a peripheral urban center of Naples.

=== Fifteenth century ===
In the fourteenth or fifteenth century the County of Aversa was taken over by a family from Valencia, the Pròixida. In fact, the palace of the Count of Almenara in Almenara (Castellón) is also known as the palace of the Count of Aversa.

== Gastronomy ==
=== Aversa DOC ===
Italian wine, both white and sparkling, under the Aversa DOC appellation comes from this area. Grapes destined for DOC product must be harvested to a maximum yield of 14 tonnes/hectare with the finished wines fermented to a minimum alcohol level of 10.5% for still and 11% for the spumante style.

The primary grape variety of the region is the Asprinio which must constitute at least 85% of the wines, with other local white grape varieties, such as Fiano, Trebbiano and Greco permitted to fill in the remainder. Viticulture in Aversa is unique for its use of growing the grapevines with poplar trees acting as trellises. This traditional method of trellising means that almost all harvesting is done by hand.

== Main sights ==
Aversa, the second in historic importance of the dioceses of Campania, is the "city of a hundred churches" in its extensive historic center. Among its monuments:

- The Romanesque Duomo, dedicated to Saint Paul, has a spectacular ambulatory and a majestic octagonal dome. Francesco Solimena's Madonna of the Gonfaloneand the Quattrocento painter Angiolillo Arcuccio's Martyrdom of St Sebastian are in the Duomo. The pre-Romanesque sculpture of St George and the Dragon is one of the few surviving free-standing sculptures of its date. An outstanding collection of Baroque liturgical silver is kept in the Treasury.
- The Baroque Church of San Francesco delle Monache.
- The Ospedale Psichiatrico Santa Maria Maddalena founded by Joachim Murat in 1813 which was the oldest Judicial Psychiatric Hospital in Italy and the center of many accusations of abuse.
- The Real Casa dell'Annunziata.
- The Benedictine Abbey of San Lorenzo, founded in the 10th century, with a fine Renaissance cloister.
- The Church of Santa Maria a Piazza, founded in the 10th century, has frescoes of the school of Giotto.
- Other churches in the city conserve paintings by Guido da Siena, Polidoro da Caravaggio, Marco Pino da Siena, Pietro da Cortona, Pietro Negroni il Giovane Zingaro, Giuseppe Ribera, Cornelius Smeet, Abram Vink, Teodoro d'Errico, Francesco de Mura, Massimo Stanzione, and Paolo de Maio.
- The Historic Former Railway station (Stazione Ferrovia Napoli Piedimonte D'Alife) of a long closed 1913 railway
- The Historic Aragonese Castle which now houses the seat of the Court of North Naples

== Transportation ==
Aversa railway station is a major station on the Rome–Formia–Naples railway. Most of the traffic is operated by Trenitalia, although some trains run under the aegis of Italo Nuovo Trasporto Viaggiatori and EAV. Aversa is served by a suburban train, on the Naples–Aversa railway, that connects its stations (Aversa Centro and Aversa Ippodromo) with Piscinola, northern Naples, on the Line 1 of Naples Metro.

The nearest airport is that of Napoli-Capodichino, 10 kilometres (6 miles) away.

Aversa is connected to the A1 Motorway by the SP 335-VI Provincial Road (former SS 265 State Road) and the SS 7 bis. Public bus transport is responsibility of the CTP (Compagnia Trasporti Pubblici Napoli), which serves Aversa with several motorbus routes and one trolleybus route.

== Sport ==
The local football club is the Aversa Normanna, founded in 1925, and its home ground is the Augusto Bisceglia Stadium.

== Notable people ==
- Vincenzo Caianiello, jurist
- Domenico Cimarosa, opera composer
- Niccolò Jommelli, classical composer
- Antonio Ruberti, politician and engineer
- Lennie Tristano, jazz pianist and composer
- Alessandro Verde, Roman Catholic cardinal
- Caterina Balivo, Showgirl
- Giovanni Di Giorgio, painter

== Twin towns ==
- Pratola Serra, Italy
- Alife, Italy

== See also ==
- Roman Catholic Diocese of Aversa
