= Savaran =

Savaran (Persian: سواران) may refer to:

== Geography ==
- Savaran, Isfahan
- Savaran, South Khorasan
- Kani Savaran, Kurdistan Province
- Pir Savaran, Hamadan Province
- Kuh-e Haft Savaran, Ostan-e Lorestan, 33.57 N, 49.96 E
- Ziaratgah-e Shah Savaran, Sistan and Baluchestan Province, 30.06 N, 60.77 E
- Shahsavaran
- Kuh-e Shahsavaran 28.76 N 60.86 E

== Military ==
- Asvārān, also known as "Savārān", historical Persian military units.

== See also ==
- Shahsavar (disambiguation)
- Saravan (disambiguation)
- Savaari (disambiguation)
- Savara (disambiguation)
