= Angiolillo =

Angiolillo is an Italian given name and surname. Notable people with the name include:

- Angiolillo Arcuccio (fl. 1440–1492), Italian painter
- Dominick Angiolillo, Italian cardiologist
- Luciana Angiolillo (1925–2014), Italian actress
- Michele Angiolillo (1871–1897), Italian anarchist

== See also ==
- Angelillo, surname
