= Sawaran =

Sawaran may refer to:

- Savaran (disambiguation), places in Iran
- Sawran, Syria
- Sawran (Kazakhstan)
