= Savaria =

Savaria may refer to:

- Savaria, Pannonia, the Roman city that is today Szombathely, Hungary
- 64974 Savaria, a minor planet
- Adolphe-François Savaria (1848–1929), Canadian politician
- Georges Savaria (1916–1998), Canadian pianist and composer
- Savaria (clan), a social group in Gujarat
- Sabariya, a Dravidian clan of Chhattisgarh

== See also ==
- Sabaria (disambiguation)
- Savaari (disambiguation)
- Saawariya, a 2007 Bollywood film by Sanjay Leela Bhansali
