= Sheshraj Harbansh =

Indian politician

Member of the Legislative Assembly, Chhattisgarh Vidhan Sabha
- Incumbent
- Assumed office 3 December 2023
- Preceded by: Indu Banjare
- Constituency: Pamgarh (SC)

Personal details
- Born: 10 December 1975 (age 50)
- Party: Indian National Congress (INC)

Sheshraj Harbansh (also spelled Harbans or Harvans) (born 1975) is an Indian politician from Chhattisgarh. She is an MLA from Pamgarh Assembly constituency, which is reserved for Scheduled Caste community, in Janjgir Champa district. She won the 2023 Chhattisgarh Legislative Assembly election, representing the Indian National Congress.

== Early life and education ==
Harbansh is from Pamgarh, Jangir Champa district, Chhattisgarh. She is the wife of Late Shri Rajkishor Singh Harbansh, an employee with Pradhan Mantri Gram Sadak Yojana. She completed her graduation in arts in 2006 at a college which is affiliated with Surguja University.

== Career ==
Harbansh won from Pamgarh Assembly constituency, representing the Indian National Congress, in the 2023 Chhattisgarh Legislative Assembly election. She polled 63,963 votes and defeated her nearest rival, Santosh Lahre of the Bharatiya Janata Party, by a margin of 16,194 votes.
