= Aversa Cathedral =

Cathedral in Aversa, Italy

Coordinates: 40°58′35″N 14°12′10″E

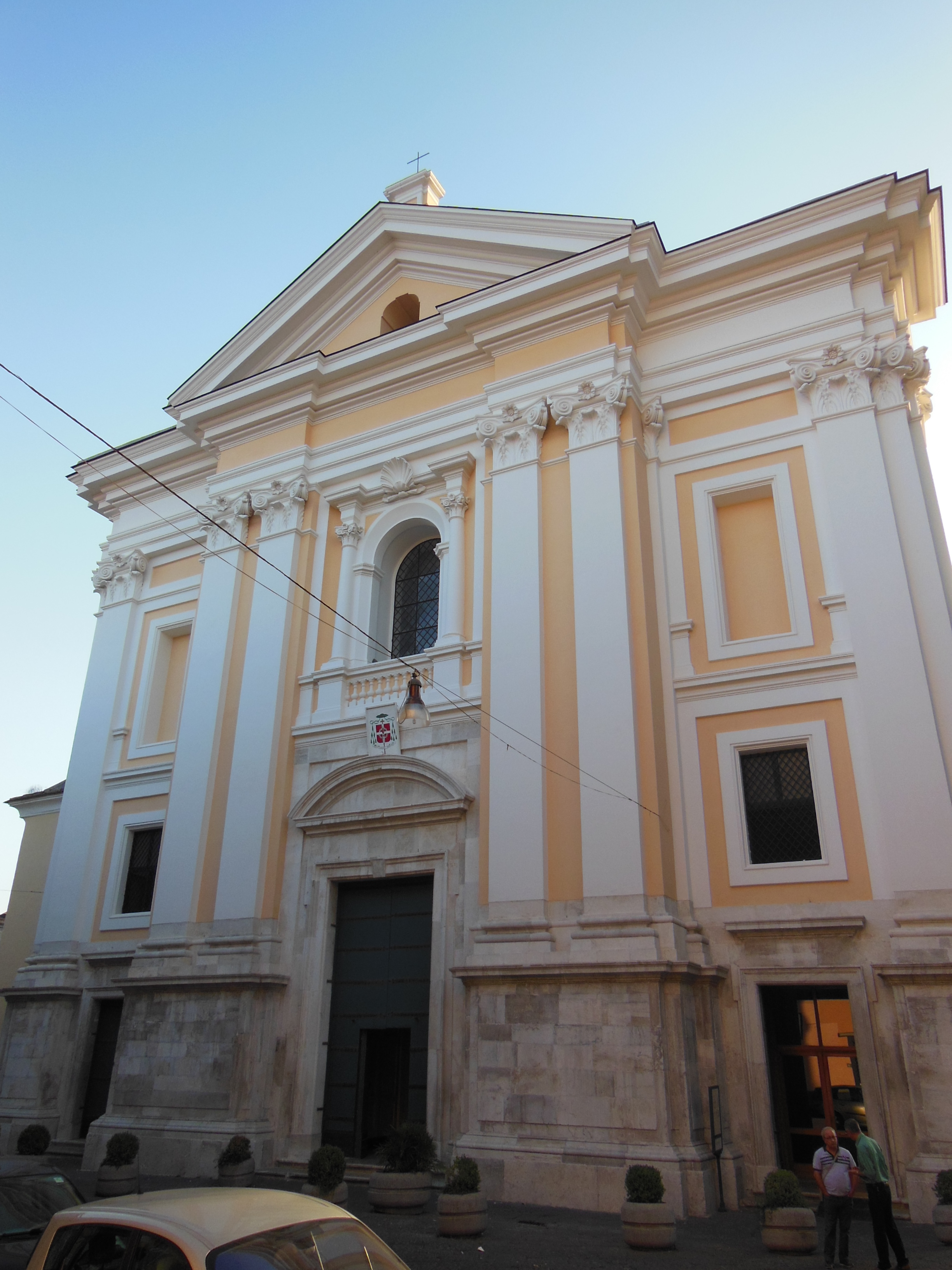
Aversa Cathedral

Aversa Cathedral (Italian: Duomo di Aversa, Cattedrale di San Paolo) is a Roman Catholic cathedral in the city of Aversa in the province of Caserta, Campania, Italy.

== History ==
It has been the seat of the Bishop of Aversa from the bishopric's foundation in 1053, under the Norman rule.

The Romanesque cathedral, dedicated to Saint Paul, has a spectacular ambulatory and an octagonal dome. Francesco Solimena's Madonna of the Gonfalone is kept here; the Martyrdom of Saint Sebastian by the Quattrocento painter Angiolillo Arcuccio, now in the seminary, was here formerly. The pre-Romanesque sculpture of Saint George and the Dragon is one of the few surviving free-standing sculptures of its date. An outstanding collection of Baroque liturgical silver is kept in the treasury.

== Sources ==
- Italian dioceses
- Catholic Hierarchy: Diocese of Aversa
- Catholic Encyclopedia: Diocese of Aversa
