= Angelillo (surname) =

Angelillo is an Italian surname. Notable people with the surname include:

- Antonio Angelillo (1937–2018), Argentine footballer
- Edi Angelillo (born 1961), Italian actress and singer
- Gigi Angelillo (1939–2015), Italian actor, voice actor and theatre director

== See also ==
- Angelillo, Spanish singer
- Angiolillo, surname
