= Pamgarh Assembly constituency =

Legislative Assembly constituency in Chhattisgarh State, India

Coordinates: 21.87°N 82.45°E

Pamgarh
- Constituency No. 38 for the Chhattisgarh Legislative Assembly

Constituency details
- Country: India
- Region: Central India
- State: Chhattisgarh
- District: Janjgir-Champa
- Lok Sabha constituency: Janjgir-Champa
- Established: 2008
- Total electors: 220,500
- Reservation: SC

Member of Legislative Assembly
- 6th Chhattisgarh Legislative Assembly
- Incumbent Sheshraj Harbansh
- Party: Indian National Congress
- Elected year: 2023

Pamgarh is one of the 90 Legislative Assembly constituencies of Chhattisgarh state in India.

It comprises Pamgarh tehsil and parts of Nawagarh tehsil, in Janjgir-Champa district and is reserved for candidates belonging to the Scheduled Castes.

== Members of the Legislative Assembly ==
Election	Name	Party
Prior to 2008: Constituency did not exist
2008	Dujram Bouddh	Bahujan Samaj Party
2013	Ambesh Jangre	Bharatiya Janata Party
2018	Indu Banjare	Bahujan Samaj Party
2023	Sheshraj Harbansh	Indian National Congress

== Election results ==
=== 2023 ===
Chhattisgarh Legislative Assembly Election, 2023: Bilaspur
Party	Candidate	Votes	%	±%
INC	Sheshraj Harvansh	63,963	42.80	+8.69
BJP	Santosh Kumar Lahare	47,789	31.98	+8.30
BSP	Indu Banjare	29,259	19.58	−16.74
JCC	Gorelal Barman	3,189	2.13	
AAP	Ujwala Karade	1,352	0.90	+0.53
NOTA	None of the Above	1,192	0.80	−0.27
Majority		16,174	10.82	+8.61
Turnout		149,447	67.78	−3.02
INC gain from BSP		Swing		

=== 2018 ===
Chhattisgarh Legislative Assembly Election, 2018: Pamgarh
Party	Candidate	Votes	%	±%
BSP	Indu Banjare	50,129	36.32	
INC	Gorelal Barman	47,068	34.11	
BJP	Ambesh Jangre	32,676	23.68	
NOTA	None of the Above	1,470	1.07	
Majority		3,061	2.21	
Turnout		138,004	70.80	
BSP gain from BJP		Swing		

== See also ==
- List of constituencies of the Chhattisgarh Legislative Assembly
- Janjgir-Champa district
