= Achrosis serpentinaria =

Scientific classification
- Kingdom: Animalia
- Phylum: Arthropoda
- Clade: Pancrustacea
- Class: Insecta
- Order: Lepidoptera
- Family: Geometridae
- Subfamily: Ennominae
- Genus: Achrosis
- Species: A. serpentinaria

Binomial name
- Achrosis serpentinaria (Walker, 1866)

Synonyms
- Sabaria serpentinaria Walker, 1866

Species of moth

Achrosis serpentinaria is a moth of the family Geometridae first described by Francis Walker in 1866. It is found in India and Sri Lanka.
