= Casaluce =

- Comune
- Comune di Casaluce
- Location within Italy Location within Campania
- Coordinates: 41°0′N 14°12′E
- Country: Italy
- Region: Campania
- Province: Caserta (CE)

Government
  - Mayor: Nazzaro Pagano

Area
  - Total: 9.4 km^{2} (3.6 sq mi)
- Elevation: 68 m (223 ft)

Population (31 December 2010)
  - Total: 10,283
  - Density: 1,100/km^{2} (2,800/sq mi)
- Demonym: Casalucesi
- Time zone: UTC+1 (CET)
  - Summer (DST): UTC+2 (CEST)
- Postal code: 81030
- Dialing code: 081
- Website: Official website

Casaluce (Homelight in English, Domus Lux in Latin) is a comune (municipality) in the Province of Caserta in the Italian region Campania, located about 20 kilometres (12 mi) north of Naples and about 13 kilometres (8 mi) southwest of Caserta.

Casaluce borders the following municipalities: Aversa, Frignano, San Tammaro, Santa Maria Capua Vetere, Teverola.

== History ==
Most likely Casaluce originated on the ruins of late Roman imperial ruins, a village being mentioned in the Cronaca Volturnese of 964 AD. In the early 11th century the first Normans immigrants had a base here. A castle was built by them in the place, in 1030 by Robert Guiscard, or 1060, by Rainulf Drengot, depending from the sources. The castle was destroyed by Roger II of Sicily after his victory against Drengot's successor, Richard II of Aversa. Roger later allowed a reconstruction of the structure, which was used as a military and tax-collection outpost under the Hohenstaufen dynasty, as a fief of the Casaluccia family. Later it was a possession of the del Balzo.

In 1360 the Celestine monks acquired the castle, adding a Gothic church annexed to it which became a centre of veneration of an image of the Virgin.
