= Royal Palace of Carditello =

18th-century palace in Caserta, Italy

- Reale tenuta di Carditello
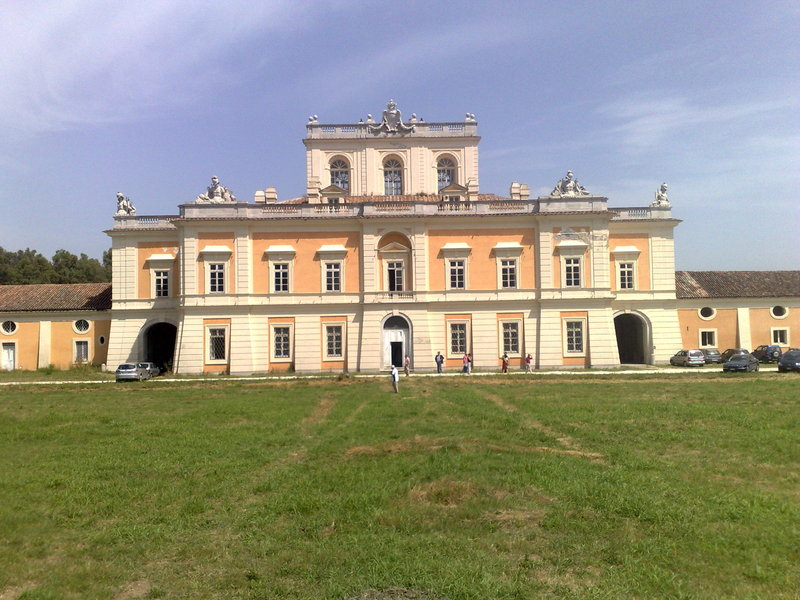
- The façade of the palace.
- Interactive map of the Royal Palace of Carditello area
- Alternative names: Reggia di Carditello

General information
- Type: Palace
- Architectural style: Italian Baroque, Neo-Classical
- Location: San Tammaro Caserta, Italy
- Client: Charles III of Spain, Ferdinand I of the Two Sicilies

Technical details
- Floor count: 2

Design and construction
- Architects: Francesco Collecini, Luigi Vanvitelli

The Royal Estate of Carditello (also known as the Reggia di Carditello) is a small 18th-century palace that once belonged to the Neapolitan Bourbon monarchy. It is located in San Tammaro, a village in the Province of Caserta, in the Campania region of southern Italy.

== History ==
While the estate functioned as an agricultural and pastoral production center, and included large amounts of royal territory, the palace entertained members of the royal court as a hunting lodge. The palace was designed by Francesco Collecini (1723–1804), pupil of Vanvitelli. The forecourt had a large horse racing track.

The royal estate itself enchanted Johann Wolfgang von Goethe, who wrote that people should visit Carditello to understand what nature really was. Carditello offered the king and his court the opportunity for hunting excursions, its woods being rich in game.

Many years of disuse would follow after the unification of Italy. The king left the estate in the care of the local head of the Camorra, which began a long period of disinterest and neglect of the property. In 1920, 2,070 hectares of the estate were sold, leaving only the main palace building and 15 hectares surrounding it. During World War II, it was occupied by German and American troops, which increased the state of degradation of the palace, especially its frescoed interior. Over time, the palace was gradually stripped of its fixtures.

In January 2014, the palace was acquired by the Italian Ministry of Cultural Heritage.

The palace is featured in the 2015 film Lost and Beautiful, a tribute to Tommaso Cestrone, who singlehandedly volunteered to preserve the grounds despite intimidation and threats from the local Camorra.

== The palace ==
The palace was built in the second half of the 18th century by Charles of Bourbon. The complex is 300 meters long and divided into 3 parts: on two sides there are two wings that are divided by the main palace with two long halls. There are 3 buildings that are linked between them, because the royals wanted to demonstrate that there were no barriers separating the people and the royal family.

On the ground floor there are kitchens, weapons stocks, and the staff room. On the first floor there are two distinct areas, one for the royal family and the other for the receptions that were organized after hunting.

The small church is built in typical 18th-century style, decorated by the main artists of the court such as Jacob Philipp Hackert.
