= Savaari =

Savaari, Savari or Sawaari may refer to:

== Film ==
- Savari (2009 film), an Indian Kannada-language film
  - Savaari 2, 2014 sequel to the 2009 film
- Sawaari (2016 film), a 2016 Indian film
- Savari (2018 film), an Indian Malayalam-language film
- Savaari (2020 film), an Indian Telugu-language film

== Other uses ==
- Savari, Iran
- Savari, former Libyan cavalries
- Sawar, a cavalry rank in the Indian Army

== See also ==
- Savaria (disambiguation)
- Savaran (disambiguation)
- Savara (disambiguation)
