= Villa di Briano =

- Comune
- Comune di Villa di Briano
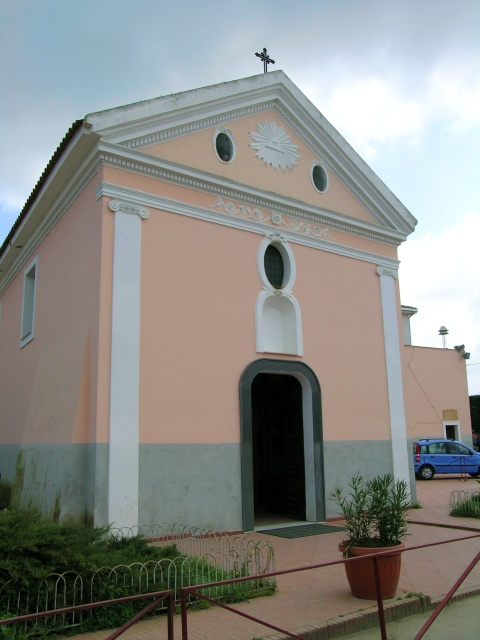
- Sanctuary of Madonna di Briano.

- Location within Italy Location within Campania
- Coordinates: 41°0′N 14°10′E
- Country: Italy
- Region: Campania
- Province: Caserta (CE)

Government
  - Mayor: Luigi Della Corte

Area
  - Total: 8.5 km^{2} (3.3 sq mi)
- Elevation: 68 m (223 ft)

Population (31 December 2015)
  - Total: 7,087
  - Density: 830/km^{2} (2,200/sq mi)
- Demonym: Brianesi
- Time zone: UTC+1 (CET)
  - Summer (DST): UTC+2 (CEST)
- Postal code: 81030
- Dialing code: 081
- Website: Official website

Villa di Briano is a comune (municipality) in the Province of Caserta in the Italian region Campania, located about 20 kilometres (12 mi) northwest of Naples and about 15 kilometres (9 mi) southwest of Caserta.

Villa di Briano borders the following municipalities: Casal di Principe, Casapesenna, Frignano, San Cipriano d'Aversa, San Marcellino, San Tammaro.

== History ==
In the past, the town was known by the name Frignano Minore (Piccolo), until it was renamed Villa Di Briano on 17 November 1950. This name comes from the Latin 'vallis' (valley) and from 'Ambriano' that became Mbriano and then Briano.

== Main sights ==
Villa di Briano is famous for the ancient church of Maria Santissima di Briano located in a large area of open land. Here, the Madonna di Briano is celebrated with an annual festival held on the Sunday after Easter. During this festivity believers come from all over the region. There are colourful floats, dances and famous folk songs. Furthermore, the day after Easter people have fun listening to the "vattienti", dancing frantically with them.
