= Gothic conquest of Galicia =

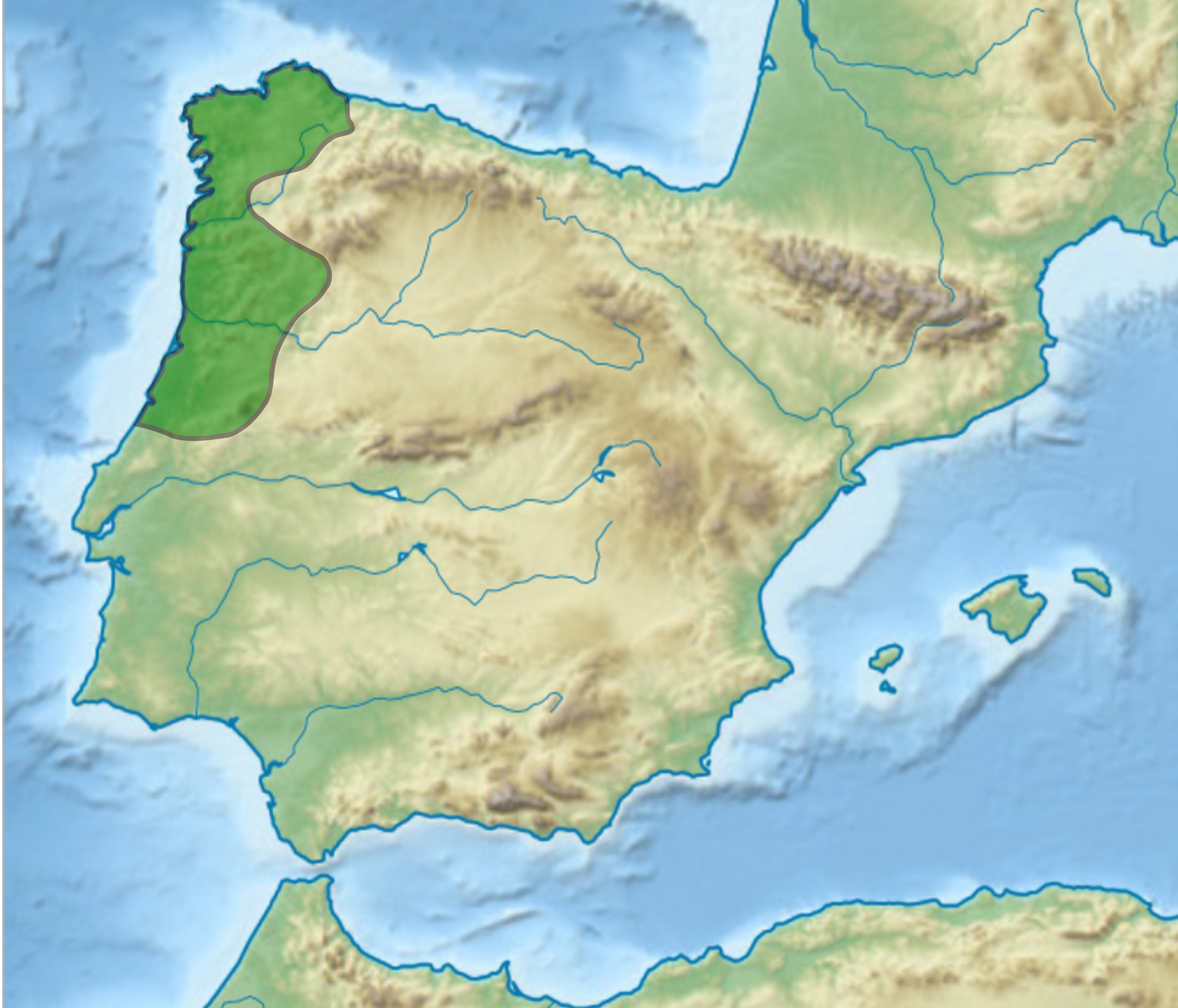
- Suebi Kingdom of Galicia c. 575-585 AD
Date	569-585
Location	Galicia
Result	Galicia annexed by the Visigothic Kingdom

Belligerents
Kingdom of the Suebi	Visigothic Kingdom

Commanders and leaders
Miro, Andeca, Malaric	Liuvigild

The Gothic conquest of Galicia was a prolonged military conflict between the Visigothic king Liuvigild and the Suebi Kingdom of Galicia, culminating in the latter's defeat and annexation in 585.

== Miro's defiance ==
The war began in 569 with Liuvigild's conquest of many cities in the eastern part of the Suebi realm including Palencia, Zamora, and Leon. Around the same time, the Suebi king Theodemir died and was succeeded by Miro.

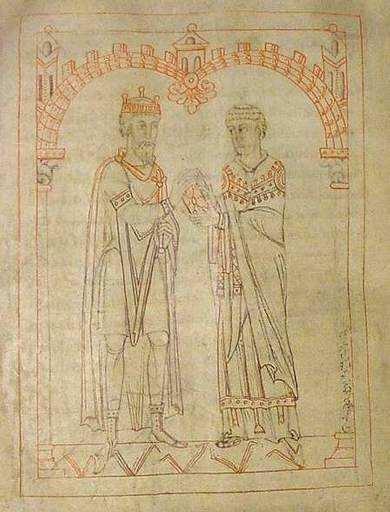
Medieval miniature from the year 1145 depicting Miro (left) and Martin of Braga (right)

To avenge this loss of territory, Miro invaded Cantabria and other adjacent lands. His efforts would prove to be futile, however, as Liuvigild recaptued Cantabria by 574 and took Saldana, Asturias. Additionally, he conquered the semi-autonomous border region of Sabaria, including the city of Salamanca from the Suebi in 573. Desperate, Miro attempted to contact the Frankish king Guntram for help, but the envoys were intercepted by Chilperic I of Neustria, an ally of Liuvigild. Liuvigild's attacks resumed in 575 when he conquered Ourense from the Suebi and captured its Hispano-Roman lord Aspidius, causing Miro to accept a peace treaty.

When prince Hermenegild revolted against Liuvigild in support of Nicene Christianity over his father's Arian faith, Miro sought to capitalize on Liuvigild's downfall and began marching to Hermenegild's aid in Seville. Before reaching the city, however, a conference held between the two kings caused Miro to return to Galicia. Back home, he contracted a sickness from the poor Baetican air and water, dying in 583. He was succeeded by his adolescent son Eboric.

== Final years ==
Eboric ruled uneventfully from 583-584.

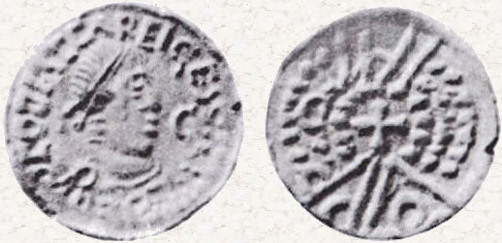
Tremissis of Andeca, lost during the Spanish Civil War

In 584, a man named Andeca usurped the kingship by banishing Eboric to a convent and marrying his mother, Siseguntia. Andeca's lack of legitimacy was excellent casus belli for Liuvigild to resume military operations in Galicia, which he did so promptly. In 585, Liuvigild deposed Andeca, relegated him to Beja, and annexed the Suebi Kingdom of Galicia as the kingdom's sixth province.

Although Andeca was the last official king, a pretender named Malaric briefly led a revolt in 585 claiming continuity of the Suebic kingship. Nonetheless, he was defeated by Liuvigild's generals the same year.
