= Carinaro =

- Comune
- Comune di Carinaro
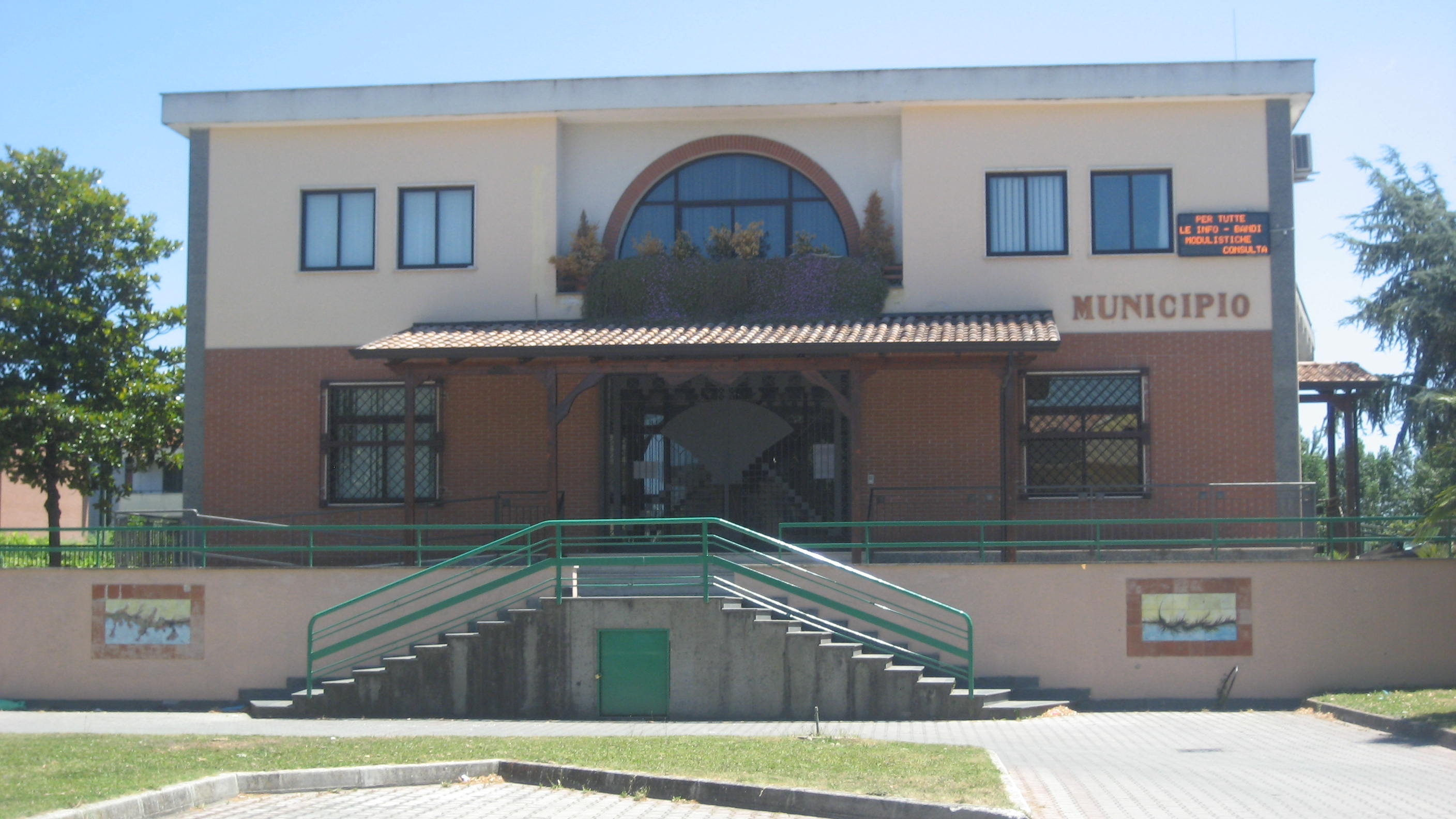
- Town hall

- Location within Italy Location within Campania
- Coordinates: 40°59′N 14°13′E
- Country: Italy
- Region: Campania
- Province: Caserta (CE)

Government
  - Mayor: Marianna Dell'Aprovitola

Area
  - Total: 6.3 km^{2} (2.4 sq mi)
- Elevation: 19 m (62 ft)

Population (31 August 2015)
  - Total: 7,134
  - Density: 1,100/km^{2} (2,900/sq mi)
- Demonym: Carinaresi
- Time zone: UTC+1 (CET)
  - Summer (DST): UTC+2 (CEST)
- Postal code: 81032
- Dialing code: 081

Carinaro is a comune (municipality) in the Province of Caserta in the Italian region Campania, located about 15 kilometres (9 mi) north of Naples and about 13 kilometres (8 mi) southwest of Caserta.

Carinaro borders the following municipalities: Aversa, Gricignano di Aversa, Marcianise, Santa Maria Capua Vetere, Teverola.
