= San Marcellino =

- Comune
- Comune di San Marcellino
- Location within Italy Location within Campania
- Coordinates: 40°59′N 14°11′E
- Country: Italy
- Region: Campania
- Province: Caserta (CE)

Government
  - Mayor: Anacleto Colombiano

Area
  - Total: 4.6 km^{2} (1.8 sq mi)
- Elevation: 68 m (223 ft)

Population (31 December 2010)
  - Total: 13,308
  - Density: 2,900/km^{2} (7,500/sq mi)
- Demonym: Sammarcellinesi
- Time zone: UTC+1 (CET)
  - Summer (DST): UTC+2 (CEST)
- Postal code: 81030
- Dialing code: 081
- Website: Official website

San Marcellino is a comune (municipality) in the Province of Caserta in the Italian region Campania, located about 20 kilometres (12 mi) northwest of Naples and about 15 kilometres (9 mi) southwest of Caserta.

San Marcellino borders the following municipalities: Aversa, Casapesenna, Frignano, Trentola-Ducenta, Villa di Briano.
