= Santa Maria la Fossa =

- Comune
- Comune di Santa Maria la Fossa
- Location within Italy Location within Campania
- Coordinates: 41°6′N 14°8′E
- Country: Italy
- Region: Campania
- Province: Caserta (CE)

Government
  - Mayor: Nicolino Federico

Area
  - Total: 29.74 km^{2} (11.48 sq mi)
- Elevation: 16 m (52 ft)

Population (31 December 2015)
  - Total: 2,729
  - Density: 91.76/km^{2} (237.7/sq mi)
- Demonym: Fossatari
- Time zone: UTC+1 (CET)
  - Summer (DST): UTC+2 (CEST)
- Postal code: 81050
- Dialing code: 0823
- Website: Official website

Santa Maria la Fossa is a comune (municipality) in the Province of Caserta in the Italian region Campania, located about 30 kilometres (19 mi) northwest of Naples and about 15 kilometres (9 mi) west of Caserta.

Santa Maria la Fossa borders the following municipalities: Capua, Casal di Principe, Grazzanise, San Tammaro.

== People ==
Footballer Attilio Lombardo was born in Santa Maria la Fossa.
