= Gothic War =

Gothic War may refer to:

- Gothic War (248–253), battles and plundering carried out by the Goths and their allies in the Roman Empire.
- Gothic War (367–369), a war of Thervingi against the Eastern Roman Empire in which the Goths retreated to Montes Serrorum
- Gothic War (376–382), Thervingi and Greuthungi against the Roman Empire
- Gothic War (395-398), a war of Visigotische against the Roman Empire
- 399-400 Gothic Revolt of Tribigild, a war in Anatolia of Goths against the Eastern Empire
- Gothic War (401-403), a war of Visigoths against the Western Roman Empire that included the Battle of Pollentia
- Gothic War in Spain (416-418), a war of Visigoths against several barbarian people on behalf of the West Roman Empire
- Gothic revolt of Theodoric I, a war in Aquitaine of Goths against the Western Empire
- Gothic War (436-439), a war Visigoths against the Western Roman Empire that included the Battle of Mons Colubrarius
- Gothic War in Spain (456) a war of Visigoths against the Seubi on behalf of the West Roman Empire
- Gothic War (457-458), a war Visigoths against the Western Roman Empire
- Gothic War (535–554), Ostrogoths against the Eastern Roman Empire
- Gothic conquest of Galicia (569-585), Visigoths against the Suebi Kingdom

== See also ==
- Gothic and Vandal warfare
- Gothic Wars
