= List of presidents of the Province of Caserta =

President of the Province of Caserta
- Presidente della Provincia di Caserta

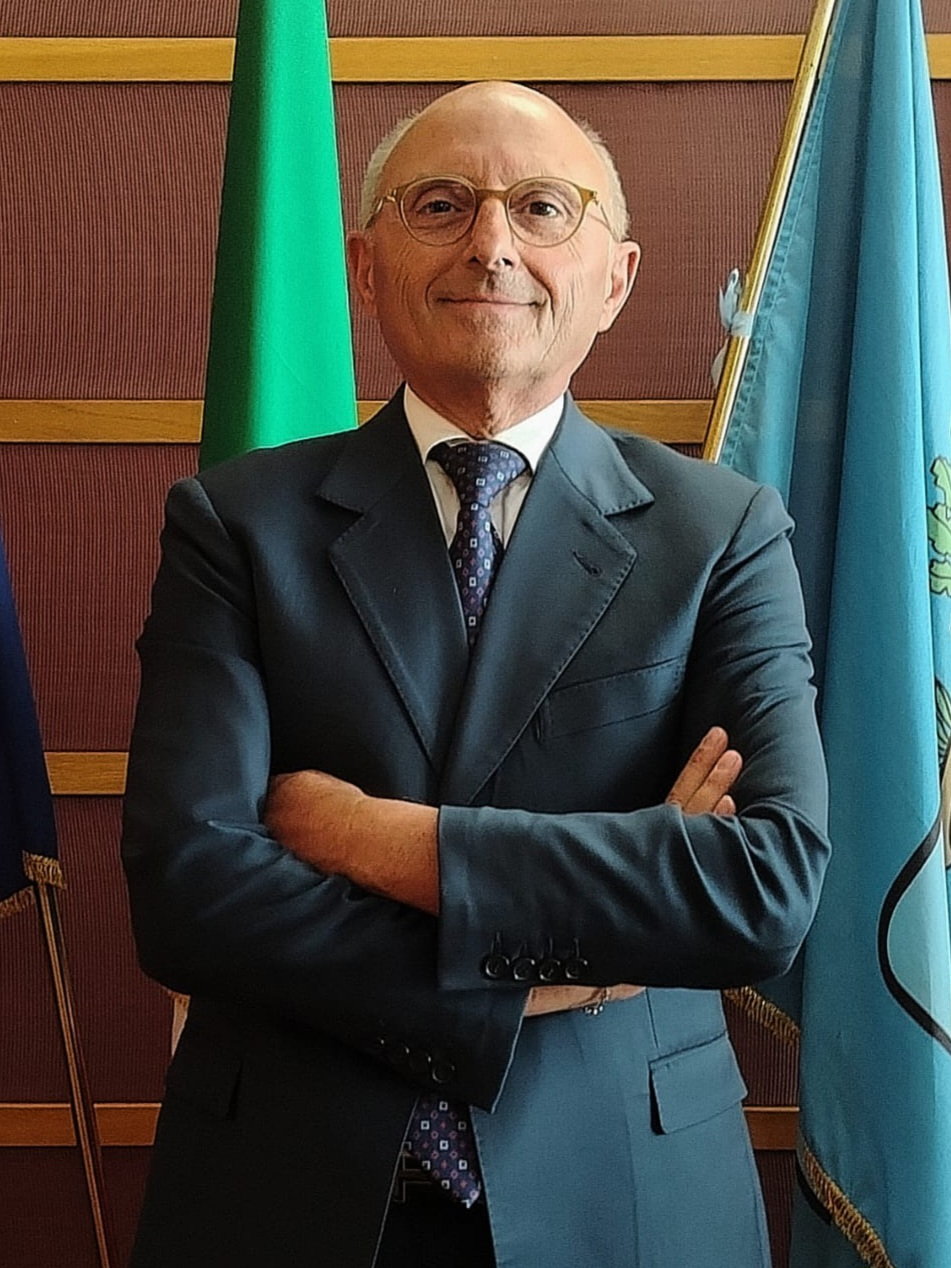
- Incumbent; Anacleto Colombiano since 30 June 2025
- Term length: 4 years
- Inaugural holder: Clemente Piscitelli
- Formation: 1946

The president of the Province of Caserta is the head of the provincial government in Caserta, Campania, Italy. The president oversees the administration of the province, coordinates the activities of the municipalities, and represents the province in regional and national matters.

Since June 2025, the office has been held by Anacleto Colombiano of Forza Italia.

== History ==
The Province of Caserta was established in 1945, following the reconstitution of the provincial administration after World War II. It inherited most of the territory of the former Province of Terra di Lavoro, which had been abolished in 1927 during the Fascist administrative reorganization.

During the transition period, the new provincial administration was initially managed by two special commissioners, Tito Ingarrica and Federico D'Aiuto. The latter was subsequently appointed prefectural commissioner. On 29 August 1946, a Provincial Deputation (Deputazione provinciale) was then established, headed by Clemente Piscitelli, to oversee the administration of the province until the restoration of elected institutions.

The first provincial elections were held in 1952, leading to the first formation of the Provincial Council of Caserta on 25 May 1952, which was presided over by Fortunato Messa. Initially elected by the council, the president was chosen directly by the citizens of the province from 1996 to 2015.

Following the 2014 Delrio reform, presidents are elected by the Assembly of the mayors and municipal councillors of the province's municipalities. The term of office was reduced from five to four years.

== List ==
=== Presidents of the Provincial Deputation (1946–1952) ===
No.	Portrait	Name	Term		Party
No.	Portrait	Name	Start	End	Party
1		Clemente Piscitelli	29 August 1946	2 March 1948	Christian Democracy
2		Antonio Marconi	2 March 1948	10 May 1948	Independent
(1)		Clemente Piscitelli	10 May 1948	13 March 1950	Christian Democracy
3		Gennaro D'Andria	13 March 1950	16 June 1952	Independent

=== Presidents of the Province (1952–present) ===
No.	Portrait	Name	Term		Party
No.	Portrait	Name	Start	End	Party
1		Fortunato Messa	1952	1954	Christian Democracy
2		Mario Sementini	1954	1956	Christian Democracy
3		Luigi Falco	1956	1964	Christian Democracy
4		Raffaele Cervo	1966	1967	Christian Democracy
5		Manfredi Bosco	1967	1968	Christian Democracy
6		Vincenzo De Michele	1968	1969	Christian Democracy
7		Dante Cappello	1969	1975	Christian Democracy
8		Renato Coppola	1975	?	Christian Democracy
		Giuseppe Buco	?	1984	Christian Democracy
		Alessandro Troianiello	1984	1985	Christian Democracy
		Pasquale D'Albore	1985	10 November 1989	Italian Socialist Party
		Gianpaolo Iaselli	10 November 1989	10 August 1990	Christian Democracy
		Angelo Antonio Pascariello	22 August 1990	6 November 1990	Christian Democracy
		Giuseppe Urbano	6 November 1990	25 June 1991	Prefectural commissioner
		Angelo Antonio Pascariello	25 June 1991	16 March 1993	Christian Democracy
		Raffaele Raucci	15 May 1993	14 February 1994	Italian Socialist Party
		Pietro Squeglia	14 February 1994	7 July 1995	Christian Democracy
		Francesco Domenico Cipolla	5 September 1995	24 June 1996	Italian People's Party
		Riccardo Ventre	24 June 1996	1 May 2000	Forza Italia
		Riccardo Ventre	1 May 2000	5 April 2005	Forza Italia
		Sandro De Franciscis	5 April 2005	4 March 2009	Democratic Party
		Biagio Giliberti	25 March 2009	30 March 2010	Special commissioner
		Domenico Zinzi	30 March 2010	14 May 2015	Union of the Centre
		Angelo Di Costanzo	14 May 2015	13 September 2016	Independent (centre-right)
–		Silvio Lavornia (acting)	13 September 2016	16 October 2017	Forza Italia
		Giorgio Magliocca	16 October 2017	19 December 2021	Forza Italia
		Giorgio Magliocca	19 December 2021	15 November 2024	Forza Italia
–		Gaetano Di Monaco (acting)	15 November 2024	28 November 2024	Independent (centre-right)
–		Marcello De Rosa (acting)	28 November 2024	30 June 2025	Independent (centre-left)
		Anacleto Colombiano	30 June 2025	incumbent	Forza Italia

== Sources ==
- "Storia amministrativa dell'ente". Ministero dell'Interno.
- Corsi, Ermanno (2005). Terra di lavoro e di progresso. La provincia di Caserta nel terzo millennio (in Italian). Napoli: Guida.
- Giordano, Anna; Caprio, Adriana; Natale, Marcello (2003). Terra di Lavoro (in Italian). Napoli: Guida. p. 44.
- Menichini, Piera (2005). "I presidenti delle Province dall'Unità alla Grande guerra: repertorio analitico". Storia Amministrazione Costituzione (in Italian) (13): 239–240.
