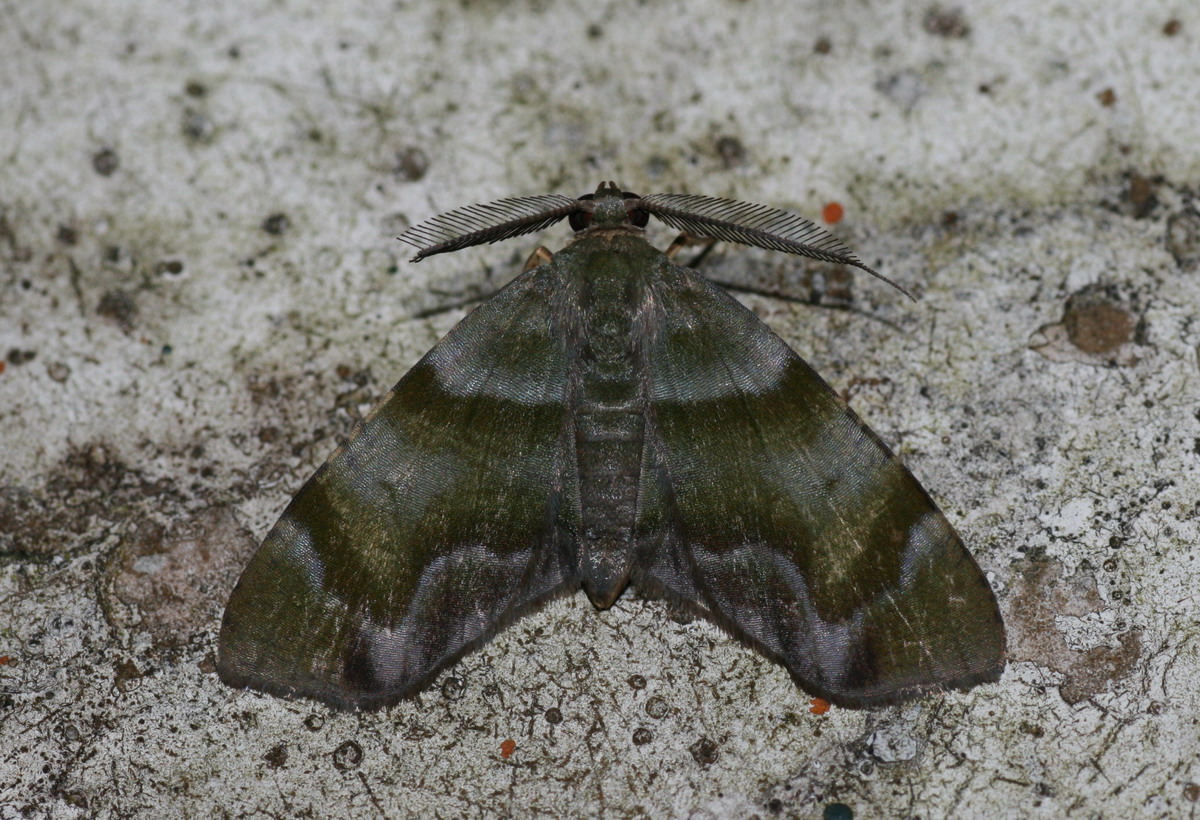

Scientific classification
- Kingdom: Animalia
- Phylum: Arthropoda
- Class: Insecta
- Order: Lepidoptera
- Family: Geometridae
- Subfamily: Ennominae
- Genus: Achrosis
- Species: A. incitata

Binomial name
- Achrosis incitata (Walker, 1862)

Synonyms
- Omiza incitata Walker, 1862

= Achrosis incitata =

Species of moth

Achrosis incitata is a species of moth of the family Geometridae first described by Francis Walker in 1862. It is found in Asia, including the Himalayas, Darjeeling and Hong Kong.

The larvae feed on Ixora species.
