= Anacleto Colombiano =

Italian politician (born 1961)

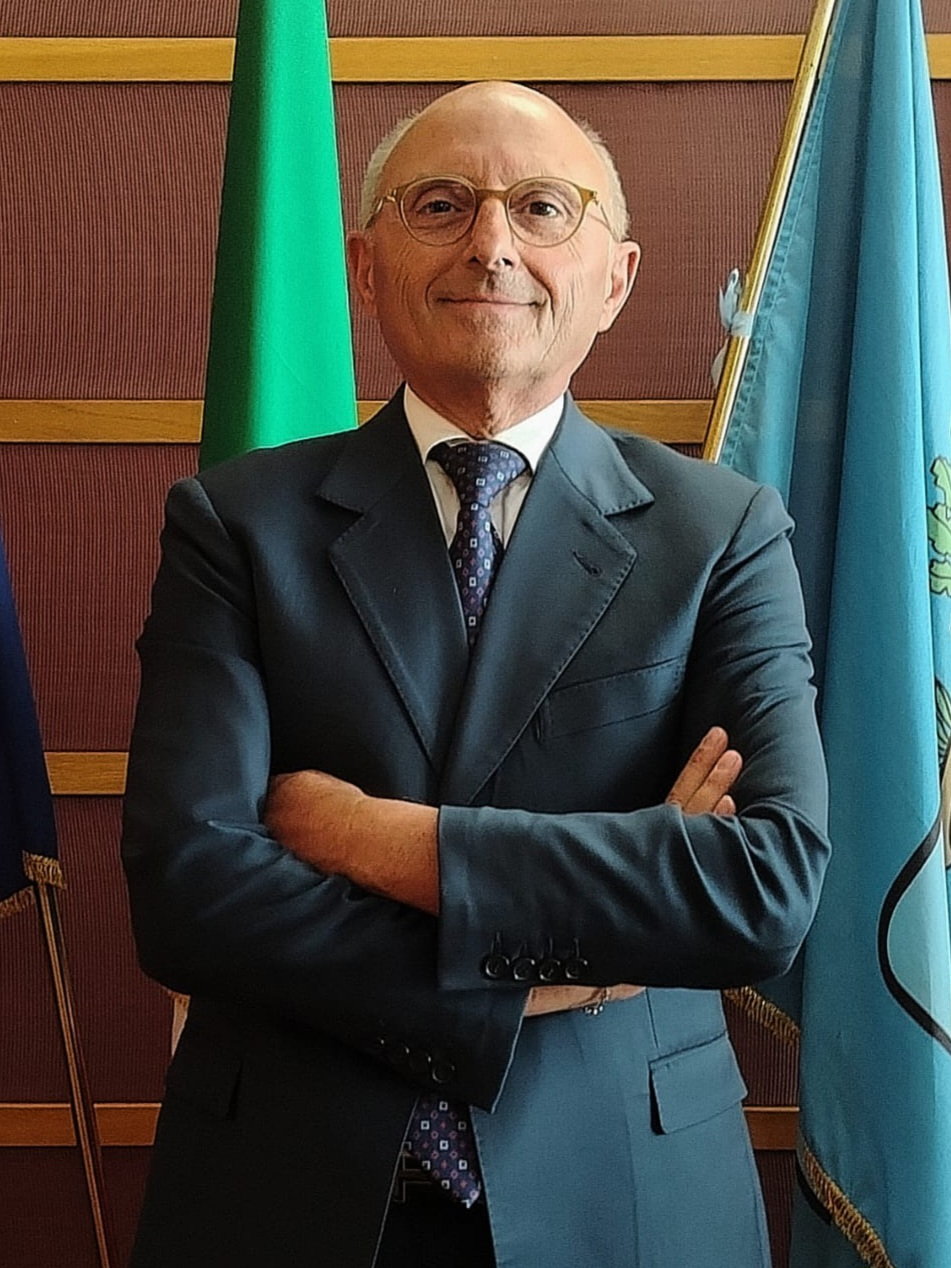
- Colombiano in 2025

President of the Province of Caserta
- Incumbent
- Assumed office 30 June 2025
- Preceded by: Giorgio Magliocca

Mayor of San Marcellino
- Incumbent
- Assumed office 6 June 2016
- Preceded by: Pasquale Carbone

Personal details
- Born: 2 October 1961 (age 64) Naples, Italy
- Party: Forza Italia
- Occupation: Entrepreneur

Anacleto Colombiano (born 2 October 1961) is an Italian politician serving as president of the Province of Caserta since 2025. He has also served as mayor of San Marcellino since 2016.

== Career ==
Colombiano began his political career in the municipal administration of San Marcellino, where he served as a municipal councillor from 1997. He subsequently served as assessor for public affairs from 1999 to 2006 and as deputy mayor from 2003 to 2006. He was elected mayor of San Marcellino in the 2016 Italian local elections and re-elected in 2021.

In the 2025 election for president of the Province of Caserta, Colombiano was supported by a coalition including Forza Italia, Us Moderates and a faction of Brothers of Italy. He won the election with 54.67% of the weighted vote, defeating candidates Antonio Mirra and Angelo Di Costanzo.
