= Aragonese Castle (Aversa) =

Building in Aversa, Italy

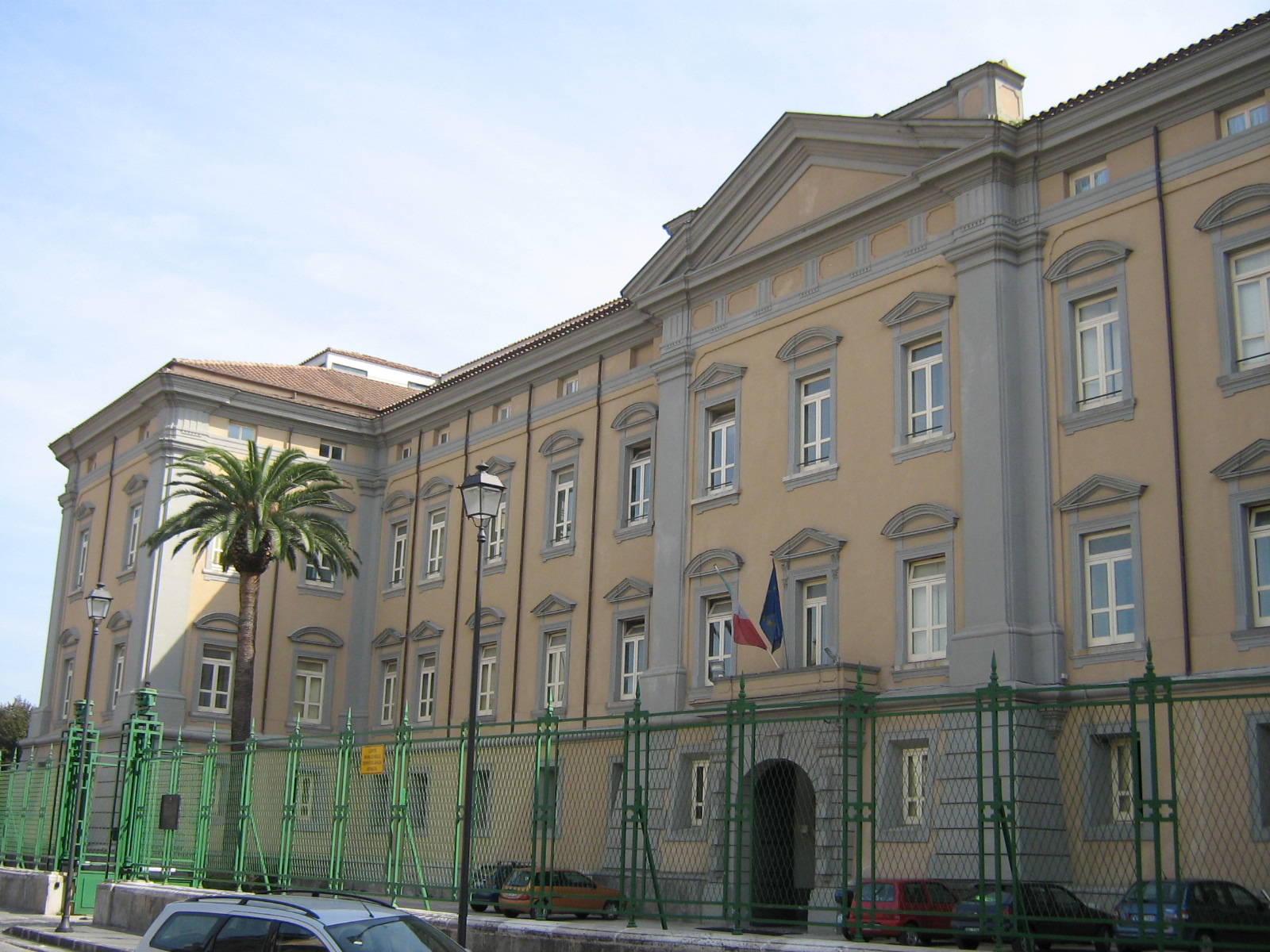
- Interactive map of the Aragonese Castle area

General information
- Location: Aversa, Province of Caserta, Campania, Italy
- Coordinates: 40°58′44.7″N 14°12′14.8″E
- Construction started: 12th century
- Completed: 1492
- Renovated: 1750

The Aragonese Castle (Castello Aragonese) is a former castle turned into a courthouse located on Piazza Trieste e Trento in Aversa, Italy. It houses the Court of North Naples ("Napoli Nord").

== History ==
The Castle of Aversa, built in the 12th century at the behest of Roger II, was located near the church of Santa Maria a Piazza and featured a square plan with crenellated towers at the corners, developing over four levels plus a basement. During the Swabian period, Frederick II made significant modifications, including the inner portico and rebuilding of the towers.

Over the centuries, it was the residence of historical figures such as Joanna I of Anjou and Muzio Attendolo Sforza, and it suffered damage and renovations, including the one in 1492 commissioned by Alfonso of Aragon, from which the name "Aragonese Castle" derives.

In the 18th century, the castle fell into neglect until it was restored by Luigi Vanvitelli in 1750, who profoundly modified its structure, covering the moat and adding new levels. By the late 19th century, it deteriorated again, but in 1931 it was restored thanks to Filippo Saporito and transformed into a judicial prison, becoming a center for forensic psychiatry, famous for the case of Leonarda Cianciulli.

Subsequently, the castle housed the Penitentiary Police School, and since 2013, it has been the seat of the Court and the judicial offices of North Naples.
