= Frignano =

- Comune
- Comune di Frignano
- Location within Italy Location within Campania
- Coordinates: 41°0′N 14°11′E
- Country: Italy
- Region: Campania
- Province: Caserta (CE)

Government
  - Mayor: Lucio Santarpia

Area
  - Total: 9.9 km^{2} (3.8 sq mi)
- Elevation: 68 m (223 ft)

Population (31 August 2017)
  - Total: 9,105
  - Density: 920/km^{2} (2,400/sq mi)
- Demonym: Frignanesi
- Time zone: UTC+1 (CET)
  - Summer (DST): UTC+2 (CEST)
- Postal code: 81030
- Dialing code: 081
- Patron saint: Saints Nazarius and Celsus
- Saint day: 28 July
- Website: Official website

Frignano is a comune (municipality) in the Province of Caserta in the Italian region Campania, located about 20 kilometres (12 mi) northwest of Naples and about 15 kilometres (9 mi) southwest of Caserta.

Frignano borders the following municipalities: Aversa, Casaluce, San Marcellino, San Tammaro, Villa di Briano.
