= Domenico Zinzi =

Italian politician (born 1943)

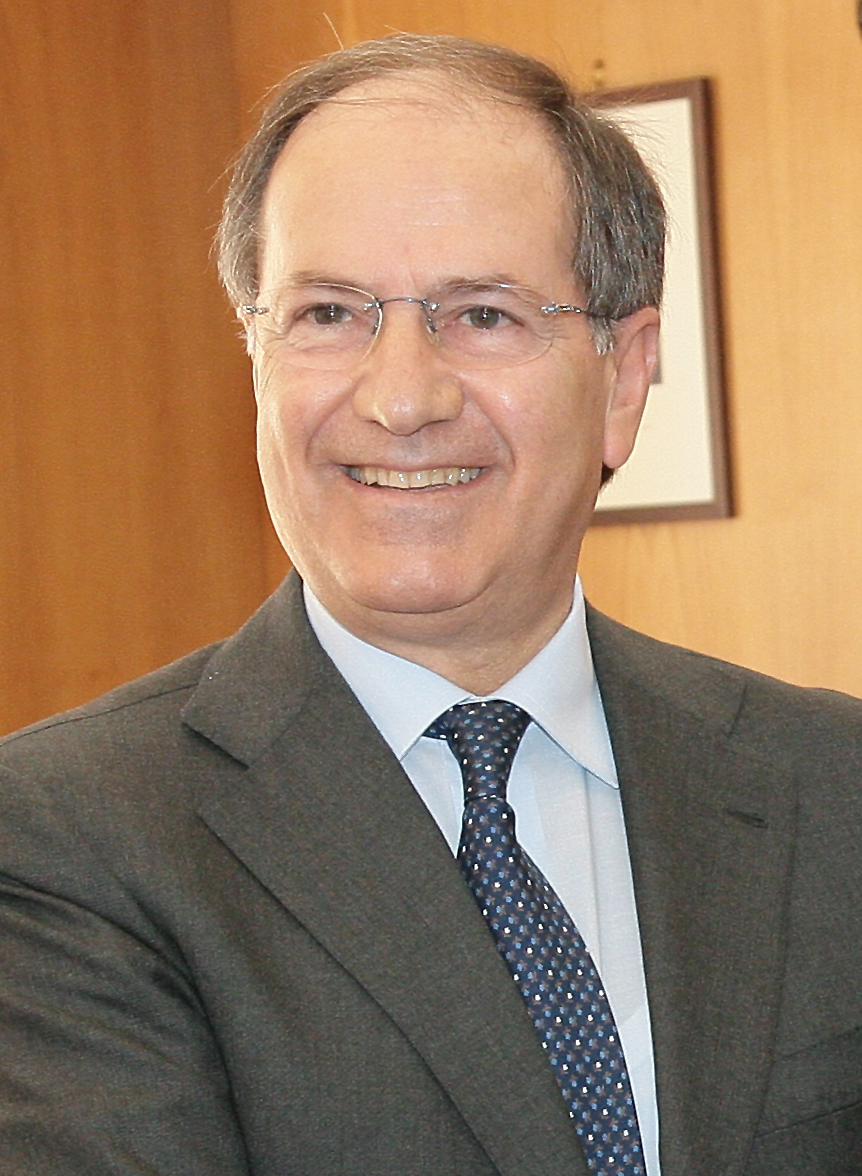

Member of the Senate of the Republic of Italy
- In office 2001–2006

President of the Province of Caserta
- In office 30 March 2010 – 14 May 2015
- Preceded by: Sandro De Franciscis
- Succeeded by: Angelo Di Costanzo

Personal details
- Born: July 23, 1943 (age 82) Marcianise, Province of Caserta, Italy
- Occupation: Politician

Domenico Zinzi (born July 23, 1943) is an Italian politician. He served as a member of the Italian Senate from 2001 to 2006 and as president of the Province of Caserta from 2010 to 2015.
