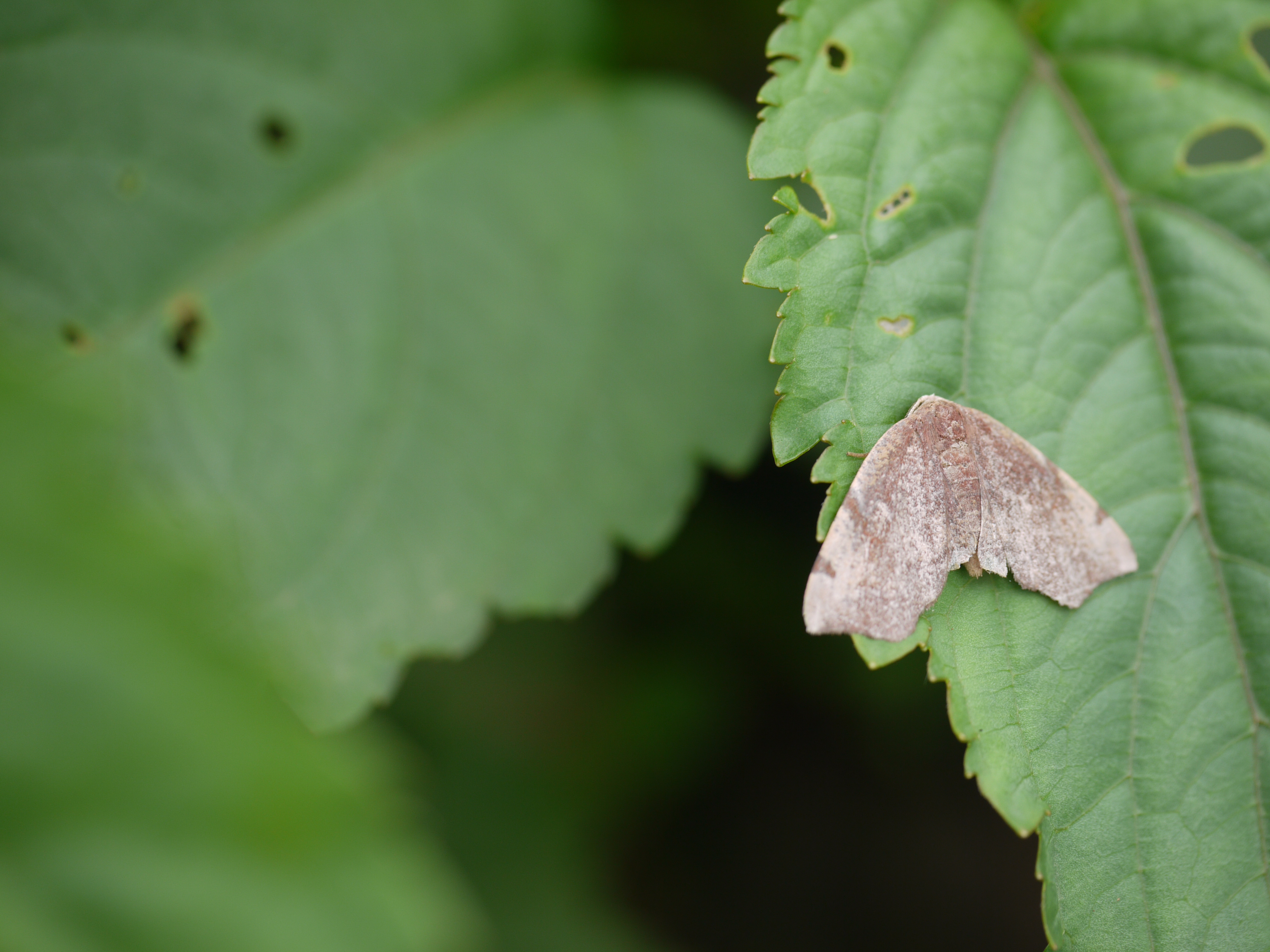
- Adult in Thane, India
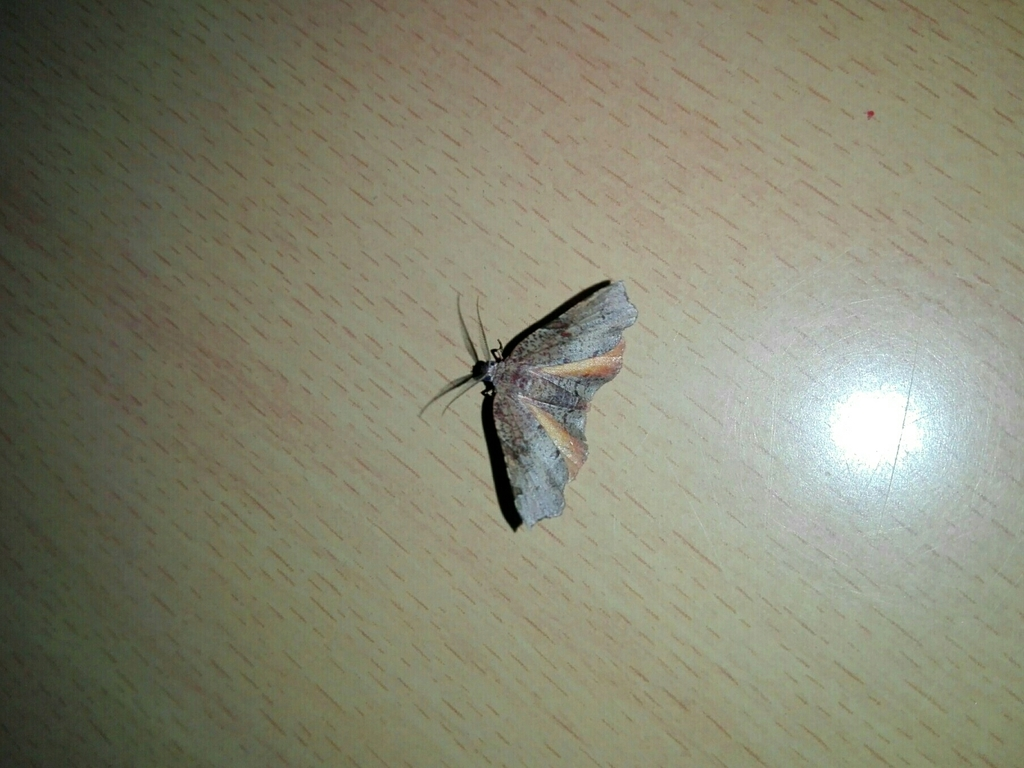
- Adult with open wings in Trincomalee, Sri Lanka

Scientific classification
- Kingdom: Animalia
- Phylum: Arthropoda
- Clade: Pancrustacea
- Class: Insecta
- Order: Lepidoptera
- Family: Geometridae
- Subfamily: Ennominae
- Genus: Achrosis
- Species: A. rondelaria

Binomial name
- Achrosis rondelaria (Fabricius, 1775)

Synonyms
- Sabaria rondelaria Fabricius, 1775; Phalaena rondelaria Fabricius, 1775; Sabaria contractaria Walker, 1860; Osicerda alienata Walker, 1862; Celesdera schistifusata Walker, [1863]; Isnisca cyclogonata Walker, [1863]

= Achrosis rondelaria =

Species of moth

Achrosis rondelaria is a moth of the family Geometridae first described by Johan Christian Fabricius in 1775. It is found in India, Sri Lanka, Myanmar, Java and Nepal.

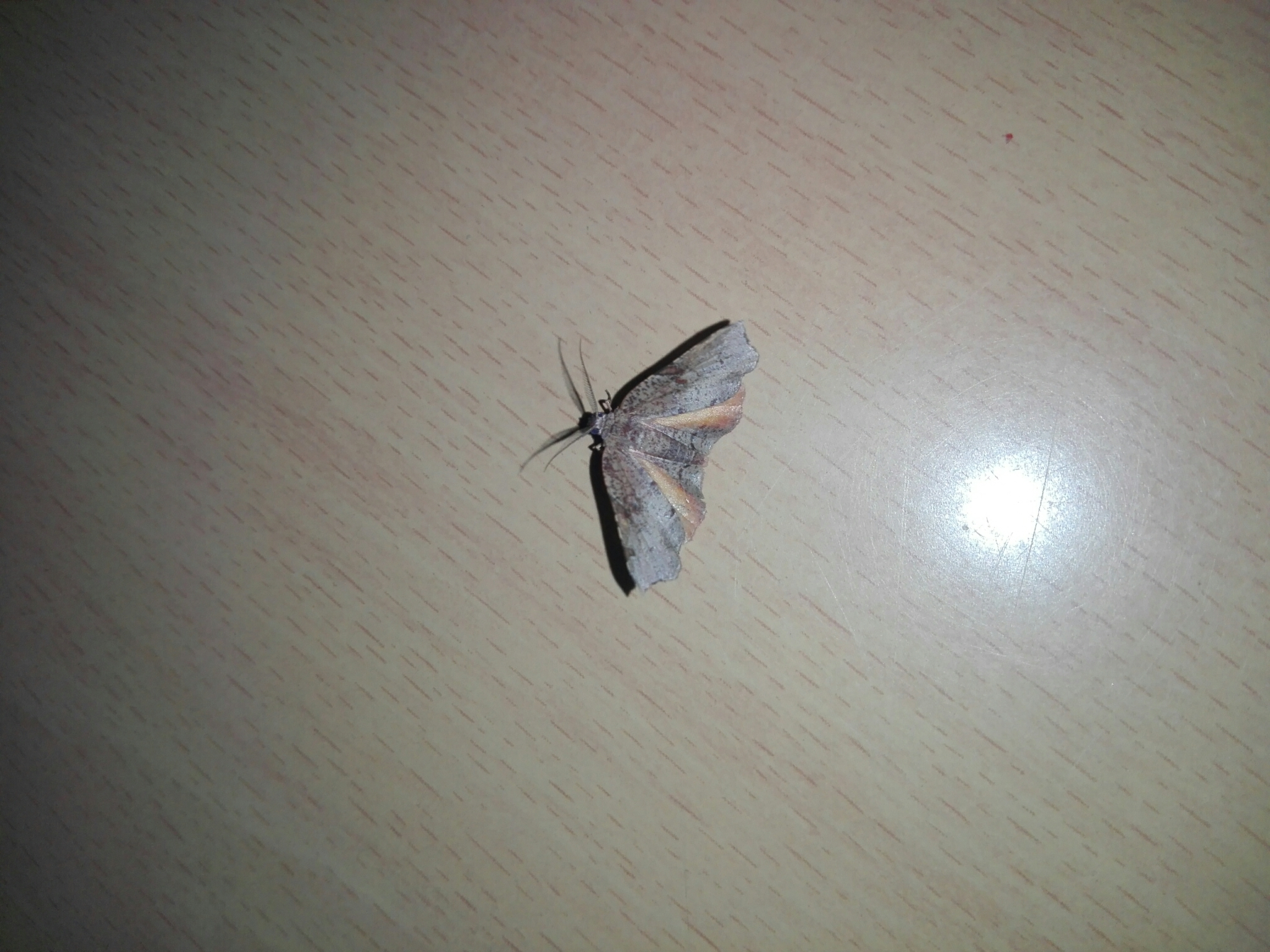
Adult with open wings in Trincomalee, Sri Lanka

The wingspan of the male is 22 mm. Palpi are slender and do not reach beyond the frons. Antennae bipectinate (comb like on both sides) in both sexes to near apex, and branches longer in the male than in the female. Head, thorax, abdomen and forewings are reddish brown with a greyish suffusion. Forewing produced at apex. Hindwings with the reddish-brown costal half and the inner half crossed by a postmedial line. Underside of wings orange red.
