= Savara =

Savara may refer to:

- Savara people or Sora people
- Savara language (Munda), or Sora, in India
- Savara language (Dravidian), in India
- Savara (moth), a genus of moths in the family Erebidae
- Savara, a planet in the computer game Tyrian

== See also ==
- Savaran (disambiguation)
- Savaari (disambiguation)
