= San Tammaro =

- Comune
- Comune di San Tammaro
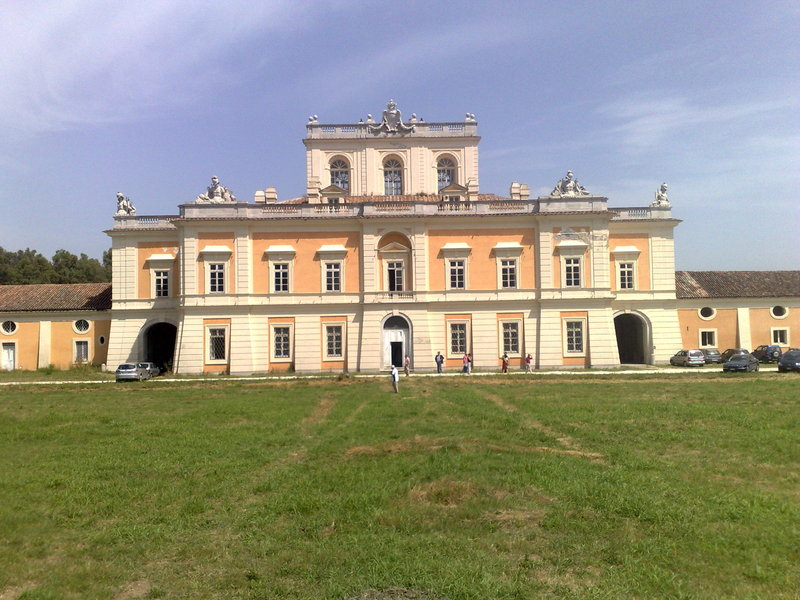
- Royal Palace of Carditello.

- Location within Italy Location within Campania
- Coordinates: 41°5′N 14°14′E
- Country: Italy
- Region: Campania
- Province: Caserta (CE)
- Frazioni: Carditello

Government
  - Mayor: Vincenzo D'Angelo

Area
  - Total: 36.97 km^{2} (14.27 sq mi)
- Elevation: 22 m (72 ft)

Population (30 September 2025)
  - Total: 5,747
  - Density: 155.5/km^{2} (402.6/sq mi)
- Demonym: Tammaresi
- Time zone: UTC+1 (CET)
  - Summer (DST): UTC+2 (CEST)
- Postal code: 81050
- Dialing code: 0823
- Website: Official website

San Tammaro is a comune (municipality) in the Province of Caserta in the Italian region Campania, located about 30 kilometres (19 mi) north of Naples and about 9 kilometres (6 mi) west of Caserta.

San Tammaro borders the following municipalities: Capua, Casal di Principe, Casaluce, Frignano, Santa Maria Capua Vetere, Santa Maria la Fossa, Villa di Briano. The Royal Palace of Carditello is located in the communal territory.
