= Teverola =

- Comune
- Comune di Teverola
- Location within Italy Location within Campania
- Coordinates: 41°0′N 14°13′E
- Country: Italy
- Region: Campania
- Province: Caserta (CE)

Government
  - Mayor: Dario Di Matteo

Area
  - Total: 6.7 km^{2} (2.6 sq mi)
- Elevation: 25 m (82 ft)

Population (31 October 2015)
  - Total: 14,319
  - Density: 2,100/km^{2} (5,500/sq mi)
- Demonym: Teverolesi
- Time zone: UTC+1 (CET)
  - Summer (DST): UTC+2 (CEST)
- Postal code: 81030
- Dialing code: 081
- Patron saint: St. John the Evangelist

Teverola is a comune (municipality) in the Province of Caserta in the Italian region Campania, located about 20 kilometres (12 mi) north of Naples and about 12 kilometres (7 mi) southwest of Caserta.

Teverola borders the following municipalities: Aversa, Carinaro, Casaluce, Santa Maria Capua Vetere.

In 2023 Teverola was selected as the location of a European Gigafactory to make lithium iron phosphate batteries.

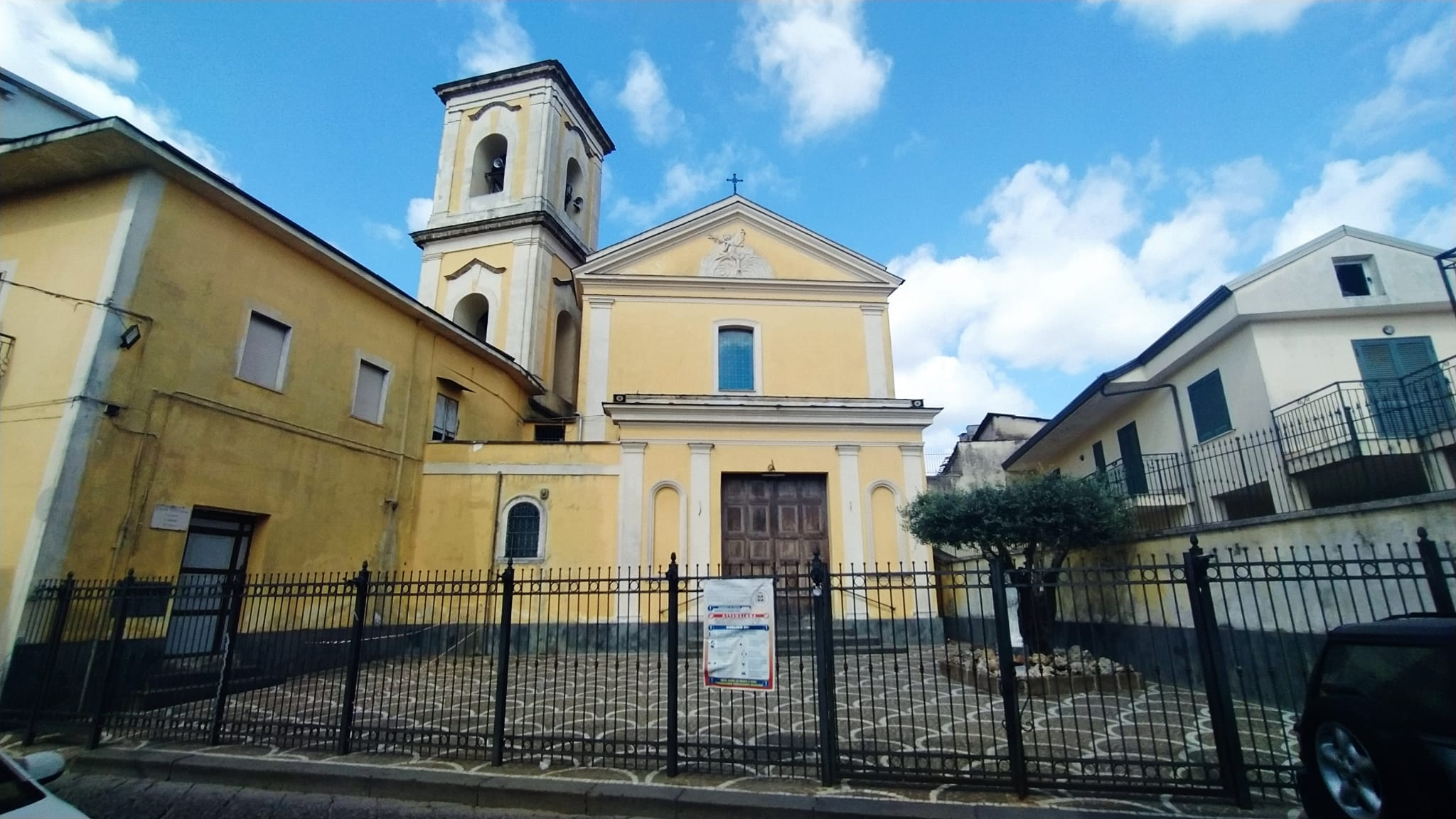
A church in Teverola
