= Sabariya =

The Savaria are a Gond people of Janjgir-Champa district in Chhattisgarh state of India.

== Geographic distribution ==
Most Savaria people live in the Janjgir-Champa district. In other districts, such as Balauda bazar, Bilaspur, Korba and Raigarh, the Sabariya population is fewer and is mostly found in the areas that share borders with the Janjgir-Champa District.

A total of 99 villages were identified as having Sabariya members. Some villages have less than 10 members, others have a higher number. The villages with the highest Sabariya populations are Balauda(500 person) (381 persons), Kamrid (230 persons) and Nawagarh (200 persons).

Among the tehsils, Jaijaipur, Champa, Akaltara, Pamgarh and Janjgir have the highest number of Sabariya villages. Below is a summary of tehsils with the number of villages.

Tehsil	District	No. of Villages
Jaijaipur	Janjgir Champa	15
Champa	Janjgir Champa	13
Akaltara	Janjgir Champa	12
Pamgarh	Janjgir Champa	12
Janjgir	Janjgir Champa	12
Baloda	Janjgir Champa	9
Nawagarh	Janjgir Champa	9
Malkharoda	Janjgir Champa	6
Shakti	Janjgir Champa	5
Dabhara	Janjgir Champa	1
Bailaigarh	Raipur	3
Masturi	Bilaspur	2
	Total	99

As in the article of Father Britto, the Sabariya do not have their own exclusive villages. They share only a part of the villages in which they live, and at the most, 35 families live in a village. However, they stay a little further from the houses of other communities.

== Language ==
K. S. Singh listed Sabariya as Gond Sabaria in Singh 1998 and 1993 and said they speak Telugu. Singh (1993) highlighted the following points on Sabariya:

- They are a Scheduled Tribe.
- They speak Telugu among themselves (in-group).
- They speak Telugu, Chhattisgarhi and Hindi (inter-group).
- They live in Raigarh District, Madhya Pradesh [now in Chhattisgarh].

Most people that we met called their language Telugu, as reported in Singh and Menon 1997. They also called their language Sabri bhasha.

Britto wrote, “They speak a mixture of Telugu and Chhattisgarhi”. There must be a lot of the roots of this language related to Telugu. But their speech is quite different from the Telugu spoken in Andhra Pradesh. Pastor Joseph, who is a Telugu speaker, did not understand their language. He had to learn it and now he can communicate with them to some degree.

In 30 August 2021, a code change request to grant ISO 639-3 code [sdy] for Sabariya has submitted to SIL, but rejected in 15 December 2023 due to lack of evidences.

== Savariaa people ==
The Savaria people we have interviewed said they came to Janjgir-Champa District about eight generations ago from Andhra Pradesh. They did not remember the region in Andhra Pradesh where they had come from. They came to Janjgir-Champa to dig a pond for a king, Raja Bhoj. That pond is still there in Champa town and has now been developed as a park. After digging that pond, the Raja did not make any arrangement for them to go back to their homeland, so they continued to live in Janjgir Champa.

They are called by various names such as Gonds (officially), Sidhar, Zamadhar, Sardar, Adivasi Gond and Savaria. They prefer to be called Telugu Gond (Singh 1998). One man in Kotadabri village said that they were Gonds but they came to be known as Sabariya because they are experts in using “sabal”, an iron rod for digging earth (Singh1998:1064) . The most common name seems to be Savaria, and people use that name most, so we have used that name in this report.

When we travelled in the Janjgir Champa District, the hospital staff could easily identify a Savaria person, especially the elderly people. The men usually keep their hair long and tied in a bundle behind their head. They wear “Gamcha” a piece of cloth worn tightly around their loins.

Men and women work in fields, boys look after cattle, and small girls take care of the babies and houses. Their work includes tilling the ground, digging wells and foundations.

They continue to face land issues, so they meet together annually to discuss issues that they need to demand from the government, especially related to the land.

Primarily, the Savaria people are Hindus and worship multiple gods. Some of the gods they have informed us about are Durga, Narsingha Dev Nath, Burhadev (a household god), Raja Bhoj, Vishnu, Mangal Dev, Sarangani, Paretin Dev, Dulha Dev (a household god).

There is an organization among the Sabariya called “Adivasi Samaj Seva Budadev”, which is just being established. Their office is in Sothi village and the president is Mr Jagdev from Munund village. This organization could become a bond that would unite the people of Sabariya. At this point, there is no strong leadership among them that can bring all of their people to one platform and approach the government.

Marriage takes place only among the Sabariya themselves. They do not intermarry with people from other communities (either giving or taking spouses for their children). Within Savaria, they must marry someone from outside of one's own clan.

The population estimate is very vague. Some estimated it as high as 50,000 people. The document provided by the Adivasi Samaj Seva Budadev listed 86 Sabariya villages and a population of 5,744. This may be a reflection of their actual number because the Savaria villages are widely scattered. The highest populated village has 380 persons, followed by 230 and then 200. All the other villages have less than 200. Some villages have a population as low as nine people.

Though they are tribals, the government has not recognized them as a Scheduled Tribe. The reason is not clear. They are in the process of getting their identity as a Scheduled Tribe recognized by the government.
