= Sabari =

Sabari may refer to:

== Places ==
- Sabari District, Khost Province, Afghanistan
- Sabari Island, Papua New Guinea
- Sabari River, India

== Films ==
- Sabari (2007 film), an Indian Tamil-language action film
- Sabari (2024 film), an Indian Telugu-language action film

== Other uses ==
- Sabari (brand), a food brand marketed by the Kerala State Civil Supplies Corporation (Supplyco)
- Sabari Karthik (born 1990), Indian karateka
- Shabari, an ascetic woman in the Hindu epic Ramayana
