= Dominick Angiolillo =

Italian cardiologist

Dominick J. Angiolillo is an Italian cardiologist.

Angiolillo attended Catholic University of the Sacred Heart Medical School, where he met Attilio Maseri. Angiolillo specialized in cardiology at the Complutense University of Madrid, and completed further training with Carlos Macaya. Angiolillo joined the University of Florida College of Medicine-Jacksonville in 2004. He is an ISI highly cited researcher. Dr. Angiolillo is a staff and interventional cardiologist. He speaks English, Spanish, and Italian. He is Chief of UF Division of Cardiology, Medical Director of UF cardiovascular Center and Cardiovascular Research Program, Interim Associate Dean of Strategic Initiatives, and Interim Chair of the UF Department of Surgery.
