= Pir Savaran =

Pir Savaran پيرسواران
- Village
- Location within Iran
- Coordinates: 34°07′05″N 48°46′43″E
- Country: Iran
- Province: Hamadan
- County: Malayer
- Bakhsh: Samen
- Rural District: Samen

Population (2006)
  - Total: 78
- Time zone: UTC+3:30 (IRST)
  - Summer (DST): UTC+4:30 (IRDT)

Pir Savaran (Persian: پيرسواران, also Romanized as Pīr Savārān and Pīr Sawāran) is a village in Samen Rural District, Samen District, Malayer County, Hamadan Province, Iran. At the 2006 census, its population was 78, in 27 families.
