= Showarow, South Khorasan =

Sawarawn سواران
- village
- Location within Iran
- Coordinates: 32°16′03″N 59°35′56″E
- Country: Iran
- Province: South Khorasan
- County: Sarbisheh
- Bakhsh: Mud
- Rural District: Naharjan

Population (2006)
  - Total: 29
- Time zone: UTC+3:30 (IRST)
  - Summer (DST): UTC+4:30 (IRDT)

Sawarawn (Persian: سواران, also Romanized as Sowārow and Sowārau; also known as Şabūrān, Sabūrān, and Savārān) is a village in Naharjan Rural District, Mud District, Sarbisheh County, South Khorasan Province, Iran. At the 2006 census, its population was 29, in 6 families.
