= Kani Savaran =

Kani Savaran كاني سواران
- Village
- Location within Iran
- Coordinates: 35°04′13″N 47°04′48″E
- Country: Iran
- Province: Kurdistan
- County: Kamyaran
- Bakhsh: Muchesh
- Rural District: Amirabad

Population (2006)
  - Total: 80
- Time zone: UTC+3:30 (IRST)
  - Summer (DST): UTC+4:30 (IRDT)

Kani Savaran (Persian: كاني سواران, also Romanized as Kānī Savārān, Kānī Savarān, and Kāni Sawārān) is a village in Amirabad Rural District, Muchesh District, Kamyaran County, Kurdistan Province, Iran. At the 2006 census, its population was 80, in 27 families. The village is populated by Kurds.
