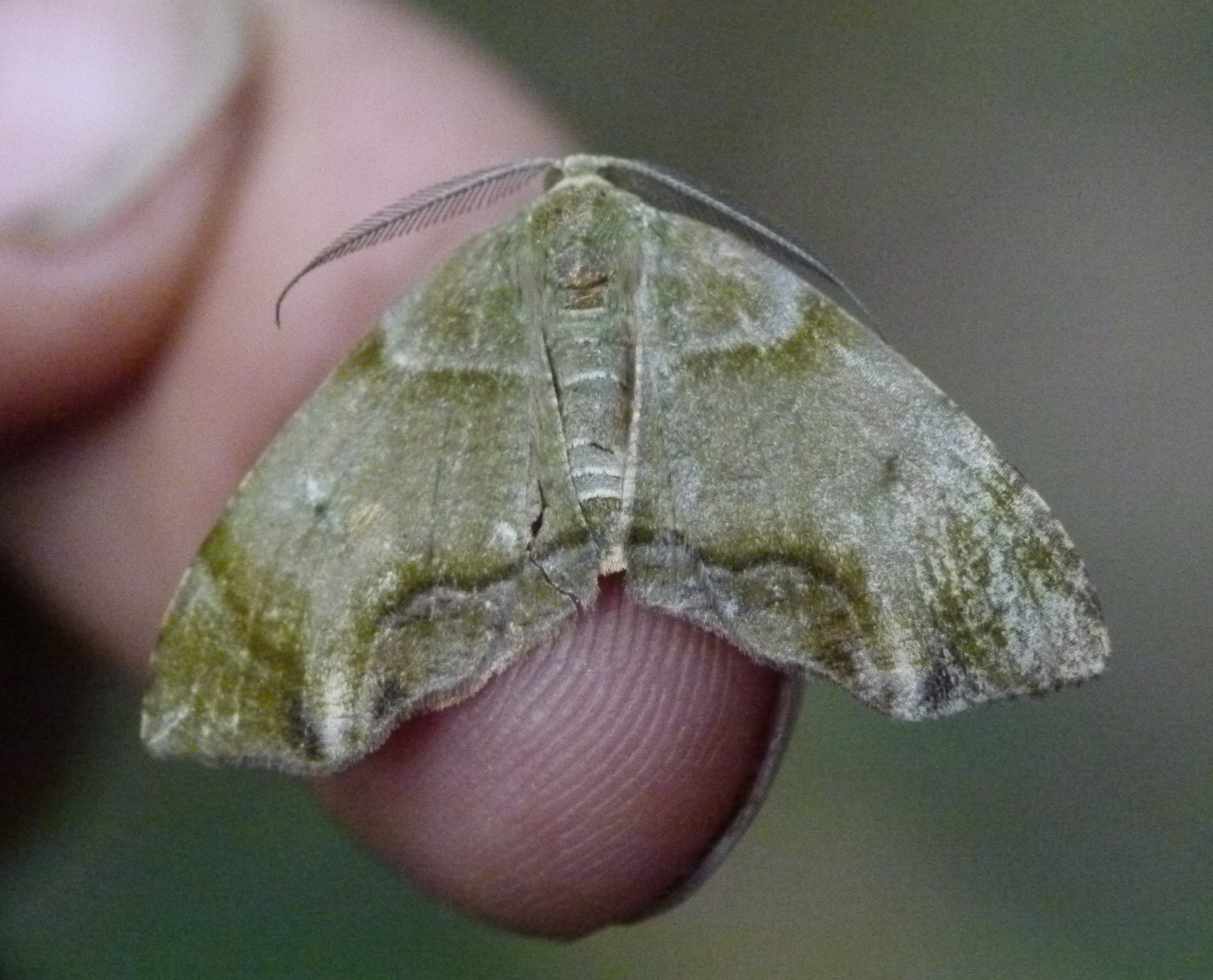
- Achrosis sp. (India)

Scientific classification
- Kingdom: Animalia
- Phylum: Arthropoda
- Class: Insecta
- Order: Lepidoptera
- Family: Geometridae
- Subfamily: Ennominae
- Genus: Achrosis; Guenée in Boisduval & Guenée, 1857

Synonyms
- Sabaria Walker, 1860; Pagrasa Walker, 1861; Omiza Walker, 1861 (preocc. Walker, 1860); Osicerda Walker, 1861; Celesdera Walker, [1863]; Isnisca Walker, [1863]; Zomia Moore, [1868]

= Achrosis =

Genus of geometer moths

Achrosis is a genus of moths in the family Geometridae, found in Europe, Asia, and Australia.

== Species ==
These 51 species belong to the genus Achrosis:

- Achrosis addicta Yazaki, 2020
- Achrosis alienata (Walker, 1862)
- Achrosis anagoga (Prout, 1931)
- Achrosis berytana (Rebel, 1911)
- Achrosis calcicola Holloway, [1994]
- Achrosis classeyi Holloway, [1994]
- Achrosis cochinchinensis Tautel, 2020
- Achrosis costimaculata (Moore, 1868)
- Achrosis elegans (West, 1929)
- Achrosis euchroes (Prout, 1917)
- Achrosis excitata (Prout, 1928)
- Achrosis fulvifusa (Warren, 1901)
- Achrosis grammicaria Yazaki, 2020
- Achrosis incitata (Walker, 1862)
- Achrosis innotata (Warren, 1897)
- Achrosis intexta (Swinhoe, 1891)
- Achrosis isochyta Meyrick, 1915
- Achrosis jacquelinae Orhant, 2000
- Achrosis kerangatis Holloway, 1996
- Achrosis likianga (Wehrli, 1940)
- Achrosis lilacina (Warren, 1901)
- Achrosis lithosiaria (Walker, 1862)
- Achrosis longifurca Holloway, [1994]
- Achrosis major Tautel, 2020
- Achrosis multidentata (Warren, 1894)
- Achrosis obliquilineata (Warren, 1893)
- Achrosis pallida (Moore, 1877)
- Achrosis paupera (Butler, 1881)
- Achrosis perfulvata (Prout, 1924)
- Achrosis pudens Tautel, 2020
- Achrosis pulchra (Wileman, 1914)
- Achrosis pulchricolor (Warren, 1906)
- Achrosis purpurascens (Warren, 1894)
- Achrosis pyrrhularia Guenée, [1858]
- Achrosis quadraria Warren, 1893
- Achrosis recitata Holloway, [1994]
- Achrosis rigorata (Prout, 1932)
- Achrosis rondelaria (Fabricius, 1775)
- Achrosis rosearia (Leech, 1891)
- Achrosis rufescens (Butler, 1880)
- Achrosis rufipennis (Warren, 1898)
- Achrosis sandroi Beck & Karisch, 2004
- Achrosis saturata Yazaki, 2020
- Achrosis selinae Beck & Karisch, 2008
- Achrosis semifulva (Pagenstecher, 1886)
- Achrosis semirubra (Warren, 1907)
- Achrosis serpentinaria (Walker, 1866)
- Achrosis spurca (Swinhoe, 1902)
- Achrosis tinctoria Tautel, 2020
- Achrosis transviridis Holloway, [1994]
- Achrosis viridapex (Holloway, 1976)
