= Pamgarh =

- town
- Nickname: pmg
- Location in Chhattisgarh, India Pamgarh (India)
- Coordinates: 21°53′0″N 82°27′0″E
- Country: India
- State: Chhattisgarh
- District: Janjgir-Champa
- Elevation: 288 m (945 ft)

Languages
  - Official: Hindi, Chhattisgarhi
- Time zone: UTC+5:30 (IST)
- PIN: 495554
- Telephone code: 07818
- Vehicle registration: CG
- Nearest city: Janjgir

Pamgarh is a town in Janjgir-Champa district, Chhattisgarh, India. It is one of the 36 Garh of Chhattisgarh state. Pamgarh is on National Highway 200 National Highway 200 (India) and the Garh (fort) is visible from the road. Pamgarh hosts a police station. Nearby villages are Loharsi and Kharod which is famous for various ponds. Archeological items found during excavations include extended spinal cords.

== Geography ==
It is located at an altitude of 288 m above MSL.

== School Education ==
Pamgarh is served by several government and private schools offering primary, secondary and higher secondary education. Major educational institutions include:

School	Management	Level
Government Mahamaya Higher Secondary School, Pamgarh	Government	Higher Secondary
Government Girls' Higher Secondary School, Pamgarh	Government	Higher Secondary
Swami Atmanand Excellent Hindi & English Medium Government Higher Secondary School, Pamgarh	Government	Higher Secondary
Chhattisgarh Gyan Jyoti Higher Secondary School, Pamgarh	Private	Higher Secondary
DAV MM Public School, Pamgarh	Private	School
The Rajkumar Public School, Pamgarh	Private	School
Karmfal Public School, Pamgarh	Private	School
St. Joseph's J & J Mission School (English Medium), Pamgarh	Private	School
St. Joseph's J & J Mission School (Hindi Medium), Pamgarh	Private	School
Brilliant Model School, Pamgarh	Private	School
Samarpan Public School, Pamgarh	Private	School
Vidya Niketan School, Pamgarh	Private	School
Dream Land Public School, Pamgarh	Private	School
Delhi Marthoma Public School, Kutrabod	Private	School

== Higher Education ==
Pamgarh is home to several institutions of higher education, including government and private colleges affiliated with the Shaheed Nandkumar Patel Vishwavidyalaya, Raigarh.

- Dr. B. R. Ambedkar Government College, Pamgarh – A government degree college established in 2011 and affiliated with Shaheed Nandkumar Patel Vishwavidyalaya.
- Sant Shiromani Guru Ghasidas College, Pamgarh is a private college located in Pamgarh, Janjgir–Champa district, Chhattisgarh, India. Established in 2003, the college is affiliated with Shaheed Nandkumar Patel Vishwavidyalaya, Raigarh, and is recognized under Section 2(f) of the University Grants Commission (UGC).

The college is managed by Karmfal Shikshan Samiti, Joraila, Pamgarh, an educational society committed to promoting quality education in the region. It offers undergraduate and postgraduate programmes in arts, science, commerce, computer applications and selected postgraduate disciplines in accordance with the curriculum prescribed by the affiliated university. Karmfal Shikshan Samiti also manages Chhattisgarh Gyan Jyoti Higher Secondary School, Pamgarh and Karmfal Public School, Pamgarh, providing educational opportunities from school to higher education.

- Chaitanya Science and Arts College, Pamgarh – A private college established in 2001 and affiliated with Shaheed Nandkumar Patel Vishwavidyalaya.
- G.R.D. College, Pamgarh – A private degree college established in 2001 and affiliated with Shaheed Nandkumar Patel Vishwavidyalaya.

== Location ==
The nearest airport is Raipur Airport.

National Highway 200 passes through Pamgarh.

== Tourism ==
Lakshmaneshwar Temple and Dewarghata are tourist attractions in the vicinity. Sheori Narayan is a tourist place nearby. It got the name Sheori Narayan because Lord Rama ate ber (a type of fruit) at this place, with Shabari. So actually it is Shabri+Narayan(Rama).

Mehandi is one of the small village near Pamagarh. It is famous as the location for the temple of Lord Hanumana.
