= Malaric =

- King of the Suevi
- Reign: 585
- Predecessor: Audeca
- Dynasty: Suevic

Timeline of the Suebic Kings

Malaric or Amalaric, was the last claimant to the kingship of the Suevi of Galicia. In 585, after the final king, Audeca, was defeated and captured by the Visigoths, Malaric—who claimed to be related to king Miro—rose in rebellion. According to John of Biclar, he was "defeated by King Leovigild's generals and captured, then presented in chains to Leovigild."

== Sources ==
- Arias, Jorge C. "Identity and Interactions: The Suevi and the Hispano-Romans." University of Virginia: Spring 2007.

Preceded by Audeca	King of Galicia; 585	Succeeded by conquest
