= Angiolillo Arcuccio =

Italian painter

Angiolillo Arcuccio (Naples, active 1440–1492) was an Italian painter of the early Renaissance. Few works are authenticated. He is best exemplified by the Annunciation altarpiece (1483) at the church of the Annunciation just outside Sant'Agata de' Goti, north of Naples. Ferrari and other scholars note a Flemish influence in later paintings. He collaborated with Gaspare de Orta in painting for a salon in Castelnuovo.

== Bibliography ==
- Bryan, Michael (1889). Walter Armstrong; Robert Edmund Graves (eds.). Dictionary of Painters and Engravers, Biographical and Critical. Vol. II L-Z. London: George Bell and Sons. p. 396.
