= Sabaria (Iberia) =

Territory in Iberia (4th c. - 6th c.)

Iberia in 560.

Sabaria was a semi-autonomous territory in Iberia, between the Kingdom of the Suebi and the Visigothic kingdom, in the 4th-6th centuries that extended from Benavente to Salamanca and from Sayago to Simancas.

Sabaria was autonomous enough to mint its own currency, although this coinage is sometimes confused with the Visigothic mint of Senimure-Semure in the current city of Zamora.
