= Kaleshwarnath Temple, Pithampur =

Kaleshwarnath Mandir, Pithampur is a temple of Shiva located at Pithampur in the Janjgir–Champa district of Chhattisgarh.The temple is located at Pithampur, which is 13 Km from Janjgir and 9 km from Champa

== Festivals and history ==
The temple is situated on the bank of the Hasdeo River. A ten-day fair is held at the temple during the festival of Maha Shivaratri and Rang Panchami. Every year on Rang Panchami the procession for Lord Shiva is carried out in palanquin. The Shiva Lingum is taken to Ghats of Hasdeo River, where after the Holy Bath and Puja it is taken back to the temple. The Naga Sadhus also take part in a fair that has been held at the temple for over 100 years. Over a lakh of people visit the temple during the ten-day-long festive and religious fairs held twice a year.

Records indicate that temple is more than 300 years old; however, according to a stone inscription on the temple, the current temple structure was built by Jagmal Gangji, a railway contractor from Kumbhariya, Kutch. The stone plaque on back of temple mentions that the construction of the temple was started in V.S. 1949 (1892 AD) and was completed on Kartik Sudi 2, V.S. 1953 (1896 AD) by Mistri Gokul Dhanji working under Jagmal Gangji. Jagmal Gangji built the temple at his own cost out of reverence and dedicated it to Hindu community.

Pandit Chhabinath Dwivedi of Champa wrote and published "Kaleshwar Mahatmya Stotram" in Sanskrit in 1897 in praise of Lord Kaleshwar Nath of Pithampur. The first Mahant of this Math was Shri Shankar Giri Ji Maharaj and the Math was affiliated to Tilbhandeshwar Math of Kashi. The Thakur family the jamindar of Champa and the Sarbarakar families donated generously from time to time for up-keepment and maintainace of temple. The temple also houses a statue of Rani Sahiba of Champa Estate.
