= Pithampur, Chhattisgarh =

Village in Chhattisgarh, India

Pithampur is a village located in the Janjgir Tehsil of Janjgir-Champa district in Chhattisgarh, India. It is situated 15km away from Janjgir, which is both the district and the sub-district headquarters. Champa, located 10km from the village, is the nearest significant town in the district and is also a railway station. It is located on the banks of the Hasdeo River. Kaleshwarnath Temple, one of the most important Shiva temples of Chhattisgarh, is situated here.
