= Jairam Valjee Chouhan =

Rai Bahadur Jairam Valjee
- Born: Jairam Valjee Chouhan; 1892; Kumbharia, Cutch
- Died: 1956 (aged 63–64); Raigarh, India
- Occupations: miner, industrialist, railway contractor, philanthropist

Jairam Valjee Chouhan, Rai Bahadur, MBE (1892–1956), better known as Rai Bahadur Jairam Valjee, was a Kutchi railway contractor, mill-owner, miner & philanthropist, who established himself at Jairamnagar and Raigarh, India.

== Birth ==
Jairam was born to Valjee Vira Chouhan, who belonged to Mestri community of Kutch, who are noted for their architect skills and contributions in Railway. He was born in 1892 in his native village Kumbharia in Kutch. His father worked as a railway contractor.

== Career ==
Jairam Valjee carried on his father's legacy and earned a name as a railway contractor, especially working for Bengal Nagpur Railway completing several bridges and doubling of railway lines. In years 1921–29, he camped near Paraghat for construction of railway bridge over Arpa river and doubling of rail lines of Bilaspur-Raigarh section. He used to work as railway contractor with his main office at Raigarh and there is a colony named after him called Jairam Valjee Colony at Raigarh. In many railway and civil contracts he worked in syndicate with fellow Mistri railway contractors like Jagmal Gangji Sawaria, Rai Saheb Mulji Jagmal Sawaria of Bilaspur and Shamji Gangji Sawaria and Rai Saheb Harilal Shamji of Raigarh.

He was also one of the Class - A contractor for government's public works department of C. P. & Berar. He also started a large brick kiln on banks of Arpa river at Jairamnagar to manufacture on large scale bricks needed by railways and other construction works. Ramgarh Cantonment works were one of major works done by him.

He ventured in to dolomite and limestone mining business in beginning in 1918 and soon became owner of several dolomite and limestone mines in erstwhile Central Provinces and Berar. He was sole proprietor of whole of Jairamnagar. Among the limestone and dolomite mines he owned were Bhilain and Bhadeswar quarries near Jairamnagar. He also owned a large Latia quarry at Latia village (near Akaltara) the total area of which was 67.53 acres and dolomite mines near Jairamnagar, Barpali and at Kalunga in Orissa. He held certificate for approval of all minerals in Central Provinces and Berar and also whole of Eastern States Agency.

He also owned ice-factory at Bilaspur and two rice-mills at Jairamnagar. Further, he founded a sugar-factory at Jairamnagar, foundation of which was laid on 10 February 1940, where the chief guest of honor was the Governor of C.P. & Berar, Francis Verner Wylie. He used his farm lands in Jairamnagar for large scale production of sugarcane, required as raw material for his sugar factory. A jaggary making unit and rice-mill were also started by him at Jairamnagar.

He was also a member of the Executive Committee of both the District and Provincial War Committees of CP. and Berar.

== Philanthropy ==
Further, he was also known for his philanthropy. He is accredited to have built a primary school named Valjee Primanry School with teachers quarter at Jairamnagar, Kunwarbai Charitable Dispensary, weekly markets, wells and roads. He also built a Shiva temple and several wells, markets, roads, hospitals & Dharamshalas in Jairamnagar. He also donated money to build Raigarh Town Hall. In 1940, to commemorate the visit of Governor of C.P. & Berar, on occasion of founding of sugar factory at Jairamnagar, he donated a fully equipped Ambulance car to Red Cross.

== Honors ==
British authorities had given him title firstly Rai Saheb, which was elevated to Rai Bahadur in 1941 for his achievements in business and philanthropic works.

The local British government changed the name of village from Khaira to Jairamnagar in his honor.

The railway station which was earlier known as Paraghat was named Jairamnagar railway station after him on 1 September 1939 by Bengal Nagpur Railway authorities being the only Railway Station in the whole of India to have been named after an individual businessman.

He was made Member of the Most Excellent Order of the British Empire on 1 January 1945 by British authorities.

== Death ==
He died in 1956 at his Raigarh bungalow survived by wife and several sons and daughters.
