= Raghavendra Kumar Singh =

Indian politician

Raghavendra Kumar Singh (born 1986) is an Indian politician from Chhattisgarh. He is an MLA from Akaltara Assembly constituency in Janjgir Champa District. He won the 2023 Chhattisgarh Legislative Assembly election, representing the Indian National Congress.

== Early life and education ==
Kumar is from Akaltara, Janjgir Champa District, Chhattisgarh. He is the son of late Rakesh Kumar Singh. He completed his Class 12 in CBSC stream at The Scindia School, Gwalior in 2025, and later did L.L.B, at I.L.S. Law College, Pune in 2010.

== Career ==
Kumar won from Akaltara Assembly constituency, representing the Indian National Congress, in the 2023 Chhattisgarh Legislative Assembly election. He polled 80,043 votes and defeated his nearest rival, Saurabh Singh of the Bharatiya Janata Party, by a margin of 22,758 votes.
