= Mulji Jagmal Sawaria =

Indian coal miner, railway contractor and businessman

Mulji Jagmal Sawaria, R.S. also known as Moolji Jagmal (1899–1956) was a noted coal miner, railway contractor and businessman from Kutch, who established himself at Bilaspur, India.

== Early life ==
Moolji was born in 1899 to Jagmal Gangji Sawaria and Veera Bai at Kumbharia in erstwhile Princely State of Cutch. He belonged to a small but enterprising KGK community and born in Gangani family of Kumbharia. Mulji Jagmal's father Jagmal Gangji and uncles all worked as a railway contractor in Rajnandgaon – Raipur -Bilaspur -Raigarh - Jharsuguda section of Bengal Nagpur Railway in 1888–90 with contemporary railway contractors like Khora Ramji. Jagmal Gangji was also involved in cosntruction of Bilaspur–Katni line and Umaria Coalfild Railway of BNR in 1886–91. Jagmal Gangji also built Bilaspur railway station jointly with Jeram Mandan in 1890 and later made the town his home. Jagmal Gangji with his brothers Shamji Gangji also built Moti Mahal Raigarh Mulji's father Jagmal Gangji were seven brothers, who worked together as a syndicate as Hindu Undivided Family to do large scale works of railway laying across British India with other contractors from their community.

== Railway & PWD contractor ==
He and his two brothers joined their father as Railway contractor at an early age, who had established himself as a contractor for Bengal Nagpur Railway. The road bridge connecting Bilaspur to Sarkanda was built by Jagmal Gangji in year 1926. The list of buildings and structures built by the family are Bilaspur Railway Station Building (1889–90) Bilaspur Railway Yard (1890), Lakshmi Narayan Mandir & Bilaspur Railway Market (1890), European Officer's Club (1896), Railway Hindi Medium School (1902), Railway English Medium School (1903), Railway Sports Stadium aka North East Institute (1914), BNR Railway Hospital (1918) Town Hall (1925–26), Arpa River Bridge at Sarkanda (1926), Railway DRM office (1929), Shivnath Officer's Rest House (1930), The Mahaveer Gunj aka Gol Bazar (1936), Kunj Bihari Market (1936), CMD College (1944) to name a few.

Mulji Jagmal and his brother Ranchhod Jagmal (1901–1963) were involved in laying of railway line from Anuppur to Barwadih section of Bombay, Baroda & Central India Railway in 1918, Sini to Purulia doubling in 1921 for Bengal Nagpur Railway along with fellow contractors from his community and several other railway works for bridges and lines.

He worked from Bilaspur as his head office and had other branches at Jharsuguda, Raigarh. On some big railway contracts he worked jointly in syndicate with Rai Bahadur Jairam Valji Chauhan of Jairamnagar, Shamji Gangji of Raigarh, Ruda Walji of Raipur, Rai Bahadur Devraj Daya of Jharsuguda, Rai Saheb Harilal Shamji of Raigarh, Govind Jiwan Gangji of Bankura, Nanji Govindji of Tatanagar, Raghu Karson of Cuttack, Dhanraj Wason of Bilaspur and the other noted railway contractors from his community like Ambalal Khora, Manji Jeram, Jeram Mandan and Arjan Ladhha.

The Sawaria family were seven brothers, they all worked in a syndicate with Jagmal Gangji at Bilaspur, Valji at Raipur, Shamji Gangji at Raigarh, Vasta Gangji at Kharsia, Ramji Gangji at Jharia, Jiwan Gangji at Adra-Bankura.

In 1935, Rai Sahib Moolji Jagmal laid a private 8 miles long narrow gauge rail line and bridge connecting their Bilaspur railway site with their brick-kiln across Arpa River at Lingiyadih. This privately owned line was dismantled in 1948 after independence of India.

The old road bridge across Arpa river of Bilaspur town connecting to Sarkanda area, which was also built by his father Jagmal Gangji in 1926 was made two-lane and refurbished by Mulji Jagmal & brothers in 1941.

== Miner ==
Mulji Jagmal inherited his share in Basra Colliery located in Jharia coalfied belt, which was founded by his father Jagmal Gangji and his brothers, Ramji Gangji of Jharia, Shamji Gangji of Raigarh, Jiwan Gangji of Bankura and others. Jiwan Gangji also owned Pinalgoria Colliery at Nawagarh in Purulia district.

Further, in 1921–22, at young age he discovered coal near Pali, in erstwhile Central Provinces and Berar while doing railway contracts and founded Donganala Colliery which he operated jointly with his younger brother Ranchhod Jagmal Sawaria. Thus Mulji Jagmal gets credit to not only discover but also establish first working coal mines in Central Provinces of British India.

He started in decades of 1930–40 the limestone and dolomite mines near Akaltara at Latia-Pakaria, Jairamnagar and at Khaira. He also owned a manganese mine near Tumsar.

After independence of India, in 1953, he was responsible for discovery of chromite near Pali in Madhya Pradesh, now a part of Chhattisgarh. He discovered Chromite near his Donganala colliery in on a hillock at a village called Agaria. Upon his information later the area was surveyed by Geological Survey of India.

== Others ==
Mulji Jagmal also owned a huge brick kilns at Torwa, Lingiyadih and Lal Khadan area. The bricks made were largely supplied to railways. In 1935, Rai Sahib Moolji Jagmal Savaria and Ranchhod Jagmal laid a private 1.9 miles long narrow gauge rail line connecting their Bilaspur railway site with their brick-kiln across Arpa River to Lingiyadih. This line was dismantled in 1948 after independence of India.

He started factories manufacturing match boxes and fire-works in Bilaspur at Jagmal Chowk, named as Laxmi Match Works in 1936 and was the first match factory in the Central Provinces and Berar.

He owned large valuable estate in Bilaspur, Lingiyadih, Raigarh, Jharsuguda, Jairamnagar and at also agricultural lands, farmhouses and mansion in his native state in Kutch at Anjar and Kumbharia.

== Public life ==
He was appointed as a member of District Council of Bilaspur and was also on Advisory board to Bilaspur Municipal Committee and town planning. He was awarded title of Rai Sahib by British in 1941 for his works of public welfare and charity.

He encouraged to keep alive the Gujarati culture and the all Gujaratis living in and around Bilaspur, used to assemble at his house in decade of 1940s to play Garba and hold Navaratri celebrations and thus all Gujarati people united to form later an umbrella organisation of Gujarati Samaj.

== Philanthropy ==
Jagmal Gangji Sawaria father of Mulji Jagmal, built Kaleshwarnath Shiva Temple temple at Pithampur also other Shiva & Laxminarayan Temple Bilaspur at Jharsuguda and Amarkantak, further he donated silver gates at Kedarnath Temple, whereas his brother Shamji Gangji donated marble tiles at Kedarnath.

He donated four of his shops in market area for maintenance of the Hindu temple built by his father Jagmal Gangji in 1890, which stands near Bilaspur railway station. He with his brother had built a charitable hospital and dispensary at Ratanpur on 13 February 1940, which was opened by Her E. Lady Wylie, wife of Governor of Central Province Sir Francis Verner Wylie.

After his death, in 1969, his wife Smt Laxmi Bai, built a hall-cum-guest house, in his memory, which is named as Rai Saheb Moolji Jagmal Mahila Satsang Bhawan. It is used for satsang by local Hindu women and also provides free staying facility to overnight travellers, especially to sadhus and poor people.

== Death ==
He died in 1956 due heart attack at Bilaspur.

== Legacy ==
Present day Jagmal Chowk and Jagmal Block in Bilaspur are named after his father, Jagmal Gangji Sawaria. Jagmal Block was also known as Mulji Jagmal Marg.

Further, he instituted a fund for Mulji Jagmal Running Trophy for yearly Football tournament held by railway department, which are held at railway sports stadium, which also was erected by him in 1935.
