= Rai Bahadur =

Honour bestowed during British rule in India

Rai & Rai Bahadur
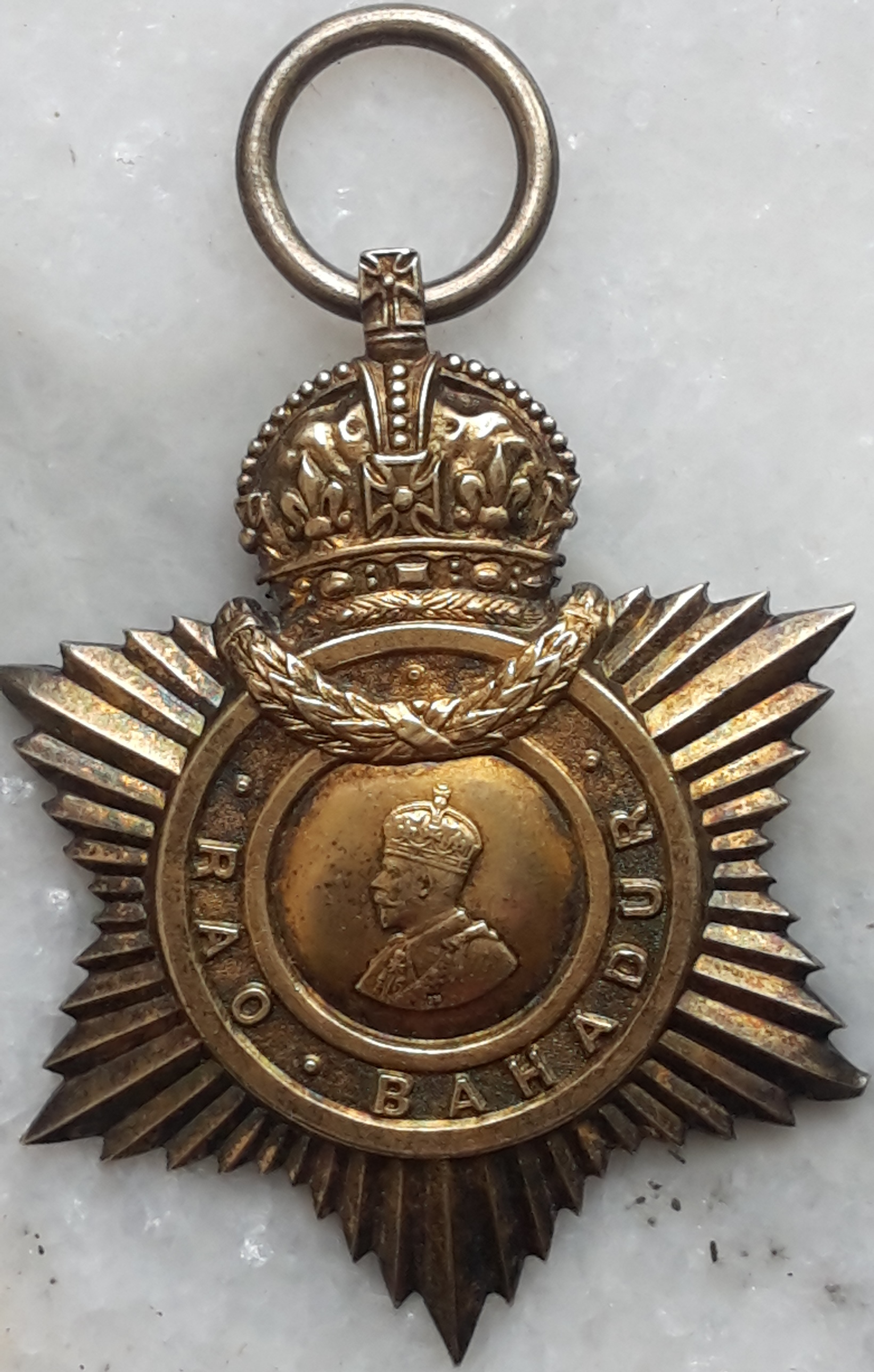
- Title Badge for Rao Bahadur
- Type: Civilian Honour
- Country: British Raj
- Presented by: Viceroy of India
- Eligibility: Hindu
- Status: Abolished

Precedence
- Next (higher): Dewan Bahadur
- Equivalent: Khan Bahadur; Sardar Bahadur
- Next (lower): Rai Sahib

Rai Bahadur (in North India) or Roy Bahadur (in Bengal) and Rao Bahadur (in Deccan), abbreviated R.B., was a title of honour bestowed during British Raj to Indian subjects from the Hindu, Jain, Buddhist and Indian Christian communities in recognition of public or government service. From 1911, the title was accompanied by a medal called a Title Badge.The title came next in the order of precedence to "Diwan Bahadur" and above "Rao Sahib". The corresponding equivalent title to "Rao Bahadur" amongst Muslims and Parsis was Khan Bahadur and for Sikhs, it was Sardar Bahadur.

Translated, Rai or Rao means "King", and Bahadur means "Brave".

The title was given to recognise and reward individuals who had made significant contributions in various fields such as public service, commerce, industry, and philanthropy.

Those awarded the Rai Bahadur title were usually drawn from the lower rank of Rai Sahib, both of which were below the rank of Dewan Bahadur. These titles were subordinate to the two orders of knighthood: the Order of the Raj and the higher Order of the Star of India. A holder of a Rai Sahib, Rai Bahadur or Dewan Bahadur title came lower in the order of precedence.

== Selected recipients awarded the Rai/Rao Bahadur title ==
=== Zamindars ===
- Raja Ray Rajchandra Das Bahadur, noted Bengali philanthropist, zamindar and businessman, icon of Bengal Renaissance, Raja of Janbazar Raj.
- Ray Bahadur Babu Radharaman Das, Zamindar of shayestaganj, from Bengal
- Nalini Kanta Ray Dastidar, Zamindar of Sylhet
- Maharaja Jagadindra Nath Moitra Roy Bahadur was a noted zamindar of Natore from Bengel

=== Academics and education ===
- Pt. Sadashiva Jairam Dehadrai, Professor of Sanskrit, Jabalpur College.
- Priya Nath Dutt, assistant registrar, Punjab University
- S.N (Satya Nand) Mukarji, the sixth, and longest-serving (as of 2023) principal of St. Stephen's College, Delhi from 1926 to 1945. (St. Stephen's is a foundation constituent college of Delhi University.) Wrangler in the Mathematical Tripos from Queens' College, Cambridge. Member, Lindsay Commission on Higher Education

=== Activists and politicians ===
- Narayan Meghaji Lokhande, father of trade union movement in India.
- S. A. Saminatha Iyer, Indian independence activist.
- Manik Lal Joshi, chief minister of Bundi, Rajputana
- Motilal Nehru, Indian independence activist, he later surrendered it during the non-co-operation movement of 1921.
- H.H Dr. Rai Rajeshwar Bali Bahadur OBE, MLA Taluqdar Raja of Rampur Dariyabad, Honorary Magistrate, Barabanki, Minister of Education, Medical Relief & Public Health and Local Self-Government of the UP Assembly
- Mahadev Govind Ranade, Indian scholar, social reformer, judge and author. He was one of the founding members of the Indian National Congress.
- Jaswantraj Mehta Indian politician, elected to the Lok Sabha; elected to Jodhpur State Legislative Assembly in 1947
- C. Jambulingam Mudaliar (1857–1906), Indian politician and freedom-fighter
- Gopal Hari Deshmukh, Indian writer, activist, and thinker from Maharashtra, popularly known as Lokhitwadi
- T. M. Jambulingam Mudaliar (1890–1970), philanthropist and freedom fighter who gave 620 acres (250 ha) of land to establish NLC India Limited
- Kurma Venkata Reddy Naidu, Chief Minister of Madras Presidency.
- Seth Vishandas Nihalchand, Sindhi politician, social reformer, philanthropist
- Chhotu Ram, Minister for Agriculture and Home Affairs, erstwhile Punjab, 1945. First Indian-origin Speaker of the Punjab Legislative Assembly
- Cruz Fernandez, businessman, and municipal chairman. He was the longest-serving chairman of Tuticorin municipality and is considered the father and architect of modern Tuticorin (now called Thoothukudi)
- Shyam Nandan Sahay, Founder vice chancellor of Babasaheb Bhimrao Ambedkar Bihar University, Member of the 1st Lok Sabha

=== Civil servants and government officials ===
- Pushkar Thakur, District Magistrate and Collector of Champaran. Title awarded in 1945 in recognition of his outstanding service as Special Officer for War Risks Insurance for Bihar and Orissa, covering an area larger than that of the United Kingdom, Belgium and the Netherlands combined. The Viceroy Lord Wavell personally wrote a letter congratulating Pushkar Thakur on the contribution of Bihar and Orissa in the National War Effort, which had been the highest in the country.
- Jagan Nath Bhandari Raj Ratan, Dewan of Idar State
- Lada Damodar Das, extrajudicial assistant commissioner in the Punjab
- Dewan E.K. Govindan, writer, civil servant and ruled the first malayali man Pudukotta administratively, then served as Dewan of Pudukotta
- Dewan Jaggatnath, secretary to the municipal committee and district board, Dera Ismail Khan
- Sahu Parsotam Saran Kothiwala, member of the district board, Moradabad
- Lala Jai Lal, member of the Municipal Committee, Simla
- A. Savarinatha Pillai, Assistant Commissioner of Income Tax, Madras Presidency; winner of King's Coronation Award for Distinguished Public Service, London
- Akshey Kumar Sarkar, superintendent, Department of Commerce and Industry, Government of India
- Betharam Sarma, sub-deputy collector, Tezpur, Assam
- Rai Bahadur Pandit Ram Prasad Tewari (Darbari) – The first Indian officiating Garrison engineer in the Military Engineer Services of British India.

=== Commerce and industry ===
- Jamnalal Bajaj, industrialist; Bajaj later returned the title
- Dewan Bahadur P. Somasundaram Chettiar, Coimbatore - industrialist and pioneer in textiles.
- Jagmal Raja Chauhan (1887–1974), better known as "Rai Bahadur Jagmal Raja", industrialist and railway contractor, private banker, aviation pioneer and philanthropist
- Jairam Valji Chauhan MBE (or "Chouhan"; 1892–1956), better known as "Rai Bahadur Jairam Valjee", was a Kutchi railway contractor, mill-owner, miner and philanthropist, at Jairamnagar and Raigarh
- Devraj Daya of Jharsuguda — a Kutchi railway contractor, philanthropist.
- Seth Sarupchand Hukamchand (1874–1959) of Indore, Holkar State, merchant–industrialist and a prominent leader of the Jain community
- Gujar Mal Modi, founder of the Modi Group
- Mohan Singh Oberoi, founder of Oberoi Group

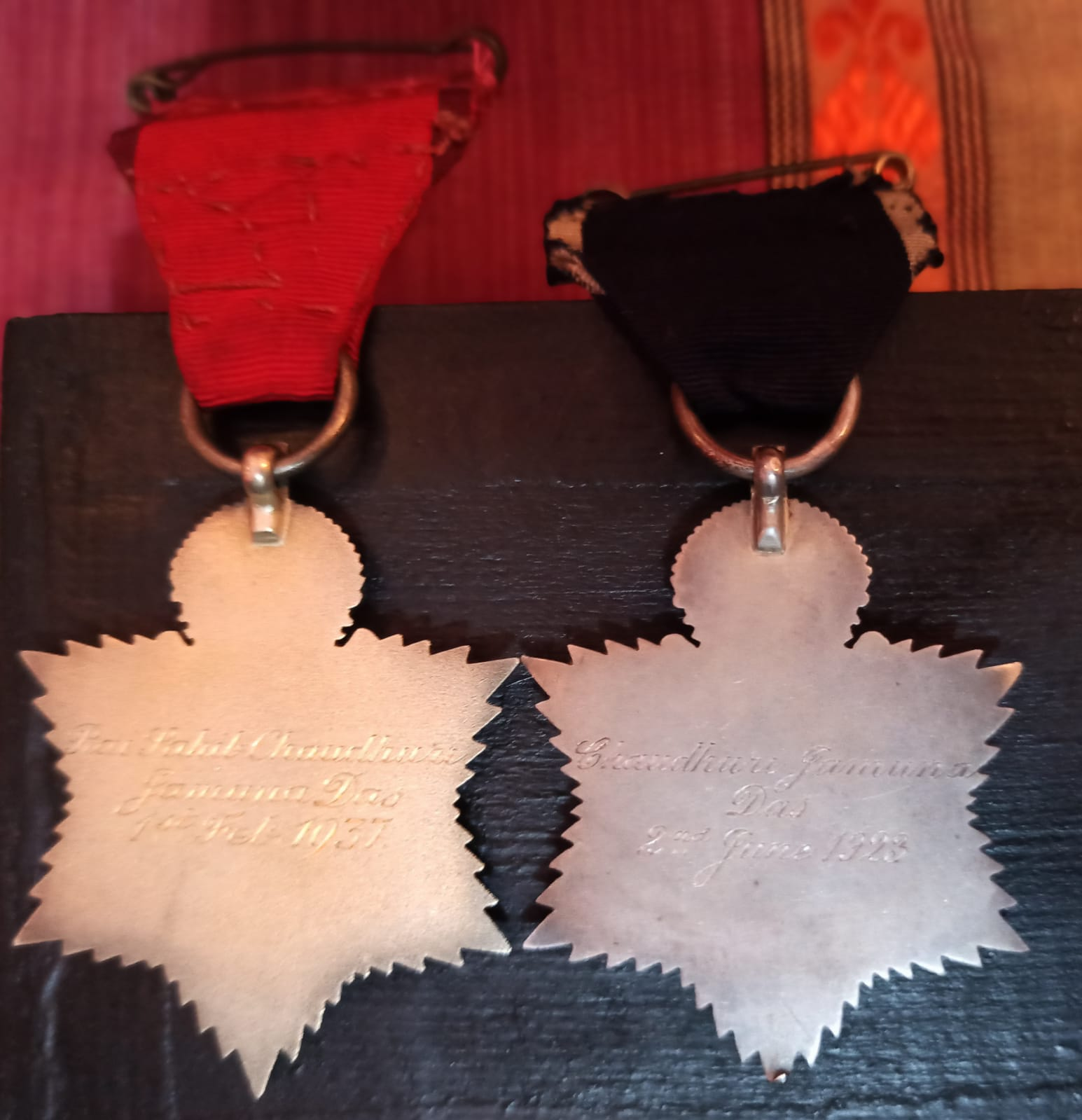
Rai Sahib and Rai Bahadur title badges of Jamuna Das Choudhury

- Hariram Goenka (1862–1935), businessman and cofounder with his brothers, including Badridas Goenka, of Goenka group of Kolkata
- Badridas Goenka CIE (1883–1973), industrialist and business tycoon; cofounder of the original Goenka Group from Kolkata, of which the RPG Group is a successor; first chairman of the State Bank of India

=== Engineering, science and medicine ===
- Kailash Chandra Bose CIE OBE, first knighted Indian physician.
- Upendranath Brahmachari FRSM FRS (1873–1946), Bengal-born physician and scientist. Synthesised urea stibamine, determining its effectiveness as a treatment for the disease Kala Azar
- Balkishen Kaul, surgeon, lecturer, and superintendent of Lahore Medical college
- Puttana Venkatramana Raju (1894–1975), civil engineer, industrial advisor to government of India, educationist
- Ram Dhan Singh, pioneer agricultural scientist, principal, College of Agriculture, Lyallpur, erstwhile Punjab, 1947

=== Law and justice ===
- Babu Ram Sadan Bhattacharji, deputy magistrate, Bengal
- Chaudhary Dewan Chand Saini MBE, (born 1887) of Gurdaspur, Punjab, distinguished lawyer of Punjab High Court, leader of the criminal bar; elected member of Legislative Council of colonial Punjab
- Rajendranath Dutt, judge, Bengal
- Soti Raghubans Lal, subordinate judge, Shahjehanpur
- Sadh Achraj Lal, honorary magistrate and member of the municipal board, Mirzapur
- Jwala Prasad, government pleader
- Raghunath Sharan, District Judge in Bihar
- Babu Bahadur Singh, honorary magistrate, Pilibhit
- Babu Shuhrat Singh, Zemindar of Chandpur and honorary magistrate, Basti
- N S Nanjundiah (1879–1953), of Nanjangud distinguished advocate of Chief Court of Mysore and a sheristadar.

=== Literature and arts ===
- Appu Nedungadi, author of Kundalatha, the first novel published in Malayalam
- M.V. Dhurandhar FRSA, noted painter and postcard artist who was an alumnus of the Sir J.J. School of Art in Mumbai, where he was also later a professor

=== Philanthropy, religion and charity ===
- T. Rattinasami Nadar, founder of Nadar Mahajana Sangam efforts of T. Ratnasamy Nadar, in 1910. There are several schools and colleges under the control of Nadar Mahajana Sangam
- Ranchhodlal Chhotalal, textile mill pioneer and philanthropist
- Dharmarathnakara Arcot Narrainsawmy Mudaliar, philanthropist
- Amba Prasad, philanthropist of Delhi
- Salig Rām (1829–1898), Postmaster-General for North-Western Provinces; disciple of Shiv Dayal Singh, later succeeding him as guru. Often known by the honorific "Huzur Maharaj"
- Ranadaprasad Saha, philanthropist
- Yele Mallappa Shetty (1815–1887), philanthropist who constructed Bangalore's first obstetrics hospital, funded Vani Vilas Hospital construction, and restored Kaadu Malleshwara Temple, Bangalore. The name of the Yele Mallappa Shetty Lake commemorates his contribution to the construction of drought-relieving water storage in the Bangalore region
- Sardar Bahadur Jagat Singh (Sant) (1884–1951), Lyallpur, pre-partition Punjab Surat Shabd Yoga practitioner and guru
- Gubbi Thotadappa, businessman, philanthropist, founded Dharmachathra (free lodging places for travellers) and free hostels for students throughout Karnataka

=== Police and emergency services ===
- Tirath Singh Bakshi, Deputy Inspector General of Police, United Province
- Purna Chandra Lahiri, Indian Police officer, Calcutta
- P. K. Monnappa, South Indian Police Chief of three states, Madras, Hyderabad and Mysore.
- Jacob Devasahayam, Deputy Inspector General of Police, Madras
- Satyen Nath (S.N.) Mukherjee, First Indian-origin Deputy Commissioner of Indian Police, Calcutta

== See also ==
- Nawab Bahadur (disambiguation)
- Rai (Indian)
- Raj Ratna
