= DBPL Baradarha Thermal Power Station =

Coal-based power station

Coordinates: 21.910°N 83.184°E

DBPL Baradarha Thermal Power Station is a coal-based thermal power plant located in Baradarha in Janjgir-Champa district in the Indian state of Chhattisgarh. The power plant is operated by the Dainik Bhaskar Power Limited.

The coal for the plant is sourced from Dharamjaigarh coal block in Chhattisgarh. The Engineering, procurement and construction contract is given to Bharat Heavy Electricals.

== Capacity ==
It is a 1200 MW (2×600 MW) project.

Unit No.	Generating Capacity	Commissioned on	Status
1	600 MW	2014 February	Running
2	600 MW	2015 April	Running
