= Lingiyadih =

- Census town
- Location in Chhattisgarh, India Lingiyadih (India)
- Coordinates: 22.081909°N 82.179901°E
- Country: India
- State: Chhattisgarh
- District: Bilaspur

Population (2001)
  - Total: 15,769

Languages
  - Official: Hindi, Chhattisgarhi
- Time zone: UTC+5:30 (IST)
- Vehicle registration: CG

Lingiyadih is a census town in Bilaspur district in the Indian state of Chhattisgarh.

== Demographics ==
As of 2001 India census, Lingiyadih had a population of 15,769. Males constitute 51% of the population and females 49%. Lingiyadih has an average literacy rate of 65%, higher than the national average of 59.5%: male literacy is 73%, and female literacy is 57%. In Lingiyadih, 16% of the population is under six years of age.

Ligniyadih is satellite town of Bilaspur, which was once a village located just across Arpa River flowing across Bilaspur town.

For many years, there was a large brick-kiln owned by Mulji Jagmal Sawaria, who was also a major landholder with his brother Ranchhod Jagmal, had laid a private narrow gauge line in year 1935 for transportation of bricks across Arpa River over a railway-bridge built by him connecting kiln to his work office at Jagmal Chowk in Bilaspur. This railway line was dismantled in 1948.
