= Guchkuliya =

Guchkuliya is a small village situated 4 kilometres (2.5 mi) north-east from Jaijaipur tahsil in Janjgir-Champa district in the Indian state of Chhattisgarh.

== Geography ==
Guchkuliya is located at 21°51′47″ N 82°50′47″ E. It has an average elevation of 237 metres (778 ft).

== Demographics ==
As of 2001 Indian census, Guchkuliya had a population of 1093. Males constitute 49% of the population and females 51%. Guchkuliya has an average literacy rate of 58%, lower than the national average of 59.5%: male literacy is 68, and female literacy is 45%.
