= Nawagarh (Janjgir–Champa district) =

- Nagar panchayat
- Nickname: Nawagarhiya
- Location in Chhattisgarh, India Nawagarh (India)
- Coordinates: 21°51′12″N 82°39′41″E
- Country: India
- State: Chhattisgarh
- District: Janjgir-Champa

Nawagarh is a nagar panchayat in Janjgir–Champa, in the Indian state of Chhattisgarh.

According to the 2011 Indian census, the nagar panchayat had a population of more than 8,000, but 2025 estimates put this closer to 11,700. The municipality is divided into 15 electoral wards.
