= Akaltara Assembly constituency =

Legislative Assembly constituency in Chhattisgarh State, India

Coordinates: 22.03°N 82.42°E

Akaltara
- Constituency No. 33 for the Chhattisgarh Legislative Assembly

Constituency details
- Country: India
- Region: Central India
- State: Chhattisgarh
- District: Janjgir-Champa
- Lok Sabha constituency: Janjgir-Champa
- Established: 1956
- Total electors: 222,283
- Reservation: None

Member of Legislative Assembly
- 6th Chhattisgarh Legislative Assembly
- Incumbent Raghavendra Kumar Singh
- Party: Indian National Congress
- Elected year: 2023
- Preceded by: Saurabh Singh

Akaltara is one of the 90 Legislative Assembly constituencies of Chhattisgarh state in India. It is in Janjgir-Champa district. As of 2023, it is represented by Raghavendra Kumar Singh of the Indian National Congress party.

== Members of Legislative Assembly ==
Year	Member	Party
Madhya Pradesh Legislative Assembly
Prior to 1957: part of Akaltara-Masturi assembly constituency
1957	Thakur Bhuwan Bhaskar Singh	Indian National Congress
1962	Thakur Bhuwan Bhaskar Singh	Indian National Congress
1967	Ramgopal	Indian National Congress
1972	Rajendra Kumar Singh	Indian National Congress
1977	Rajendra Kumar Singh	Indian National Congress
1980	Dhirender Kumar Singh	Indian National Congress
1985	Rakesh Kumar Singh	Indian National Congress
1990	Jawahar Dubey	Independent politician
1993	Chhatram Devangan	Bharatiya Janata Party
1998	Chhatram Devangan	Bharatiya Janata Party
Chhattisgarh Legislative Assembly
2003	Ramadhar	Indian National Congress
2008	Saurabh Singh	Bahujan Samaj Party
2013	Chunnilal Sahu	Indian National Congress
2018	Saurabh Singh	Bharatiya Janata Party
2023	Raghavendra Kumar Singh	Indian National Congress

== Election results ==
=== Assembly Election 2023 ===
2023 Chhattisgarh Legislative Assembly election : Akaltara
Party	Candidate	Votes	%	±%
INC	Raghavendra Kumar Singh	80,043	47.30%	▲29.25
BJP	Saurabh Singh	57,285	33.85%	▼5.63
JCC	Richa Ajit Jogi	16,464	9.73%	New
BSP	Dr. Vinod Sharma	5,774	3.41%	▼34.86
AAP	Anand Prakash Miri	4,826	2.85%	▲2.23
Independent	Varsha Netam	1,334	0.79%	New
NOTA	None of the Above	897	0.53%	▼0.93
Margin of victory		22,758	13.45%	▲12.24
Turnout		1,69,221	76.56%	▲0.65
Registered electors		2,22,283		▲9.47
INC gain from BJP		Swing	▲7.82	

=== Assembly Election 2018 ===
2018 Chhattisgarh Legislative Assembly election : Akaltara
Party	Candidate	Votes	%	±%
BJP	Saurabh Singh	60,502	39.48%	▲4.66
BSP	Richa Jogi	58,648	38.27%	▲26.78
INC	Chunnilal Sahu	27,667	18.05%	▼32.61
NOTA	None of the Above	2,242	1.46%	▼1.10
Independent	Badri Prasad Ogrey	971	0.63%	New
AAP	Chandrahas Dewangan	958	0.63%	New
Margin of victory		1,854	1.21%	▼14.64
Turnout		1,53,254	76.63%	▲0.79
Registered electors		2,03,052		▲10.79
BJP gain from INC		Swing	▼11.19	

=== Assembly Election 2013 ===
2013 Chhattisgarh Legislative Assembly election : Akaltara
Party	Candidate	Votes	%	±%
INC	Chunnilal Sahu	69,355	50.67%	▲20.11
BJP	Dinesh Singh	47,662	34.82%	▲4.93
BSP	Santan Lal Ratre	15,720	11.48%	▼21.63
NOTA	None of the Above	3,503	2.56%	New
Independent	Gauri Bai Nayak	1,552	1.13%	New
GGP	Rajkumari Dhruw	977	0.71%	▼0.81
Margin of victory		21,693	15.85%	▲13.29
Turnout		1,36,884	76.60%	▲6.24
Registered electors		1,83,279		▲11.09
INC gain from BSP		Swing	▲17.55	

=== Assembly Election 2008 ===
2008 Chhattisgarh Legislative Assembly election : Akaltara
Party	Candidate	Votes	%	±%
BSP	Saurabh Singh	37,393	33.11%	▲14.45
INC	Chunnilal Sahu	34,505	30.56%	▼1.16
BJP	Chhatram Dewangan	33,752	29.89%	▼0.61
Independent	Satish Kant	2,130	1.89%	New
GGP	Rajkumari Dhruw	1,723	1.53%	▲0.24
Independent	Ramkumar	949	0.84%	New
SP	Basant Kumar Kurre	823	0.73%	New
Margin of victory		2,888	2.56%	▲1.34
Turnout		1,12,926	68.48%	▼3.29
Registered electors		1,64,988		▲0.44
BSP gain from INC		Swing	▲1.40	

=== Assembly Election 2003 ===
2003 Chhattisgarh Legislative Assembly election : Akaltara
Party	Candidate	Votes	%	±%
INC	Ramadhar	37,368	31.71%	New
BJP	Chhatram Dewangan	35,938	30.50%	New
BSP	Durga Charan	21,990	18.66%	New
NCP	Laxman Prasad	12,843	10.90%	New
Independent	Bhagwat Prasad Sahu	3,576	3.03%	New
GGP	Nehal	1,520	1.29%	New
Independent	Kuldeep Patle	1,459	1.24%	New
Margin of victory		1,430	1.21%	
Turnout		1,17,828	71.75%	
Registered electors		1,64,259		
INC win (new seat)				

== See also ==
- List of constituencies of the Chhattisgarh Legislative Assembly
- Janjgir-Champa district
