= Sanjari, Janjgir-Champa =

Sanjari
- village
- Country: India
- State: Chhattisgarh
- District: Janjgir–Champa
- Tehsil: Malkharoda

Government
  - Body: Village panchayat
- Time zone: UTC+5:30 (IST)
- Vehicle registration: CG

Sanjari is a village in Malkharoda tehsil, Janjgir–Champa district, Chhattisgarh, India.

In the fiscal year 2000-2001 fifteen wells were dug or drilled in Sanjari village, and nine of them were hooked up to a water system for irrigation.
