= Akaltara railway station =

Railway station in Chhattisgarh

Akaltara

General information
- Location: Station Road, Akaltara, Janjgir–Champa district, Chhattisgarh; India
- Coordinates: 22.0291°N 82.4224°E
- Elevation: 108 metres (354 ft)
- System: Indian Railways station
- Owner: Indian Railways
- Operator: Bilaspur railway division
- Platforms: 4
- Tracks: 4
- Connections: Auto stand

Construction
- Structure type: Standard (on ground station)
- Parking: yes
- Cycle facilities: No
- Accessible: Disabled access

Other information
- Status: Functioning
- Station code: AKT
- Fare zone: South East Central Railway
Location
- Location within India Location within Chhattisgarh

Akaltara Railway Station is a small railway station in Janjgir–Champa district, Chhattisgarh. Its code is AKT. It serves Akaltara city. The station consists of two platforms. The platforms are not well sheltered. It lacks facilities of sanitation. Akaltara is a station on the Tatanagar–Bilaspur section of Howrah–Nagpur–Mumbai line.

== Major trains ==
- South Bihar Express
