= KSK Mahanadi Power Project =

Thermal power plant in Chhattisgarh, India

Coordinates: 21.961°N 82.415°E

The KSK Mahanadi Power Project is a coal-powered thermal power plant located in Chhattisgarh, India. As of 2025, it is owned and operated by JSW Energy.

== Project description ==
The power plant is located at Nariyara village in Akaltara tehsil of Janjgir-Champa district, in the Indian state of Chhattisgarh. The approved capacity of the plant is 3,600 MW (6×600 MW). The engineering, procurement, and construction contract was awarded to SEPCO of China.

The company has long-term coal-supply arrangements with the Gujarat Mineral Development Corporation and the Goa Industrial Development Corporation from the Morga-II and Gare Pelma-II coal blocks, respectively. It has also been allocated tapering linkage arrangements with Coal India. However, the Supreme Court judgment of 2014 on the coal scam case led to a cancellation of all allocations.

== Progress ==
The project includes six units, at 600 MW each. Three of the six units have been commissioned so far.

Unit no.	Generating capacity	Commission date	Status
1	600 MW	May 2013	Running
2	600 MW	August 2014	Running
3	600 MW	January 2018	Running
4	600 MW	...	...
5	600 MW	...	...
6	600 MW	...	...

== Present status ==
The company is facing major issues, and financial institutions have begun the process of finding a suitable buyer for the project. Apart from seeking investors, lenders also plan to change the management of a subsidiary that is implementing the raw water intake system for the project, and that of an associate developing the railway siding outside the plant boundary.

The company reported revenues of only Rs. 200 million (US$3 million) in the 2017 fiscal year, which is negligible if 1,200 MW of production capacity was operational during that year. The single reason for non-operation is the non-availability of coal. In 2014, the Supreme Court of India cancelled wholesale all coal allocations made since 1993 by the government of India, which has held a monopoly on coal mining since nationalization in the 1950s.

In 2025, KSK Mahanadi Power Limited, which previously operated the project, was acquired by the public energy company JSW Energy.
