= Janjgir =

- City
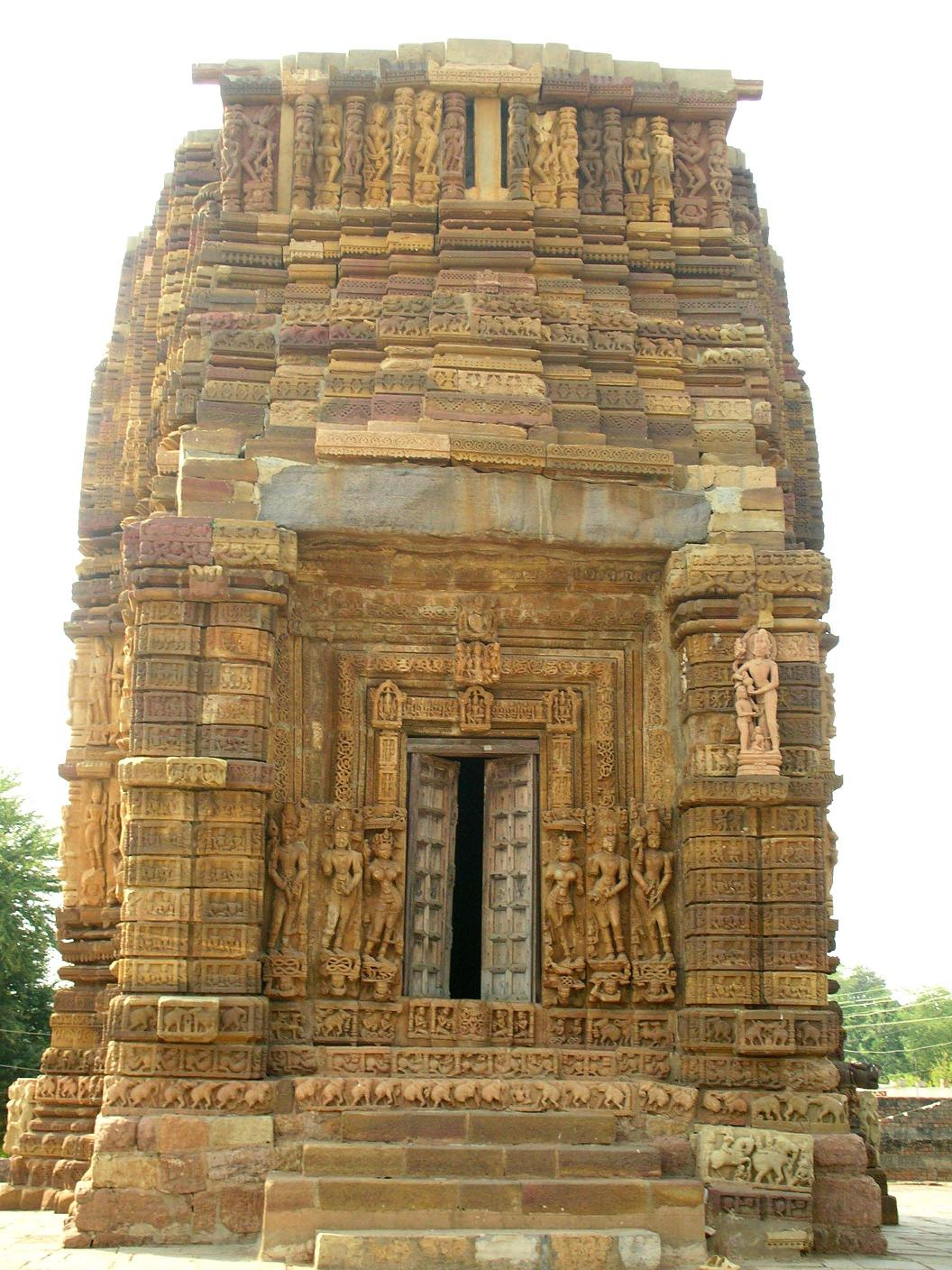
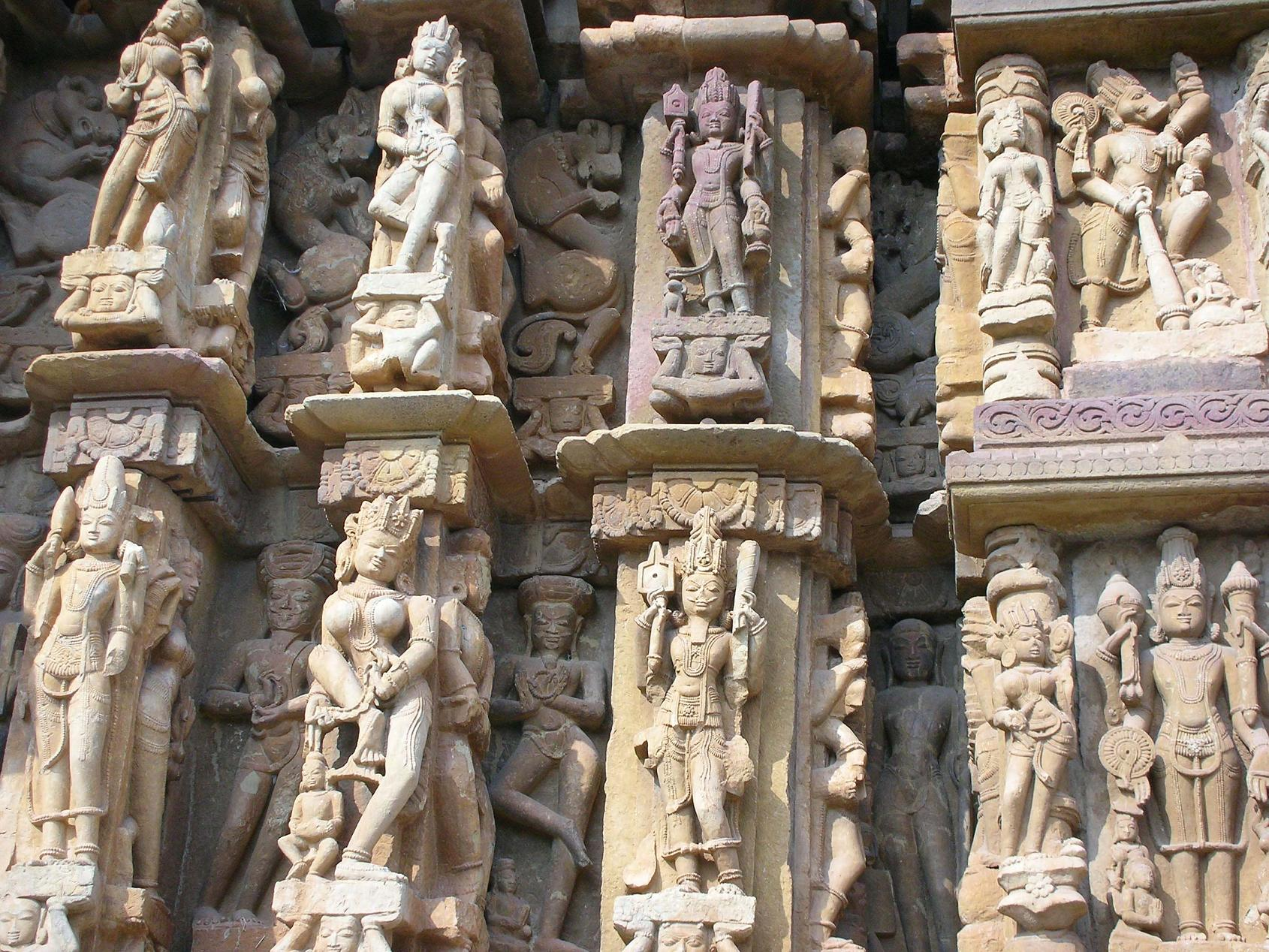
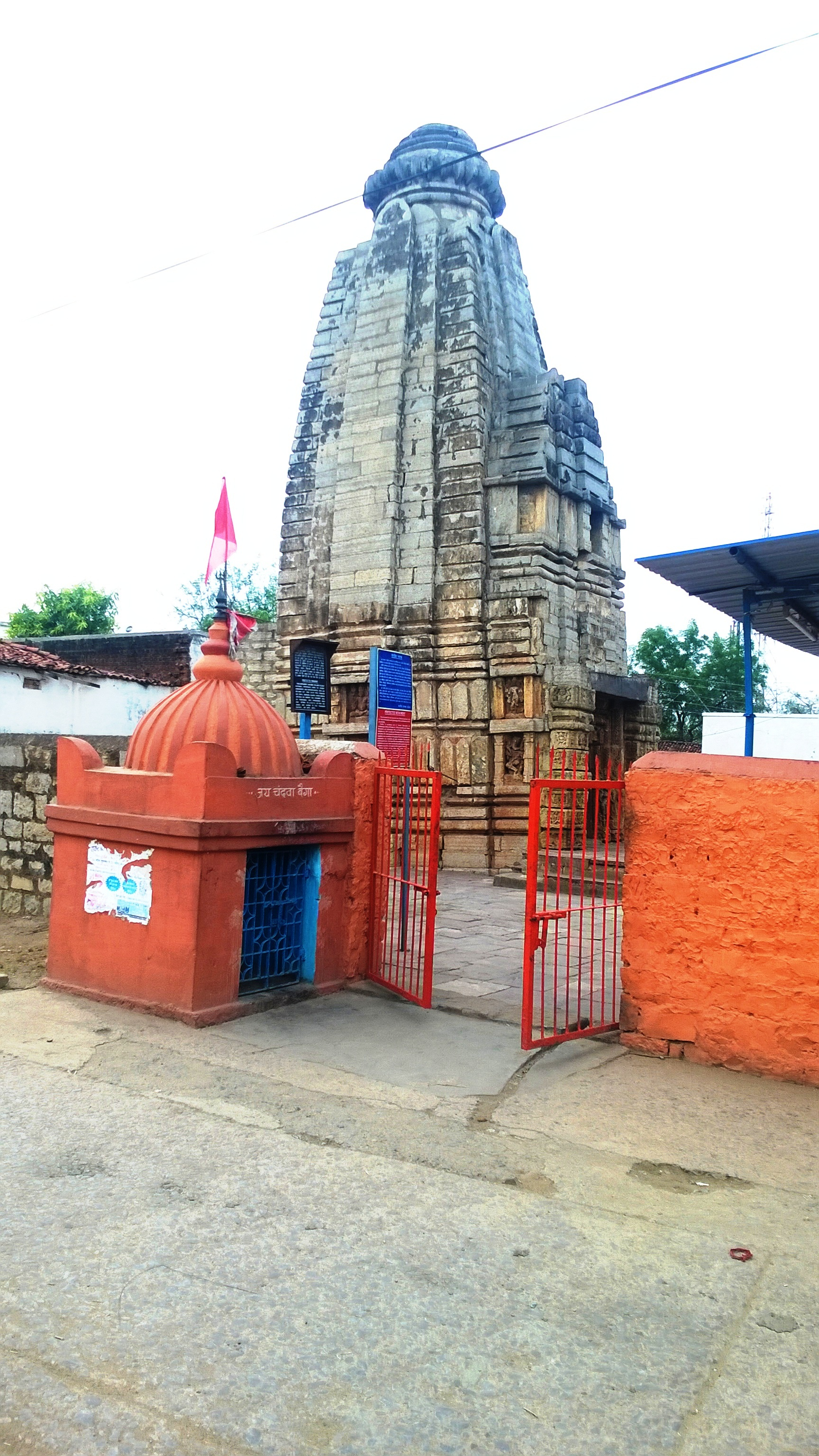
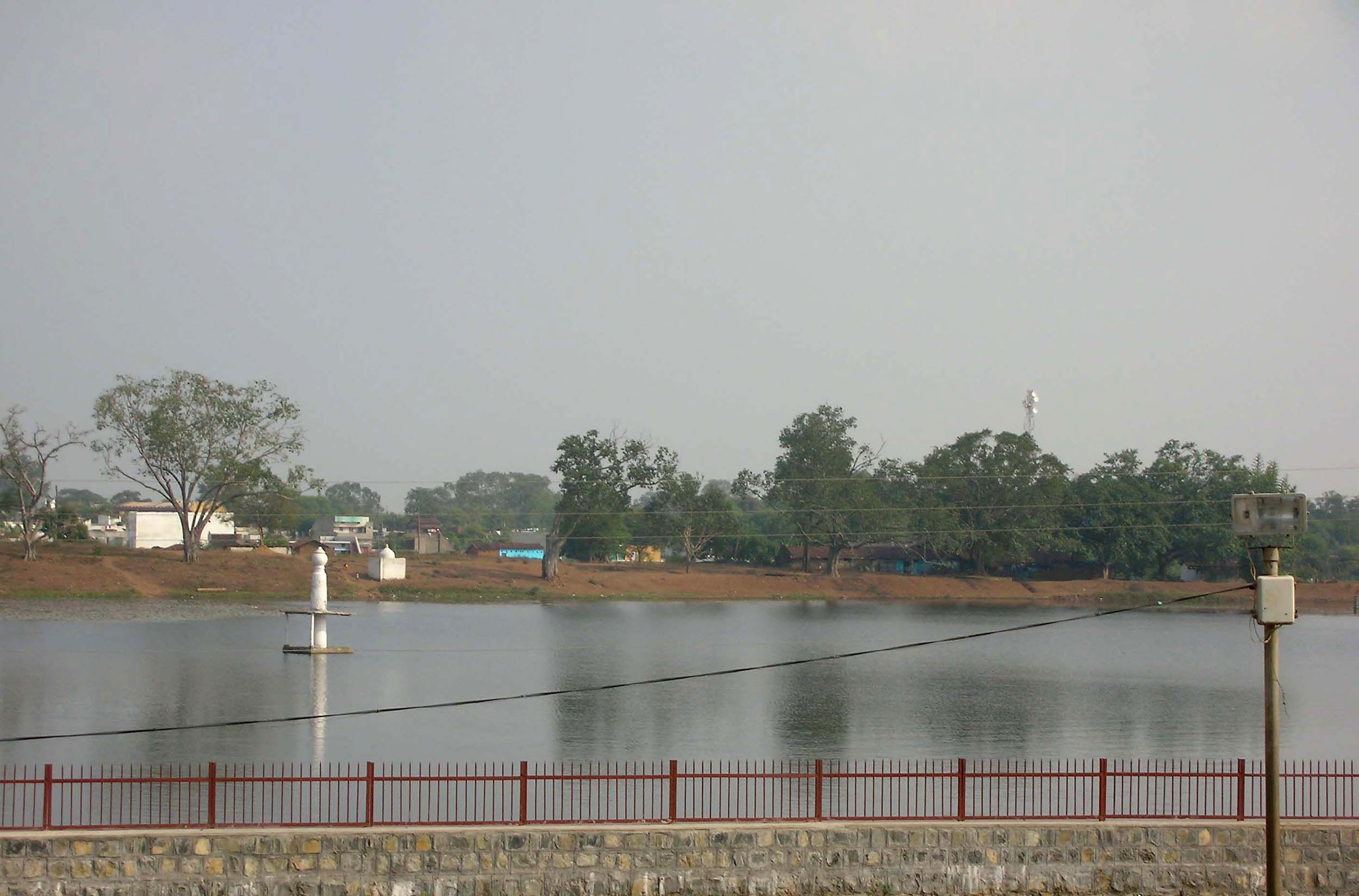
- From top, left to right: Ancient 12th century Vishnu temple (incompleted structure), Intricate sculpture, small vishnu temple beside it, Bhima Talab Janjgir.

- Location in Chhattisgarh, India Janjgir (India)
- Coordinates: 22.017°N 82.567°E
- Country: India
- State: Chhattisgarh
- District: Janjgir–Champa

Population (2011)
  - Total: 40,561

Languages
  - Official: Hindi, Chhattisgarhi
- Time zone: UTC+5:30 (IST)
- PIN: 495668
- Telephone code: 07817
- Vehicle registration: CG-11
- Nearest city: Bilaspur, Korba
- Literacy: 73%
- Website: janjgir-champa.nic.in

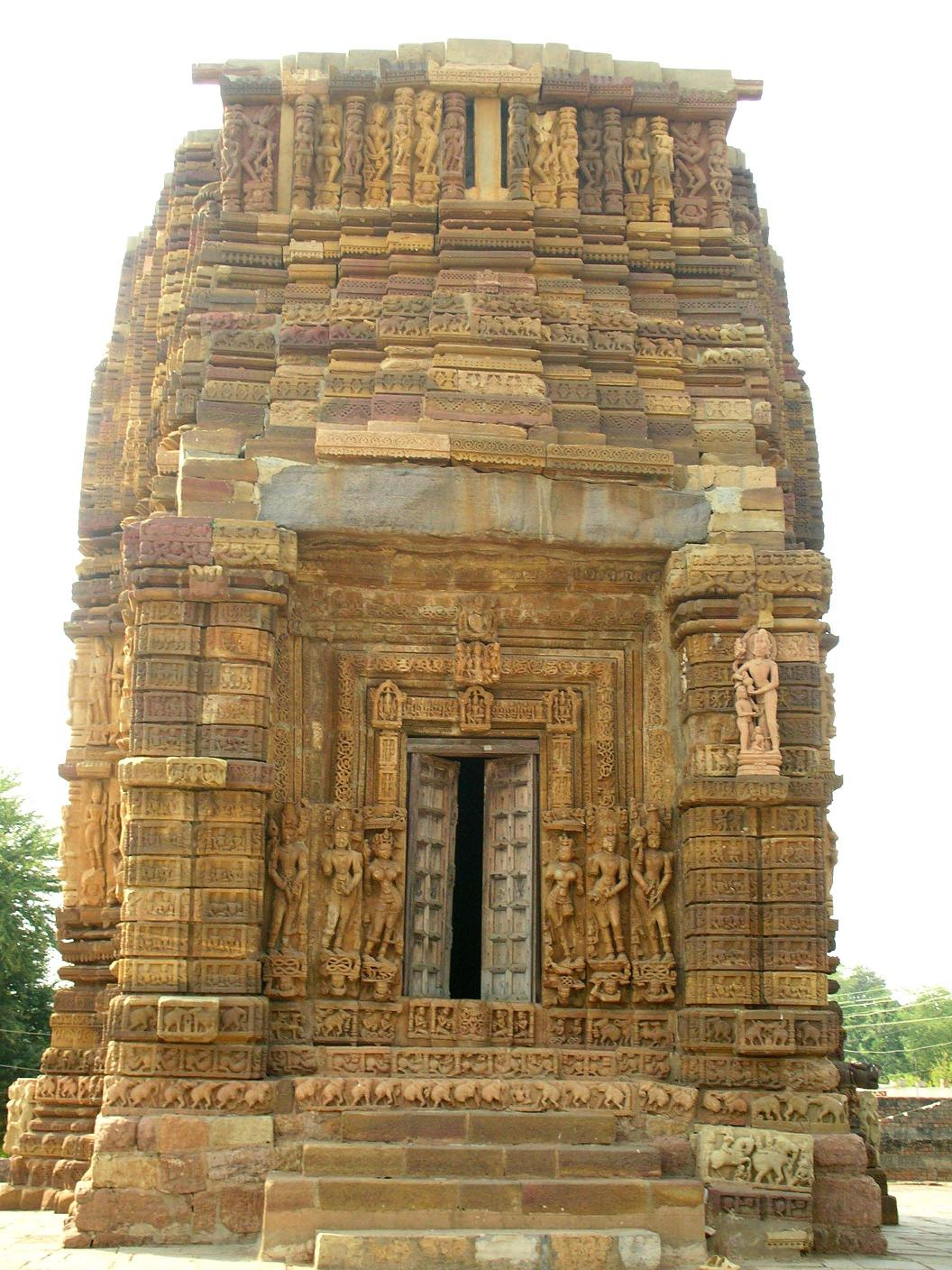
Vishnu Mandir, Janjgir.

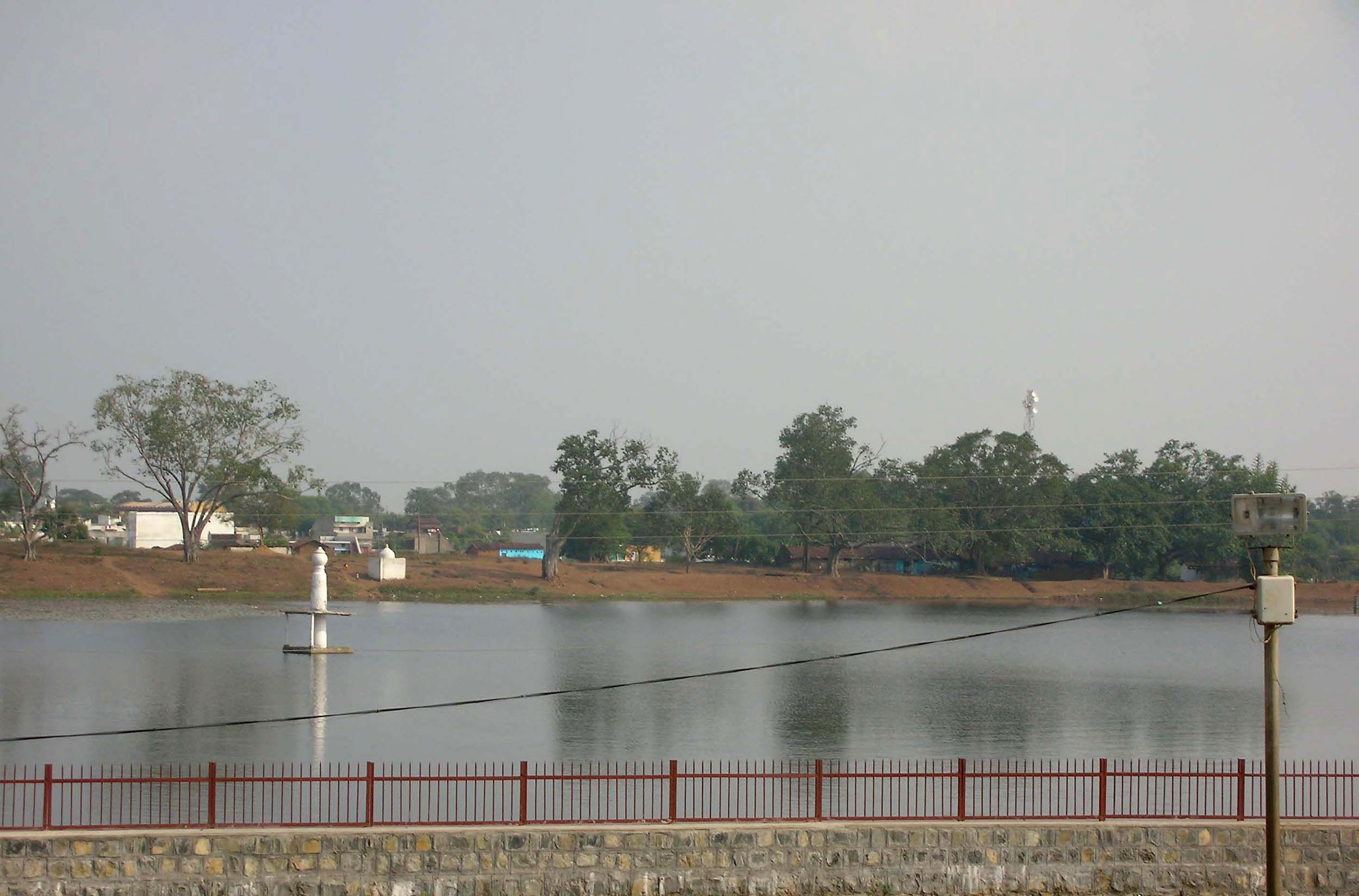
Bhima Talab, Janjgir

Janjgir is the headquarters of the Janjgir–Champa district in Chhattisgarh, India. It has been the district headquarters since 25 May 1998, when Janjgir–Champa was carved out of Bilaspur.

Well known for its Vishnu Temple aka Nakta Mandir, Janjgir is undergoing rapid industrial development and will become home to various thermal power plants in the coming years.

After several attempts made by the people to adopt the name Janjgir, the railway station name changed from Naila to Janjgir-Naila. Janjgir is well connected by railways and roads and is connected to major cities like Bilaspur and Raipur through National Highway 200.

== Demographics ==
As of 2001 India census, Janjgir had a population of 32,495. Males constitute 52% of the population and females 48%. Janjgir has an average literacy rate of 70%, higher than the national average of 59.5%: male literacy is 59%, and female literacy is 60%. In Janjgir, 14% of the population is under 6 years of age.

The city has a multicultural mix of locals and people that have migrated from Sindh (Pakistan), Punjab, Uttar Pradesh, Bihar, Madhya Pradesh, Rajasthan, Bengal, Andhra Pradesh, Maharashtra and Gujarat, etc. The main languages spoken are Chhattisgarhi and Hindi, while Sindhi and English are spoken by only a few.

== Transportation ==
Janjgir is a connected with SEC railway and its railway station is Janjgir-Naila. It is well connected to the rest of the country through the Indian Railways. The station is on the main Mumbai-Kolkata (Calcutta) rail line with daily connections to Mumbai, Kolkata, Pune, Nagpur, Puri, Vishakhapattnam and Ahmedabad. It is also the originating station for daily trains to:

- Gondwana Express (From Champa Jn.)
- Chhattisgarh Express, Korba-Vishakhapattnam Express
- Utkal Express, Ahmadabad Express, Shalimar Express
- Shivnath Express, Trivendram Express (2 days)

=== Details about railway stations ===
There are 5 railway station in Janjgir listed below with approximate distance from the District Headquarters

• Janjgir-Naila 5 km
• Champa 9 km
• Akaltara 16 km
• Baradwar 25 km
• Sakti 40 km

The city is connected with Mumbai and Kolkata via Bilaspur, Raipur through the National Highway network. Janjgir is on NH-200 connecting Raipur and Raigarh on either side. Three-wheeled, black and yellow auto rickshaws, referred to as autos, are a popular form of transport. They can accommodate up to eight passengers. Local transportation also includes man-powered cycle rickshaws, horse-drawn Tongas. There are regular buses and taxis to all nearby towns and cities. Janjgir aerodrome is Khokharabhatta, 5 km away. It is not served by any scheduled airlines.

== See also ==
- Janjgir–Champa
- Janjgir Naila
- Champa
