= Janjgir Naila railway station =

Railway station in Chhattisgarh

Janjgir Naila

General information
- Location: Janjgir, Chhattisgarh; India
- Coordinates: 22.0229°N 82.5654°E
- Elevation: 273 metres (896 ft)
- System: Indian Railways station
- Owner: Indian Railways
- Operator: South East Central Railway
- Platforms: 4
- Tracks: 7 (double electrified broad gauge)
- Connections: Auto stand

Construction
- Structure type: Standard (on-ground station)
- Parking: Yes
- Cycle facilities: Yes

Other information
- Status: Functioning
- Station code: NIA
- Zone(s): South East Central Railway
- Division(s): Bilaspur
Location

Janjgir Naila railway station is the railway station for Janjgir Naila city, the district headquarters of Janjgir-Champa district, Chhattisgarh, India. Its code is NIA. The station has four platforms which are not well sheltered. The station is on the Tatanagar–Bilaspur section of Howrah–Nagpur–Mumbai line with daily connections to Mumbai, Kolkata, Pune, Nagpur, Puri, Visakhapatnam Tatanagar Raipur and Ahmedabad. The station is 6 km from Janjgir collectorate.

== Major trains ==
The following trains run from Janjgir Naila railway station:

- Ahmedabad–Howrah SF Express
- Bilaspur–Tatanagar Passenger
- Bilaspur–Gevra Road Passenger (unreserved)
- Bilaspur–Gevra Road MEMU
- Bilaspur–Jharsuguda Passenger (unreserved)
- Bilaspur–Raigarh MEMU
- Bilaspur–Raigarh MEMU
- Gondia–Jharsuguda Passenger (unreserved)
- Gondia–Raigarh Jan Shatabdi Express
- Itwari–Tatanagar Jn Passenger
- Kalinga Utkal Express
- Korba–Raipur MEMU
- Korba–Thiruvananthapuram Central SF Express
- Korba–Visakhapatnam Express
- Shalimar–Lokmanya Tilak Terminus Express
- Wainganga SF Express
