= Kailash Chandra Bose =

Indian doctor

Rai Bahadur, Sir Kailash Chandra Bose CIE, OBE
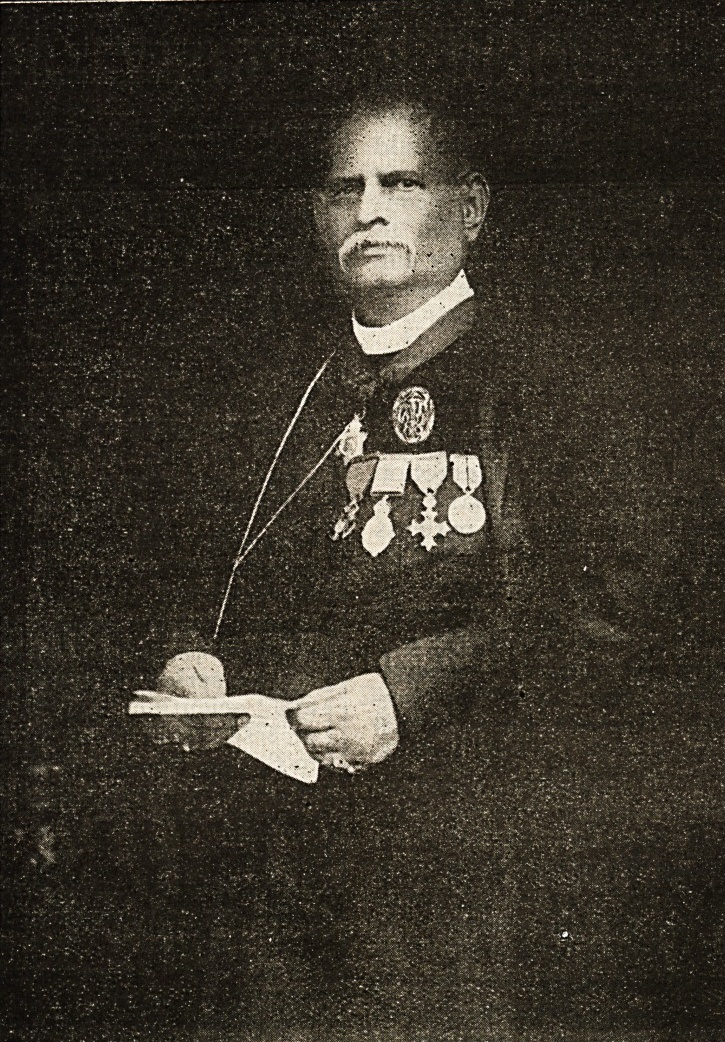
- Born: Kailash Chandra Bose; 26 December 1850; Calcutta, Bengal Presidency, British India
- Died: 19 January 1927 (aged 76); Calcutta, Bengal Presidency, British India
- Education: Calcutta Medical College
- Occupation: Physician
- Title: Rai Bahadur, Sir

Sir Kailash Chandra Bose (26 December 1850 – 19 January 1927) was an Indian medical practitioner who was one of the first Indian physicians to be knighted.

== Early life ==
Kailash Chandra Bose was the second son of Babu Madhusudan Bose, a member of a famous Bose family of Simla, resident of Calcutta (now Kolkata) and was born on 26 December 1850. His father and members of his family were the pioneer of steamship communication on the river Hoogly, were well known in commercial circles but also distinguished for the patronage of Science and literature. After passing through school with considerable distinction Kailash Chandra entered the Calcutta Medical College from where he graduated in the University of Calcutta in 1874.

== Career ==
At first he entered government service as Resident Medical Officer Campbell Hospital Calcutta. But he was persuaded by a brother to leave government service and set up as a private practitioner. Within two years he had secured in Calcutta a brilliant reputation and had established a lucrative practice especially among the Marwari community. It was not long before he was recognized as the leading Indian medical practitioner in Bengal.

== Social activities ==
He was the instrumental in the establishment of Calcutta Medical School, Sodepur Pinjarapole. He also collected funds for the establishment of Veterinary College and Hospital and School of Tropical Medicine in Calcutta.

== Awards and honours ==
He was President of Calcutta Medical Society, vice-president of the first Indian Medical Congress, Commissioner of Calcutta Municipality now Kolkata Municipal Corporation in 1899. He was created a Rai Bahadur in 1895. In recognition of his valuable services to Bengal he was further created a Companion of the Indian Empire (CIE), in 1900 and a fellow of the University of Calcutta for 1904 onwards. His public work was recognized by the award of the "Kaiser-i-Hind" gold medal in 1910, and in 1916, he was knighted, being the first Indian doctor to receive this honour. Amongst other honours which fell to him were the Order of the British Empire (OBE) in 1918.
