= P. K. Monnappa =

Police officer

Rao Bahadur P. K. Monnappa
- Pemmanda K. Monnappa
- Born: Kodagu (Coorg), India
- Resting place: Bangalore
- Relatives: P. M. Belliappa, IAS (son)
- Police career
- Allegiance: Indian Imperial Police (I.P), India
- Department: Madras, Hyderabad, Mysore,
- Rank: I.G.P. (then police chief in 3 states)

Rao Bahadur Pemmanda K. Monnappa (P.K. Monappa, IPS) was Karnataka's first police chief. He served in three Southern states, Madras (before its disintegration), Hyderabad (Andhra Pradesh), and Mysore (Karnataka), at different times. However, he is to be best remembered for his contributions towards integrating Hyderabad into the Union. Monnappa had a career in Public Service reflected by his titles and medals.

== Biography ==
P. K. Monnappa was born and brought up in Kodagu, India. He joined as a Police Inspector in Madras service in the 1920s and served at various levels until he became Inspector-General of Police in Madras province in 1948. Those days Andhra Pradesh was divided between the British Indian province of Madras and the princely state of Hyderabad. He was made Inspector-General of Police, the highest position in the police of Hyderabad State, after Operation Polo. He had served the regions of Kurnool and Guntur in Andhra Pradesh. Monnappa was instrumental in suppressing the Razakars rebellion in Andhra Pradesh as the Inspector-General of Police. The then Union Home Minister, Sardar Vallabbhai Patel, had chosen Monnappa to quell the mutiny in Hyderabad.

He became the Inspector-General of Andhra state in 1953 and of Mysore from 1956. Later, after the reorganisation of the States in the country in 1956, Monnappa became the first Inspector General of Police of Karnataka State, which was then called the Mysore State, under the S. Nijalingappa government. He was a disciplined and efficient administrator known for his simplicity and integrity. Monnappa became an inspiration for generations of police officers. By the year 1959, he retired from police service.

== Title ==
Rao Bahadur (also Rai Bahadur; abbreviated R.B.) was a title of honour accompanied by a medal, issued in India during the era of British rule, to individuals who have performed great service to the nation. Known as Roy Bahadur in Bengal, Khan Bahadur among Muslims and Parsis, and Sardar Bahadur among Sikhs, it is the equivalent of an OBE (Order of the British Empire). Translated, "Rao" implies prince, and "Bahadur" means most honorable. Rao Sahib (also Rai Sahib) and Diwan Bahadur were other titles awarded by the Raj to Indians.

During the British Raj, Mr. Monnappa became a police inspector, was made an officer of the IP (Imperial Police) cadre, and eventually, he became the Director General of Police of Madras State. The Raj, in recognition of his meritorious service, conferred on him the title ‘Rao Saheb’, at first, and, later, ‘Rao Bahadur’.

== During Operation Polo ==
Operation Polo, code name for The Hyderabad Police Action [3][4], was a military operation in September 1948 in which the Indian armed forces engaged those of the State of Hyderabad and ended the rule of Nizam, annexing the state into the Indian Union. The operation took place after Nizam Osman Ali Khan Asif Jah VII decided not to join the princely State of Hyderabad to either India or Pakistan after the partition of India. The Nisam's defiance was backed by armed militias, known as Razakars, and had the moral support of Pakistan. After a stalemate in negotiations between the Nizam and India, and wary of a hostile independent state in the centre of India, Deputy Prime Minister Sardar Patel decided to annex the state of Hyderabad. He sent the Indian army and the Hyderabad State Forces were defeated within five days.

On the morning of 13 September 1948 five infantry battalions and an armoured regiment of the battle-hardened Indian Army under the command of Maj Gen J N Chaudhry entered the princely state of Hyderabad, over a year after Independence and after the patience of the new Indian Union was tested beyond endurance. The Nizam of Hyderabad, like the Maharaja of Jammu & Kashmir, too entertained notions of an independent state and had so far managed to avoid accession. In the meantime, the Nizam sought to widen the issue by moving the United Nations, took the advice and assistance of Pakistan, and began stockpiling arms. The Times in London reported on 9 August 1948 that the Hyderabad army was strengthened to 40,000 and supplies of arms were being received, presumably from Pakistan. The Prime Minister of Hyderabad Mir Laiq Ali boasted that if "the Indian government takes any action against Hyderabad, 100,000 men are ready to fight. We also have a hundred bombers in Saudi Arabia ready to bomb Bombay!".

Within the Nizam's realm, Razakars led by Kasim Razvi, had stepped up their campaign. On 16 September, faced with imminent defeat, the Nizam summoned Prime Minister Mir Laik Ali and requested his resignation by the morning of the following day. The resignation was delivered along with the resignations of the entire cabinet. On the noon of 17 September, a messenger brought a personal note from the Nizam to India's Agent General to Hyderabad, K.M. Munshi summoning him to the Nizam's office at 1600 hours. At the meeting, the Nizam stated "The vultures have resigned. I don't know what to do". Munshi advised the Nizam to secure the safety of the citizens of Hyderabad by issuing appropriate orders to the Commander of the Hyderabad State Army, Major General El Edroos. Munshi also suggested that the Nizam might make a broadcast welcoming the Indian "Police action" and withdrawing his complaint to the Security Council. Munshi explained and offered to help draft the speech. The speech was in English. Nobody bothered to translate it into Urdu. After the broadcast, the Nizam drove back to King Kothi Palace to brood. Major General El Edroos offered his surrender of the Hyderabad State Forces to Major General (later General and Army Chief) Joyanto Nath Chaudhuri at Secunderabad. Within five days the "police action", actually a military operation, was all but over. The Nizam received the ceremonial post of Rajpramukh (equivalent to a governor) in 1950 but resigned from this office when the states were re-organized in 1956.

Following the escape of Mir Laiq Ali after his resignation and Hyderabad's surrender, PK Monnappa, IP, then Inspector-General of Police from Madras State, had been specially brought in to replace BBS Jetley. Later he quelled the unrest that followed in the aftermath of Operation Polo when landlords who supported the Nizam terrorised the common people in Nalgonda in Hyderabad in around 1950 as police chief of Hyderabad under Home Minister Sardar Patel's command.

== During States' Reorganisation of Indian Union ==
In 1956 the reorganization of states was done in India on a linguistic basis. On the same lines, the Mysore state came into existence that year. Coorg (Kodagu) and the Kannada-speaking parts of Bombay (Belgaum, North Canara), Hyderabad (Bidar, Raichur, Bijapur, Bellary) and Madras (South Canara) were added to Mysore. The unified state police got a uniform dress code under Mysore Police.

Similarly, the Telugu-speaking parts of Hyderabad and Madras were brought together. At the time of India's independence, Hyderabad was the largest Indian princely state in terms of population and GNP. Its territory of 82,698 square miles (214,190 km^{2}) was more than that of England and Scotland put together. The 1941 census had estimated its population to be 16.34 million, over 85% of who were Hindus with Muslims accounting for about 12%. It was also a multi-lingual state consisting of people speaking Telugu (48.2%), Marathi (26.4%), Kannada (12.3%) and Urdu (10.3%).

At that time, Monnappa was made the first police chief of the newly formed state of Andhra Pradesh. Afterward, later in that same year(1956), he became the first police chief of Karnataka (then known as Mysore) as well. P.K. Monnappa was the State's first Inspector General of Police and also the State's first IP (Indian Imperial Police) Officer. He had also been the first Police Chief of the States of Madras and Hyderabad before his tenure in Mysore (Karnataka).

== Legacy ==
His residence was in Bangalore when he retired in 1958. Memorials have been built in Mr. Monnappa's memory in Chennai and Hyderabad. A Guest house and a hall have been planned in his memory in his birthplace Kodagu.

Legend has it that during his recruitment interview, which he attended dressed in the traditional Kodava-robed costume (the Kuppya Chele), the British officers were awed by his personality. In 1959-60, after his retirement, he served as President of the Kodava Samaja. Along with Field Marshal K.M. Cariappa he was instrumental in setting up the present Kodava Samaja, the forum of the Kodava (Coorg) community, building in Bangalore.

Later his son Pemmanda Monnappa Belliappa (P. M. Belliappa) became an IAS officer and was posted as a district officer in Tamil Nadu. He has settled down in Madras. He established the Pemmanda Monnappa scholarship fund in 2010 for South Indians studying at Cambridge University. For 2011, P. M. Belliappa was honored as Coorg person of the year. The daughter is Seethama (Lilly) Madappa married to Shri K.C.Madappa (I.A.S.) the first Kodava Secretary to the President of India under Dr.Neelam Sanjeeva Reddy. Ref: (kcmadappaias in Google)
