= Puttana Venkatramana Raju =

Civil engineer in the Indian Service of Engineers

Rao Bahadur Puttana Venkataramana Raju (ISE). BE(Hons), FIE(I). (1894-1975) was a civil engineer in the Indian Service of Engineers. His notable works include contributions to building the Dowleswaram Barrage, Prakasam Barrage and Madras Airport, roads and waterways. He received a Rao Bahadur award for his contributions to civil and hydraulics engineering and the development of engineering education.

== Career ==
He qualified for the Indian Service of Engineers in 1919, and engaged in many civil engineering projects with the Public Works Department.

During World War II, he was posted as ARP Special Engineer under the War Department, Govt. of India to develop Madras Airport from 1942-44. He was promoted to the position of Superintending Engineer in March 1944. He was subsequently conferred a Fellowship by the Institution of Engineers (India). He was a Member of the International Association for Hydraulic Research. He represented the Madras Govt. as their official delegate to several Indian Roads Congress meetings. He was appointed to the position of Consulting Engineer to the Government of India(Roads) in May 1942 and was later appointed as Industrial Adviser to the Government of India in April 1944.

=== Post-retirement ===
After retiring from the ISE, he took over as the Chief Engineer with the Simpsons Group.He was also a lecturer in Civil Engineering at the Madras University from 1939-40 under the Maharaja of Travancore-Curzon Endowment scheme. Later he took on the position of Dean of Engineering studies at Annamalai University He also served as the Chairman, Board of Examiners as well as a member of the Academic Senate, Syndicate and Academic Council and The Association of Principals and Technical Institutions.

== Recognition ==
Raju was honoured by the Government of India with the Rao Bahadur award for contributions to the fields of Civil & Hydraulics Engineering and the development of Engineering Education.

== Personal life ==
Puttana Venkataramana Raju married S G Pillamma Venkatamma.They had 4 sons and 4 daughters.
