= Tirath Singh Bakshi =

Indian police officer

Rai Bahadur Tirath Singh Bakshi (died 28 February 1948) was an Indian police officer who served in the United Province Police during the British Raj and later became Deputy Inspector General of Police.

== Career ==
Bakshi served in the police force of the United Provinces during British rule in India. He was associated with the capture of the dacoit Sultana, who was active in the Rohilkhand and Chambal regions. He was awarded the Indian Service Order by George V and later received the title Rai Bahadur.

== Later life and death ==
He later settled in Dholpur, in present-day Rajasthan. He later settled in Dholpur (now in Rajasthan). Adored by the citizens, who proudly called him Bubba Sahibor, he was responsible for bringing order to the Chambal Ravines. Singh died on 28 February 1948. and was buried in Dholpur.

== Family ==
Bakshi was the second son of S. Hoshiar Singh Bakshi and Chanan Devi.

His eldest son, Raghunath Singh Bakshi, was associated with Govind Vallabh Pant and was involved in the Indian independence movement. His second son, Sardar Ranbir Singh Bakshi, was a lawyer who later became a judge in Dholpur. He also served the Maharaja of Dholpur. After the independence of India, he moved to the Punjab and joined the Indian Administrative Service. He was the last Chief Secretary of Patiala and East Punjab States Union (PEPSU) and later served as Additional Chief Secretary of Punjab after the merger of PEPSU with Punjab. He subsequently returned to Patiala and served as chairman of the state's Public Service Commission.

His third son, Birander Singh Bakshi, also served in the police. His fourth son, Gurdit Singh Bakshi, was a police officer. His fifth son, Mohinder Singh Bakshi, was also a police officer and was sent to Sikkim on deputation as commissioner of police. He was also the officer in charge of transferring the Tenzin Gyatso's treasurers from Sikkim to India. His seventh son, Govind Singh Bakshi, also served in the police and resided in Patiala. His daughter, Amba Bakshi, married an army officer.
