= Naila-Janjgir =

City and municipality in Chhattisgarh, India

Coordinates: 22.0167°N 82.5667°E

Janjgir-Naila is a city and a municipality in Janjgir-Champa district in the Indian state of Chhattisgarh.

== Demographics ==
As per and as of the 2011 Indian census, Janjgir Naila had a population of approximately 45,000.

== Economy ==
Significant lead deposits are in the Janjgir area. Most of the city's workforce is involved in the agriculture industry or in rice or flour milling. There is also some presence in the chemical industry.

== Culture ==
The people of Janjgir adopt new trends and lifestyles. Janjgir is multicultural, as people from various parts of India have settled in the region. Traditional clothing includes colorful dresses and sarees worn with a Kardhani. In rural areas, women historically wore necklaces made of one-rupee coins, though the practice has diminished. Comical plays are popular in the area.

Janjgir is rich in its cultural heritage. Janjgir has its own dance styles, cuisine, and music. "Raut Nacha" (performed basically by the Yadav caste, this folk dance has won many awards at the state level) and the Panthi and Soowa dance styles.

== Religious places ==
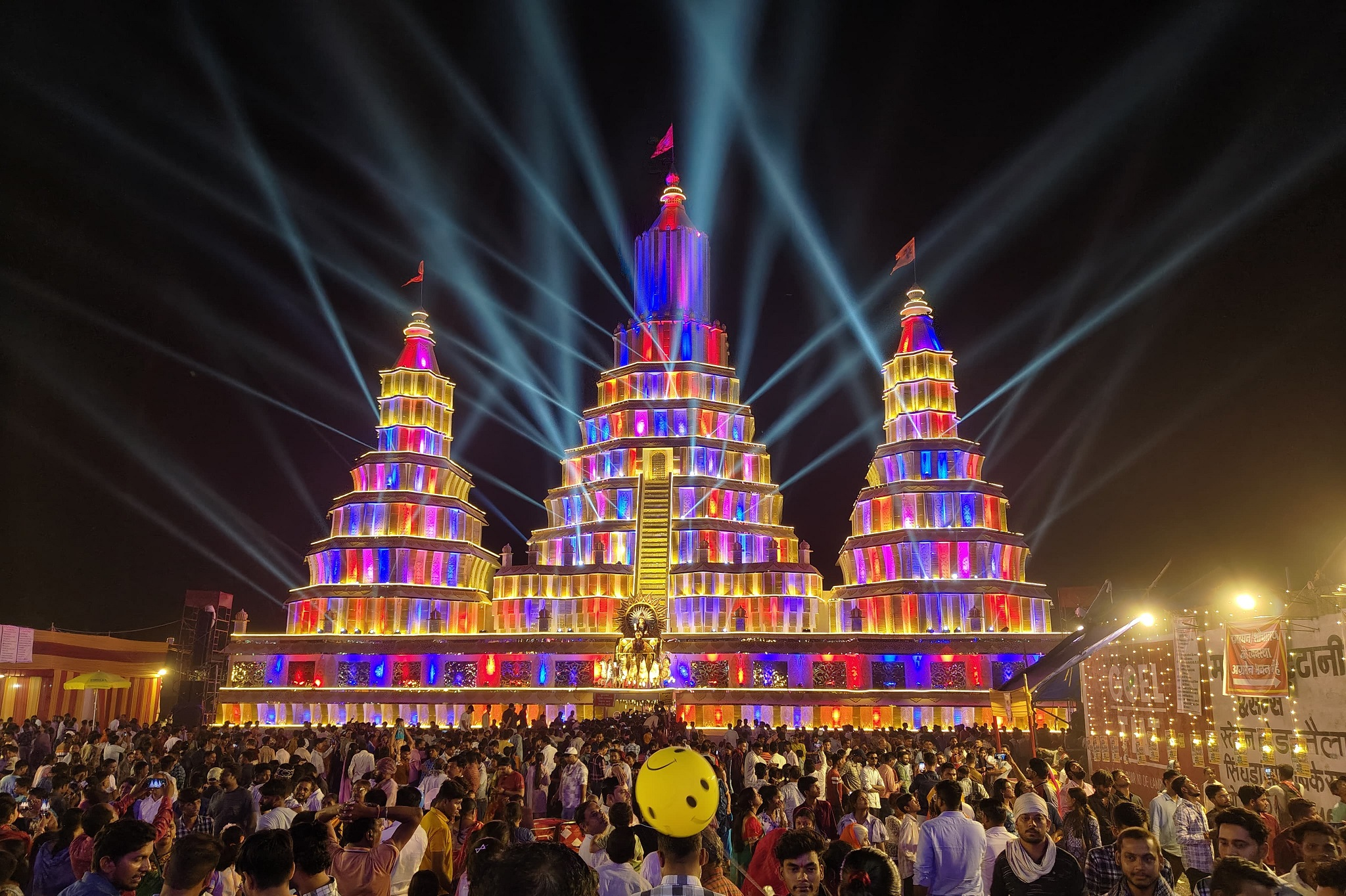
Janjgir-Naila's Durga Pandal of 2024 in Janjgir-Naila, inspired by the architecture and elegance of Thailand's temples

Vishnu Mandir was built by the kings of the Hayhay dynasty in the 12th century but did not complete it. The temple was built in two phases. The temple is an incomplete temple which can be seen near Bhima Talab. Lord Hanuman temple, formally called Nahariya Baba Dham, Manka Dai mandir, etc. is also in Janjgir.

Janjgir is known for its grand Durga Puja Pandal, which is a popular attraction during the annual Durga Puja celebrations. Each year, a theme-based pandal is constructed, drawing visitors from various parts of the state during Navaratri. The pandal is renowned for its elaborate designs and festive atmosphere, making it a significant cultural event in the region.

== Transportation ==
Janjgir Naila railway station is connected with SEC railway and its railway station is Naila. It is well connected to the rest of the country through the Indian Railways. The station is on the Tatanagar–Bilaspur section of Howrah-Nagpur-Mumbai line with daily connections to Mumbai, Kolkata, Pune, Nagpur, Puri, Vishakhapatnam and Ahmedabad. Some of the daily trains passing through this station are Chhattisgarh Express, Korba-Vishakhapattnam Express, Utkal Express, Ahmadabad Express, Shalimar Express, Shivnath Express, Trivandrum Express (2 Days), Tata-Itwari, Tata-BSP Express, Hasdeo Express, JanShatabdi Express, Shalimar Express, Wainganga Express etc.

Roadways

The city is connected with Mumbai and Kolkata via Bilaspur, and Raipur through the National Highway network. Janjgir is on NH-200 connecting Raipur and Raigarh on either side. Auto rickshaws are a popular form of transport. Local transportation also includes man-powered rickshaws, E-rickshaws, local buses, Petrol diesel ricksaws. There are regular buses and taxis to all nearby towns and cities.

Janjgir Aerodrome is in Khokharabhatta, 02 to 03 km away from the City, 5 to 6 km away from railway station.
