= Sarbarakar =

A Sarbarakar is an aristocrat from the Indian subcontinent. The term means 'Landlord, Debottar, Khamar, Society Activities' in Orissa States Agency. Typically hereditary, a Sarbarakar held tracts of land, engaged in social activities and exerted control over local peasants. A Sarbarakar had the right to collect taxes from the peasantry on behalf of imperial courts for military and social infrastructure.

Sarbarakar was a royal responsibility of landlords, They provided debottar (religious endowments supporting temples), Khamar (water endowments for society), Social Activities and Chief representative of princely states during the British Raj era. The Sarbarakar was also known as Malikana (Chief) and was in charge of revenue collection. They were loyal to the ruler and had to pay on the total revenue collected from the people.

== History ==
In Orissa States Agency during the Raj, the leading Sarbarakar was Fakira Charan Garnaik (1909-1969) of Hindol princely state. Sadhu Prasad Bidyadhar Mohapatra, Surendra Chaudhry, Chintamani Behera of Angul and Talcher were all Sarbarakar who were involved in the Indian independence movement during the British Raj era.

In 1939, the Sarbarakar returned to the princely state where the Prajamandal was still functioning. On their return, they found a revengeful attitude of the state administrator. In their absence and because of joining the Prajamandal against the existing Government, the lands and Sarbarakaries of some members were taken out by the British Raj. Some were heavily penalized by way of imprisonment, forfeiture of property and payment of fines.

== Reference Links ==
- Mishra, D. P. (1998). People's Revolt in Orissa: A Study of Talcher. Atlantic Publishers & Dist. pp. 150–151. ISBN 9788171567393.
- Nanda, Chandi Prasad (2008). Vocalizing Silence: Political Protests in Orissa, 1930-42. SAGE Publishing India. ISBN 9789352802500.
