= Akaltara =

- Town
- Location in Chhattisgarh, India Akaltara (India)
- Coordinates: 22.02°N 82.43°E
- Country: India
- State: Chhattisgarh
- District: Janjgir-Champa
- Elevation: 283 m (928 ft)

Population (2010)
  - Total: 21,333

Languages
  - Official: Hindi, Chhattisgarhi
- Time zone: UTC+5:30 (IST)
- PIN: 495552
- Telephone code: 917817
- Vehicle registration: CG 11

Akaltara is a nagar palika and tehsil in Janjgir-Champa district in the state of Chhattisgarh, India. It is the birthplace of a great freedom fighter Thakur Chhedi Lal (Barrister). Akaltara has a member in legislation assembly of Chhattisgarh state, which is now represented by Mr. Raghavendra Singh sisodiya of the congress. It is under Janjgir Parliament seat.

== Geography ==
Akaltara is located at 22.02°N 82.43°E. It has an average elevation of 283 metres (928 feet). It is situated in middle of Mahanadi Basin. 28 km eastward from Bilaspur and 17 km westward from Janjgir. Akaltara is on the bottom of Dalha hill. With an elevation of about 294.4 meter from the sea surface, the Janjgir-Champa district of Chhattisgarh spans over a total land area of 446,674 hectares. Bounded by Korba, Raigarh and Bilaspur, Janjgir-Chmapa district is famous for its high agricultural yield.

== Demographics ==
As of 2010 India census, Akaltara had a population of 21,333. Males constitute 52% of the population and females 48%. Akaltara has an average literacy rate of 69%, higher than the national average of 59.5%; with 59% of the males and 41% of females literate. 14% of the population is under 6 years of age.

== Industries ==
Akaltara is famous for limestone and rice mills. Many crushers and rice mills are spread around city. CCI Akaltara and Nuvoco Vistas Corp. Ltd. Arasmeta are cement plants of Akaltara. KSK Energy Ventures Ltd is constructing KSK Mahanadi Power Project a 3600 MW thermal power plant at Nariyara village in Akaltara. There Is Vardha Power Plant Created 2010 & Work Is Still In Progress.

== Transport ==
Akaltara is a station on the Tatanagar–Bilaspur section of Howrah-Nagpur-Mumbai line.

== Tehsil ==
Akaltara is one of nine blocks in Janjgir-Champa District. There are 52.5 villages in Akaltara Block. Villages of Akaltara 1. Aarasmeta 2. Akaltari 3. Amartal 4. Amlipali 5. Amora 6. Arjuni 7. Bamhani 8. Banahil 9. Bargawan 10. Barpali 11. Bhaistara 12. Birkoni 13. Buchihardi 14. Changori 15. Farhada 16. Hardi 17. Jhalmala 18. Kalyanpur 19. Kapan 20. Karumahu 21. Katghari 22. Katnai 23. Khatola 24. Khisora 25. Khond 26. Kirari 27. Kotgarh 28. Kotmi Sonar 29. Latiya 30. Madhuwa 31. Mahmadpur 32. Murlidih 33. Nariyara 34. Pachari 35. Padariya 36. Pakariya (jhulan) 37. Pakariya (latiya) 38. Parsada 39. Parsahibana 40. Parsahinala 41. Piparda 42. Piparsatti 43. Pondidalla 44. Pouna 45. Raseda 46. Sajapali 47. Sankar 48. Sonadula 49. Sonsari 50. Taga 51. Taroud 52. Tilai
