= Saurabh Singh (Chhattisgarh politician) =

Indian politician

Member of Chhattisgarh Legislative Assembly for Akaltara
- In office 11 December 2018 – 3 December 2023
- Preceded by: Chunnilal Sahu, INC
- Succeeded by: Raghavendra Singh, INC
- In office 8 December 2008 – 8 December 2013
- Preceded by: Chatram Dewangan, BJP
- Succeeded by: Chunnilal Sahu, INC

Personal details
- Born: 25 July 1974 (age 51) Bilaspur, Madhya Pradesh, India (now in Chhattisgarh, India)
- Party: Bharatiya Janata Party (November 2014–present)
- Other political affiliations: Bahujan Samaj Party (2008-2013); Indian National Congress (2013-2014)
- Spouse: Aarti Singh
- Children: 2
- Profession: Politician

Saurabh Singh (born 25 July 1974) is an Indian politician and former member of Legislative Assembly of Akaltara. He is a member of Bharatiya Janata Party.

== Political career ==
Singh first contested the 2008 assembly election from Akaltara on Bahujan Samaj Party's ticket and won. In July 2013, Saurabh left Bahujan Samaj Party. He joined Indian National Congress in 2013 and left in 2014. He joined Bharatiya Janata Party in 2014 and contested the 2018 assembly election on BJP ticket and was again elected as MLA by defeating Richa Jogi (daughter in law of former CM Ajit Jogi).
