= Jairamnagar =

Town and railway station in Chhattisgarh, India

Coordinates: 22.034°N 82.296°E

Jairamnagar is a town and a railway station also named after that town. It is about 4.9 kilometers (3 miles) from Masturi and about 14 kilometers (8.7 miles) from Bilaspur, Chhattisgarh. The station code is JRMG.

== History ==
On 1 September 1939, the Bengal Nagpur Railway re-named it after Rai Bahadur Jairam Valji Chauhan, a notable Kutchi railway contractor. Jairamnagar is the only railway station in India named after a businessman. The town was known as Paragaht before its 1939 renaming. Rai Bahadur Jairam Valji Chauhan was once the sole proprietor of the Jairamnagar village; he owned mining sites of dolomite, manganese, and limestone.

== Demographics and economy ==
Jairamnagar has a large pond, previously a limestone quarry, that belonged to Rai Bahadur Jairam Valji Chauhan. The pond's water is used by locals for daily needs such as cooking, washing, and bathing. A Shivalinga, built in 1922 by Jairam Valji Chauhan.
