= Champa, Chhattisgarh =

Champa
- city
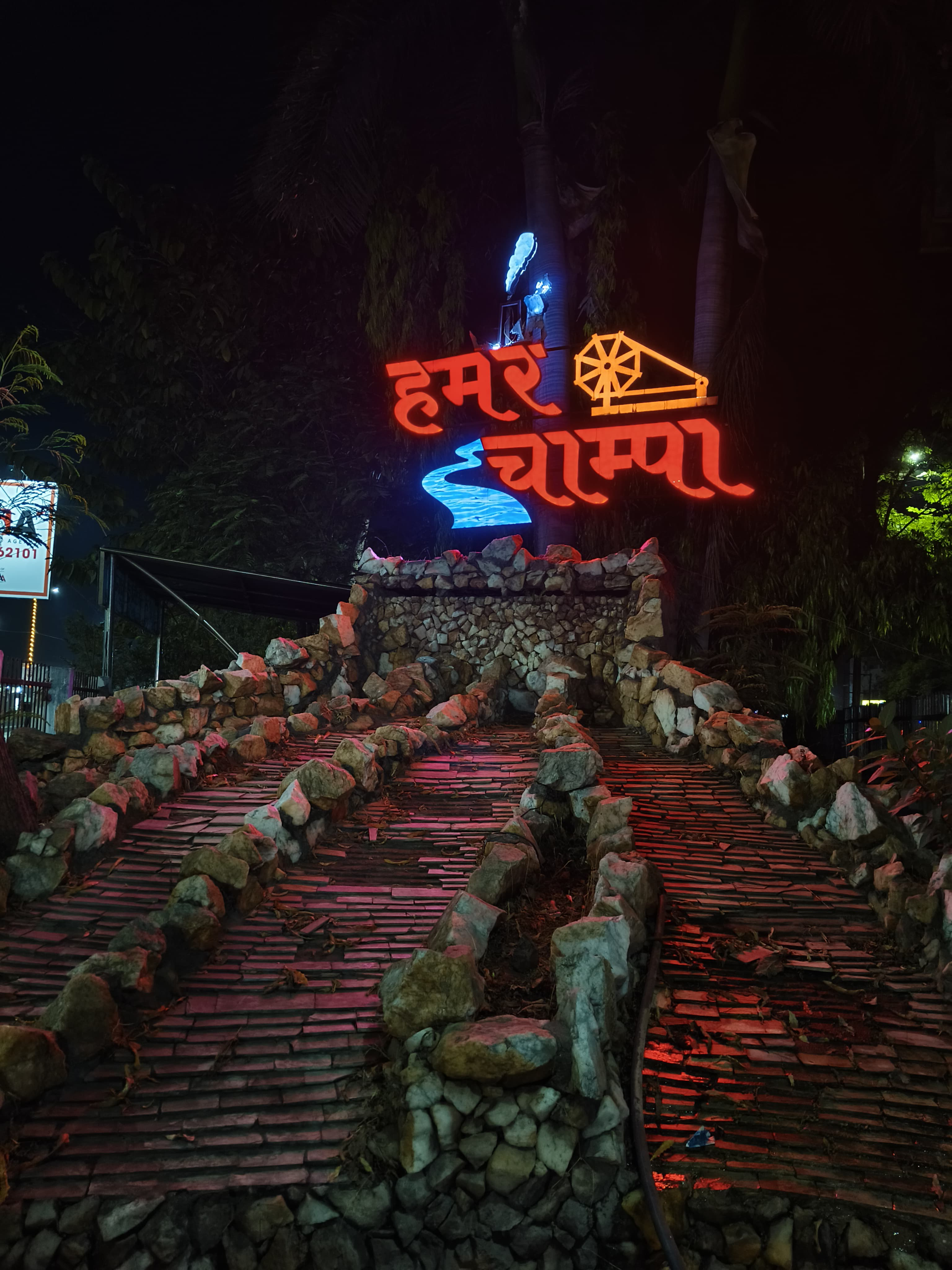
- Hamar Champa word art
- Nickname: CPH
- Location in Chhattisgarh, India Champa (India)
- Coordinates: 22.05°N 82.65°E
- Country: India
- State: Chhattisgarh
- District: Janjgir-Champa
- Settled: 1671
- Founder: Raja Veer Bahadur Thakur Nem Singh
- Named for: Raja Veer Bahadur Thakur Nem Singh

Government
  - Type: Local Government
  - Body: Municipality of Champa (नगर पालिका परिषद चांपा)

Area
  - Total: 40.24 km^{2} (15.54 sq mi)
- Elevation: 253 m (830 ft)

Population (2011)
  - Total: 45,256
  - Rank: 15th in state
  - Density: 1,125/km^{2} (2,913/sq mi)
- Demonym: Champites

Languages
  - Official: Hindi, Chhattisgarhi
- Time zone: UTC+5:30 (IST)
- PIN: 495671
- Telephone code: 07819
- Vehicle registration: CG 11
- Website: www.janjgir-champa.nic.in

Champa was a zamindari estate before Indian Independence. The name of the city, Champa, is derived from the Raja's mare.

Champa is a city and municipality in Janjgir-Champa district in the Indian state of Chhattisgarh.

== Geography ==
Champa has an average elevation of 253 metres (830 feet). It is located on the banks of Hasdeo river, a tributary of Mahanadi.

== Demographics ==
As of 2011 India census, Champa had a population of approx 45000. Males constitute 51% of the population and females 49%. Champa has an average literacy rate of 65%, higher than the national average of 59.5%; with male literacy of 59% and female literacy of 41%. 14% approx of the population is under 6 years of age. The city is divided in two parts by a temple of Samleshwari Devi which is situated in the heart of the city.

== Kosa ==
Kosa Silk of champa is famous for its purity and made by people belong to Dewangan Caste. Kosa is also exported to other countries from here.

== Administration ==
Champa City runs under the administration of the Municipality Of Champa. Pradeep Namdev is mayor of Champa. He is from the Bhartiya Janta Party.

== Economy ==
Champa is famous for Samleshwari Devi temple Kuldevi of champa and Kaleswar Nath Mahadev temple Jagannath temple Mahamaya temple (Madanpur) Rajmahal palace. Champa is also famous for its Kosa silk, gold and brass metal works. Champa has large industries viz. Madhya Bharat Paper Limited (MBPL), Prakash Industries Ltd., CSPGCL's Marwa Power Plant and many mega power projects are in under construction. Kosa silk merchant are particularly from Dewangan caste. They import Kosa (Tassar silk) yarn from China and Korea and make silk shirtings and sarees. They also make yarn from Kosa called Cocoon in English and make Khadi Shirtings. They export it to many Indian states and countries like the U.K., U.S.A. and Brazil. Champa is one of the producer of High Quality Silk.

== Education ==
=== Colleges ===
- Indian Institute of Handloom Technology, Champa
- Govt. M.M.R.Post Graduate college
- The Leprosy Mission Chhattisgarh Vocational Training Centre, Champa

=== School ===
==== English Medium ====
- Delhi Public School Champa
- Fairy Public School [Champa]
- ST. Mary's English Medicum school
- Hasdeo Public School Champa
- Lions Hr. Sec. School Champa
- Rainbow Kidzee School, Champa
- Prince Of Peace English High School Champa CG
- Little Angel Convent School Champa
- Manka Public School, Champa

==== Hindi Medium ====
- Saraswati Shishu Mandir, Champa
- Saraswati Shishu Mandir Primary School (Hatri Bazar)
- Amardeep Public School Champa
- LDN School
- Keshar Public School
- Gyandeep Public School
- Gyanmandir School
- Gaytri Bal Sanskar High School

== Hospitals ==
- JGM Hospital(Jeevanlal Gulabani Memorial Hospital)
- B.D.M. Dharam Hospital (Government Hospital)
- NKH Hospital
- Nayak Nursing Home
- Dewangan Nursing Home
- Mission Hospital
- Osho Dhara Hospital
- Rathore Clinic
- Vinayak Netralay
- Nayak Maternity and Surgical Centre
- TLM Bethesda Leprosy Home and Hospital
- Bachpan Children Hospital

== Transportation ==
Champa is a well connected city to Bigger cities whether by road or by Railways. It is easy to reach champa.

=== Roadways ===
Champa is well connected through roads to state capital Raipur which is 161.4 km away via NH130B and it is connected to Delhi, the country's capital, via NH44.

=== Railways ===
Champa railway station is a junction on the Tatanagar–Bilaspur section of Howrah-Nagpur-Mumbai line. Korba (Gevra) passengers need to change line from here for going to Korba. It is the biggest railway station in the Janjgir-Champa District of Chhattisgarh. It is one of the 'A' graded stations of the country.

=== Air ===
Nearest commercial airport is Swami Vivekananda Airport, Naya Raipur (178 km away).

== Tourist places ==
=== Hanuman Dhara ===
Hanuman Dhara is picnic spot located at northwest city (Side of Hasdeo River). This place is surrounded by dense trees. Name of the spot is for Hanuman Temple, situated in this place.

=== Kera Jhariya ===
It is a tourist place located beside Bank of Hasdev River. According to a historical myth, a monk lived at this place who was capable of crossing the river by walking.

=== Madwarani Temple ===
(17 km away from city) Its goddess durga temple situated at Champa Korba road.

=== Sambleshwari Temple ===
JAGANNATH TEMPLE (BADE MATH)

BABA KALESHWARNATH TEMPLE (Pithampur)

MAHAMAYA TEMPLE (Madanpurgarh)

Rambandha Lake

Vivekanand Garden great

RAJMAHAL PALACE CHAMPA

== Entertainment ==
Champa has two multiplex cinema halls

- Mukund Multiplex (With Three Screen)
- Padmini Cineplex (With Two Screen)

== See also ==
- Janjgir-Champa District
