= Arpa River (Chhattisgarh) =

River Arpa

Location
- Country: India
- Parts: Chhattisgarh
- Region: Coastal Plains
- Administrative areas: Gaurela-Pendra-Marwahi and Bilaspur districts, Chhattisgarh
- City: Bilaspur, Chhattisgarh

Physical characteristics
- Source: khodri khongasara hills
  - location: Bilaspur, Chhattisgarh, India
  - coordinates: 22.09°N 82.14°E
- Mouth
  - location: Gaurela-Pendra-Marwahi district, India
  - elevation: 0 m (0 ft)
- Length: 147 km (91 mi)
- Basin size: 141,600 km^{2} (54,700 sq mi)
- Width
  - average: 400 m
- Depth
  - average: 2-8 m

Basin features
- Tributaries
  - right: Kharang River, Malaniya, Sonkachar,

Arpa River is a river in the Indian State of Chhattisgarh. It is a major tributary of the river Seonath that meets with Mahanadi. Arpa River originates from Khodri village of Gaurela-Pendra-Marwahi District and flows to meet with Seonath River at Matiyari village of Bilha block of Bilaspur district. 1

Seonath river is a main tributary of Mahanadi River which is known as the perennial source of irrigation in the state of Chhattisgarh.

== Location ==
Arpa river is a tributary of Shivnath River.

Arpa River has its origin from the lust dense forest area of Khondari-Khongsara. In 147 km of the river length, it contributes more than 90 km to the forest area, including Bilaspur city and irrigated lands of this district before meeting to Seonath river. The river is having catchment area of about 2022 km^{2}. During rainy season its water level raises 2–3 meters up and in summer it moves 5 meters down. The river bed is mostly sandy with thickness of about 1.5 meter and few rock exposures at some places.

More than 10 check dams have been constructed on this river. Earlier these check dams were constructed to overcome the problem of irrigation and for human welfare. But due to the drying of its origin sites for last 5 years its water content is decreasing day by day and these check dams have become danger for the river. The maximum part of the rain water gets stored in these check dams and is used by the local people and as a result little water reaches to Bilaspur. 2
