= Janjgir–Champa district =

Coordinates: 22°01′01″N 82°34′01″E

- District of Chhattisgarh
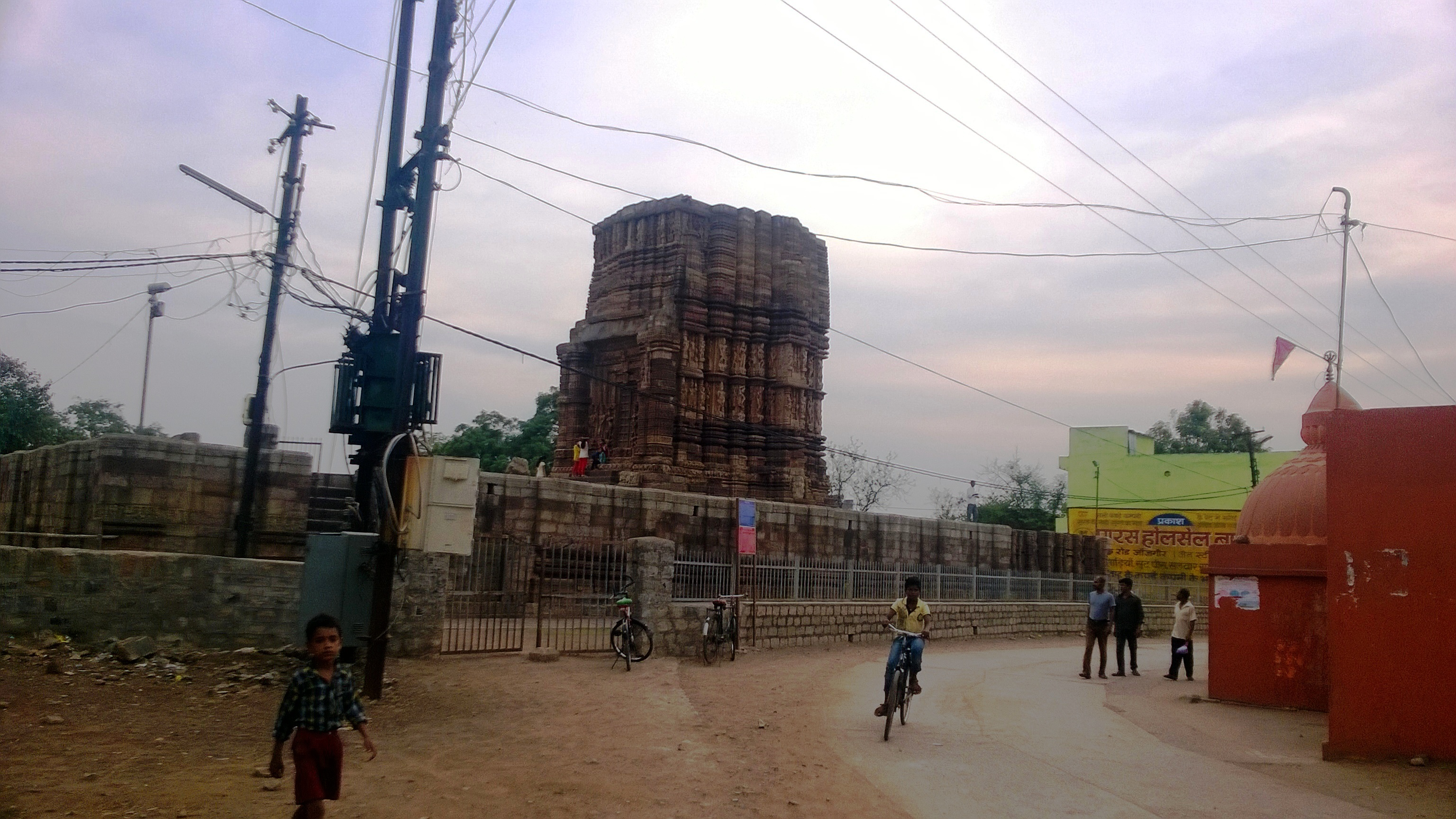
- Temple in Janjgir
- Interactive map of Janjgir–Champa district
- Country: India
- State: Chhattisgarh
- Division: Bilaspur
- Headquarters: Janjgir
- Tehsils: 9

Government
  - Lok Sabha constituencies: 1
  - Vidhan Sabha constituencies: 6

Area
  - Total: 4,466.74 km^{2} (1,724.62 sq mi)

Population (2011)
  - Total: 1,619,707
  - Density: 362.615/km^{2} (939.169/sq mi)
  - Urban: 225,199

Demographics
  - Literacy: 73.7%
  - Sex ratio: 986
- Time zone: UTC+05:30 (IST)
- Average annual precipitation: 1157.1 mm
- Website: https://janjgir-champa.gov.in/en/

Janjgir–Champa district is a district in the Indian state of Chhattisgarh. The district's headquarters, Janjgir, is the city of Maharaja Jajawalya Dev of the Kalachuri dynasty. Champa is the city named after Raja Veer bahadur's Horse called "Champak". Earlier a part of the Bilaspur district, Jangir-Champa was carved out in 1998 to a separate district of its own. Inhabitants are generally migrants from nearby villages.

The present collector of Janjgir-Champa is Janmejay Mahobe.

== History ==
The Janjgir–Champa district, which is best known as the heart of Chhattisgarh because of its central location in state, was established on 25 May 1998. The Vishnu Mandir of the district reflects its golden past. Janjgir- Champa is also a place where one can find a number of temples having very versatile history. On August 15, 2021 then Chief Minister of Chhattisgarh announced the creation of new districts in the state. One of these was the newly formed district of Sakti, which was carved out of Janjgir-Champa district by transferring many villages and cities to the new district.

== Economy ==
KSK Energy Venture (6 x 600 MW) is one of the major thermal power plant of the district.

== Demographics ==
Religions in Janjgir-Champa district (2011)
Religion	Percent
Hinduism	98.44%
Islam	1.04%
Other or not stated	0.52%
Distribution of religions

According to the 2011 census, Janjgir–Champa has a population of 1,619,707, roughly equal to the nation of Guinea-Bissau or the US state of Idaho. This denotes it as the 308th largest district (out of 640) in India. The district has a population density of 421 inhabitants per square kilometre (1,090/sq mi). Its population growth rate over the decade 2001-2011 was 23.01%. Janjgir–Champa has a sex ratio of 991 females for every 1,000 males, and a literacy rate of 73.7%.

After bifurcation, the district had a population of 966,671, of which 163,553 (16.92%) live in urban areas. Janjgir-Champa has a sex ratio of 973 females per 1000 males. Scheduled Castes and Scheduled Tribes make up 249,522 (25.81%) and 82,900 (8.58%) of the population respectively.

Languages of Janjgir-Champa district (2011)
1. Chhattisgarhi (94.2%)
2. Hindi (4.30%)
3. Others (1.54%)

At the time of the 2011 Census of India, 94.16% of the population in the district spoke Chhattisgarhi, and 4.30% Hindi as their first language.

== See also ==
- Janjgir–Champa Lok Sabha constituency
