= Devendra Pratap Singh (Chhattisgarh politician) =

Indian politician

Member of Parliament, Rajya Sabha
- Incumbent
- Assumed office 3 April 2024
- Preceded by: Saroj Pandey, BJP
- Constituency: Chhattisgarh

Personal details
- Born: 2 May 1975 (age 51) Raigarh, Madhya Pradesh, India (now in Chhattisgarh, India)
- Party: Bharatiya Janata Party
- Spouse: Bhawanidevi Singh (m. 1999)
- Children: Vishwa Vijay Singh Trishivam Raje Singh
- Parent: Surendra Kumar Singh (father)
- Relatives: Raigarh State
- Education: Rajkumar College, Raipur; St. Stephen's College, Delhi (BA); University of Delhi (MA)

Raja Devendra Pratap Singh (also Kumar Devendra Pratap Singh) (born 2 May 1975) is an Indian politician and a Member of Parliament in the Rajya Sabha representing the state of Chhattisgarh.Raja Devendra Pratap Singh is the titular Raja of the Erstwhile Princely state of Raigarh. He is the grandson of Maharaja Bahadur Chakradhar Singh.

Devendra Pratap Singh is the son of Surendra Kumar Singh and grandson of Raja Chakradhar Singh, the raja of Raigarh State during the British Raj in India.

== Early life and education ==
Devendra was born on 2 May 1975 to Surendra Kumar Singh of Raj Gond dynasty. He completed his schooling at Rajkumar College, Raipur and was admitted to St. Stephen's College, Delhi, University of Delhi where he pursued BA and MA in history.

Singh's father Surendra Kumar Singh was a politician, who served as MLA from Lailunga and also Rajya Sabha MP from Chhattisgarh. His uncle Raja Lalitkumar Singh was the last Raja of Raigarh State.

Singh's married Bhawani Devi Singh (Kumari Archana Devi) of Nilgiri State and had issue. Vishwa Vijay Singh and Trishivam Raje Singh.

== Political career ==
On 11 February 2024, he was announced as BJP Candidate from Chhattisgarh in upcoming Rajya Sabha election.
