= Natwar High School =

Location
- Near Railway Station Chauk, Raigarh district, Chhattisgarh, 496001; India; 21.8940671°N 83.3903443°E

Information
- School type: Government
- Founded: 1906
- Founder: Raja Bhup Deo Singh Bahadur
- Campus: Urban
- Affiliation: Central Board of Secondary Education

Natwar High School also called Government Natwar Higher Secondery School is a Government run, co-educational, high school in Raigarh, India. It is located Near Clock tower, Raigarh. It is one of the oldest high school of Chhattisgarh. It is currently affiliated to CBSE.

== History ==
It was established in 1906 by the Raja of Raigarh State, Raja Bhup Deo Singh Bahadur. He named it after his son and heir-apparent, Natwar Singh

In 2022 , when Government wanted to rename school after one religious leader, people came on road to protest and government withdraw proposal to change name of the school.

The school features a large ground where, every year on the eve of Vijayadashami, one of the region's largest effigies of Ravana is burnt. The entire town gathers here to celebrate the festival.

Every year on National Cadet Corps foundation day the NCC cadets hold parade at Natwar High School ground.

== See also ==
- Education in India
- Literacy in India
- List of institutions of higher education in Chhattisgarh
- Education in Chhattisgarh
