= Lalitkumar Singh =

Last ruling Raja of Raigarh from 1947–1948

Raja Bahadur Lalitkumar Singh
- Raja Bahadur of Raigarh
- Reign: 7 October 1947 – 1 January 1948
- Predecessor: Maharaja Chakradhar Singh
- Successor: Raja Bahadur Vikram Bahadur Singh (Titular)
- Born: 1924; Raigarh, Chhattisgarh, India
- Died: October 2000 (aged 75–76); Raigarh, Chhattisgarh, India
- House: Raj Gond Dynasty
- Father: Maharaja Chakradhar Singh

Member of the Madhya Pradesh Legislative Assembly
- In office 1952–1962
- Constituency: Gharghoda

Personal details
- Party: Indian National Congress

Raja Lalitkumar Singh (1924–2000) was the last official ruler of princely state of Raigarh State. He ascended the throne in 1947 upon death of his father Raja Chakradhar Singh and acceded his State into Union of India on 1 January 1948.

== Early life and education ==
Raja Bahadur Lalit Kumar Singh was born in 1924 into the ruling Raj Gond dynasty of Raigarh State in the Central Provinces of British India. He was the eldest son of Maharaja Chakradhar Singh, the celebrated ruler of Raigarh known for his immense patronization of Kathak dance and Indian classical music.He married Rani Mangal Moti Devi of Pal Lahara State.

As the heir apparent to the Raigarh gaddi, Lalit Kumar Singh spent his childhood within the cultural environment of the Raigarh court. Following the family tradition of Chhattisgarhi princely states, he was sent to Rajkumar College, Raipur for his formal education. At the college, he received academic tutoring along with training in sports, leadership, and administrative statecraft designed for the young princes of the region.

== Political career ==
Following the integration of Raigarh State into independent India, Lalit Kumar Singh transitioned from royal administration to democratic politics. He joined the Indian National Congress (INC) and contested India's historic first general elections in 1952. He was elected as a Member of the Legislative Assembly (MLA) to the Madhya Pradesh Legislative Assembly from the Gharghoda constituency, serving his initial term from 1952 to 1957.

He successfully contested the subsequent assembly elections in 1957 from the reconstituted Chargoda constituency (also referred to as Gharghoda in combined state segments), securing a consecutive second term from 1957 to 1962. During his tenures in office, he actively championed developmental works, utilizing parts of his personal estate and resources to support local land grants and welfare infrastructure for the public in the newly formed Raigarh region.

Following the 26th Amendment to the Constitution of India in 1971, which abolished the privy purses and official recognition of titles for former rulers, he faced severe financial constraints. In 1980, he attempted a return to active electoral politics by standing for election again, but was ultimately unsuccessful. He lived his remaining years in retirement within Raigarh until his death in October 2000.

== Succession and accession ==
Upon the sudden demise of his father, Maharaja Chakradhar Singh, on 7 October 1947, Lalit Kumar Singh ascended the throne as the 4th Raja of Raigarh State. His active reign was historically brief due to the political integration of India. On 1 January 1948, he signed the instrument of accession, officially merging the princely state of Raigarh into the Dominion of India. Following the merger, the state was integrated into the Central Provinces (later Madhya Pradesh), and he retained his royal title and privileges as a titular ruler.

- Raja Vikram Bahadur Singh
- Maharaj Surendra Kumar Singh
- Raja Bahadur Devendra Pratap Singh (Chhattisgarh politician),(Present Titular Raja Bahadur of Raigarh).
