= Rajkumar College =

Rajkumar College may refer to:

- Rajkumar College, Raipur
- Rajkumar College, Rajkot
