= Kirodimal Govt. Arts and Science College =

Indian College

Kirodimal Government Arts and Science College, Raigarh
- Other name: Govt Degree College
- Motto: 'विनयात् शोभते विद्या'
- Type: Autonomous, Public
- Established: 1958
- Affiliations: University Grants Commission(UGU), NAAC
- Academic affiliations: Shaheed Nandkumar Patel University
- Location: Chakradhar Nagar, Raigarh, Chhattisgarh, 496001, India; 21.8919517°N 83.4098343°E
- Campus: Urban
- Website: kgcollageraigarh.ac.in

Kirodimal Government Arts and Science College, also known as Kirodimal Government Degree College, Raigarh is a coeducational degree college located in Raigarh, Chhattisgarh, India . Established in 1958. It is an Autonomous College Registered under section 2(f) & 12(B) of UGC Act and affiliated to Shaheed Nandkumar Patel University, Raigarh .

== History ==
The college was established in 1958 and was initially affiliated to Pandit Ravishankar Shukla University . In 1985, it became affiliated to Guru Ghasidas Vishwavidyalaya .2012 it is affiliated to Bilaspur University now college is affiliated to Shaheed Nandkumar Patel University.
