= Chakradhar Singh =

Raja of Raigarh from 1924 to 1947

Raja Bahadur Chakradhar Singh
- Raja Bahadur
- Raja Bahadur Chakradhar Singh
- Reign: 1924 – 1947
- Predecessor: Raja Natwar Singh
- Successor: Lalit Kumar Singh
- Born: 19 August 1905; Raigarh
- Died: 7 October 1947 (aged 42); Raigarh
- Spouses: Rani Dishwarimati Devi Rani Basantmala Devi Rani Lokeshwari Devi
- Issue: Lalit Kumar Singh, Bhanu Pratap Singh, Surendra Kumar Singh
- Father: Raja Bhup Deo Singh
- Mother: Rani Ram Kuwar

Raja Chakradhar Singh (19 August 1905 −7 October 1947) was the Raja of Raigarh and Chief of Bargarh ruled by Raj Gond dynasty. He was the ruler of Princely state of Raigarh from 1924 till his death in 1947. He was son of Raja Bhup Deo Singh, who died in 1917.

== Early life ==
He completed his education from Rajkumar College, Raipur. He succeeded to throne of Raigrah upon death of his elder brother, Raja Natwar Singh in 1924. The government management however continued till 1927 when Raja was invested with powers.

== Music ==
He was a great patron of Indian arts, classical dance, music invited to his capital music and dance-experts from different parts of the country. His contribution has been important in the development of the classical form of Kathak. During the reign of Raja Chakradhar Singh, experts of both the gharanas, namely, Jaipur and Lucknow gained prominent positions and were patronised by him. Even experts from Benares gharana were in his court. The Raigarh Gharana of Kathak was established by him during his reign, which produced many luminaries, dancers, singers and musicians due to his patronage and philanthropy. Among the noted Kathak exponents to have served his court were Pandit Jaggannath Prasad of Jaipur Gharana and Guru Kalaka Prasad and his sons of Lucknow Gharana. He invented a new dance form by mixing different dance forms, which led to foundation of Raigarh Gharana. Raigarh Gharana thus founded by Raja Chakradhar Singh, although the youngest of all gharanas, has its own compositions of thumris, ghazals, todas and bols which are unique in themselves.

Chakradhar Singh was himself a great exponent of tabla and pakhawaj. He was himself also a good dancer and musician. His patronage extended to all dancers irrespective of their gharana. His name is often taken with Wajid Ali Shah of Awadh as a patron of classical Indian dance and music, especially with respect to Kathak dance and Hindustani classical music. Among the dancers and musicians to have performed or served his court were Pandit Makhan Lal Chaturvedi, Dr. Ramkumar Verma, Pandit Mahaveer Prasad Dwivedi, Pandit Padumlal Punnalal Bakshi. Even Sanskrit language writers like Pandit Sadashiv Das, Pandit Sharda Prasad, Pandit Kashi Dutt Jha served him, through them he translated a lot of music and dance literature in Sanskrit.

In 1938, Chakradhar Singh headed the first All India Music Conference held at Allahabad. In this conference Chakradhar Singh went with his team of 60 artists. In 1939, the conference organised a welcome party for Viceroy of India, where Kathak dancer Karthik Kalyan presented the dance and was assisted by Chakradhar Singh, who played tabla. He was given title of Sangit Samrat - (King of Music) by the Viceroy Lord Linlithgow at this conference. In 1943 conference at Khairagarh, he again played tabla for the dance performance of Kalyan Das.

He had a very good knowledge of Hindi, Sanskrit, Urdu and Oriya and has written several books on Indian traditional music such as

- Alkapuri Tilasmi
- Bairagadiya Rajkumar
- Joshe Pharhad
- Kavya Kanan
- Mayachakra
- Moorj Paran Pushpakar
- Mriganayni
- Nartan Sarwasya
- Nigare Pharhad
- Prem ke Teer
- Raag Ratna Manjusha
- Ramyaras
- Ratnahar
- Taal Toynidhi
- Taalbal Pushpakar

== Death ==
Raja Chakaradhar Singh died on 7 October 1947 just after independence of India. After his death, Lalit Kumar Singh, his son succeeded him to the throne of Raigarh and ruled briefly before the Raigarh State was merged into Union of India on 14 December 1947.

The princely states of Jashpur, Raigarh, Sakti, Sarangarh and Udaipur were united later to form the Raigarh district.

His second son Surendra Kumar Singh was a politician of Indian National Congress.

== Legacy ==
There is a music academy established after him, as his memorial at Raigarh.
