= Bhup Deo Singh =

Raja of Raigarh from 1894 to 1917

Raja Bhup Deo Singh
- Raja Bahadur of Raigarh State
- Raja Of Raigarh
- Reign: 1890 – 1917
- Predecessor: Raja Ghanshyam Singh
- Successor: Raja Natwar Singh
- Born: 1867; Raigarh, Chhattisgarh, India
- Died: 1917 (aged 49–50); Raigarh, Chhattisgarh, India
- Issue: Raja Natwar Singh; Maharaja Chakradhar Singh
- House: Raj Gond Dynasty
- Father: Raja Ghanshyam Singh

Raja Bhup Deo Singh Bahadur (1867–1917) was the Raja of Raigarh and Chief of Bargarh ruled by Gond dynasty. He was the ruler of the Princely state of Raigarh from 1894 till his death in 1917.

== Early life and education ==
Raja Bhup Deo Singh was born in 1867 into the ruling Raj Gond dynasty of Raigarh State in the Central Provinces of British India. He belonged to a lineage of Raj Gond chieftains who tracing their roots to ancient regional settlements prior to establishing their seat at Raigarh.

Growing up within the royal household, Bhup Deo Singh received traditional aristocratic training alongside a formal Western education. According to the Imperial Gazetteer of India, he was well-educated, proficient in the English language, and actively involved in the study of statecraft from an early age. His upbringing placed a strong emphasis on administrative capability, enabling him to exercise direct personal control over public administration, revenue collection, and judicial affairs upon his formal accession to the throne in 1894.

== Accession and reign ==
Bhup Deo Singh succeeded to the chiefship of Raigarh State and was formally installed on the gaddi (throne) in 1894 with the hereditary title of Raja. Unlike many contemporary feudatory arrangements, his installation was granted without restrictive administrative conditions due to his recognized competence and personal oversight of public business.

During his reign, Raigarh underwent significant structural and social developments, including the establishment of civic infrastructure and the patrons of religious institutions. A devout devotee of Jagannath, he commissioned the construction of the prominent Jagannath Temple in Raigarh and initiated the state's annual Ratha Yatra festival. In 1911, in recognition of his governance and loyalty, the British Raj elevated the status of the state and conferred upon him the personal title of Raja Bahadur.

== Family and succession ==
Raja Bhup Deo Singh was married to Rani Ram Kuwar and had issue, including two notable sons who succeeded him in turn:

- Raja Natwar Singh (1917–1924), who succeeded him upon his death in March 1917. Born on 1891
- Maharaja Chakradhar Singh (1924–1947), who ascended the throne in 1924 and Born on 1905. became a celebrated patron of Kathak dance and Indian classical music.

He was son of Raja Ghanshyam Singh. Bhup Deo Singh was installed on throne on 1894 with title of Raja. British Gazetteer mentions he was educated and exercised personal control over affairs of his state In 1911 status of the state was raised and the title Raja Bahadur was given to the rulers by British. He died in 1917 and his son Raja Natwar Singh succeeded him as next ruler.
