= Raigarh Airport =

Airport in Raigarh, Chhattisgarh India

- IATA: none; ICAO: VERH

Summary
- Airport type: Private
- Operator: AAI
- Serves: Raigarh
- Location: Kondatarai, Chhattisgarh, India
- Elevation AMSL: 791 ft / 241 m
- Coordinates: 21°49′26″N 83°21′37″E

Map
- Location of airport in Chhattisgarh VERH (India)

Runways
Direction	Length		Surface
Direction	ft	m	Surface
12/30	3,940	1,200	asphalt

Raigarh Airport is located near Kondatarai, 9 km (5.6 mi) south of Raigarh, in Chhattisgarh, India. The air strip is used mainly for small aircraft and choppers.
