= Chhattisgarh Board of Secondary Education =

Indian educational organization

- Abbreviation: CGBSE
- Formation: 1 November 2000; 26 years ago
- Type: Governmental Board of School Education
- Headquarters: Raipur, Chhattisgarh, India
- Location: Chhattisgarh, India
- Official language: Hindi
- Website: https://cgbse.org.in/

Chhattisgarh Board of Secondary Education (abbreviated as CGBSE) is a board of education in the state of Chhattisgarh, India. CGBSE is a state agency of the Government of Chhattisgarh, it is responsible for promotion and development of secondary education in Chhattisgarh. The Board has conducted its exams independently from the year 2002, and conducts High School, Higher Secondary and Diploma Courses. The board is responsible for training of education professionals, operation of examinations, and the curriculum in the state.

== Establishment ==
After the formation of Chhattisgarh state on 1 November 2000, Chhattisgarh government School Education Department was upgraded to Chhattisgarh Board of Secondary Education on 20 September 2001 under Legislative Notification No. 10-5-/13/2001-Raipur-20-7-2001.

== Examinations ==
CGBSE conducts the examinations for Class 10 and Class 12 every year in the month of March. The results are declared by the end of May.

- High School leaving certificate exam (regular / self study / correspondence)
- Higher Secondary School leaving certificate exam (regular / self study / correspondence)
- Higher Secondary (Professional) School leaving certificate exam (regular / self study)
- Diploma in Education (regular / correspondence)
- Diploma in Physical Education

== See also ==
- Education in Chhattisgarh
- Central Board of Secondary Education (CBSE), India
- National Institute of Open Schooling (NIOS), India
- Indian Certificate of Secondary Education (ICSE), India
- Indian School Certificate (ISC), India
- Council for the Indian School Certificate Examinations (CISCE), India
- Secondary School Leaving Certificate (SSLC), India
