= Natwar Singh of Raigarh =

Raja of Raigarh from 1917 to 1924

Raja Natwar Singh Bahadur (13 March 1891 – 1924) was a gond ruler of Raigarh State from 1917- 1924. He succeeded to throne upon death of his father Raja Bhup Deo Singh Bahadur on 22 March 1917, but proved to be incapable of managing his state and it was placed under the control of Government. He died in 1924 and was succeeded by his brother Chakradhar Singh. Natwar High School, Raigarh is named after him.
