= Shaheed Nandkumar Patel University =

University in Chhattisgarh

- Motto in English: The faithful gain knowledge
- Type: Public
- Established: 22 January 2020
- Affiliations: UGC, NCTE
- Chancellor: Governor of Chhattisgarh
- Vice-Chancellor: Prof. Vinay Chauhan
- Location: Raigarh, Raigarh District, Chhattisgarh, 496001, India; 21°51′25″N 83°24′32″E
- Campus: Urban
- Language: English, Hindi
- Website: snpv.ac.in

Shaheed Nandkumar Patel Vishwavidyalaya (University) is an Indian state university in Raigarh, Chhattisgarh. It was established by the Gazette notification on 22 January 2020 of the Chhattisgarh Act, The Chhattisgarh Vishwavidyalaya (Amendment) Act, 2019, and opened in January 2020. The university is on the site of the Kirodimal Institute of Technology's Raigarh Building, close to Garhumaria, Odisha Road, Raigarh.

== Government Colleges affiliated to Shaheed Nandkumar Patel Vishwavidyalaya ==
Government Colleges affiliated to Shaheed Nandkumar Patel Vishwavidyalaya
S.No.	Code	College	District
1	301	Govt. Dr. Indrajit Singh College, Akaltara	Janjgir–Champa
2	302	Govt. Naveen College, Baloda	Janjgir–Champa
3	303	Govt. M.M.R. P.G. College, Champa	Janjgir–Champa
4	304	Govt. College, Dabhara	Janjgir–Champa
5	305	Govt. Naveen College, Hasoud	Janjgir–Champa
6	306	Govt. College, Jaijaipur	Janjgir–Champa
7	307	Govt. T.C.L. P.G. College, Janjgir	Janjgir–Champa
8	308	Govt. Jajalyadeo Naveen Girls College, Janjgir	Janjgir–Champa
9	309	Govt. Laxmaneshwar College, Kharoud	Janjgir–Champa
10	310	Govt. Vedram College, Malkharoda	Janjgir–Champa
11	311	Govt. Kranti Kumar Bhartiya College, Sakti	Janjgir–Champa
12	312	Dr. Bhimrao Ambedkar Government College, Pamgarh	Janjgir–Champa
13	313	Govt. Naveen College, Navagarh	Janjgir–Champa
14	314	Govt. Naveen College, Chandrapur	Janjgir–Champa
15	315	Govt. Naveen College, Birra	Janjgir–Champa
16	316	Govt. Atal Bihari Vajpayee College, Nagarada	Janjgir–Champa
17	701	Govt. College, Dharamjaigarh	Raigarh
18	702	Govt. College, Gharghoda	Raigarh
19	703	Govt. Mahatma Gandhi College, Kharsia	Raigarh
20	704	Govt. Sant Gahira Guru Rameshwar College, Lailunga	Raigarh
21	705	Govt. P.D. Arts & Science College, Raigarh	Raigarh
22	706	Govt. K.M.T. Girls College, Raigarh	Raigarh
23	707	Kirodimal Government Arts and Science College, Raigarh	Raigarh
24	708	Govt. Lochan Prasad Pandey College, Sarangarh	Raigarh
25	709	Govt. College, Tamnar	Raigarh
26	710	Shaheed Veer Narayan Singh Government College, Jobi Barra	Raigarh
27	711	Govt. Naveen College, Baramkela	Raigarh
28	712	Govt. Naveen College, Pusour	Raigarh
29	713	Govt. Naveen College, Sariya	Raigarh

== Private Colleges affiliated to Shaheed Nandkumar Patel Vishwavidyalaya ==
Private Colleges affiliated to Shaheed Nandkumar Patel Vishwavidyalaya
S.No.	Code	College	District
1	402	Arts and Science College, Baloda	Janjgir–Champa
2	403	Lal Bahadur Shastri Arts & Commerce College, Baloda	Janjgir–Champa
3	404	Lal Bahadur Shastri College of Education, Baloda	Janjgir–Champa
4	405	Seth Surajmal Jaipuriya College, Bamhanidih	Janjgir–Champa
5	406	Jagrani Devi College, Baradwar	Janjgir–Champa
6	409	Rambai Kanhaiyalal Sahu Arts & Science College, Hasoud	Janjgir–Champa
7	410	Gyandeep College of Education, Janjgir	Janjgir–Champa
8	411	Gyanoday College of Education, Janjgir	Janjgir–Champa
9	412	Konark College of Education, Khokhsa	Janjgir–Champa
10	413	Pt. Harishankar College of Education, Sarkhon	Janjgir–Champa
11	414	S.D. College, Navagarh	Janjgir–Champa
12	415	Pt. J.L.N. College, Navagarh	Janjgir–Champa
13	416	G.R.D. College, Pamgarh	Janjgir–Champa
14	417	Chaitanya Arts & Science College, Pamgarh	Janjgir–Champa
15	418	Sant Shiromani Guru Ghasidas College, Pamgarh	Janjgir–Champa
16	420	Indira Gandhi Arts & Science College, Rahod	Janjgir–Champa
17	421	Shri Sandeepani Vigyan Sansthan College, Rahod	Janjgir–Champa
18	422	Rahod Education Society College, Rahod	Janjgir–Champa
19	423	J.L.N. College, Sakti	Janjgir–Champa
20	424	Kalindri Devi Tilak Ramchandra Arts & Science College, Salni	Janjgir–Champa
21	425	Shri Mahant Laldas Arts & Science College, Shivrinarayan	Janjgir–Champa
22	426	Shri Mahant Laldas Education College, Shivrinarayan	Janjgir–Champa
23	427	Shanti Durga College, Mudpar (Shivrinarayan)	Janjgir–Champa
24	428	Sanskriti Mahavidyalaya, Meu (Pamgarh)	Janjgir–Champa
25	429	Dr. Radha Krishna Computer College, Baloda	Janjgir–Champa
26	430	Utkarsh College of Education, Sarkhon	Janjgir–Champa
27	431	Jagrani Devi College of Education, Baradwar	Janjgir–Champa
28	433	Shri Krishna College of Education, Khokhasa	Janjgir–Champa
29	434	Shyam College of Education, Rishabh Tirth (Gunji), Sakti	Janjgir–Champa
30	435	Keshari Shikshan Samiti College, Khokhara	Janjgir–Champa
31	436	Maa Education College, Pamgarh	Janjgir–Champa
32	437	Shri Sandeepani College of Education, Rahod	Janjgir–Champa
33	438	Gyan Roshani Lok Kalyan Sanstha, Khokhara	Janjgir–Champa
34	439	Shiv Shakti Institute, Khorsi	Janjgir–Champa
35	440	Radhakrishna Shikshan Samiti, Rachhabhatha, Navagarh	Janjgir–Champa
36	441	S.D. College, Meu (Navagarh)	Janjgir–Champa
37	442	O.P. Sharma College, Dabhara	Janjgir–Champa
38	—	Mahamaya Mahavidyalaya, Naka Chowk, Sakti	Janjgir–Champa
39	—	Maa Sambalpurhin Dai Girls Degree College, Dabhara	Janjgir–Champa
40	—	Gyanroshani College, Janjgir	Janjgir–Champa
41	444	Shri Rishabh Vidyoday Mahavidyalaya, Banahil (Post Nariyara)	Janjgir–Champa
42	—	Jagrani Devi College of Education, Darrabhatha (Thathari, Jaijaipur)	Janjgir–Champa
43	—	Shankaracharya Arts, Science and Commerce College, Dabhara	Janjgir–Champa
44	—	Shri Balaji Mahavidyalaya, Rishabh Tirth, Gunji	Janjgir–Champa
45	—	Shiv Shakti Arts & Science College, Khorsi	Janjgir–Champa
46	—	Jagrani Devi College of Education, Darrabhatha (Duplicate entry)	Janjgir–Champa
47	—	Virat Lakshya College, Champa	Janjgir–Champa
48	—	Dr. Jyotibhrijbhushan Dwivedi Arts & Science College, Sakti	Janjgir–Champa
49	—	Jagrani Devi College, Dabhara	Janjgir–Champa
50	801	Om Maya Sundram College, Vrindavan Chhal	Raigarh
51	803	Dr. B.S.P. Arts, Science and Commerce College, Gharghoda	Raigarh
52	804	Shri Siddheswar Adivasi College, Gorpar	Raigarh
53	805	Girls Arts & Commerce College, Kharsia	Raigarh
54	806	National Commerce & Science College, Kharsia	Raigarh
55	807	Dr. B.S.P. Adivasi College, Murabazar	Raigarh
56	808	Maa Mangla College, Raigarh	Raigarh
57	809	Raigarh City College, Raigarh	Raigarh
58	810	S.B.K.P. Law College, Raigarh	Raigarh
59	811	Batmul Ashram College, Mahapalli (Salheona)	Raigarh
60	812	C.P.M. Arts & Science College, Sarangarh	Raigarh
61	813	Purwanchal College, Sariya	Raigarh
62	814	Maa Mangla College of I.T. & Management, Raigarh	Raigarh
63	815	Uttam Memorial College, Raigarh	Raigarh
64	816	Smt. Ukiya Devi Smriti College, Sariya	Raigarh
65	817	Shriram Aadarsh Mahila College, Sarangarh	Raigarh
66	818	Aricent College, Raigarh	Raigarh
67	819	Aricent College of Education, Raigarh	Raigarh
68	820	Janki College of Education, Dhanuhardera	Raigarh
69	822	Raigarh College of Education, Kotarapali	Raigarh
70	823	Dr. B.S.P. Aadiwasi College, Dharamjaigarh	Raigarh
71	824	K.P. College, Bandhapali (Sarangarh)	Raigarh
72	825	J.V.G. College of Education, Kotrapali (Jurda)	Raigarh
73	826	Ashoka College, Ummedpur, Sarangarh	Raigarh
74	827	Raigarh College of Education, Raigarh	Raigarh
75	828	S.S. College, Raigarh	Raigarh
76	—	Janki College of Education, Dhanuhardera	Raigarh
77	—	Anant College, Bade Antarmuda, Prachi Vihar, Raigarh	Raigarh
78	—	Maa Darshan College, Vikas Nagar, Kotara Road, Raigarh	Raigarh
79	—	Maa Parvati College, Kusmura, Raigarh	Raigarh
80	—	Raigarh Institute of Technology and Science, Kotrapali (Jurda)	Raigarh

== See also ==
- Education in Chhattisgarh
- Education in India
