= Education in Chhattisgarh =

One of the newly formed states in India, Chhattisgarh covers an area of 135,194 km^{2}. It was recognized as a state on 1 November 2000. The education scenario in Chhattisgarh lacks proper educational infrastructure. However, the state government has launched several programs to enhance the academic scenario of the state. The overall growth in the literacy rate has been possible due to the persistent efforts of the state government.

According to the 2001 census report, Chhattisgarh had a literacy rate of 65.18% which included male and female literacy rate of 77.86% and 52.40% respectively. Special importance is given to the education of women and students belonging to the underprivileged section of the society.

The capital city Raipur is the main center of higher education in Chhattisgarh. It houses some of the most important departments of education in the state. Also the twin City of Bhilai-Durg is known as the "Education hub of Chhattisgarh" as there are many well known schools and coaching institutes present for the preparation of various competitive exams. In Bhilai sector 5 Market (New Civic Center) and sector 10 Zonal market is a major hub for NEET & JEE pretest coaching centers. They have active more than 100 centers and thousands of students preparing for NEET and JEE.

== Primary education ==
Most of the children in the state generally attend 3 years of Montessori school before joining 1st standard in the school. The schools in Chhattisgarh follow the same 10+2 pattern of education as the other union territories and states in India. One can come across both private and state-run schools in Chhattisgarh. The government run schools are mostly affiliated to the Chhattisgarh Board of Secondary Education. Students can also join schools affiliated with the Central Board of Secondary Education (CBSE) or the Council for the Indian School Certificate Examination (CISCE).

In state-run schools Hindi is generally the medium of instruction while English is preferred by most of the private schools. New Life English School Jankpur, Jain International School, Adarsh Vidya Mandir, Gyanganga Educational Academy, Delhi Public School, Kaanger Valley Academy, Bhartiya Sanskriti Higher Secondary School and Salem English School, The Little Angels Academy Dharampura, Aadeshwar Academy, are some of the popular schools in Chhattisgarh. Under Raipur District total 508 including RMSA school. Dr. R. Bambra is deo raipur

== Higher education ==
=== Technical education ===
Most of the colleges and institutions in the state are affiliated to any of these government recognized universities. The colleges in Chhattisgarh offer various courses in architecture, engineering.

=== Medical education ===
Most of the colleges and institutions in the state are affiliated to any of these government recognized universities. The colleges in Chhattisgarh offer various courses in biotechnology, dental science, law, hotel management, medical, physiotherapy, mass communication, nursing, veterinary science and management.
