= Raigarh State =

Indian princely state during the British Raj

Coordinates: 21.9°N 83.4°E

Raigarh State रायगढ़ रियासत
- Princely State of British India
- 1625–1947
- Flag

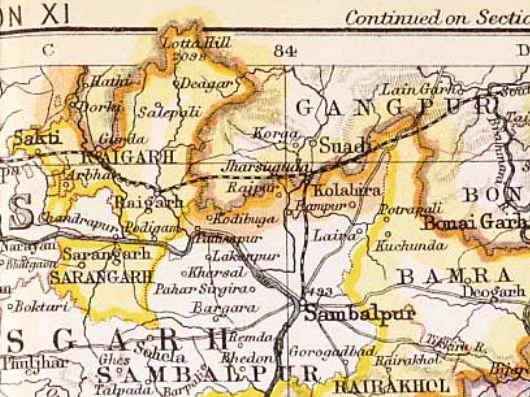
- Raigarh State in the Imperial Gazetteer of India
- Capital: Raigarh
- Area
  - 1892: 3,849 km^{2} (1,486 sq mi)
- Population
  - 1892: 128,943
- History
  - Established: 1625
  - Independence of India: 1947
| Succeeded by |
| India |
- Raigarh (Princely State)

Raigarh was a princely state in India during the British Raj. The state was ruled by a Naagvanshi Kshtriya of Gond dynasty.

== History ==
Raigarh estate was founded in 1625 by Madan Singh. He was descended from the Naagvanshi Kshtriya Gond kings of Chanda. In 1911 Raigarh estate was recognized as a state. The state had an area of 3,848 square km and a population of 174,929, according to the 1901 census. The capital of the state was the city of Raigarh, which had a population of 6,764 inhabitants in 1901.

The Rajas of Raigarh also owned the Estate of Bargarh and so held the title of Chief of Bargarh. Around 1625, the Raja of Sambalpur, created Daryo Singh as Raja of Raigarh. However, under British, it became a princely state only in 1911, during the reign of Raja Bahadur Bhup Deo Singh.

Among the notable rulers of State were Deonath Singh, who assisted the British in the Mutiny of 1857. Other rulers were Raja Bahadur Bhup Deo Singh, Raja Chakradhar Singh. Chakradhar Singh is noted for his contributions to Kathak and Hindustani music, especially for founding of Raigarh Gharana. The last ruler was Lalit Kumar Singh, his son succeeded him to the throne of Raigarh and ruled briefly before the Raigarh State was merged into Union of India on 14 December 1947. The princely states of Jashpur, Raigarh, Sakti, Sarangarh and Udaipur were united later to form the Raigarh district in present Chhattisgarh.

=== Rulers ===
==== Rajas ====
- c. 1800 - c. 1830 Jujhar Singh
- c. 1830 - 1863 Deonath Singh
- 1863 - 1890 Ganshyam Singh
- 1890 - 1911 Bhup Deo Singh (b. 1867 - d. 1917)

==== Raja Bahadurs ====
- 1911 - 22 Mar 1917 Bhup Deo Singh
- 22 Mar 1917 - Feb 1924 Natwar Singh (b. 1891 - d. 1924)
- 23 Aug 1924 – 15 Aug 1947 Lal Chakradhar Singh (b. 1905 - d. 1947)
- 15 Aug 1947 – 1 Aug 1948 Lalitkumar Singh (b 1924 - d. 2000)

== See also ==
- Eastern States Agency
