= Surendra Kumar Singh =

Surendra Kumar Singh may refer to:

- Surendra Singh (athlete) (born 1978), Indian long-distance runner
- Surendra Kumar Singh (politician) (1932–2015), Indian politician
