= Raigarh =

- City
- Raigarh
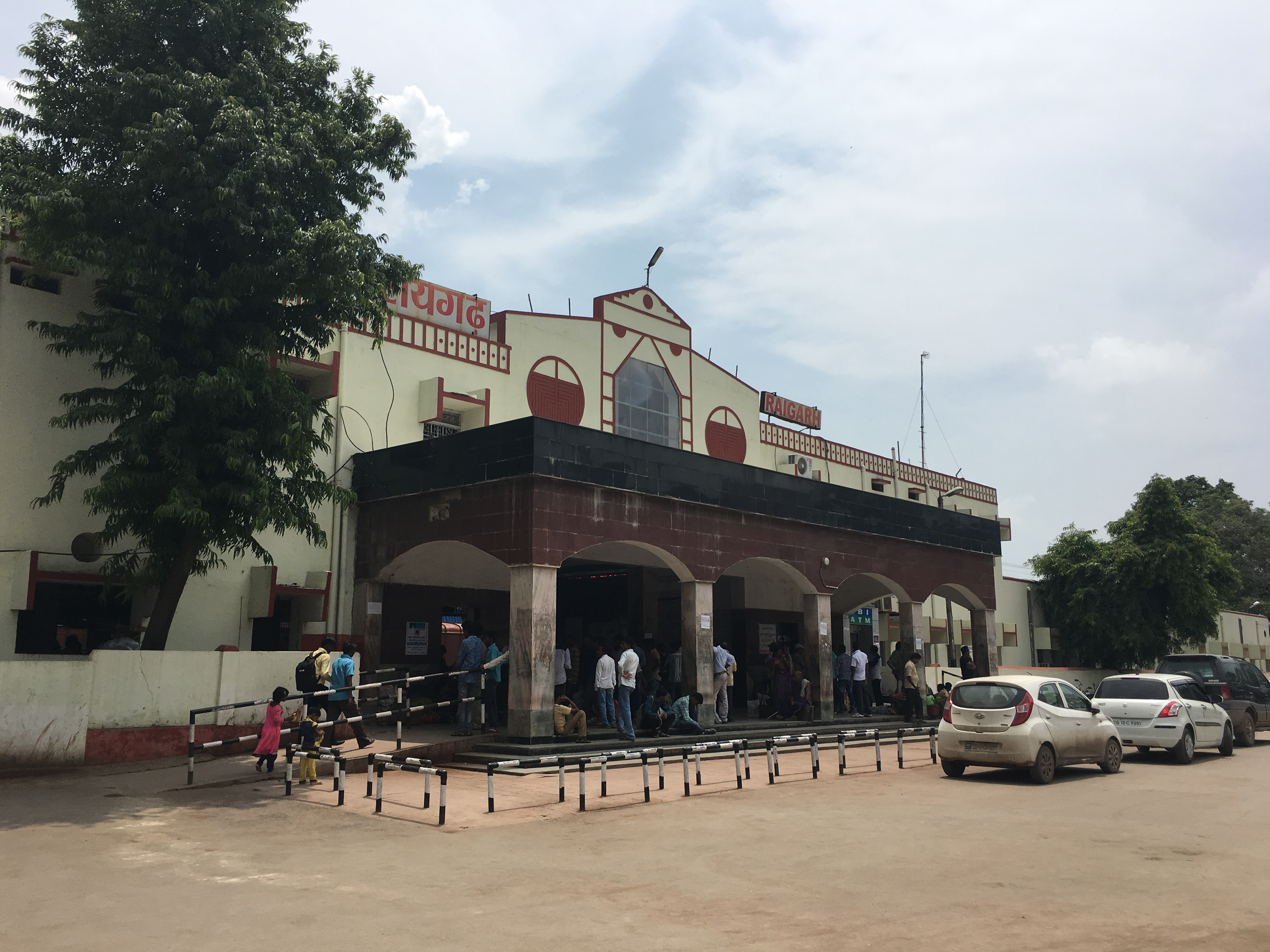
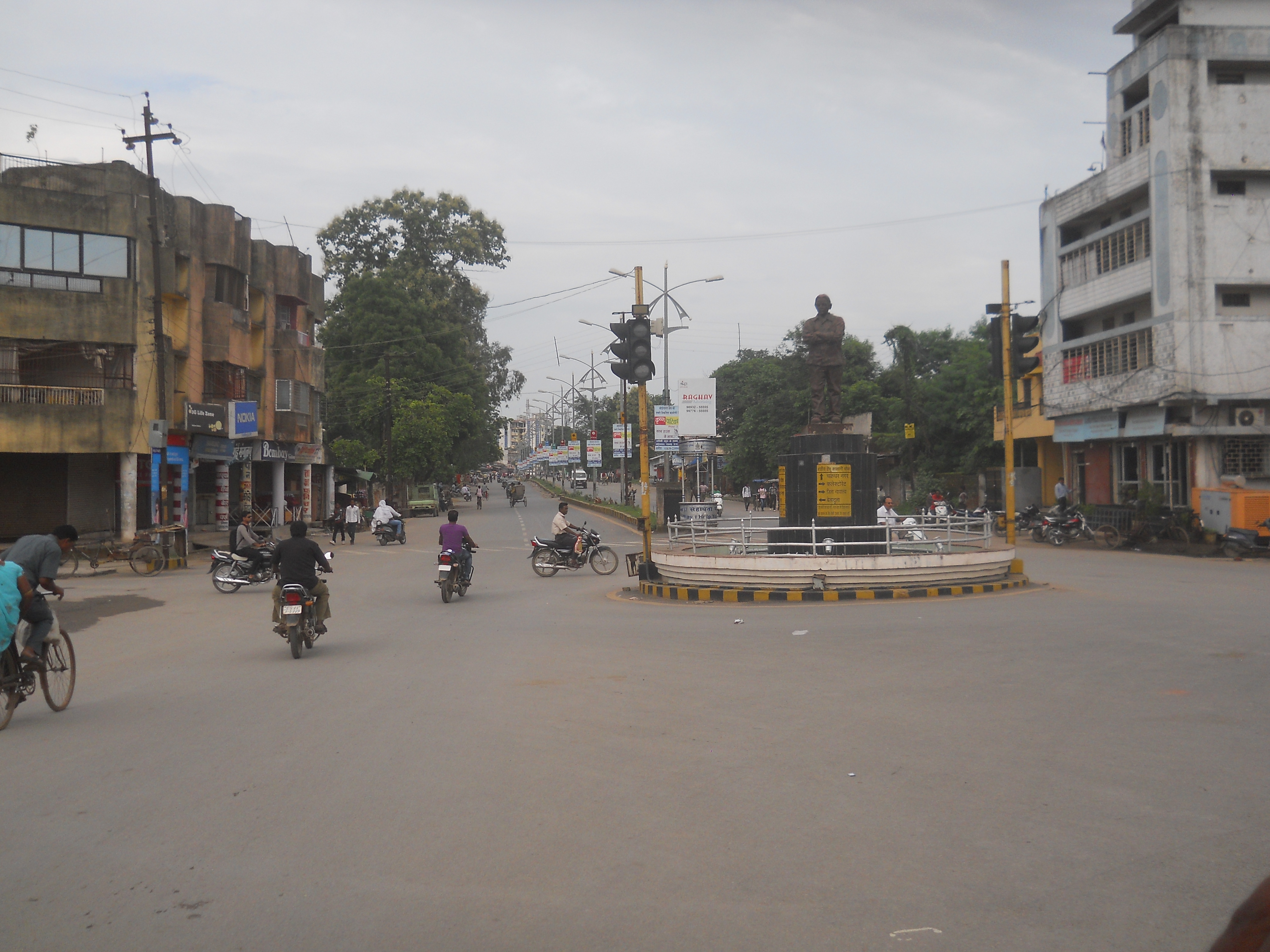
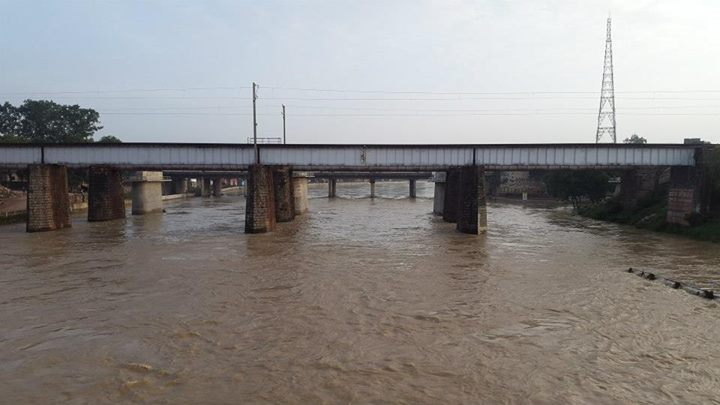
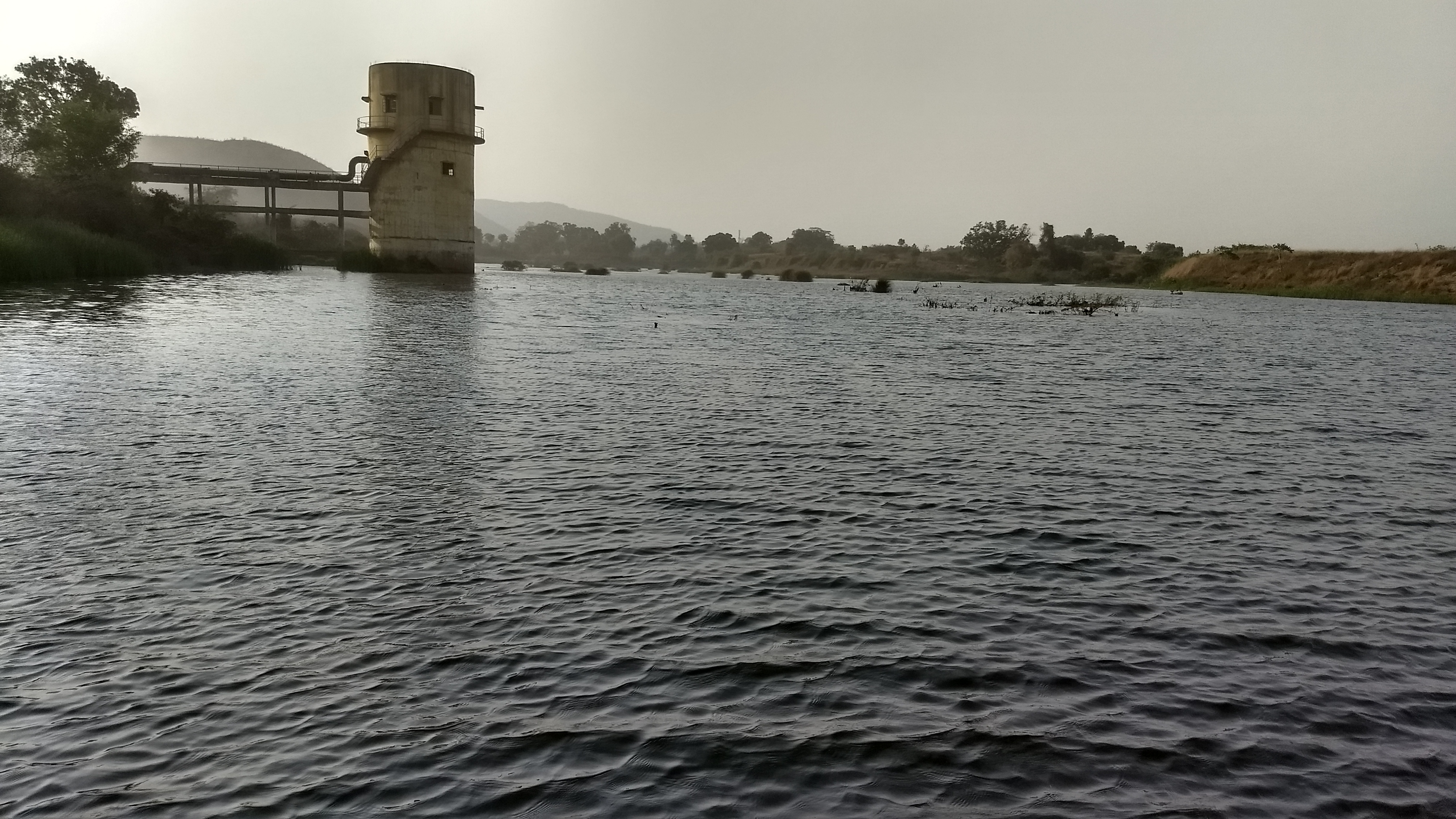
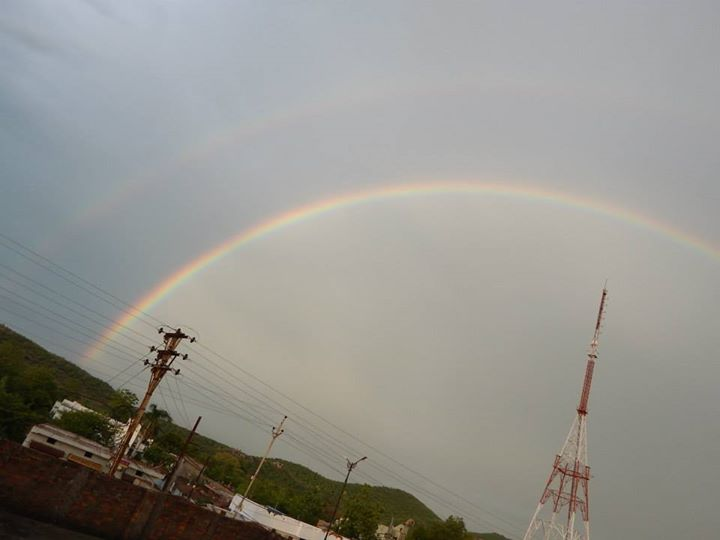
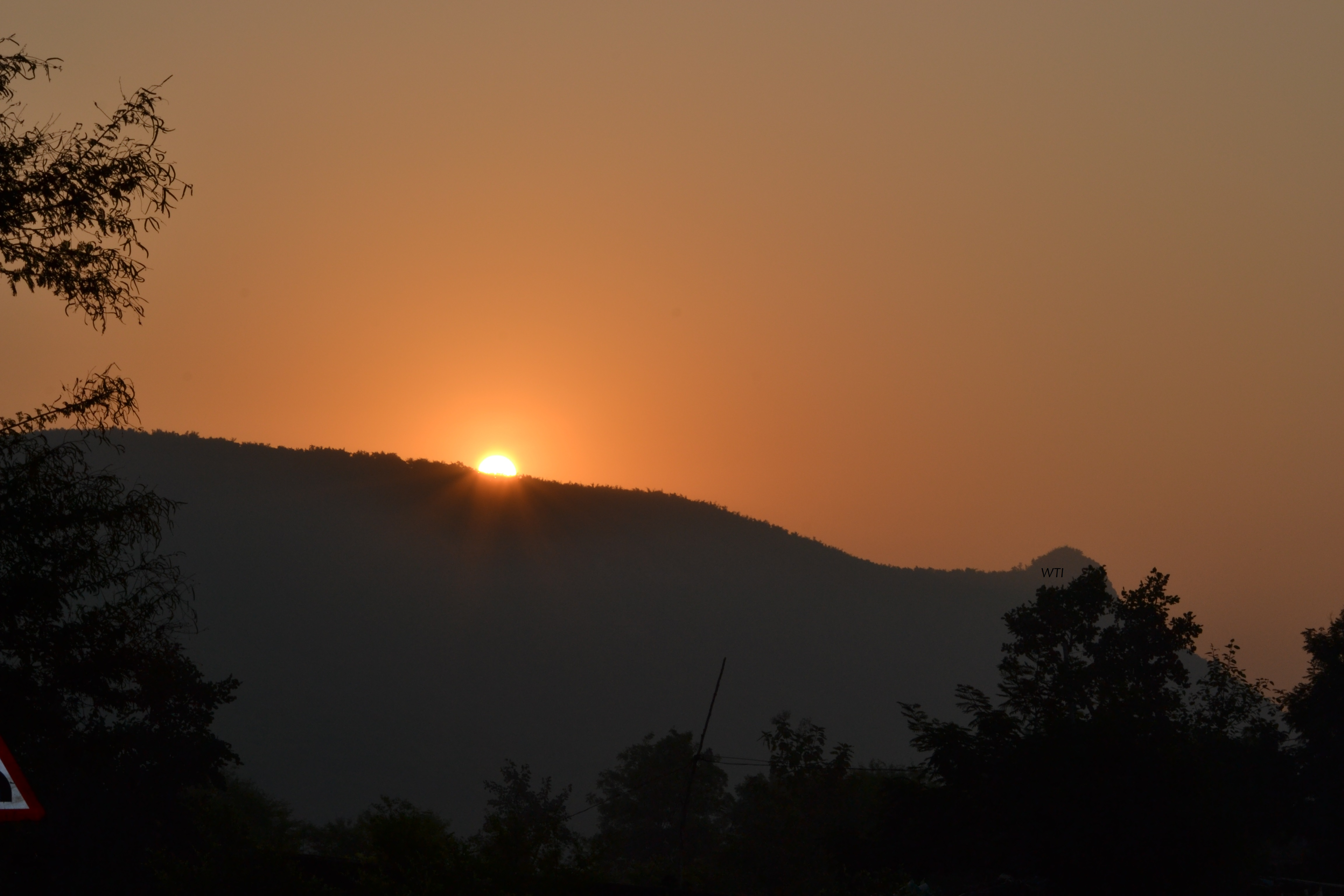
- From top, left to right: Raigarh Railway Station, Hemu kalani chowk raigarh, Kelo-River, River flows through Raigarh city, TV tower, Sunrise in Raigarh.

- Raigarh (Chhattisgarh) Raigarh (India)
- Coordinates: 21°53′50.6″N 83°23′42.0″E
- Country: India
- State: Chhattisgarh
- District: Raigarh

Government
  - Body: Raigarh (Vidhan Sabha constituency)
  - MLA: Om Prakash Choudhary (Bharatiya Janata Party)
- Elevation: 243.7 m (800 ft)

Population
  - City: 135,363
  - Rank: India 285th, Chhattisgarh 6th
  - Metro: 150,019
- Time zone: UTC+5:30 (IST)
- PIN: 496001 (Raigarh)
- Telephone code: +917762
- Vehicle registration: CG-13
- UN/LOCODE: IN RIG
- Sex ratio: 1000/985 ♂/♀
- Website: raigarh.gov.in/en/

Raigarh is a city in northern Chhattisgarh known as the 'Cultural capital of Chhattisgarh'; Raigarh is famous for its dance form “SUWA” (as Raigarh Gharana) and classical music; Raigarh is also known as Sanskritidhani.

It is also known for its coal reserves and power generation for the state and the country. With a population of just about 150,019 (2011) it is a rapidly growing industrial city. Raigarh is one of the major rice-producing districts in India.

Rich in culture and tradition, Raigarh City is the administrative headquarters of Raigarh district. Apart from its cultural heritage, the city of Raigarh is also known for its Kosa (a fine silk) and rich deposits of coal.

Raigarh is home to one of the oldest jute mills in India and is major producer of steel, iron ore and electricity in the country. The most spoken language of the people living here are Odia, Chattisgarhi and Hindi. It is rapidly emerging as an industrial city on the map of Chhattisgarh and India.

== Transportation ==
=== Railways ===
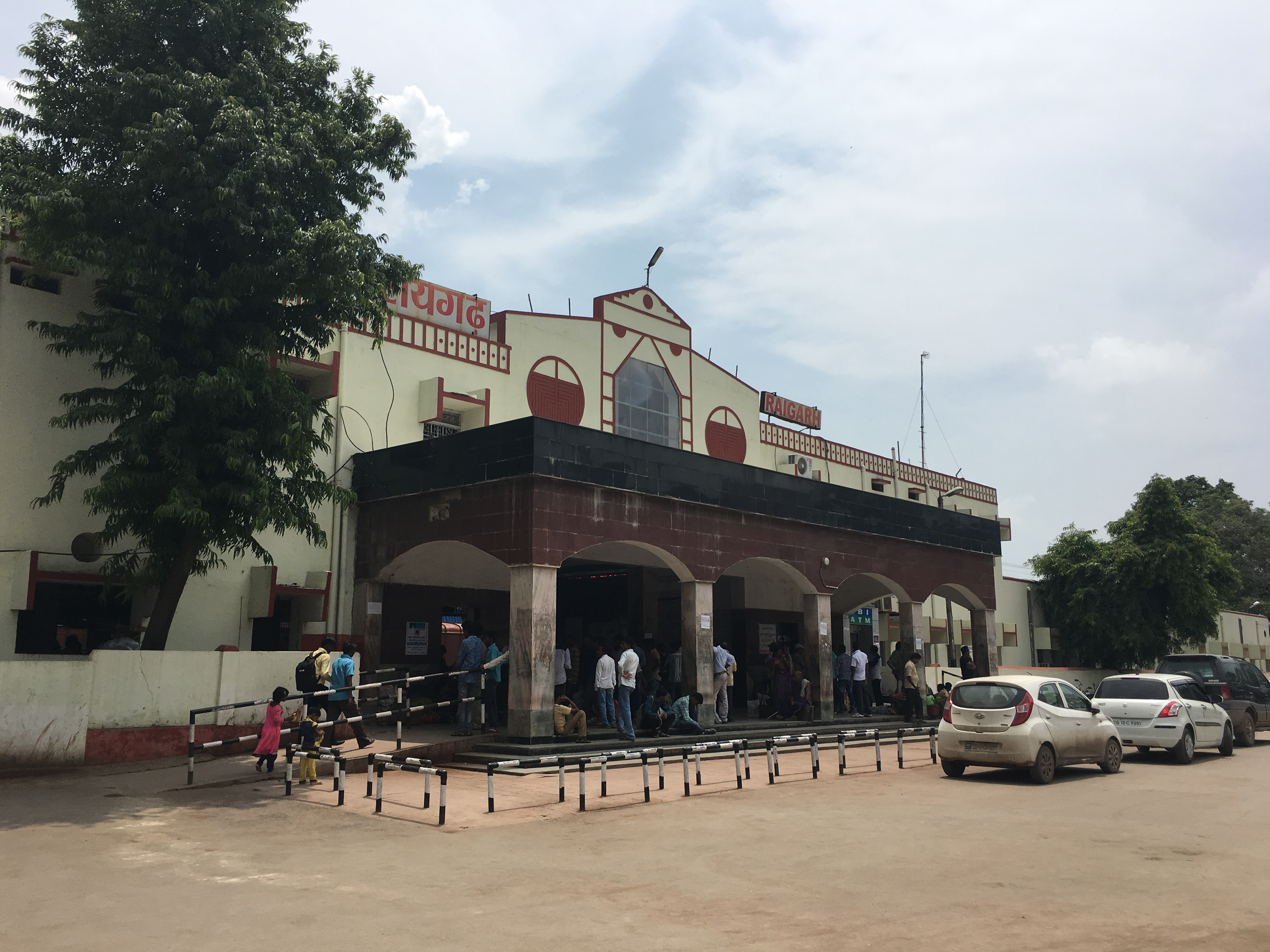
Raigarh Railway Station

Raigarh railway station is a station on the Tatanagar–Bilaspur section of Howrah-Nagpur-Mumbai line the broad gauge line. All express and some superfast trains stop here, while Gondwana express and Janshatabdi express originate at Raigarh. It is well connected with many major cities. While for other destinations, it has to depend upon Bilaspur railway station, which is a regional rail hub connected to every part of the country and 132 km from Raigarh district headquarter. Kirodimal Nagar railway station is another suburb small station of Raigarh city. Raigarh railway station serving to the people of the nearby area lie Surguja, Dharamjaigarh, Lailunga, Sarangarh. The Raigarh railway station has a good vehicle parking facility including overnight parking.

=== Road-Bus Transport ===
Raigarh has the Kevda Badi Bus Stand, which is connected to Sarangarh, Jharsuguda, Raipur, Bilaspur etc.

Raigarh is also connected to NH 49 and NH 200 which connect it to Kolkata and Odisha.

=== Airport ===
The nearest airport is Veer Surendra Sai Airport (Jharsuguda Airport, Odisha), just 95 km from Raigarh City.

Raigarh Airport, a private airport owned by the Jindal Steel and Power Limited is located 10 kilometres (6.2 mi) north-west of the city.

== History ==
The tradition preserved by the ruling family of the erstwhile state of Raigarh maintains that the Raj Gond family migrated to this region from Bairagarh/Wariagarh of Chanda district of Maharashtra state about the beginning of the eighteenth century and first stayed at Phuljhar in Raipur district. From there Madan Singh, head of the family, migrated to Banda of the present-day Raigarh. The successor kings of Raigarh state after Maharaja Madan Singh were Maharaja Takhat Singh, Maharaha Beth Singh, Maharaja Dilip Singh, Maharaja Jujhar Singh, Maharaja Devnath Singh, Maharaja Ghansyam Singh, Maharaja Bhupdev Singh, Maharaja Natwar Singh, and Maharaja Chakradhar Singh. Truly speaking music, dance, and literature got fillip during the reign of Maharaja Bhupdev Singh and developed further during the rule of Maharaja Chakradhar Singh. Prior to Indian Independence, Raigarh was capital of Princely State of Raigarh.

== Geography and climate ==
Raigarh is located at 21.9°N 83.4°E. It has an average elevation of 215 metres (705 feet). The Kelo river flows through the city, which is one of its main water sources.

The minimum-maximum temperature range is 29.5 - 49 °C in summer, and 8 - 25 °C in winter.

Climate data for Raigarh (1981–2010, extremes 1951–2008)
Month	Jan	Feb	Mar	Apr	May	Jun	Jul	Aug	Sep	Oct	Nov	Dec	Year
Record high °C (°F)	33.4 (92.1)	39.4 (102.9)	43.0 (109.4)	46.0 (114.8)	48.3 (118.9)	47.2 (117.0)	41.8 (107.2)	39.0 (102.2)	38.0 (100.4)	38.6 (101.5)	36.6 (97.9)	34.4 (93.9)	48.3 (118.9)
Mean daily maximum °C (°F)	27.9 (82.2)	30.8 (87.4)	35.5 (95.9)	39.8 (103.6)	41.4 (106.5)	37.4 (99.3)	32.2 (90.0)	31.2 (88.2)	32.2 (90.0)	32.4 (90.3)	30.3 (86.5)	28.2 (82.8)	33.3 (91.9)
Mean daily minimum °C (°F)	13.3 (55.9)	16.2 (61.2)	20.5 (68.9)	24.8 (76.6)	27.5 (81.5)	26.8 (80.2)	25.1 (77.2)	25.0 (77.0)	24.6 (76.3)	22.2 (72.0)	17.5 (63.5)	13.1 (55.6)	21.4 (70.5)
Record low °C (°F)	6.8 (44.2)	7.8 (46.0)	12.2 (54.0)	14.4 (57.9)	18.7 (65.7)	19.5 (67.1)	18.6 (65.5)	18.4 (65.1)	20.2 (68.4)	13.4 (56.1)	9.3 (48.7)	6.4 (43.5)	6.4 (43.5)
Average rainfall mm (inches)	16.7 (0.66)	16.0 (0.63)	14.3 (0.56)	14.7 (0.58)	34.5 (1.36)	202.0 (7.95)	403.5 (15.89)	401.9 (15.82)	230.7 (9.08)	46.6 (1.83)	11.3 (0.44)	2.4 (0.09)	1,394.7 (54.91)
Average rainy days	1.3	1.2	1.3	1.3	2.1	8.5	15.8	16.2	11.0	2.8	0.6	0.2	62.4
Average relative humidity (%) (at 17:30 IST)	49	40	31	26	30	53	75	79	75	62	53	51	52
Source: India Meteorological Department

== Language and demographics ==
Languages spoken are Chhattisgarhi, Hindi, and Odia. The demographics of the city consist mainly of people from Chhattisgarh, Odisha, Haryana and Bihar. A sizeable community of Bengali, Telugu and Marathi speaking people also live here.

As of 2011 India census Raigarh district had a population of 1,493,984, and the city of Raigarh a population of 137,126. Males constitute 51% of the population and females 49%. Raigarh has an average literacy rate of 87.02%, male literacy is 93.18%, and female literacy is 80.60%.

Religion in Raigarh (2011)

Religions in Raigarh (2011)
1. Hinduism (90.2%)
2. Islam (5.50%)
3. Christianity (2.99%)
4. Sikhism (0.85%)
5. Jainism (0.19%)
6. Buddhism (0.19%)
7. Others (0.02%)

Hinduism is Raigarh predominant religious faith, with 90.20% of Raigarh population, followed by Islam (5.50%), Christianity (2.99%),Sikhism (0.85%), Jainism (0.19%) and Buddhism (0.19%).

== Education ==
Average literacy rate in Raigarh district as per census 2011 is 85.22% of which males and females are 92.01% and 78.09% literates respectively. As of the 2011 Census of India, Raigarh had 55 primary schools, 37 middle schools, 9 secondary schools and 16 senior-secondary school, Shaheed Nandkumar Patel University, along with 2 arts and commerce colleges (including Kirodimal Govt. Arts and Science College ), 1 law college, 1 Medical College(Late Shri Lakhiram Agrawal Medical College ), 1 polytechnic college. O.P. Jindal University and Kirodimal Institute of Technology are newer institutions in the city.

== Notable people ==
- Raja Chakradhar Singh
- Sulakshana Pandit
- Surendra Kumar Singh
- Lalitkumar Singh
- Gomati Sai
