= Rajkumar College, Raipur =

Building in India

Coordinates: 21.2405°N 81.6138°E

Rajkumar College
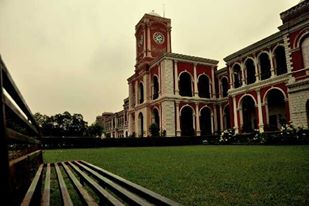
- Established: 1882; 144 years ago
- Affiliations: Council for the Indian School Certificate Examinations
- Location: G.E. Road,, Raipur, Chhattisgarh, India
- Campus: 125 acre
- Website: www.rajkumarcollege.com

Rajkumar College (or RKC) in Raipur, Chhattisgarh, is one of the oldest K-12 foundations of India. It was founded by Sir Andrew Henderson Leith Fraser in the year 1882 at Jabalpur. The School functioned at Jabalpur till 1892 and thereafter, shifted to its present site at Raipur in 1894, with boarding house facilities. Its estate is spread over 125 acres.

It is a co-education, residential cum day boarding public school affiliated to the Council for the Indian School Certificate Examinations, New Delhi and prepares the students for Indian Certificate of Secondary Education (ICSE) Class X and Indian School Certificate (ISC) Class XII examinations.

== History ==
The school was established in 1882 by the efforts of Sir Andrew Henderson Leith Fraser, KCSI and the British authorities as Rajkumar School at Jabalpur and was closed due poor facilities and location. A decision to shift it to Raipur in 1894 and renamed as Rajkumar College and founded as a Chiefs' College. RKC was created for education of sons and relatives of rulers of Chhattisgarh Feudatory States and local zamindars, who donated funds.

In 1921, it was declared as Chiefs' College. However, in 1939, on joining as a founding member of the Public School Conference, admission was opened to all boys other than from Princely States.

In 1947 the Rajkumar College became the place where the short-lived Eastern States Union was established.

== Present day ==
From 1939 to 1989, RKC was a public boys school with hostel, swimming, playground, hospital, pavilion, library, billiard room, and temple. The medium of education is English with equal emphasis on Hindi.

The college has a day school and several boarding house and buildings. The Rajendra Das Boarding House and the Balram Das Boarding House are named after the donors of the State of Nandgaon and they constitute the main building. The Tagore House, named after Rabindranath Tagore, was opened by Jawaharlal Nehru, the first prime minister of India in 1963. The college has a big dining hall, which was inaugurated by Dr. Rajendra Prasad, the first president of India. The campus houses the Koriya Museum after the main donor of the museum building, the princely state of Koriya.

=== Management ===
The school is managed by a board of trustees belonging to original founders, the descendants of feudatory states and zamindars, who have hired professionals for management and day-to-day affairs.

== See also ==
- Beacon English School
- Daly College
- Mayo College
- Rajkumar College, Rajkot
- Scindia School
