= Odisha Fire Service =

Firefighting service in India

Agency overview
- Established: 1944
- Motto: We Serve to Save

Facilities and equipment
- Stations: 153
- Trucks: 186
- Rescues: 3

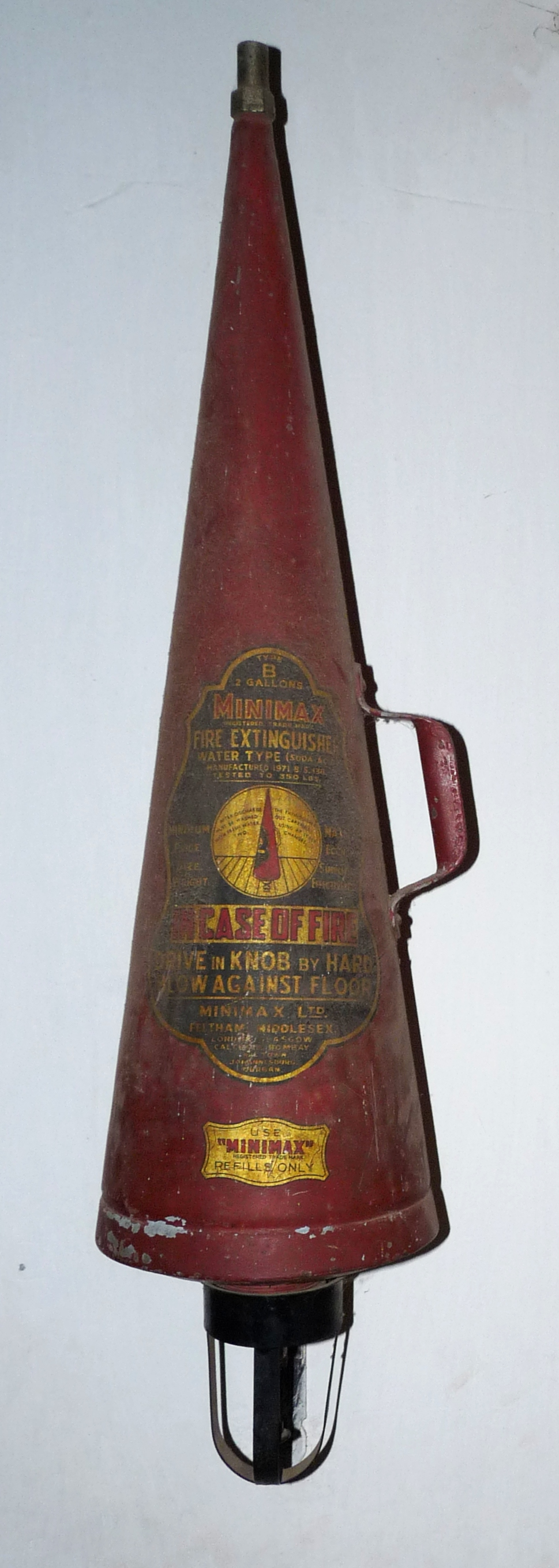
An antique fire extinguisher from the Odisha State Museum in Bhubaneswar

Odisha Fire Service (OFS) is the state owned service that attends firefighting/rescue calls throughout the Indian state of Odisha. It was established in 1944 during World War II in response to the threat of possible attacks from Japan. In 1945, it became part of the Odisha State Police. The fire service consists of 153 fire stations. As of 2008, there were 1,962 personnel with over 350 fire appliances at their disposal. OFS is headed by a Director, who has the rank of Inspector General of Police and is under the administrative control of the Odisha State Home Department. The Odisha Fire Service Act, 1993 governs the fire prevention measures, lays down fire safety norms, and also mandates the formation of a fire service.

== List of Fire Stations of Odisha Fire Service ==
Sl. No.	Year	Date of Establishment	Name of the F.S.	District	Year of Sanction
1	1944	12.04.1944	Cuttack City (Buxibazar)	Cuttack	NA
2	1944	12.04.1944	Balasore	Balasore	NA
3	1944	12.04.1944	Berhampur	Ganjam	1944
4	1944	12.04.1944	Puri	Puri	NA
5	1953	01.04.1953	Bhubaneswar (Kalpana)	Khurda	1953
6	1955	11.02.1955	Sambalpur	Sambalpur	NA
7	1955	11.02.1955	Dhenkanal	Dhenkanal	NA
8	1955	27.05.1955	Aska	Ganjam	NA
9	1955	11.10.1955	Jeypore	Koraput	NA
10	1956	10.01.1956	Sonepur	Subarnapur	1955
11	1956	10.02.1956	Bhadrak	Bhadrak	NA
12	1956	01.03.1956	Athagarh	Cuttack	NA
13	1956	12.03.1956	Khurda	Khurda	NA
14	1957	23.03.1957	Baripada	Mayurbhanj	NA
15	1957	05.04.1957	Paralakhemundi	Gajapati	NA
16	1959	12.03.1959	Nayagarh	Nayagarh	NA
17	1964	25.11.1964	Anandapur	Keonjhar	1963
18	1965	15.09.1965	Rourkela	Sundargarh	1965
19	1966	14.07.1966	G. Udayagiri	Kandhamal	NA
20	1970	02.05.1970	Burla	Sambalpur	1965
21	1970	01.06.1970	Bhawanipatna	Kalahandi	1970
22	1970	01.06.1970	Kendrapara	Kendrapara	NA
23	1970	12.08.1970	Jajpur	Jajpur	NA
24	1970	14.08.1970	Bolangir	Bolangir	1970
25	1970	05.10.1970	Baragarh	Baragarh	NA
26	1972	27.05.1972	Polosora	Ganjam	NA
27	1972	02.06.1972	Boudh	Boudh	1972
28	1972	14.06.1972	Kamakhyanagar	Dhenkanal	1972
29	1972	23.06.1972	Sundargarh	Sundargarh	NA
30	1972	26.06.1972	Keonjhar	Keonjhar	1972
31	1972	08.07.1972	Balijhari	Cuttack	NA
32	1972	07.08.1972	Banki	Cuttack	1972
33	1972	11.08.1972	Rairangpur	Mayurbhanj	1972
34	1972	28.10.1972	Angul	Angul	1972
35	1974	07.01.1974	Bhanjanagar	Ganjam	1973
36	1974	14.08.1974	Jagatsinghpur	Jagatsinghpur	1972
37	1974	27.09.1974	Rayagada	Rayagada	NA
38	1974	25.11.1974	Biramoharajpur	Subarnapur	NA
39	1975	21.01.1975	Chhatrapur	Ganjam	1973
40	1975	19.06.1975	Talcher	Angul	1973
41	1975	02.09.1975	Gunupur	Rayagada	1972
42	1976	28.01.1976	Jharsuguda	Jharsuguda	1973
43	1977	12.03.1977	Daspalla	Nayagarh	NA
44	1977	24.04.1977	Nawarangpur	Nawarangpur	1976
45	1977	01.10.1977	Balugaon	Khurda	1976
46	1978	07.08.1978	Padampur	Baragarh	1976
47	1978	07.08.1978	Karanjia	Mayurbhanj	1977
48	1978	08.09.1978	Rairakhol	Sambalpur	1977
49	1978	19.11.1978	Phulbani	Kandhamal	1977
50	1979	14.04.1979	Koraput	Koraput	1973
51	1979	25.04.1979	Bhuban	Dhenkanal	1981
52	1980	01.04.1980	Pallahara	Angul	1977
53	1980	07.04.1980	Atthamallik	Agul	1978
54	1980	12.06.1980	Malkangiri	Malkangiri	1978
55	1980	11.11.1980	Ghasipura	Keonjhar	NA
56	1981	20.01.1981	Khariar Road	Nuapada	1978
57	1981	01.02.1981	Khandapada	Nayagarh	1981
58	1981	29.08.1981	Udala	Mayurbhanj	1981
59	1981	16.10.1981	Titilagarh	Bolangir	1977
60	1982	10.05.1982	Nilagiri	Balasore	1982
61	1982	05.06.1982	Deogarh	Deogarh	1981
62	1983	22.01.1983	Hindol	Dhenkanal	1982
63	1983	13.04.1983	Patnagarh	Bolangir	1981
64	1983	30.05.1983	Kuchinda	Sambalpur	1982
65	1983	08.07.1983	Dharmagarh	Kalahandi	1982
66	1983	24.08.1983	Champua	Keonjhar	1982
67	1983	12.12.1983	Bonai	Sundargarh	1982
68	1984	23.02.1984	Baliguda	Kandhamal	1982
69	1984	12.05.1984	Jajpur Road	Jajpur	1984
70	1985	02.02.1985	Tangi	Khurda	1984
71	1985	04.02.1985	Soro	Balasore	1984
72	1985	19.04.1985	Nimapara	Puri	1984
73	1985	29.04.1985	Chandikhol	Jajpur	1984
74	1985	25.09.1985	Kantamal	Boudh	NA
75	1986	01.11.1985	Panposh	Sundargarh	1982
76	1986	22.08.1986	Digapahandi	Ganjam	1985
77	1986	05.10.1986	Sorada	Ganjam	NA
78	1987	08.05.1987	Ranpur	Nayagarh	1985
79	1987	01.06.1987	Salipur	Cuttack	1982
80	1987	17.06.1987	Dhamnagar	Bhadrak	1987
81	1987	01.08.1987	Hatadihi	Keonjhar	1988–89
82	1987	22.10.1987	Kujanga	Jagatsinghpur	1985
83	1988	10.01.1988	Odagaon	Nayagarh	1987
84	1988	04.02.1988	Parjang	Dhenkanal	1987
85	1988	04.02.1988	Gondia	Dhenkanal	NA
86	1988	02.04.1988	Hindol Road	Dhenkanal	1989–90
87	1988	02.04.1988	Khajuriakata	Dhenkanal	1989
88	1988	24.06.1988	Bologarh	Khurda	1988–89
89	1988	23.12.1988	Basta	Balasore	1989–90
90	1989	05.01.1989	Kodala	Ganjam	1991
91	1989	05.01.1989	Khalikote	Ganjam	1991–92
92	1989	08.01.1989	R.Udayagiri	Gajapati	1991
93	1989	25.02.1989	Rampur	Subarnapur	NA
94	1992	05.11.1992	Ib-Thermal	Jharsuguda	1992–93
95	1993	12.02.1993	Hinjilikat	Ganjam	1992–93
96	1993	28.02.1993	Kotpada	Koraput	1992
97	1994	01.05.1994	Rajkanika	Kendrapara	1993
98	1994	12.06.1994	Pattamundei	Kendrapara	1994–95
99	1994	25.11.1994	Mohana	Gajapati	1994–95
100	1995	01.01.1995	Basudevpur	Bhadrak	1994–95
101	1995	27.03.1995	Begunia	Khurda	1994–95
102	1995	03.04.1995	Chhendipada	Angul	1994–95
103	1995	20.09.1995	Brahmagiri	Puri	1995
104	1995	25.10.1995	Chandrasekharpur	Khurda	1995
105	1996	22.01.1996	Betanati	Mayuarbhanj	1995
106	1996	01.02.1996	Pipili	Puri	1996
107	1996	16.02.1996	Tirtol	Jagatsinghpur	1995
108	1996	16.02.1996	Jatani	Khurda	1996
109	1996	13.03.1996	Tarava	Subarnapur	1995
110	1996	13.03.1996	Rasol	Dhenkanal	1995
111	1996	11.03.1996	Patrapur	Ganjam	1995
112	1996	25.10.1996	Jaleswar	Balasore	1995–96
113	1997	26.10.1997	Bissam Cuttack	Rayagada	1998
114	1998	01.01.1998	Chauliaganj	Cuttack	1995
115	2001	31.01.2001	Khariar	Nuapada	2002
116	2001	17.08.2001	Purusottampur	Ganjam	2002
117	2001	20.08.2001	Rasagovindpur	Mayurbhanj	2002
118	2001	21.08.2001	Khaira	Balasore	2002
119	2001	23.08.2001	Bamur	Angul	2002
120	2001	29.08.2001	Kuanpal	Cuttack	2002
121	2001	30.08.2001	Korua	Kendrapara	2002
122	2001	30.08.2001	Gadi	Bhadrak	2002
123	2001	01.10.2001	Barkote	Deogarh	2002
124	2001	05.10.2001	Lakhanpur	Jharsuguda	2002
125	2001	14.10.2001	Raikia	Kandhamal	2002
126	2001	15.10.2001	Kesinga	Kalahandi	2002
127	2001	15.10.2001	Gumuda	Rayagada	2002
128	2001	15.10.2001	Ghatagaon	Keonjhar	2002
129	2001	15.10.2001	Boriguma	Koraput	2002
130	2001	15.10.2001	Kasinagar	Gajapati	2002
131	2001	09.11.2001	Dhamra	Bhadrak	2002
132	2001	10.11.2001	Joda	Keonjhar	2002
133	2001	26.11.2001	Kutra	Sundargarh	2002
134	2001	30.11.2001	Rengali	Sambalpur	2002
135	2001	13.12.2001	Tigiria	Cuttack	2002
136	2001	13.12.2001	Balipatna	Khurda	2002
137	2001	15.12.2001	Raghunathpur	Jagatsinghpur	2002
138	2001	19.12.2001	Gudvella	Bolangir	2002
139	2001	20.12.2001	Kalimela	Malkangiri	2002
140	2001	20.12.2001	Umerkote	Nawarangpur	2002
141	2001	20.12.2001	Bari	Jajpur	2002
142	2001	20.12.2001	Dasarathpur	Jajpur	2002
143	2001	21.12.2001	Ullunda	Subarnapur	2002
144	2001	22.12.2001	Bhapur	Nayagarh	2002
145	2001	24.12.2001	Barpali	Bargarh	2002
146	2001	28.12.2001	Kankadahad	Dhenkanal	2002
147	2002	05.01.2002	Adaspur	Cuttack	2002
148	2002	08.01.2002	Astaranga	Puri	2002
149	2003	03.02.2003	Sukinda	Jajpur	2003–04
150	2003	30.03.2003	Binjharpur	Jajpur	2003–04
151	2003	30.03.2003	Chandabali	Bhadrak	2003–04
152	2003	30.03.2003	Kalapathar	Cuttack	2003–04
153	2003	30.03.2003	Naktideul	Sambalpur	2003–04
154	2008	04.04.2008	Baunsuni	Boudh	2008–09
155	2008	14.10.2008	Bangiriposhi	Mayurbhanj	2008–09
156	2008	14.10.2008	Saraskana	Mayurbhanj	2008–09
157	2008	15.10.2008	Jashipur	Mayurbhanj	2008–09
158	2008	15.10.2008	Kusumi	Mayurbhanj	2008–09
159	2008	17.10.2008	Bhograi	Balasore	2008–09
160	2008	22.10.2008	Jagannathprasad	Ganjam	2008–09
161	2008	30.10.2008	Tentulikhunti	Nawarangpur	2008–09
162	2009	09.01.2009	Kaniha	Angul	2008–09
163	2009	06.02.2009	Baliapal	Balasore	2008–09
164	2009	10.02.2009	Aul	Kendrapara	2009–10
165	2009	22.02.2009	Badamba	Cuttack	2009–10
166	2009	28.02.2009	Satyabadi (Sakhigopal)	Puri	2009–10
167	2009	14.07.2009	Secretariat	Khurda	2009–10
168	2009	10.08.2009	Jhumpura	Keonjhar	2008–09
169	2009	21.09.2009	Charichhak (Harabhanga)	Boudh	2008–09
170	2009	31.10.2009	Ada	Balasore	2009–10
171	2009	02.10.2009	Chandahandi	Nawarangpur	2008–09
172	2009	30.12.2009	Krushnaprasad (Maluda)	Puri	2009–10
173	2010	23.01.2010	Abhinav Bidanasi (CDA)	Cuttack	2008–09
174	2010	26.02.2010	Kabisuryanagar	Ganjam	2009–10
175	2010	01.06.2010	Jagannath Temple	Puri	2009–10
176	2010	10.11.2010	Paikmal	Baragarh	2009–10
177	2010	22.11.2010	Agarpada	Bhadrak	2009–10
178	2011	12.02.2011	Telkoi	Keonjhar	2009–10
179	2011	13.12.2011	Nischintakoili	Cuttack	2010–11
180	2011	22.12.2011	Remuna	Balasore	2009–10
181	2012	09.01.2012	Nuapada	Nuapada	2009–10
182	2013	12.02.2013	Kanas	Puri	2012–13
183	2013	09.03.2013	Laxmipur	Koraput	2009–10
184	2013	11.04.2013	Balikuda	Jagatsinghpur	2009–10
185	2013	06.05.2013	Banapur	Khurda	2010–11
186	2013	16.08.2013	Lephripada	Sundargarh	2009–10
187	2013	16.08.2013	Khajuripada	Kandhamal	2009–10
188	2013	16.08.2013	Derabis	Kendrapara	2010–11
189	2013	16.08.2013	Rajnagar	Kendrapara	2011–12
190	2013	16.08.2013	Ersama	Jagatsinghpur	2009–10
191	2013	16.08.2013	Govindpur	Sambalpur	2009–10
192	2013	16.08.2013	Bahalda	Mayurbhanj	2009–10
193	2013	16.08.2013	Rasulpur	Jajpur	2009–10
194	2013	17.08.2013	Bhandaripokhari	Bhadrak	2010–11
195	2013	21.08.2013	Baitarani Road	Jajpur	2010–11
196	2013	21.08.2013	Tiring	Mayurbhanj	2010–11
197	2013	22.08.2013	Suliapada	Mayurbhanj	2011–12
198	2013	28.08.2013	Sohela	Baragarh	2009–10
199	2013	28.08.2013	Chakapada	Kandhamal	2010–11
200	2013	28.08.2013	Phiringia	Kandhamal	2011–12
201	2013	30.08.2013	Reamal	Deogarh	2010–11
202	2013	30.08.2013	Sheragada	Ganjam	2010–11
203	2013	30.08.2013	Kalyansinghpur	Rayagada	2010–11
204	2013	30.08.2013	Dabugaon	Nawarangpur	2011–12
205	2013	30.08.2013	Narayanpatna	Koraput	2011–12
206	2013	30.08.2013	Kudumuluguma	Malkangiri	2011–12
207	2013	31.08.2013	Baranga	Cuttack	2009–10
208	2013	02.09.2013	Kanisi (Gopalpur)	Ganjam	2011–12
209	2013	03.09.2013	Dunguripali	Subarnaur	2009–10
210	2013	10.09.2013	Oupada	Balasore	2011–12
211	2013	11.09.2013	Khunta	Mayurbhanj	2011–12
212	2013	14.09.2013	Kukudakhandi	Ganjam	2010–11
213	2013	16.09.2013	Gania	Nayagarh	2009–10
214	2013	16.09.2013	Agalpur	Bolangir	2009–10
215	2013	08.11.2013	Tangi-Choudwar	Cuttack	2009–10
216	2013	10.11.2013	Gaisilet	Bargarh	2011–12
217	2013	17.11.2013	Barbil	Keonjhar	2009–10
218	2013	23.11.2013	Garadpur	Kendrapara	2009–10
219	2013	23.11.2013	Similiguda	Koraput	2010–11
220	2013	24.11.2013	Jujumura	Sambalpur	2011–12
221	2013	24.11.2013	Binika	Subarnapur	2012–13
222	2013	24.11.2013	Chikiti	Ganjam	2011–12
223	2013	24.11.2013	Nuagaon	Nayagarh	2010–11
224	2013	26.11.2013	Lanjigarh	Kalahandi	2010–11
225	2013	29.11.2013	Naugaon	Jagatsinghpur	2011–12
226	2013	01.12.2013	Attabira	Baragarh	2010–11
227	2013	08.12.2013	Balianta	Khurda	2012–13
228	2013	09.12.2013	Gop	Puri	2011–12
229.	2013	09.12.2013	Laikera	Jharsuguda	2011–12
230.	2013	10.12.2013	Junagarh	Kalahandi	2011–12
231.	2013	11.12.2013	Patna	Keonjhar	2011–12
232	2013	11.12.2013	Bangomunda	Bolangir	2013–14
233	2013	13.12.2013	Subdega	Sundargarh	2011–12
234	2013	13.12.2013	Buguda	Ganjam	2011–12
235	2013	15.12.2013	Khaprakhol	Bolangir	2011–12
236	2013	18.12.2013	Raighar	Nawarangpur	2011–12
237	2013	19.12.2013	Balisankara	Sundargarh	2011–12
238	2013	20.12.2013	Kalampur	Kalahandi	2011–12
239	2013	20.12.2013	Muniguda	Rayagada	2010–11
240	2013	22.12.2013	Kuarmunda	Sundargarh	2013–14
241	2013	27.12.2013	Barasahi	Mayurbhanj	2012–13
242	2013	27.12.2013	Jharigaon	Nawarangpur	2010–11
243	2013	28.12.2013	Komna	Nuapada	2011–12
244	2013	29.12.2013	Biridi	Jagatsinghpur	2012–13
245	2013	30.12.2013	Gangadharpur	Khurda	2012–13
246	2013	30.12.2013	Jaypatna	Kalahandi	2011–12
247	2013	30.12.2013	Maneswar	Sambalpur	2012–13
248	2013	30.12.2013	Bhatli	Baragarh	2012–13
249	2013	31.12.2013	Dharmasala	Jajpur	2011–12
250	2013	31.12.2013	Narasinghpur	Cuttack	2011–12
251	2014	15.02.2014	Delang	Puri	2013–14
252	2014	27.06.2014	Thakurmunda	Mayurbhanj	2011–12
253	2014	27.06.2014	Purunabaripada	Mayurbhanj	2013–14
254	2014	29.06.2014	Dampada	Cuttack	2011–12
255	2014	29.06.2014	Niali	Cuttack	2013–14
256	2014	29.06.2014	Nandahandi	Nawarangpur	2013–14
257	2014	29.06.2014	Dharakote	Ganjam	2012–13
258	2014	29.06.2014	Mathili	Malkangiri	2011–12
259	2014	29.06.2014	Bheden	Baragarh	2011–12
260	2014	29.06.2014	Ambabhona	Baragrh	2012–13
261	2014	29.06.2014	Hemgiri	Sundargarh	2013–14
262	2014	30.06.2014	Loisingha	Bolangir	2012–13
263	2014	10.12.2014	Mahakalapara	Kendrapara	2012–13
264	2015	02.06.2015	Banarpal	Angul	2012–13
265	2015	02.06.2015	Tangarpali	Sundargarh	2013–14
266	2015	02.06.2015	Baragaon	Sundargarh	2012–13
267	2015	02.06.2015	Koira	Sundargarh	2013–14
268	2015	02.06.2015	Nuagaon	Sundargarh	2011–12
269	2015	02.06.2015	Saintala	Bolangir	2011–12
270	2015	02.06.2015	Deogaon	Bolangir	2012–13
271	2015	11.06.2015	Danagadi	Jajpur	2012–13
272	2015	18.07.2015	Harichandanpur	Keonjhar	2012–13
273	2015	18.07.2015	Aharpada	Keonjhar	2013–14
274	2015	18.07.2015	Kolabira	Jharsuguda	2012–13
275	2015	18.07.2015	Bijepur	Baragarh	2013–14
276	2015	18.07.2015	Belapara	Bolangir	2011–12
277	2015	24.08.2015	Chitrada	Mayurbhanj	2013–14
278	2015	01.09.2015	Kosagumuda	Nawarangpur	2012–13
279	2015	05.09.2015	Marshaghai	Kendrapara	2012–13
280	2015	05.10.2015	Bisoi	Mayurbhanj	2013–14
281	2015	05.10.2015	Raruan	Mayurbhanj	2013–14
282	2015	19.10.2015	Kaptipada	Mayurbhanj	2012–13
283	2015	13.12.2015	Rambha	Ganjam	2012–13
284	2016	04.01.2016	Jamda	Mayurbhanj	2012–13
285	2016	05.01.2016	Sukuruli	Mayurbhanj	2012–13
286	2016	07.01.2016	Papadahandi	Nawrangpur	2012–13
287	2016	08.01.2016	Potangi	Koraput	2011–12
288	2016	12.02.2016	Rairangpur-II (Bijatola)	Mayurbhanj	2013–14
289	2016	25.02.2016	Korkunda	Malkangiri	2013–14
290	2016	15.03.2016	Kotagarh	Kandhamal	2011–12
291	2016	28.04.2016	Bansapal	Keonjhar	2010–11
292	2016	04.05.2016	Khairaput	Malkangiri	2013–14
293	2016	27.06.2016	Balidiha	Mayurbhanj	2013–14
294	2016	29.06.2016	SCB MC&H, Cuttack	Cuttack	2016–17
295	2016	29.06.2016	MKCGMC&H, BPR	Ganjam	2016–17
296	2016	29.06.2016	VSSMC&H, SBP	Sambalpur	2016–17
297	2016	05.10.2016	Champahar	Puri	2012–13
298	2016	10.10.2016	Kantabanji	Bolangir	2012–13
299	2016	28.10.2016	Mohimunda	Bolangir	2013–14
300	2016	28.10.2016	Muribahal	Bolangir	2013–14
301	2016	31.10.2016	Daringibadi	Kandhamal	2013–14
302	2016	13.12.2016	Kokasara	Kalahandi	2012–13
303	2016	23.12.2016	Dasamantapur	Koraput	2013–14
304	2016	23.12.2016	Tumudibandha	Kandhamal	2013–14
305	2016	23.12.2016	Sarangagada	Kandhamal	2013–14
306	2016	23.12.2016	Tikabali	Kandhamal	2012–13
307	2016	23.12.2016	Kirimira	Jharsuguda	2013–14
308	2016	23.12.2016	Lahunipada	Sundargarh	2012–13
309	2016	23.12.2016	Gurundia	Sundargarh	2013–14
310	2016	23.12.2016	Tihidi	Bhadrak	2016–17
311	2016	23.12.2016	Kundra	Koraput	2012–13
312	2016	23.12.2016	Baipariguda	Koraput	2012–13
313	2016	23.12.2016	Padmapur	Rayagada	2013–14
314	2016	23.12.2016	Sanakhemundi	Ganjam	2012–13
315	2016	23.12.2016	Narla	Kalahandi	2012–13
316	2016	23.12.2016	M.Rampur	Kalahandi	2013–14
317	2016	23.12.2016	Karlamunda	Kalahandi	2013–14
318	2017	19.08.2017	Sinapalli	Nuapada	2012–13
319	2017	07.09.2017	Bandhugaon	Koraput	2013–14
320	2017	09.12.2017	Golamunda	Kalahandi	2012–13
321	2017	10.12.2017	Boden	Nuapada	2013–14
322	2017	10.12.2017	T.Rampur	Kalahandi	2013–14
323	2017	14.12.2017	Podia	Malkangiri	2013–14
324	2017	25.12.2017	Nandapur	Koraput	2013–14
325	2018	06.02.2018	Rayagada	Gajapati	2012–13
326	2018	13.04.2018	Nuagada	Gajapati	2013–14
327	2018	22.05.2018	Guma	Gajapati	2011–12
328	2018	23.05.2018	Lamptaput	Koraput	2011–12
329	2018	25.05.2018	Kashipur	Rayagada	2013–14
330	2018	01.06.2018	Gudari	Rayagada	2011–12
331	2018	08.06.2018	Jharbandh	Bargarh	2012–13
332	2018	14.06.2018	Belaguntha	Ganjam	2012–13
333	2018	30.06.2018	Kolnara (Therubali)	Rayagada	2013–14
334	2018	27.07.2018	Rajgangpur	Sundargarh	2009–10
335	2018	29.07.2018	Bisra	Sundargarh	2013–14
336	2018	14.11.2018	Jamankira	Sambalpur	2012–13
337	2019	06.09.2019	Chandrapur	Rayagada	2011–12
338	2020	04.02.2020	Bahanaga	Balasore	2012–13
339	2021	15.08.2021	AIIMS, BBSR	Khurda	2021–22
340	2022	18.05.2022	Chandua	Mayurbhanj	2013–14
341	2022	18.05.2022	Chitrakonda	Malkangiri	2021–22
342	2022	28.06.2022	Baruan	Jajpur	2016–17
