= Nuagada Block =

CD Block in the Gajapati district of Indian State of Odisha

Nuagada
- CD Block and Tehsil
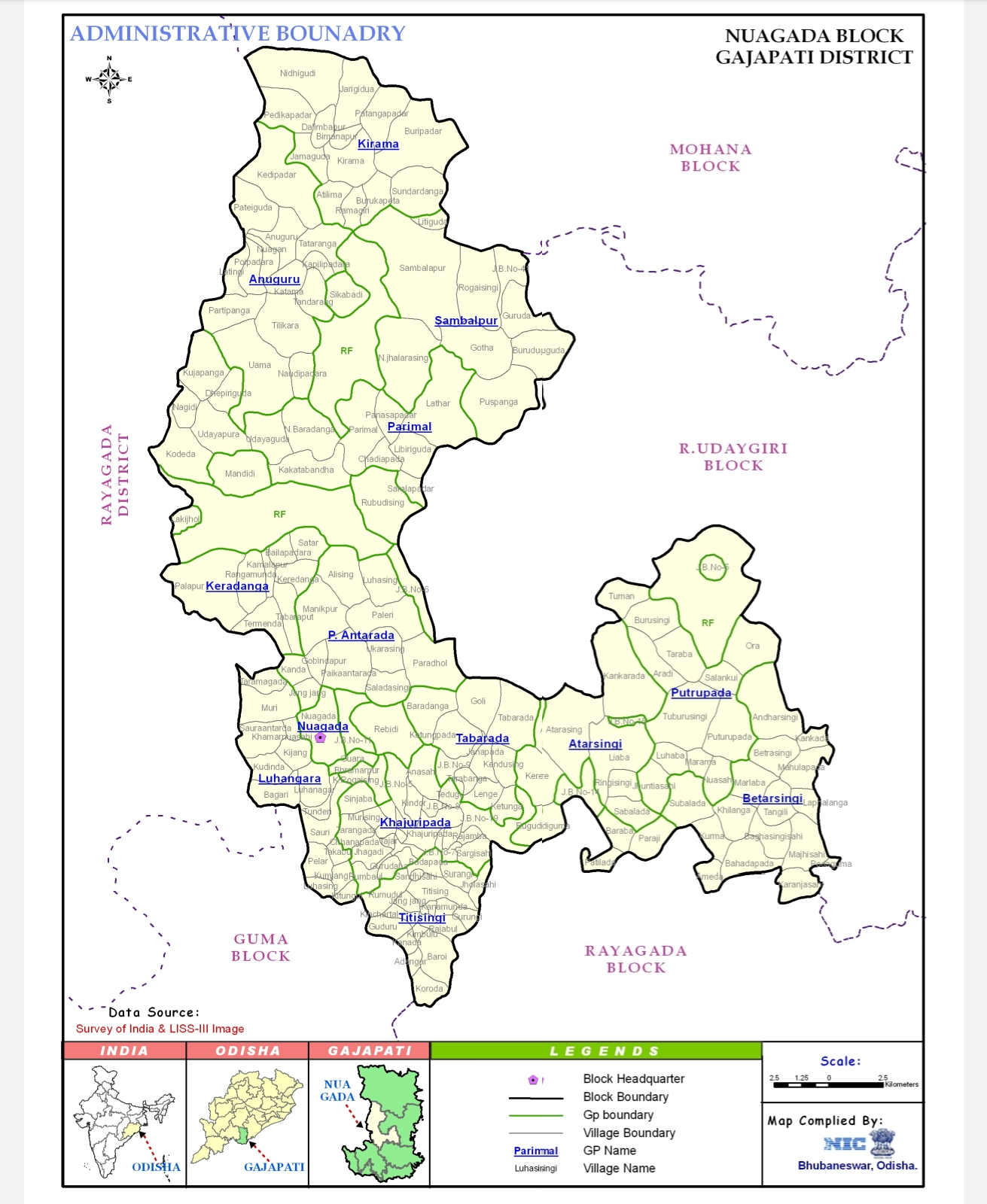

- Location in Odisha, India Nuagada (India) Nuagada (Asia) Nuagada (Earth)
- Coordinates: 19.100015°N 84.048013°E
- Country: India
- State: Odisha
- District: Gajapati
- Established: 1st April 1955
- Founder: Government of Odisha

Government
  - Type: Local Government (Tier 3)
  - Body: Nuagada Panchayat Samiti
  - MLA: Shri Dasarathi Gamango INC

Area
  - Total: 587.86 km^{2} (226.97 sq mi)
  - Rank: 4th in the District

Population (2020)
  - Total: 57,027
  - Rank: 6th in the District
  - Density: 97/km^{2} (250/sq mi)
- Demonym: Nuagadia

Languages
  - Official: Odia; English

Languages
- Time zone: UTC+5:30 (IST)
- PIN: 761214
- Telephone code: 06817
- Website: odisha.gov.in

Nuagada is a village and Community Development Block in the Gajapati District of Odisha state in India. The Block comes under the administrative control of Serango and R.Udayagiri Police station.

Mohana (Odisha Vidhan Sabha constituency) (Sl. No.: 136) is its Vidhan Sabha constituency. This constituency includes Mohana block, R.Udayagiri block, Nuagada block and Rayagada block.

== Overview ==
Nuagada Tehsil commenced operations on 1 April 2011, following its administrative bifurcation from the erstwhile R. Udayagiri Tehsil. The administrative headquarters of the tehsil is located in Nuagada village.

The tehsil comprises seven Revenue Inspector (RI) circles, 19 Gram Panchayats, and 175 villages, encompassing a total geographical area of 463.89 square kilometres (179.11 sq mi). It is geographically bounded by the R. Udayagiri, Rayagada, and Mohana tehsils, as well as the adjacent Rayagada district. Hilly and highland terrain accounts for approximately 70% of the total land area within the tehsil.

According to the 2011 Census of India, Nuagada Tehsil had a total population of 54,696, consisting of 26,684 males and 28,012 females. The demographic composition included 228 members of the Scheduled Castes and 42,145 members of the Scheduled Tribes. The jurisdictional limits of the tehsil contain 174 revenue villages in total.

== Climate ==
Nuagada block features a tropical monsoon climate heavily influenced by its higher-altitude terrain within the Eastern Ghats, experiencing cooler winters and slightly lower average summer maximums than the coastal plains of southern Odisha.

- Temperature: Temperatures peak in May with mean highs of 39.0 °C (102.2 °F), while winter minimums drop to an average of 14.0 °C (57.2 °F) in January due to seasonal cold waves across the hilly interior.
- Precipitation: The block experiences highly concentrated monsoonal rain between June and September, yielding an average annual precipitation total of 1,495.2 millimetres (58.87 in) distributed over roughly 71 rainy days.

Climate data for Nuagada CD Block
Month	Jan	Feb	Mar	Apr	May	Jun	Jul	Aug	Sep	Oct	Nov	Dec	Year
Mean daily maximum °C (°F)	32.0 (89.6)	33.0 (91.4)	34.0 (93.2)	36.0 (96.8)	39.0 (102.2)	35.0 (95.0)	32.0 (89.6)	32.0 (89.6)	32.0 (89.6)	32.0 (89.6)	31.0 (87.8)	30.0 (86.0)	33.2 (91.8)
Mean daily minimum °C (°F)	14.0 (57.2)	16.0 (60.8)	19.0 (66.2)	24.0 (75.2)	29.0 (84.2)	28.0 (82.4)	27.0 (80.6)	27.0 (80.6)	26.0 (78.8)	23.0 (73.4)	20.0 (68.0)	16.0 (60.8)	22.4 (72.3)
Average precipitation mm (inches)	12.4 (0.49)	17.4 (0.69)	18.6 (0.73)	15.0 (0.59)	40.3 (1.59)	150.0 (5.91)	282.1 (11.11)	272.8 (10.74)	180.0 (7.09)	93.0 (3.66)	33.0 (1.30)	18.6 (0.73)	1,495.2 (58.87)
Average precipitation days	0.6	1.1	1.3	1.5	3.8	9.8	14.8	14.2	11.5	5.2	1.8	0.8	71.4
Average relative humidity (%)	66	68	70	73	74	81	86	87	85	80	71	65	75
Average dew point °C (°F)	13.2 (55.8)	14.8 (58.6)	17.1 (62.8)	20.2 (68.4)	23.6 (74.5)	24.5 (76.1)	24.3 (75.7)	24.4 (75.9)	24.1 (75.4)	21.3 (70.3)	17.0 (62.6)	13.9 (57.0)	19.9 (67.8)
Source 1: India Meteorological Department
Source 2: Central Ground Water Board

== Education ==
Nuagada block has an educational infrastructure comprising 93 elementary schools, 13 high schools, and 3 higher secondary school located in Khajuripada. Private education in the block includes the De Paul School in Khajuripada, which operates as a branch of the De Paul School in Brahmapur.

== Economy ==
The economy of Nuagada block is primarily agrarian, with a significant reliance on rain-fed agriculture and the collection of minor forest produce due to its hilly topography.

=== Agriculture ===
Agriculture supports the livelihood of the majority of the population, though arable land is limited by the rugged terrain of the Eastern Ghats.

- Cropping Pattern: The block falls under the North Eastern Ghats agro-climatic zone. The primary Kharif crop is paddy, cultivated mainly in the valley bottoms and terraced slopes. In the upland areas (dongar land), farmers cultivate ragi (finger millet), maize, and arhar (pigeon pea).
- Horticulture: Due to the conducive hill climate, the block has seen a shift towards horticultural plantations. Major plantation crops include cashew nut, mango, and pineapple, which are promoted under the National Horticulture Mission to provide sustainable income alternatives to traditional shifting cultivation.

=== Forest produce ===
With a substantial tribal population, the economy is heavily supplemented by the collection of Minor Forest Produce (MFP). Key gathered items include kendu leaves, mahua flowers, tamarind, and hill broom grass, which are sold through local tribal development cooperative societies.

=== Livelihood programs ===
The Nuagada Panchayat Samiti oversees the implementation of poverty alleviation schemes, including the MGNREGS, to generate wage employment during the non-agricultural lean season.

== Health facilities ==
The block has a total of 17 Government Primary Health Centres (PHCs) and 3 Government Hospitals, providing healthcare services to the local population.

== Administrative setup ==
Nuagada Community Development (CD) block contains multiple Gram Panchayats (G.Ps), which are further subdivided into individual villages for local governance. The headquarters of each Gram Panchayat is highlighted below in bold text.

Sl. No.	Gram Panchayat (G.P.)	Village
1	Anuguru	**Anuguru**
2	Anuguru	Katama
3	Anuguru	Latingi
4	Anuguru	Naudipadara
5	Anuguru	Partipanga
6	Anuguru	Pateiguda
7	Anuguru	Poipadara
8	Anuguru	Tandarang
9	Anuguru	Tataranga
10	Anuguru	Tilikara
11	Anuguru	Uama
12	Atarasing	**Atarasing**
13	Atarasing	Kankarada
14	Atarasing	Kere
15	Atarasing	Liaba
16	Atarasing	Ragidiguma
17	Atarasing	Ringisingi
18	Atarasing	Sabalada
19	Badapada	**Badapada**
20	Betarasingi	Andarsing
21	Betarasingi	**Betarasingi**
22	Betarasingi	K. Subalada
23	Betarasingi	Kankada
24	Betarasingi	Khilanga
25	Betarasingi	Mahulapada
26	Betarasingi	Marlaba
27	K. Jhalarsing	Budupada
28	K. Jhalarsing	Gurudaba
29	K. Jhalarsing	Jhagadi
30	K. Jhalarsing	**K. Jhalarsing**
31	K. Jhalarsing	Rumbaul
32	Keradanga	Bailapadara
33	Keradanga	Kamalapur
34	Keradanga	**Keredanga**
35	Keradanga	Lakijhol
36	Keradanga	Palapur
37	Keradanga	Rangamunda
38	Keradanga	Satar
39	Keradanga	Tabaraput
40	Keradanga	Termenda
41	Khajuripada	Anusahi
42	Khajuripada	Bailapadar
43	Khajuripada	Chhanapada
44	Khajuripada	Dogharia
45	Khajuripada	Jungle Block No-5
46	Khajuripada	Jungle Block-7
47	Khajuripada	Jungle Block-8
48	Khajuripada	Jungle Block No-19
49	Khajuripada	K. Manikpur
50	Khajuripada	**Khajuripada**
51	Khajuripada	Kindar
52	Khajuripada	Murising
53	Khajuripada	Rajamba
54	Khajuripada	Sargisahi
55	Khajuripada	Sinjaba
56	Khajuripada	Tajar
57	Khajuripada	Tarangada
58	Khajuripada	Tedugu
59	Kirama	Bimanapur
60	Kirama	Dalimbapur
61	Kirama	Jamaguda
62	Kirama	Jarigidua
63	Kirama	**Kirama**
64	Kirama	Nidhigudi
65	Kirama	Patangapadar
66	Kirama	Pedikapadar
67	Luhangar	Bagari
68	Luhangar	Jungle Block No-11
69	Luhangar	Jungle Block No-6
70	Luhangar	Ketunga
71	Luhangar	Khamarnuasahi
72	Luhangar	Kijang
73	Luhangar	Kudinda
74	Luhangar	Kumjang
75	Luhangar	**Luhangar**
76	Luhangar	Luhasing
77	Luhangar	Muri
78	Luhangar	Pelar
79	Luhangar	Rebidi
80	Luhangar	Sauraantarda
81	Luhangar	Sauri
82	Luhangar	Takabul
83	Luhangar	Taramagada
84	Luhangar	Tunderi
85	Luhangar	Ukarasing
86	Nuagada	Bhramarpur
87	Nuagada	K.Rogaising
88	Nuagada	**Nuagada**
89	P. Antarada	Alising
90	P. Antarada	Gobindapur
91	P. Antarada	Guara
92	P. Antarada	Jangjang
93	P. Antarada	Kanada
94	P. Antarada	Luhasing
95	P. Antarada	Manikpur
96	P. Antarada	**Paika Antarada**
97	P. Antarada	Paleri
98	P. Antarada	Paradhol
99	P. Antarada	Rubudising
100	P. Antarada	Saladasingi
101	Parimala	Chadiapada
102	Parimala	Lathar
103	Parimala	N.Baradanga
104	Parimala	Panasapadar
105	Parimala	**Parimala**
106	Parimala	Saralapadar
107	Putrupada	Aradi
108	Putrupada	Baraba
109	Putrupada	Burusingi
110	Putrupada	Jhuntiasahi
111	Putrupada	Luhaba
112	Putrupada	Marama
113	Putrupada	Nuasahi
114	Putrupada	Ora
115	Putrupada	Paraji
116	Putrupada	**Putrupada**
117	Putrupada	Salankoi
118	Putrupada	Taraba
119	Putrupada	Tuburusingi
120	Putrupada	Tuman
121	Sambalpur	Buruduguda
122	Sambalpur	Gotha
123	Sambalpur	Guruda
124	Sambalpur	Jungle Block No- 41
125	Sambalpur	Libiriguda
126	Sambalpur	Litiguda
127	Sambalpur	N. Jhalarsing
128	Sambalpur	Puspanga
129	Sambalpur	Rogaisingi
130	Sambalpur	**Sambalapur**
131	Sambalpur	Sikabadi
132	Sundardanga	Atilima
133	Sundardanga	Buripadar
134	Sundardanga	Burukapeta
135	Sundardanga	Ramagiri
136	Sundardanga	**Sundardanga**
137	Tabarada	Goli
138	Tabarada	janapada
139	Tabarada	Jungle Block No-15
140	Tabarada	Jungle Block No-14
141	Tabarada	Jungle Block No-9
142	Tabarada	K. Baradanga
143	Tabarada	Ketungpada
144	Tabarada	Kindosing
145	Tabarada	Kitungul
146	Tabarada	Lenge
147	Tabarada	**Tabarada**
148	Tabarada	Tarabanga
149	Tangili	Baghasingisahi
150	Tangili	Bahadapada
151	Tangili	Kurma
152	Tangili	Laflang
153	Tangili	Majhisahi
154	Tangili	Podaguma
155	Tangili	**Tangili**
156	Titising	Adangar
157	Titising	Bariola
158	Titising	Baroi
159	Titising	Guduru
160	Titising	Gurungi
161	Titising	Jangla
162	Titising	Jholasahi
163	Titising	Kanimunda
164	Titising	Karanjasing
165	Titising	Kimbunul
166	Titising	Kinchartal
167	Titising	Kindoda
168	Titising	Koroda
169	Titising	Rajabul
170	Titising	Rumudul
171	Titising	Sandhisahi
172	Titising	Surangi
173	Titising	**Titising**
174	Udayapur	Dhepiriguda
175	Udayapur	Kakatabandha
176	Udayapur	Kodeda
177	Udayapur	Kujapanga
178	Udayapur	Mandidi
179	Udayapur	Nagidi
180	Udayapur	Udayaguda
181	Udayapur	**Udayapur**
