= Gumma, Gajapati =

CD Block in the Gajapati district of Indian State of Odisha

Gumma
- Community development block
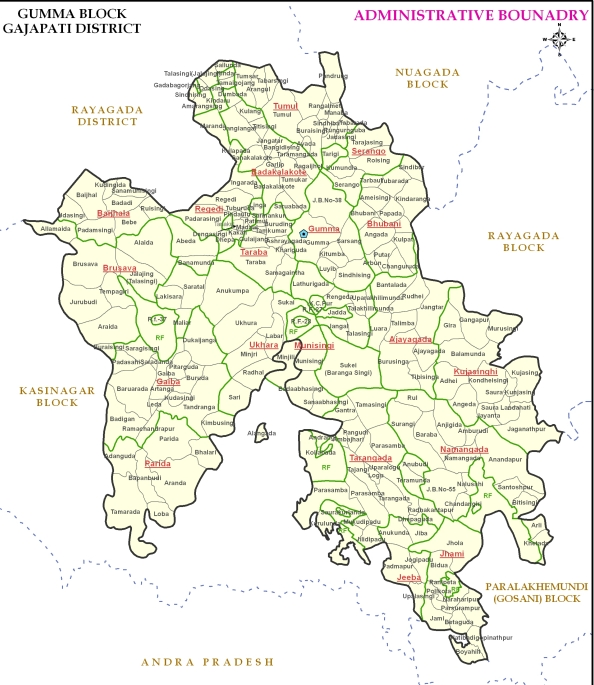

- Location in Odisha, India Gumma (India)
- Coordinates: 18.9839°N 84.0200°E
- Country: India
- State: Odisha
- District: Gajapati
- Established: 6th August 2008
- Founder: Government of Odisha

Government
  - Type: Local Government (Tier 3)
  - Body: Gummā Panchayat Samiti
  - MLA: Shri Rupesh Kumar Panigrahi BJD

Area
  - Total: 441.92 km^{2} (170.63 sq mi)
  - Rank: 5th in Gajapati District

Population (2020)
  - Total: 72,808
  - Density: 165/km^{2} (430/sq mi)

Languages
  - Official: Odia
- Time zone: UTC+5:30 (IST)
- PIN: 761201; 761207
- Telephone code: 06815
- Website: odisha.gov.in

Gumma is a village and Community Development Block in the Gajapati District of Odisha state in India. The Block had a population of 72,808 in 2020 census. Paralakhemundi (Odisha Vidhan Sabha constituency) (Sl. No.: 137) is its Vidhan Sabha constituency.This constituency includes Gumma block, Kashinagar block, Paralakhemundi block.
