= 2014 Chennai building collapse =

Incident of building collapse

Coordinates: 13°1′16.96″N 80°8′37.67″E

On 28 June 2014, an eleven-storey apartment block collapsed while under construction at Moulivakkam in the suburb of Chennai, Tamil Nadu, India.

The cause was determined to be a lightning strike to exposed metal at the top, which was conducted through the building and to ground via reinforcement bars embedded in the concrete, which led to failure of support columns and subsequent collapse of the structure.

The collapse killed 61 people, mostly construction workers who were trapped in the debris.

== Builder and building details ==
Prime Trust Heights was a residential project developed by Prime Sristi Housing Pvt Ltd.

Trust heights consisted of two eleven-storied apartment blocks situated at No.52 Kundrathur Main Road near Porur junction.

Tower The Faith had four apartments of 2BHK-type (2-Bedroom with Hall and Kitchen) in each floor. Tower The Belief had four 3BHK apartments in each floor . Units were priced at 5250 per sq/ft.

== Collapse ==
After heavy rain on Saturday, June 28, lightning struck exposed iron reinforcements at the top of the building at 5.30 p.m. The electric charge flowed throughout the entire superstructure until it reached the concrete, load-bearing columns in the basement. The concrete crumbled as the charge dispersed, destroying the columns, which resulted in collapse, trapping many constructions workers under the debris.

== Rescue operations ==
Tamil Nadu Fire and Rescue force along with National Disaster Response Force (NDRF) from Arakkonam base managed the rescue operations. The final death toll was 61 people consisting of construction workers from Madurai, Tamil Nadu, Srikakulam district of Andhra Pradesh and Gajapati district of Odisha.

== Investigation ==
A single Judge investigation committee and a SIT team were formed by Tamil Nadu government to investigate the cause of the disaster. The major reason for this disaster was due to the carelessness of the builders in Chennai. The chief engineer handling the construction accepted his mistake and was fined by the police.

== Aftermath ==
Chennai Metropolitan Development Authority (CMDA) currently scrutinizing construction violations of all new multi-story buildings in and around Chennai. Justice R. Regupathy Commission that inquired into the circumstances led to the collapse of the multi-storeyed building at Moulivakkam in which 55 persons were killed and many injured, has made series of recommendations including a comprehensive legislation for making insurance package compulsory for builders. The incident took place on June 28, 2014.

The report of the commission that was tabled in Assembly on Tuesday suggested comprehensive legislation or vitalisation of the existing legislation so that essential features like insurance package creating triangular responsibilities among bank, builder and customer could be made.

Introducing penal provisions, insisting upon the construction firms taking up mega projects to deposit a sizable sum in fixed deposit for 10 years are the other measures recommended by the commission.

Justice Regupathy also recommended reconstitution of the CMDA at the foundation level by forming a committee consisting of a technical officer of the agency, a law officer, experts in soil investigation, foundation design, structural engineering to compulsorily monitor all mega projects. "Apart from ensuring quality and compliance issues, the main task of the committee should be to inspect the site at all crucial stages, particularly during earth working for foundation, foundation concerting, laying the roof of basement floor and laying of the roof at each floor," Justice Regupathy stressed.

The commission has made a strong case for constituting a special squad to check primarily all mega projects taking place in and around the City limits so that recurrence of any bad incidents could be immediately stopped.

The commission has also recommended constitution of a committee so that the loss caused to the individuals who booked the flats and the injury and damage incurred by neighbouring residents. "Their buildings may be assessed and necessary recommendations may be made by such committee and compensation can be disbursed," the Judge said.

== Sources ==
- "Manoharan vs The State on 24 April, 2015". Indian Kanoon.
