= Batisiripur =

Coordinates: 18.8670°N 84.1684°E

Batisiripur, or Battisiripur, is a village in Gajapati district in Odisha, India.
