= Gandahati Waterfall =

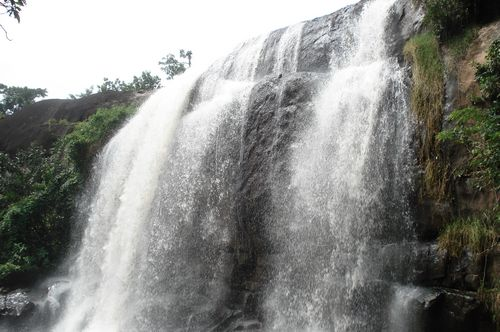

- Location within Odisha
- Location: Gajapati district, Odisha, India
- Coordinates: 18.889276°N 84.270147°E
- Elevation: 180.5 m (592 ft)
- Total height: 20 m (66 ft)
- Number of drops: 1
- Watercourse: Mahendratanaya

The Gandahati waterfall is located on the Mahendratanaya River in the Gajapati District in Southern Odisha, India. It is a popular scenic attraction located about 30 km from Paralakhemundi.

Gandahati waterfall is a tourist destination in the Gajapati District of Odisha and attracts a large number of visitors during winter. This waterfall is 153 km from Berhampur and 30km from Paralakhemundi. It can be reached by road or train, with the nearest railway stations being Palasa and Paralakhemundi. The route to the falls is covered with dense forest and crosses small villages. Nearby to Paralakhemundi is Centurion University of Technology and Management.

== Infrastructure ==
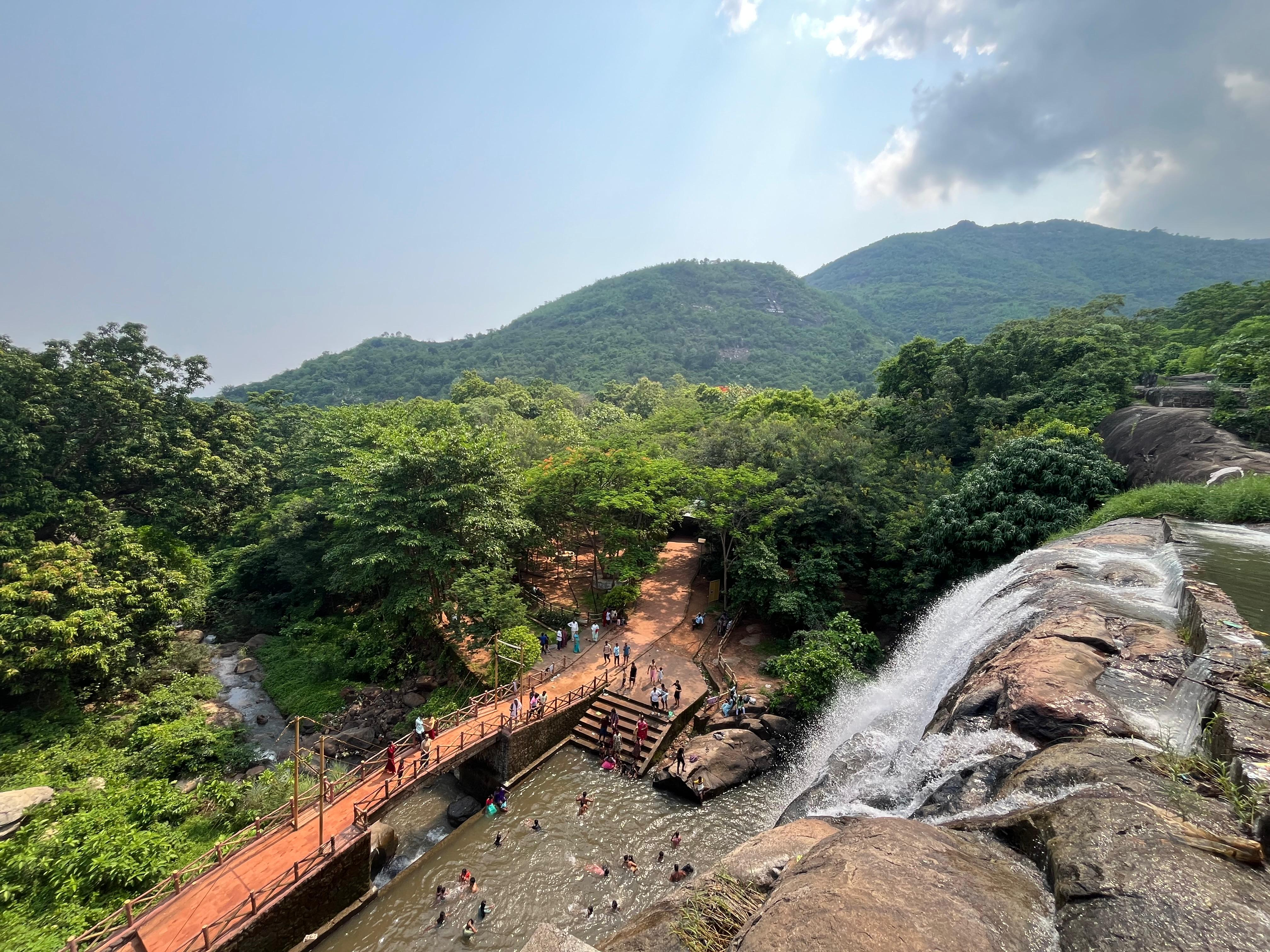
Gandahati waterfall

A temple to the Hindu Goddess Santoshi Maa's temple is located near the waterfall.

The river can be crossed via an adjacent wooden bridge. Additionally, there is a wooden fence that runs from the entrance to the waterfall area to the steps that lead to the waterfall. A small garden and playground are maintained for the amusement of the visitors.

Beneath the falls, the river is shallow, and visitors can wade into the water. Huge rocks offer another viewpoint where visitors can enjoy the fall and take photographs.

== Wildlife ==
Traces of the Asian small-clawed otter have been found in 2013.
