= Kharasanda =

- Village
- Location in Odisha, India Kharasanda (India)
- Coordinates: 18.813178°N 84.180018°E
- Country: India
- State: Odisha
- District: Gajapati

Government
  - Type: Democratic

Population (2011)
  - Total: 1,804

Languages
  - Official: Oriya
- Time zone: UTC+5:30 (IST)
- PIN: 761211
- Telephone code: 06817
- Vehicle registration: OD
- Website: odisha.gov.in

Kharasanda is a medium type village located in the Indian state of Odisha in the Gajapati district.

== Demography ==
Kharasanda is located 23 km from District headquarters Paralakhemundi, 11 km from Badagosani and 278 km from State capital Bhubaneswar. The village has 499 families with population of 1804 of which 859 are males while 945 are females as per Population Census 2011. Child Sex Ratio for the village as per the census is 1082, higher than Orissa average of 941. There is no direct rail or air communication to Kharasandha. Paralakhemundi Railway Station is the nearest railway station to Kharasandha, but Visakhapatnam Railway Station is the nearest major railway station located 172 km from Kharasandha.

== Educational institutions ==
- Rajiv Memorial High School
- Govt. U.P.School
