= Badagam =

- Location in Odisha, India Badagam (India)
- Coordinates: 18.8°N 84.2°E
- Country: India
- State: Odisha
- District: Gajapati
- Blocks: Rayagada

Population (2013)
  - Total: 2,000

Languages
  - Official: Odia
- Time zone: UTC+5:30 (IST)
- PIN: 761212
- Telephone code: 06815
- Vehicle registration: OD
- Lok Sabha constituency: Berhampur
- Vidhan Sabha constituency: Rayagada
- Literacy: 95%
- Website: odisha.gov.in

Badagam is a small village in the Rayagada Block and Parlakhemundi municipality in Gajapati district in the Indian state of Odisha. The major languages spoken in this place are Kui and Odia.

== Demographics ==
As of 2001 India census, Badagam had a population of 720. Males constitute 49% of the population and females 51%. Badagam had a literacy rate of 95%, higher than the Gajapati district's average of 61%. The majority of residents were Hindu and Christians were the second-largest religious community.

Badagam is located in Parlakhemundi tahsil, Gajapati district, Odisha.

Male Population-->640, Female Population-->660, Total Population-->1300

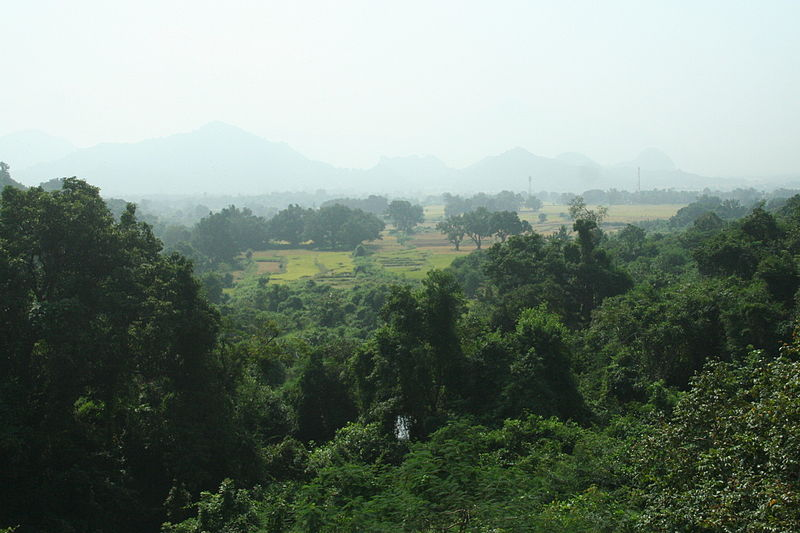
Hills surrounding Badagam

== History ==
The Binnala, Gedela, Kappala, Routhu and Sivala are the known and ancient families staying here for the last 100 years since the Madras Presidency days.

After the formation of Odisha, Badagam was previously a sub-divison of Ganjam district. Since 2 October 1992, it has been part of the Gajapati district.

== Geography and climate ==
Landscape Badagam lies in the south-east of the east Indian state of Odisha. It is close to the banks of Mahendratanaya River and few miles away from the Bay of Bengal. The climate is subtropical with high humidity. The temperature varies between 18 and 48 degrees Celsius. Summer is extremely hot with some thunderstorms and minor cyclones. Badagam receives rainfall from the southwest monsoons, and the wettest months are July, August and September.

== Education ==
Schools in Badagam include Badagam Govt School, Govt Boys' High School, and NM High School. SKCG College and Centurion University are located nearby and provide undergraduate and postgraduate education.

Literacy rate has rapidly grown up in the last decade. People started focusing towards technical education, and there are many employees across India and the globe (Singapore, US, Dubai) who represent Badagam. Most of the employees of Badagam are teachers and Army personnel representing India.

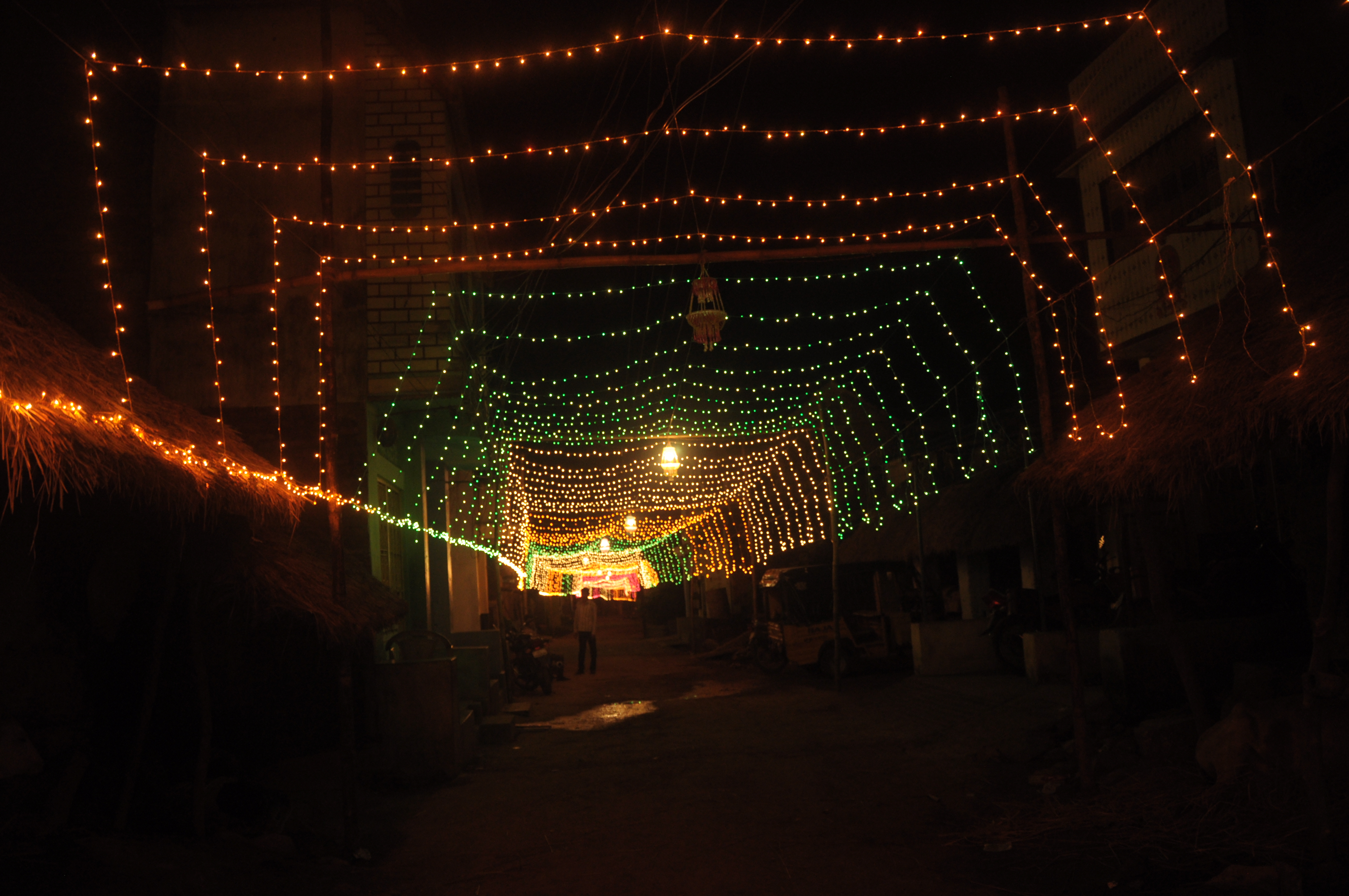
Decoration of a marriage ceremony in Badagam

== Civic administration ==
This village comes under the Narayanapur Panchayat and Rayagada Block (Assembly constituency). It comes under the Gajapati district where Parlakhemundi is the headquarters. Badagam is part of Brahmapur (Lok Sabha constituency).

== Economy ==
Agriculture is the main source of income. The village has around six rice mills and six cashew factories, which employ residents of the village and other neighboring villages in the Rayagada Block and Gajapati district. The average income of this village is 8,000 per month, higher the average income of the district and state. The economy has transformed from towards business; the proportion of farmers and landlords has reduced. Labour from this area is migrating to Hyderabad.

== Transport ==
Badagam is connected to other parts of Odisha by the State Highway No. 17 which connects Berhampur at one end and Rayagada on the other. The nearest major town Parlakhemundi is just fifteen kilometers. Palasa is just forty kilometers away and Berhampur is 120 km away. The nearest National Highway (N.H–5) junction is at around forty kilometers from Badagam. The nearest operational railway station is Parlakhemundi which is 15 km away. The narrow gauge railway line (called Naupada-Gunupur Rail line) running through this town has been converted to broad gauge, and starting 20 December 2010 a regular train started from Paralakhemundi to Puri.

The nearest Airport is the Alluri Sitarama Raju International Airport, which is at a distance of 180 km.

The O.S.R.T.C. (Odisha State Road Transport Corporation) and private buses connect the town to other parts of Odisha and nearby towns of Andhra Pradesh. The town is well connected to Bhubaneswar, Bramhapur, Rayagada, Jeypore, Gunupur, Visakhapatnam, Srikakulam, Palasa, Bhawanipatna, Nabrangpur, Cuttack, Rourkela, etc. by road.
