= Mohana Assembly constituency =

Constituency of the Odisha legislative assembly in India

Coordinates: 19.44°N 84.26°E

Mohana
- Constituency No. 136 for the Odisha Legislative Assembly
- Mohana assembly constituency in Gajapati district

Constituency details
- Country: India
- Region: East India
- State: Odisha
- Division: Southern Division
- District: Gajapati
- Lok Sabha constituency: Berhampur
- Established: 1951
- Total electors: 2,46,023 (Note: as on 2024) (Note: as data published by election commission)
- Reservation: ST

Member of Legislative Assembly
- 17th Odisha Legislative Assembly
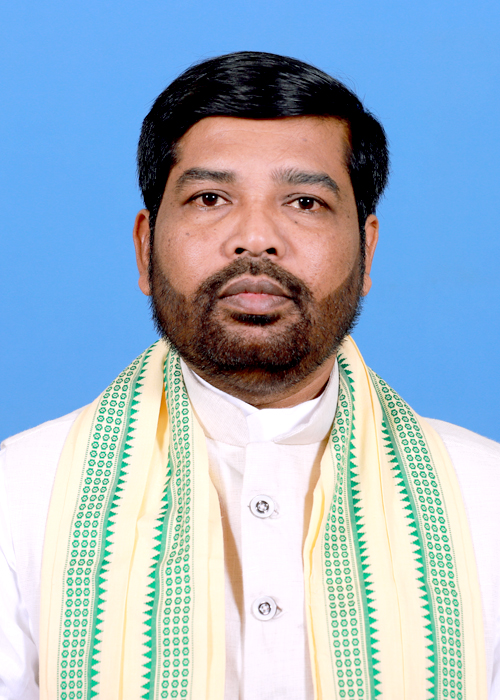
- Incumbent Dasarathi Gomango
- Party: Indian National Congress
- Elected year: 2024

Mohana is a Vidhan Sabha constituency of Gajapati district, Odisha, India. Following 2008 delimitation, Ramagiri Assembly constituency was subsumed into this constituency.

Map of Mohana Constituency

This constituency includes Nuagada Block, Mohana Block, R.Udayagiri Block.

== Elected members ==
Vote share of winning candidates
2024	34.64%
2019	33%
2014	29.88%
2009	33.63%
2004	47.60%
2000	58.62%
1995	43.08%
1990	62.12%
1985	64.48%
1980	40.59%
1977	41.21%

Since its formation in 1961, 15 elections were held till date.

List of members elected from Mohana constituency are:

Year	Member	Party
2024	Dasarathi Gomango	Indian National Congress
2019	Dasarathi Gomango	Indian National Congress
2014	Basanti Mallick	Biju Janata Dal
2009	Chakradhar Paik	Indian National Congress
2004	Surjya Narayan Patro	Biju Janata Dal
2000	Surjya Narayan Patro	Biju Janata Dal
1995	Surjya Narayan Patro	Janata Dal
1990	Surjya Narayan Patro	Janata Dal
1985	Sarat Kumar Jena	Indian National Congress
1980	Uday Narayan Dev	Janata Party (Secular)
1977	Uday Narayan Dev	Lok Dal
1974	Uday Narayan Dev	Utkal Congress
1971	Bhimasena Mandolo	Indian National Congress (R)
1967	Tareni Sardar	Indian National Congress
1961	Biswanath Nayak	Indian National Congress

== Election results ==
=== 2024 ===
Voting were held on 13th May 2024 in 1st phase of Odisha Assembly Election & 4th phase of Indian General Election. Counting of votes was on 4th June 2024. In 2024 election, Indian National Congress candidate Dasarathi Gamango defeated Bharatiya Janata Party candidate Prasanta Kumar Mallick by a margin of 4,059 votes.

2024 Odisha Vidhan Sabha Election: Mohana
Party	Candidate	Votes	%	±%
INC	Dasarathi Gomango	62,117	34.64	▲1.64
BJP	Prasanta Kumar Mallick	58,058	32.38	▲4.38
BJD	Antarjyami Gamanga	47,386	26.43	▼4.57
NOTA	None of the above	4,317	2.41	▲0.64
Majority		4,059	2.26	▲0.83
Turnout		1,79,307	71.2	▼4.46
INC hold				

=== 2019 ===
In 2019 election, Indian National Congress candidate Dasarathi Gomango defeated Biju Janata Dal candidate Purnabasi Nayak by a margin of 2,354 votes.

2019 Odisha Vidhan Sabha Election: Mohana
Party	Candidate	Votes	%	±%
INC	Dasarathi Gomango	53,705	32.75	
BJD	Purnabasi Nayak	51,351	31.32	
BJP	Prasanta Kumar Mallik	46,176	28.16	
NOTA	None of the above	2,898	1.77	
Majority		2,354	1.43	
Turnout		1,63,971	75.66	
INC gain from BJD				

=== 2014 ===
In 2014 election, Biju Janata Dal candidate Basanti Mallick defeated Indian National Congress candidate Dasarathi Gomango by a margin of 115 votes.

2014 Odisha Vidhan Sabha Election: Mohana
Party	Candidate	Votes	%	±%
BJD	Basanti Mallick	43,006	29.88	▲11.85
INC	Dasarathi Gomango	42,891	29.8	▲3.83
BJP	Bharat Paik	39,625	27.53	▲5.29
NOTA	None of the above	3,604	2.5	−
Majority		115	0.08	▼0.74
Turnout		1,43,943	74.73	▲8.47
Registered electors		1,92,613		
BJD gain from INC				

=== 2009 ===
In 2009 election, Indian National Congress candidate Chakradhar Paik defeated Bharatiya Janata Party candidate Antarjami Gamanga by a margin of 35,484 votes.

2009 Odisha Vidhan Sabha Election: Mohana
Party	Candidate	Votes	%	±%
INC	Chakradhar Paik	37,697	33.63	−
BJP	Antarjami Gamanga	36,780	32.82	−
BJD	Johan Dalabehera	20,206	18.03	−
Majority		917	0.82 (Note: % of total valid votes)	−
Turnout		1,12,087	66.26 (Note: 2004 Voter turnout was 64.81%)	▲1.45
INC gain from BJD				
