= Adava =

- Village
- Location in Odisha, India Adava (India)
- Coordinates: 19.495771°N 84.178040°E
- Country: India
- State: Odisha
- District: Gajapati

Languages
  - Official: Odia
- Time zone: UTC+5:30 (IST)
- Postal code: 761217
- Vehicle registration: OD
- Website: www.adava.gajapati.com

Adava is a small village in Gajapati District, Odisha, India. The total village population of 3,470 includes 1,782 males and 1,688 females.
