= Paralakhemundi Assembly constituency =

Constituency of the Odisha legislative assembly in India

Coordinates: 18.78°N 84.09°E

Paralakhemundi
- Constituency No. 137 for the Odisha Legislative Assembly
- Paralakhemundi assembly constituency in Gajapati district

Constituency details
- Country: India
- Region: East India
- State: Odisha
- Division: Southern Division
- District: Gajapati
- Lok Sabha constituency: Berhampur
- Established: 1951
- Total electors: 2,17,857 (Note: as on 2024) (Note: as data published by election commission)
- Reservation: None

Member of Legislative Assembly
- 17th Odisha Legislative Assembly
- Incumbent Rupesh Kumar Panigrahi
- Party: Biju Janata Dal
- Elected year: 2024

Paralakhemundi is a Vidhan Sabha constituency of Gajapati district, Odisha.

Map of Paralakhemundi Constituency

This constituency includes Paralakhemundi Municipality, Kashinagara NAC, Goshani block, Gumma block and Kashinagara block.

== Elected members ==
Vote share of winning candidates
2024	37.58%
2019	35.92%
2014	45.2%
2009	49.53%
2004	43.52%
2000	71.80%
1995	28.22%
1990	63.21%
1985	47.65%
1980	33.00%
1977	33.37%

Since its formation in 1951, 16 elections were held till date. It was a 2 member constituency for 1952.

List of members elected from Paralakhemundi constituency are:

Year	Member	Party
2024	Rupesh Kumar Panigrahi	Biju Janata Dal
2019	Koduru Narayana Rao	Bharatiya Janata Party
2014	Kengam Surya Rao	Indian National Congress
2009	Koduru Narayana Rao	Biju Janata Dal
2004	Trinath Sahu	Indian National Congress
2000	Trinath Sahu	Indian National Congress
1995	Trinath Sahu	Indian National Congress
1990	Darapu Lachana Naidu	Janata Dal
1985	Trinath Sahu	Indian National Congress
1980	Bijoy Kumar Jena	Independent politician
1977	Bijoy Kumar Jena	Independent politician
1974	Kurma Naikulu N.	Utkal Congress
1971	Darapu Lachana Naidu	Swatantra Party
1967	Kurma Naikulu N.	Indian National Congress
1961	Kurma Naikulu N.	Indian National Congress
1956-1960 : Constituency did not exist
1951 (Note: It was a 2 member constituency)	Appena Dora Biswasrai	Independent politician
1951	Jagannath Mishra	Communist Party of India

== Election results ==
=== 2024 ===
Voting were held on 13th May 2024 in 1st phase of Odisha Assembly Election & 4th phase of Indian General Election. Counting of votes was on 4th June 2024. In 2024 election, Biju Janata Dal candidate Rupesh Kumar Panigrahi defeated Bharatiya Janata Party candidate Koduru Narayana Rao by a margin of 3,998 votes.

2024 Odisha Vidhan Sabha Election: Paralakhemundi
Party	Candidate	Votes	%	±%
BJD	Rupesh Kumar Panigrahi	56,027	37.58	▲19.32
BJP	Koduru Narayana Rao	52,029	34.90	▼1.02
INC	Bijay Kumar Patnaik	35,674	23.93	▲7.46
NOTA	None of the above	1,488	1.00	▼0.33
Majority		3,998	2.68	▼7.83
Turnout		1,49,069	67.91	▼1.36
BJD gain from BJP				

=== 2019 ===
In 2019 election, Bharatiya Janata Party candidate Konduru Narayan Rao defeated Independent candidate Trirupati Panigrahy by a margin of 15,335 votes.

2019 Odisha Vidhan Sabha Election: Paralakhemundi
Party	Candidate	Votes	%	±%
BJP	Konduru Narayan Rao	52,415	35.92	
Independent	Trirupati Panigrahy	37,080	25.41	
BJD	Kalyani Gajapati	26,645	18.26	
INC	Kengam Surya Rao	24,040	16.47	
NOTA	None of the above	1,944	1.33	
Majority		15,335	10.51	
Turnout		1,45,927	69.27	
BJP gain from INC				

=== 2014 ===
In 2014 election, Indian National Congress candidate Kengam Surya Rao defeated Biju Janata Dal candidate Koduru Narayana Rao by a margin of 1419 votes.

2014 Odisha Vidhan Sabha Election: Paralakhemundi
Party	Candidate	Votes	%	±%
INC	Kengam Surya Rao	61,014	45.1	▲6.5
BJD	Koduru Narayana Rao	59,595	44.1	▼7.0
BJP	Tripati Nayak	6,938	5.1	▼0.74
NOTA	None of the above	1548	1.15	−
Majority		1,419	1.05	▼12
Turnout		1,35,001	70.03	▲6.31
Registered electors		1,92,782		
INC gain from BJD				

=== 2009 ===
In 2009 election, Biju Janata Dal candidate Koduru Narayana Rao defeated Indian National Congress candidate Trinath Sahu by a margin of 14,941 votes.

2009 Odisha Vidhan Sabha Election: Paralakhemundi
Party	Candidate	Votes	%	±%
BJD	Koduru Narayana Rao	58,528	51.10	−
INC	Trinath Sahu	43,587	38.06	−
BJP	T. Kuranna	6,686	5.84	−
Majority		14,941	13.05 (Note: % of total valid votes)	−
Turnout		1,14,556	63.72 (Note: 2004 Voter turnout was 60.29%)	▲3.43
BJD gain from INC				
