= Dasarathi Gomango =

Indian politician from Odisha

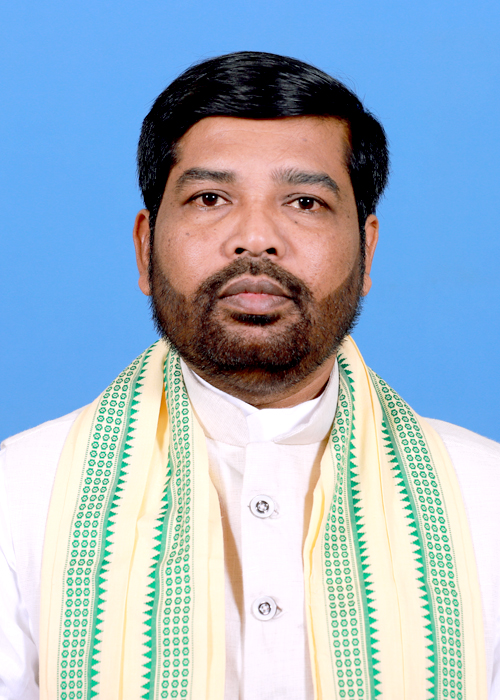

Member of the Odisha Legislative Assembly
- Incumbent
- Assumed office 23 May 2019
- Preceded by: Basanti Mallick
- Constituency: Mohana

Personal details
- Born: 2 March 1971 (age 55) Mahendragada, Gajapati district, Odisha, India
- Party: Independent (March 2026–present)
- Other political affiliations: Indian National Congress (till 2026)
- Parent: Late Kartika Gomanga (father)
- Occupation: Cultivation, business, social work

Dasarathi Gomango (also spelled Gamango; born 2 March 1971) is an Indian politician from Odisha who serves as a member of the Odisha Legislative Assembly representing the Mohana. He was originally elected as a member of the Indian National Congress in 2019 and re-elected in 2024. In March 2026, he was suspended from the party for anti-party activities and cross-voting during the Rajya Sabha elections, subsequently serving as an independent legislator.

== Political career ==
Gomango entered active politics through the Indian National Congress. He contested the 2019 Odisha Legislative Assembly election from the Mohana constituency and won, defeating his closest opponent from the Biju Janata Dal (BJD). He successfully retained his seat during the 2024 Odisha Assembly elections.

In March 2026, the Odisha Pradesh Congress Committee (OPCC) issued a show-cause notice to Gomango after he reportedly went incommunicado ahead of the crucial Rajya Sabha elections. On 17 March 2026, the Congress disciplinary committee suspended Gomango along with two other party legislators for defying the official party whip by cross-voting in favor of a Bharatiya Janata Party-backed independent candidate. Following his suspension, he continued to hold his assembly seat as an independent politician.
