= Mohana =

Census town and CD block in Gajapati district, Odisha, India

Mohana ମୋହନା
- Census Town and CD Block HQ
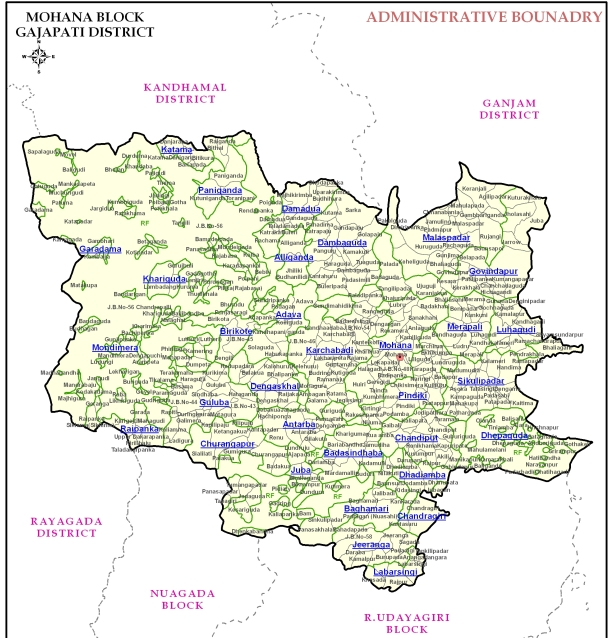
- Map of Mohana Block in Gajapati district Map of Mohana Block

- Location in Odisha, India Mohana (India)
- Coordinates: 19°25′N 84°13′E
- Country: India
- State: Odisha
- District: Gajapati
- Block Established: 15 August 1996 (30 years ago)
- Founder: Government of Odisha
- Named for: Derived from the Odia word Muhāna (lit. 'mouth of a river')

Government
  - Type: Panchayat Samiti
  - Body: Mohana Panchayat Samiti
  - MLA: Dasarathi Gomango (INC)

Area
  - Total: 2.51 km^{2} (0.97 sq mi)
  - CD Block Area: 1,636.51 km^{2} (631.86 sq mi)

Population (2026 projection)
  - Total: 7,700 (Note: Projected expansion strictly within the statutory 2.51 km² census town limits from the baseline 2011 census total of 5,197 across 1,121 households.)
  - Density: 3,100/km^{2} (7,900/sq mi)
  - CD Block Pop.: 182,679

Languages
  - Official: Odia

Demographics (Town)
  - Sex ratio: 934 ♀/1000 ♂
  - Child sex ratio: 811 ♀/1000 ♂
  - Literacy rate: 88.55%
  - Male literacy: 94.97%
  - Female literacy: 81.81%
- Time zone: UTC+5:30 (IST)
- PIN: 761015
- Telephone code: 06816
- Vehicle registration: OD-20
- Police jurisdiction: Mohana Police Station
- Assembly segment: Mohana Assembly constituency (Sl. No. 136)

Mohana is a hill valley census town and community development block (CD block) headquarters located in the Gajapati district of the Indian state of Odisha. Serving as the headquarters of the geographically largest block by territorial area in Gajapati district, Mohana operates under the local governance of the Mohana Panchayat Samiti and falls under the administrative jurisdiction of the Mohana Police Station.

Structurally situated within the mountain-clad ranges of the Eastern Ghats, the town serves as a transit and logistic checkpoint along National Highway 326 (NH-326), a major socioeconomic corridor connecting southern Odisha's tribal regions. At the town level, the urban area covers 2.51 km² and recorded a population of 5,197 during the 2011 census across 1,121 households with a baseline literacy rate of 88.55%. The entire surrounding community development block accommodates a collective population estimated at 182,679 people across a vast territorial expanse of 1,636.51 km². Politically, the town falls within the Scheduled Tribe reserved Mohana Assembly constituency (Sl. No. 136) of the Odisha Legislative Assembly.

== History ==
The geographic area comprising Mohana was originally an integrated administrative territory within the undivided Ganjam district during both the British colonial administration and post-independence eras. The region historically served as a demographic home for indigenous tribal communities, chiefly the Saora and Khond populations, whose socio-economic structures relied on localized agricultural cycles and forest ecosystems. Following administrative reorganizations executed by the Government of Odisha, the old Ganjam district was bifurcated on 2 October 1992. This partition established the separate Gajapati district, named in honor of Maharaja Sri Krushna Chandra Gajapati Narayan Deo, the first Prime Minister of the separate Orissa Province. To streamline localized governance across the expansive, mountain-clad northern boundaries of the newly configured district, the Mohana community development block was formally separated and commissioned on 15 August 1996. The namesake settlement transitioned from an isolated valley hub into a central marketplace depot following systemic logistical improvements along National Highway 326. The linguistic origin of the town's title is derived from the Odia language word Muhana, which references a river mouth or drainage terminal corresponding to local geographic features.

== Geography ==
Mohana is situated in the northeastern segment of Gajapati district, anchoring the "North Eastern Ghat Agro Climatic Zone" of Odisha. The block functions as a critical pediment of undulating plains that have undergone intense weathering, bridging the rugged high-altitude terrains of the Eastern Ghats with the lower valley floors.

=== Terrain and Geology ===
The region's topography is defined by its rugged, mountain-clad landscape, featuring narrow inter-mountain valleys and steep hill ranges with elevations oscillating between 500 and 1,200 metres above mean sea level. Geologically, the area is underlain by the consolidated hard rock formations of the Eastern Ghats Super Group, primarily composed of Khondalite, Charnockite, and Porphyritic Granite Gneiss. The surface soil profile is dominated by light-textured brown forest soils which are typically highly acidic in nature, alongside patches of red and lateritic soils on the upper gradients.

=== Hydrography ===
The hydrogeological layout of Mohana is governed by the Harbhangi River, a major tributary of the Vamsadhara River. The river system acts as the primary drainage channel for the block's rainwater but also presents significant connectivity challenges; during heavy monsoonal swelling, vital transit points—such as the bridge connections near Gardama panchayat—have historically faced structural failures, isolating riverside communities.

=== Climate ===
Mohana experiences a tropical monsoon climate characterized by high humidity and distinct seasonal microclimates due to its mountain valleys. The block receives the majority of its rainfall from the South West Monsoon, contributing to the district's average annual precipitation baseline of approximately 1,403 mm.

Climate data for Mohana (Gajapati District)
Month	Jan	Feb	Mar	Apr	May	Jun	Jul	Aug	Sep	Oct	Nov	Dec	Year
Mean daily maximum °C (°F)	28.5 (83.3)	31.2 (88.2)	34.6 (94.3)	37.1 (98.8)	38.0 (100.4)	34.2 (93.6)	30.1 (86.2)	29.8 (85.6)	30.5 (86.9)	30.0 (86.0)	28.6 (83.5)	27.4 (81.3)	31.7 (89.1)
Mean daily minimum °C (°F)	14.8 (58.6)	17.5 (63.5)	20.9 (69.6)	24.2 (75.6)	26.1 (79.0)	25.4 (77.7)	23.9 (75.0)	23.6 (74.5)	23.8 (74.8)	22.1 (71.8)	18.2 (64.8)	14.6 (58.3)	21.3 (70.3)
Average rainfall mm (inches)	10.4 (0.41)	15.1 (0.59)	18.3 (0.72)	32.5 (1.28)	68.2 (2.69)	185.4 (7.30)	310.2 (12.21)	322.1 (12.68)	245.6 (9.67)	142.3 (5.60)	41.2 (1.62)	11.7 (0.46)	1,403 (55.24)
Source: State Level Environment Impact Assessment Authority (SEIAA), Odisha

=== Flora ===
The sub-montane tracts of Mohana support moist deciduous and semi-evergreen forest covers. Key commercially and ecologically significant vegetation includes Sal (Shorea robusta), Bamboo, and Hill Broom (Thysanolaena maxima), which underpin the livelihood of the local tribal populace through the collection of minor forest produce.

== Demographics ==
According to the official 2011 Census of India, the demographic framework of the Mohana Census Town supports a total population of 5,197 residents sheltered across 1,121 family households. The demographic profile highlights an average literacy rate of 88.55%, with male literacy measured at 94.97% and female literacy measured at 81.81%.

The following charts illustrate the population distribution across key socio-economic categories as per the 2011 official dataset:

=== Gender Distribution ===
The town recorded an urban sex ratio of 934 females per 1,000 males, which sits below the national average.

Gender Composition (Mohana Town 2011)
1. Male (51.7%)
2. Female (48.3%)

=== Religious Composition ===
Mohana exhibits a diverse religious profile with a substantial Christian minority population relative to the broader state averages.

Religion (Mohana Town 2011)
1. Hindu (62.8%)
2. Christian (36.6%)
3. Muslim (0.52%)
4. Others (0.17%)

=== Caste Composition ===
Unlike the surrounding tribal-dominated rural block, the urban census town boundary has a higher concentration of General and OBC categories, though Scheduled Castes and Scheduled Tribes remain integral to the social fabric.

Caste Profile (Mohana Town 2011)
1. General / OBC (75.3%)
2. Scheduled Caste (14.8%)
3. Scheduled Tribe (9.87%)

=== Language Profile ===
While town-specific linguistic metrics are consolidated under the larger district data in the census, the Gajapati District dataset provides the surrounding language context where Odia is the primary administrative language and Saura is the dominant tribal tongue.

Language (Gajapati District Context 2011)
1. Odia (41.5%)
2. Saura (34.5%)
3. Telugu (15.5%)
4. Kui (5.54%)
5. Others (2.93%)
