= Temburu =

- village
- Interactive map of Temburu
- Location in Andhra Pradesh, India Temburu (India)
- Coordinates: 18°38′00″N 84°08′00″E
- Country: India
- State: Andhra Pradesh

Languages
  - Official: Telugu
- Time zone: UTC+5:30 (IST)
- Vehicle Registration: AP30 (former); AP39 (from 30 January 2019)

Temburu is a village located in Pathapatnam mandal in Srikakulam district.

Temburu railway station is located on Naupada-Gunupur branch line.
