= Rayagada, Gajapati =

Village and administrative subunit in India

Rayagada
- Community development block
- Location in Odisha, India Rayagada (India)
- Coordinates: 18.9720°N 84.1587°E
- Country: India
- State: Odisha
- District: Gajapati
- Established: 26 April 2008

Government
  - Type: Local Government (Tier 3)
  - Body: Rayagada Panchayat Samiti
  - MLA: Dasarathi Gamango

Area
  - Total: 707.15 km^{2} (273.03 sq mi)
  - Rank: 3rd in Gajapati district

Population (2020)
  - Total: 99,568
  - Density: 141/km^{2} (370/sq mi)

Languages
  - Official: Odia
- Time zone: UTC+5:30 (IST)
- PIN: 761213
- Telephone code: 06815

Rayagada is a village and Community Development Block HQ in the Gajapati District of Odisha state in India. The Block had a population of 99,568 in 2020 census. Mohana (Odisha Vidhan Sabha constituency) (Sl. No.: 136) is its Vidhan Sabha constituency. This constituency includes Mohana block, R.Udayagiri block, Nuagada block and Rayagada block.
