= Kashinagara =

Kashinagar
- Town
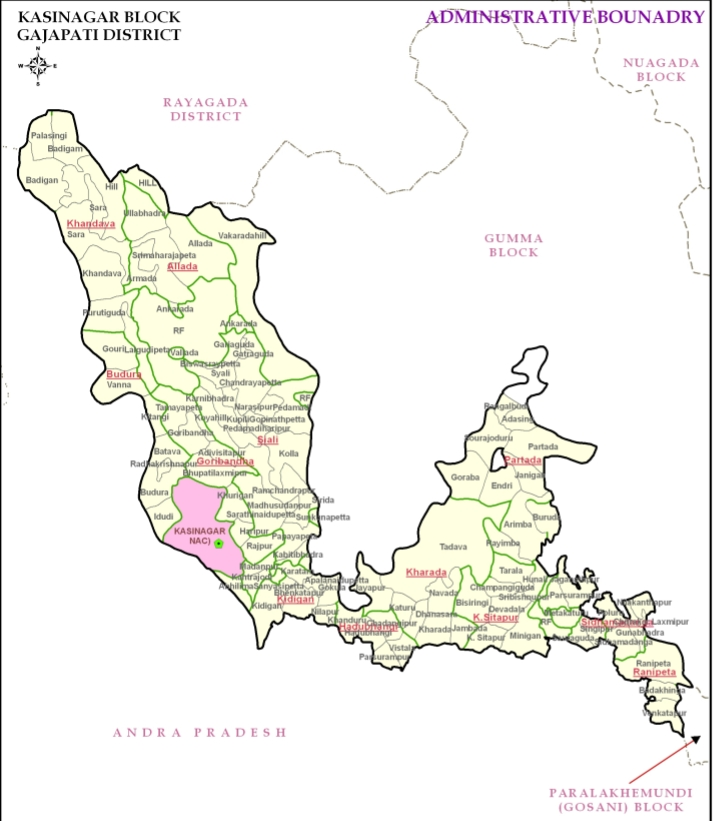

- Location in Odisha, India Kashinagar (India)
- Coordinates: 18.869°N 83.8746°E
- Country: India
- State: Odisha
- District: Gajapati
- Established: 31 October 2009

Area
  - Total: 247.73 km^{2} (95.65 sq mi)

Population (2020)
  - Total: 44,587
  - Density: 179.98/km^{2} (466.15/sq mi)

Languages
  - Official: Odia
- Time zone: UTC+5:30 (IST)
- PIN: 761206
- Vehicle registration: OD-20
- Website: odisha.gov.in

Kashinagar is a town and headquarters of a community development block of the same name in Gajapati district in the Indian state of Odisha.

== Demographics ==
As of 2001 India census, Kashinagar had a population of 9782. Males constitute 49% of the population and females 51%. Kashinagar has an average literacy rate of 43%, lower than the national average of 59.5%: male literacy is 53%, and female literacy is 34%. In Kashinagar, 13% of the population is under 6 years of age.

== Transport ==
Road

Kashinagar has frequent connectivity of buses to Srikakulam, Tekkali, Hiramandalam, Palasa, Visakhapatnam, Anakapalle, Palakonda, Rajam, Paralakhemundi, Gunupur, Berhampur, Temburu, Mukhalingam.

Rail

Kashinagar can be reached by train via the Naupada-Gunupur branch line. The railway station is Kashinagar station of East Coast Railway Zone. It is connected to Howrah-Chennai main line. It has trains to Puri, Gunupur, Palasa-Kasibugga, Visakhapatnam.

Air

The closest airport is Alluri Sitarama Raju International Airport, 185 km from Kashinagar. Bhubaneswar Airport is 305 km away.
