= Aharpada =

- Village
- Interactive map of Aharpada
- Coordinates: 21.025276°N 86.546720°E
- Country: India
- State: Orissa
- District: Bhadrak

Languages
  - Official: Oriya
- Time zone: UTC+5:30 (IST)
- Vehicle registration: OR-

Aharpada is a small village in Khandatada Panchayata, Bhadrak district, Orissa, India with a population of nearly 1,000.
