= Mahendratanaya River =

River in Andhra Pradesh, India

Coordinates: 18.765594°N 84.110704°E

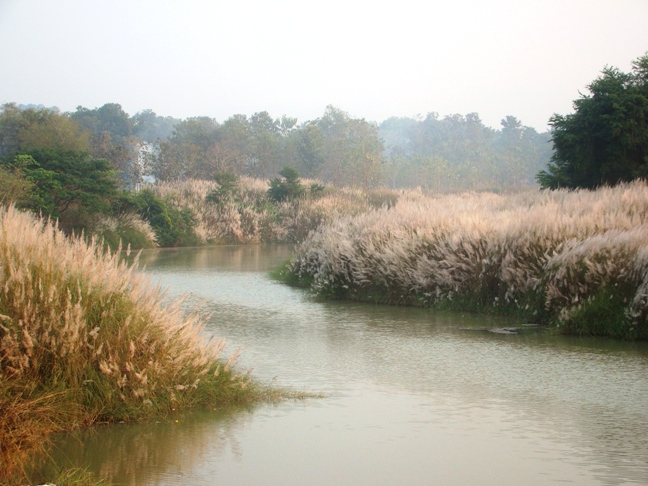
Mahendratanaya River at Pathapatnam

Mahendratanaya River is a medium-sized river in India.

The 90 kilometres (56 mi) long Mahendratanaya is a major tributary of Vamsadhara River which originates from Mahendragiri Hills.

This river merges in to Vamsadhara river upstream of Gotta barrage.
