= Rupesh Kumar Panigrahi =

Indian politician

Member of the Odisha Legislative Assembly
- Incumbent
- Assumed office 4 June 2024
- Preceded by: Konduru Narayan Rao
- Constituency: Paralakhemundi

Personal details
- Party: Biju Janata Dal(2019)
- Other political affiliations: Indian National Congress, Independent
- Profession: Politician

Rupesh Kumar Panigrahi is an Indian politician who was elected to the Odisha Legislative Assembly from 2024, representing Paralakhemundi as a member of the Biju Janata Dal.
