= Mahendragiri (Odisha) =

Mountain in Odisha, India

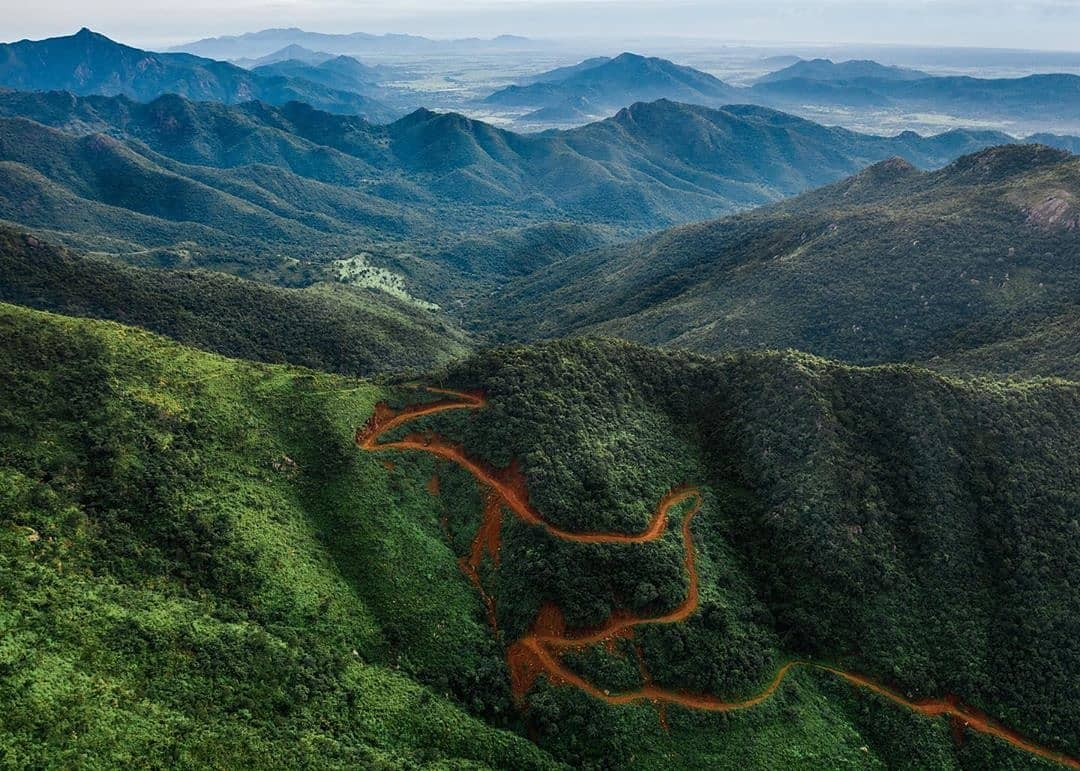

Highest point
- Elevation: 1,501 m (4,925 ft)
- Coordinates: 18°58′28″N 84°22′05″E

Geography
- Location within India Location within Odisha
- Location: Rayagada, Gajapati, Odisha, India
- Parent range: Eastern Ghats

Climbing
- Easiest route: Motorable Road

Mahendragiri, is a mountain in Rayagada block of the district of Gajapati, Odisha, India. It is situated amongst the Eastern Ghats at an elevation of 1,501 metres (4,925 ft). The second highest motorable mountain of Odisha and 8th highest peak of Odisha.

== Geography ==
This is the 8th highest mountain peak of Odisha after Niyamgiri in Rayagada and Kalahandi districts. It has interesting archaeological remains.

Mahendragiri hill and its surrounding areas are recognized as a biodiversity hot spot due to numerous medicinal plants and other species that are found here. A haven for medicinal plants, Mahendragiri Hills, which is part of the Eastern Ghats, is home to over 600 flowering plants. The faunal diversity of the region is huge and particularly known for being a herpetofauna hotspot.

The Ministry of Environment and Forests, GoI had proposed the State Government of Odisha in 1986 to declare the Mahendragiri hill as a Biodiversity Hotspot area. An expert committee of the Forest and Environment Department has also recommended that the bio-diversity hotspot Mahendragiri Hills should be declared as a Biosphere Reserve in 2014.

The Mahendragiri Biosphere Reserve Committee, which was constituted in November, 2011, held its last meeting in December last after which it submitted its final report recommending that a Biosphere Reserve in Mahendragiri Hill Complex should be created.

As per the survey carried out by Odisha Space Application Centre, the core area could be spread over 42.54 km^{2} while the buffer zone will have an area of 1577.02 km^{2}. The transitional area is estimated at 3095.76 km^{2}. The entire biosphere reserve, proposed at 4715.32 km^{2} area.

== History ==
Mahendragiri is associated with the Ramayana as Mahendra Parvata (mountain). It is a 'Kula Parvata' along with Malaya, Sahyadri, Parijatra, Shuktiman, Vindhya and Malyavaan. In the Puranas and Ramayana It is said that Parashurama was meditating on Mahendragiri when Lord Rama broke the sacred bow of Shiva.

Mahendragiri is situated in Gajapati district, Odisha. Legend says that it is the place where Lord Parashurama, a chiranjeevi stays eternally and performs tapasya. Parashurama is the sixth avatar of Vishnu in Hinduism and he is one of the Chiranjeevis (long - lived), who will appear at the end of the Kali yuga to be the guru of Vishnu's tenth and last avatar, Kalki. He carried a number of traits, which included aggression, warfare and valor; also, serenity, prudence and patience. He retired in the Mahendra Mountains, according to chapter 2.3.47 of the Bhagavata Purana. He is the only Vishnu avatar who never dies, never returns to abstract Vishnu and lives in meditative retirement. Further, he is the only Vishnu avatar that co-exists with other Vishnu avatars Rama and Krishna in some versions of the Ramayana and Mahabharata respectively. Temples, which are said to be built by the Pandavas are present. The main festival observed here is Shivaratri.

== Mythology ==
There is clear mention in various scriptures regarding the abode of Lord Parashuram, the prominence of Mount Mahendra and the meeting of Lord Parashuram there. Important scriptural evidence related to this subject is given below from the texts like Shree Mahabharatam, Shreemad Valmikiyaramayana, Shreemad Bhagavatam and Shree Shiva Mahapuranam etc.

• Regarding to the Lord Parashurama's abode—
॰ In the Shreemad Bhagavatam, it's mentioned as follows:
Āste'dyāpi Mahendrādrau nyasta-daṇḍaḥ praśānta-dhīḥ,
Upagīyamāna-caritaḥ siddha-gandharva-cāraṇaiḥ. “Lord Parashurama resides on Mahendra Mountain even to this day. He has completely renounced the weapons of the Kshatriyas and remains established as a wise Brahmana, endowed with a peaceful and steady mind. Because of His exalted character and great deeds, celestial beings such as the Siddhas, Charanas, and Gandharvas constantly praise Him and sing His glories.” – Shreemad Bhagavatam 9.16.26

॰ In the Shree Mahabharatam, it's mentioned as follows:
Sa pradāya mahīṃ tasmai Kaśyapāya mahātmane,
Asmin Mahendre Śailendre vasatyamitavikramaḥ. "Thus, having given the entire earth to the great sage Kashyapa, the immensely powerful Lord Parashurama resides on this king of mountains, Mahendra." – Shree Mahabharatam 3.117.14

Saptadvīpāṃ vasumatīṃ mārīco ’gṛhṇata dvijaḥ,
Rāmaṃ provāca nirgaccha vasudhāto mamājñayā.
Sa kaśyapasya vacanāt protsārya saritāṃ pratim,
Iṣupāte yudhāṃ śreṣṭhaḥ kurvan brāhmaṇaśāsanam.
Adhyāvasad giriśreṣṭhaṃ mahendra parvatottamam. "When sage Kashyapa accepted the Earth consisting of the seven continents as a gift, he said to Shree Parashurama. 'Now, by my command, leave this Earth and go elsewhere to reside.' Obeying Kashyapa's command, Shree Parashurama, the foremost among warriors, pushed back the sea to the distance reached by the flight of an arrow. Thus, carrying out the command of the Brahmana, he took up residence upon Mahendra, the excellent and foremost of mountains." – Shree Mahabharatam 7.70.21–23

The great sage Dhaumya, while describing the sacred pilgrimage places of the eastern region to Yudhisthira, also told Mount Mahendra as the abode of Lord Parashurama.
Mahendro nāma kauravya bhārgavasya mahātmanaḥ,
Ayajat tatra kaunteya pūrvam eva pitāmahaḥ.
“O descendant of Kuru! Mahendra is the abode of the great Bhargava. O son of Kunti! There, in ancient times, Lord Brahma performed a Yajna.” – Shree Mahabharatam 3.87.22

When Amba, the princess of Kashi, went to Saalva and was rejected by him, she came to the hermitage of ascetics seeking a solution to her predicament. At that time, Hotravaahana spoke these words to Amba there.
Hotravāhana uvāca–
Rāmaṃ drakṣyasi bhadre tvaṃ jāmadagnyaṃ mahāvane,
Ugre tapasi vartantaṃ satyasandhaṃ mahābalam.
Mahendraṃ vai giriśreṣṭhaṃ rāmo nityam upāsti ha,
Ṛṣayo vedavidvāṃso gandharvāpsarasas tathā. “Hotravaahana said – O noble lady! You shall see Parashurama, the son of Jamadagni, in a great forest. He is engaged in severe austerities; he is steadfast in truth and immensely powerful. Shree Parashurama constantly dwells upon Mahendra, the foremost of mountains. There also dwell Sages learned in the Vedas, as well as Gandharvas and Apsarases.” – Shree Mahabharatam 5.176.30–31

According to the Shree Mahabharatam 5.186.11, after fighting with Bheeshma, Lord Parashurama departed and went back to the Mount Mahendra, just as he had come.

॰ In the Shreemad Valmikiyaramayana, it's mentioned that Lord Parashurama returns to Mount Mahendra to perform penance after being defeated by Shree Rama:
Sa hatān dṛśya Rāmeṇa svā̃lokāṃstapasārjitān,
Jāmadagnyo jagāmāśu Mahendraṃ parvatottamam. "When Lord Parashurama, the son of Jamadagni, saw that the meritorious worlds he had attained through his austerities were being destroyed by Lord Shree Rama's arrow, he immediately set out for the sacred Mahendra Mountain." – Shreemad Valmikiyaramayana, Balakaandam, Sarga-76, Shloka-22

• Regarding those who had the meeting with Lord Parashurama on Mount Mahendra—
॰ In the Shree Mahabharatam, it's mentioned that the Pandavas journeyed to the country of Kalinga (present-day Odisha) as part of their pilgrimage. After bathing in the sacred Vaitarani River and offering oblations to their forefathers, they next went to Mount Mahendra to have the meet of Lord Parashurama. This pilgrimage and their meeting with Lord Parashurama are described in detail with four Chapters 114, 115, 116 and 117 of the Vana Parva of the Shree Mahabharatam. From these chapters, one verse is as follows:
Vaiśampāyana uvāca–
Tataś caturdaśīṃ Rāmaḥ samayena mahāmanāḥ,
Darśayāmāsa tān viprān dharmarājaṃ ca sānujam. "Shree Vaishampayana said – O Janamejaya! Thereafter, on the fourteenth lunar day, at the appointed time, the great-souled Parashurama granted his audience (appeared) to those Brahmanas who were living on that mountain (Mahendra Mountain) and to Yudhishthira, together with his brothers." – Shree Mahabharatam 3.117.16

According to the Shree Mahabharatam 1.129.53–54, Dronacharya went to Mahendra Mountain to receive the knowledge of Dhanurveda from Lord Parashurama. There he acquired complete knowledge of Dhanurveda as well as of all weapons.

According to the Shree Mahabharatam 12.2.14–18, Karna likewise went to Mahendra Mountain and received instruction in Dhanurveda from Lord Parashurama.

॰ In the Shreemad Bhagavatam, it's mentioned that when Lord Balarama went on a pilgrimage, He also visited this holy Mount Mahendra and meet Lord Parashurama:
Upaspṛśya Mahendrādrau,
Rāmaṃ dṛṣṭvābhivādya ca.
“At Mahendra Mountain, Lord Balarama had the blessed fortune of meeting Lord Parashurama and offered his obeisances unto him.” – Shreemad Bhagavatam 10.79.12

• Regarding to the Mount Mahendra which is one of the chief mountains—
॰ In the Shree Mahabharatam, it's mentioned that:
Mahendro malayaḥ sahyaḥ śuktimān ṛkṣavān api,
Vindhyaś ca pāriyātraś ca saptaitē kulaparvatāḥ. “Mahendra, Malaya, Sahya, Shuktimaan, Riksha Mountain, Vindhya, and Pariyaatra — these seven are the chief mountains.” – Shree Mahabharatam 6.9.11

Shree Mahabharatam 14.43.5 refers to mountains such as Mahendra as being among the lords of the mountains.

॰ The same subject is also described in Shree Vishnu Mahapuranam 2.3.3, in Verse-3 of Chapter-19 and Verses:19–20 of Chapter-27 of Shree Brahma Mahapuranam, in Verses:18–19 of the section describing Bharatavarsha in Shree Brahmanda Mahapuranam.

॰ In the Shreemad Bhagavatam 5.19.16, Mahendra Mountain is also mentioned in the section describing the mountains of Bharatavarsha.

• The Mount Mahendra is mentioned in other contexts as well—
॰ When Arjuna was travelling through the sacred places of the eastern region and, after passing through the land of Kalinga Country (present-day Odisha), proceeded toward Manipoor, he saw Mahendra Mountain:
Sa kaliṅgān atikramya deśān āyatanāni ca,
Harmyāṇi ramaṇīyāni prekṣamāṇo yayau prabhuḥ.
Mahendraparvataṃ dṛṣṭvā tāpasair upaśobhitam,
Samudratīreṇa śanair maṇipūraṃ jagāma ha. "Having crossed the land of Kalinga country, the mighty Arjuna proceeded onward, observing many regions, sacred places, and beautiful mansions. Having seen Mahendra Mountain, beautifully adorned with ascetic sages, he gradually proceeded along the seashore and reached Manipoor." – Shree Mahabharatam 1.214.12–13

॰ According to the Shree Mahabharatam 2.10.30, 32, there is also a reference to the Mount Mahendra and other mountains worshipping Lord Kubera.

॰ According to the Shree Mahabharatam 3.188.114, during the time of dissolution, great sage Maarkandeya entered the abdomen of the Lord and, while beholding the universe, is described as having seen Mahendra Mountain.

॰ According to the Shree Mahabharatam 5.11.11–13, after King Nahusha was installed in the position of Indra, he became attached to sensual pleasures and is described as sporting in various ways with Apsarases and divine maidens upon Mahendra and other mountains.

॰ The Mahendra Mountain came in the wedding of Lord Shiva and Goddess Parvati:
Karavīras tathaivāpi mahāvibhavasaṃyutaḥ,
Mahendraḥ parvataśreṣṭha ājagāma Himālayam. "Endowed with great wealth, Karaveera and the foremost of mountains, Mahendra, also came to the house of Himalaya." – Shree Shiva Mahapuranam 2.3.37.31

Conclusion:
From these various scriptural evidences, it is clear that Mahendra Mountain is an ancient and sacred mountain specially associated with Lord Parashurama.
