= R. Udayagiri =

- Village
- Ramagiri Udayagiri
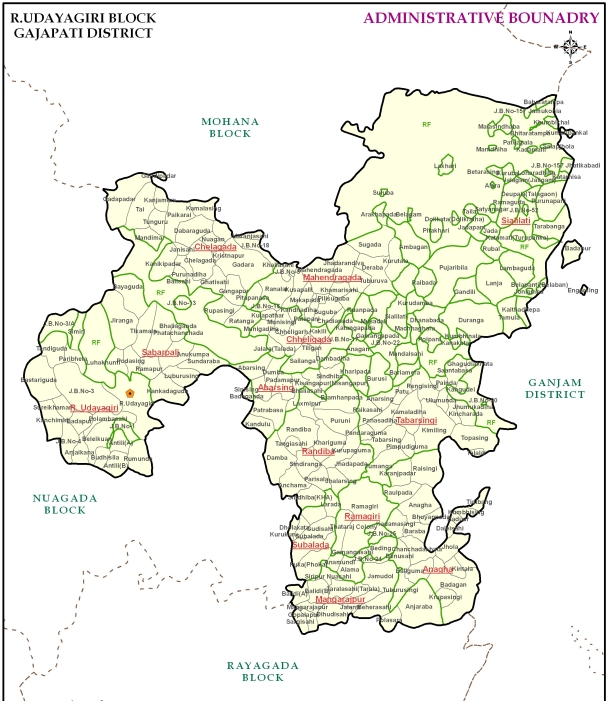

- Location in Odisha, India R. Udayagiri (India)
- Coordinates: 19.161850°N 84.144040°E
- Country: India
- State: Odisha
- District: Gajapati
- Established: 7 September 1953
- Founder: Government of Odisha
- Named for: Local Udayagiri Hill

Government
  - Type: Local Government
  - Body: Panchayat Samiti

Area
  - Total: 765.34 km^{2} (295.50 sq mi)

Population (2020)
  - Total: 90,774
  - Density: 118.61/km^{2} (307.19/sq mi)

Languages
  - Official: Odia, Sora
- Time zone: UTC+5:30 (IST)
- Postal code: 761016

R. Udaygiri is a village as well as tehsil and a community development block in the Gajapati District of Odisha, India. It is located 60 km from Paralakhemundi.

== Demographics ==
According to Census 2011 information, the sub-district code of R. Udaygiri block is 03102. There are about 292 villages in the R. Udaygiri block.

== Education ==
List of educational institutes in R.Udayagiri:

- Nodal U.P School
- Gopabandhu U.P School
- Govt. High School, R. Udayagiri
- Mahendrataneya Jr. college
- Arabindo School
- Saraswati Sishu Mandir
