= Gajapati district =

- District of Odisha
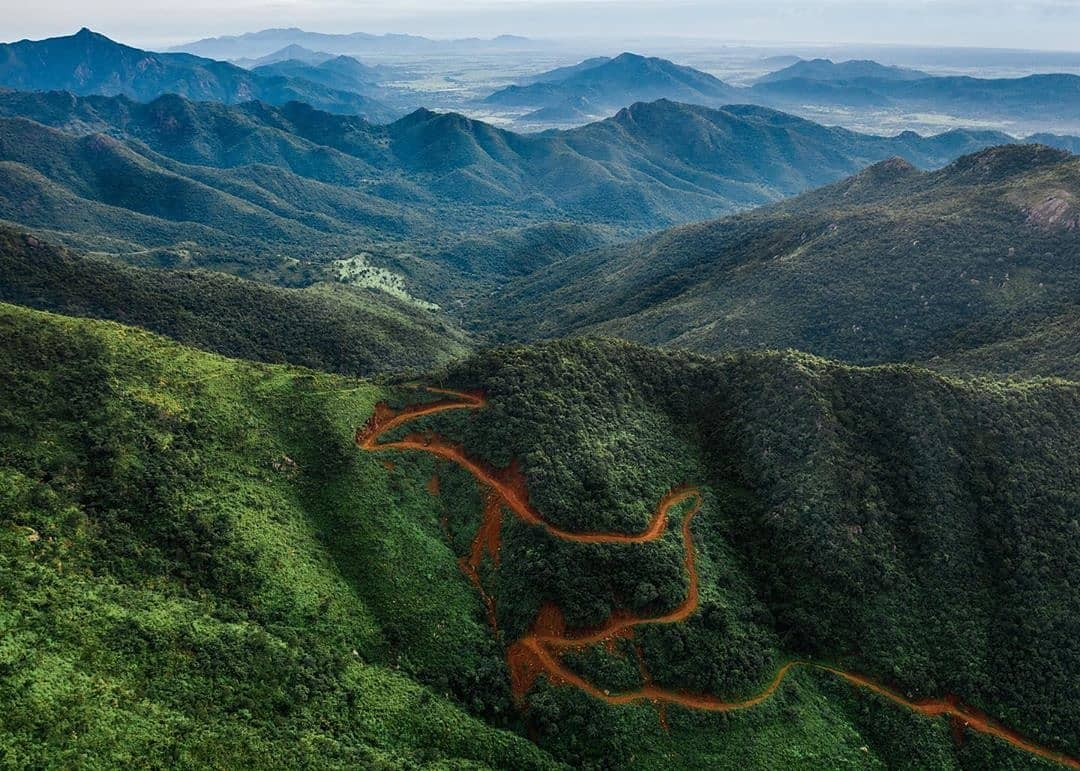
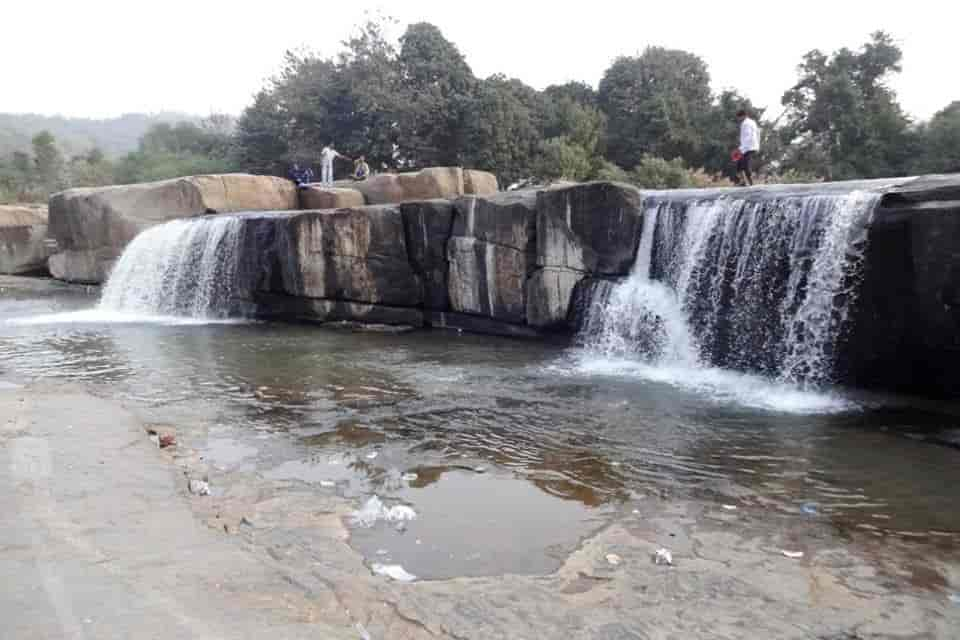
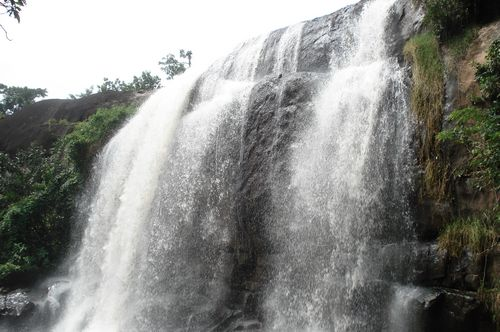
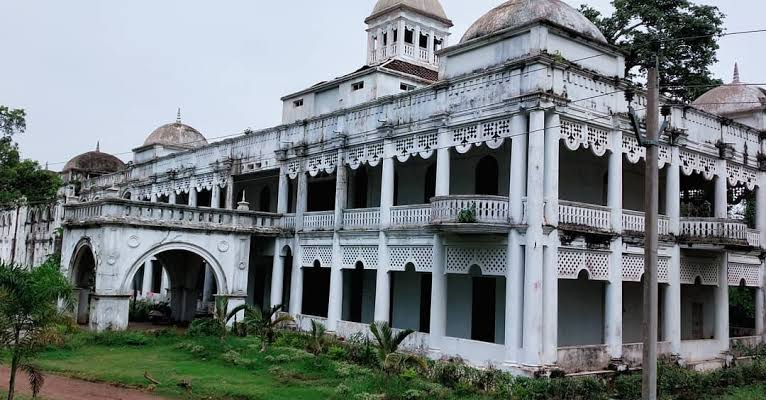
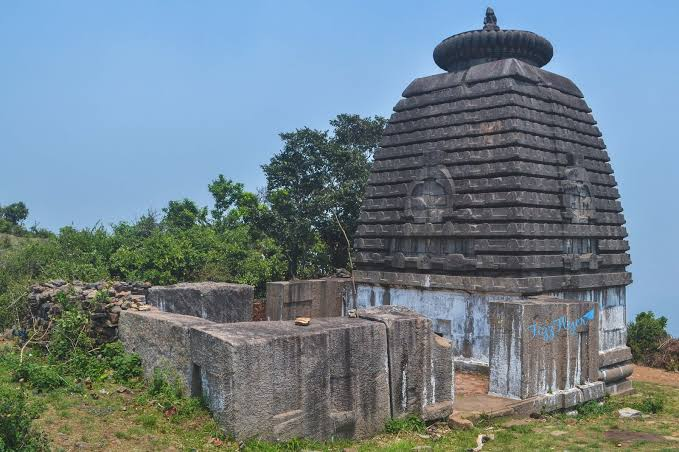
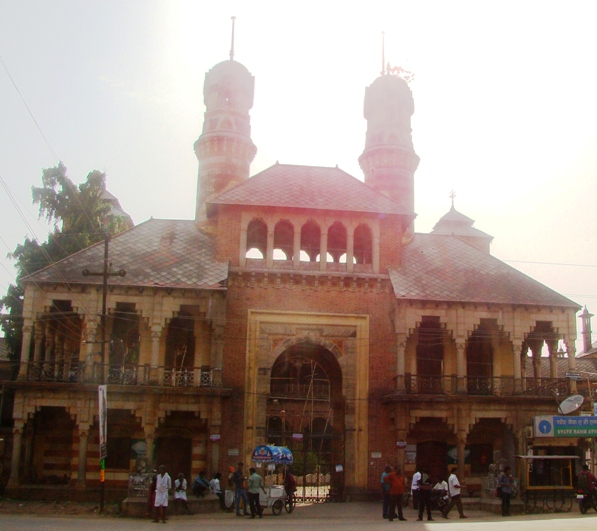
- Mahendragiri Mountains Khasada Waterfall Gandahati waterfall B.N. Palace, Paralakhemundi Mahendragiri Temple Padmasambhava Mahavihara monastery Gajapati Palace

- Coordinates: 19.03°N 84.2°E
- Country: India
- State: Odisha
- CD Blocks and Tahasils: 07
- District Formation: October 2, 1992; 33 years ago
- Founded by: Government of Odisha
- Named after: Maharaja Krushna Chandra Gajapati Narayan Deo
- Headquarter: Paralakhemundi
- CD Blocks and Tahasils: Gosani; Kashinagar; Gumma; Rayagada; Nuagada; R. Udayagiri; Mohana

Government
  - Type: Administrative District
  - Body: Government of Odisha
  - Collector & District Magistrate: Shri Akshay Sunil Agrawal, IAS
  - Superintendent of Police (I/C): Dr. Saravana Vivek M, IPS

Area
  - Total: 4,325 km^{2} (1,670 sq mi)
  - Rank: 16th
- Elevation: 1,501 m (4,925 ft)

Population (2026 projection)
  - Total: 652,495
  - Rank: 27th
  - Density: 170/km^{2} (440/sq mi)
- Demonym: Gajapatia

Languages
  - Official: Odia, English
  - Tribal: Sora • Kui
- Time zone: UTC+5:30 (IST)
- PIN: 761 XXX
- Telephone code: 06815 Paralakhemundi; 06816 Mohana; 06817 R. Udayagiri
- Vehicle registration: OD-20
- Nearest city: Brahmapur
- Sex ratio: 1043 ♀/♂
- Literacy: 69.09%
- House of the People Constituency: Brahmapur
- Legislative Assembly Constituency: 2: 136-Mohana(ST) 137-Paralakhemundi
- Climate: Aw (Köppen)
- Precipitation: 1,403.3 millimetres (55.25 in)
- Avg. summer temperature: 43 °C (109 °F)
- Avg. winter temperature: 09 °C (48 °F)
- Website: www.gajapati.nic.in

Gajapati district is a district of Odisha State in India. It was carved out of Ganjam District on October 2, 1992. As of 2011 it was the third least populous district of Odisha (out of 30), after Debagarh and Boudh.

Gajapati district was named after Krushna Chandra Gajapati Narayan Deb, the King of the Paralakhemundi estate and the first Prime Minister of Odisha, who is remembered for his contribution to the formation of a separate state, and inclusion of his estate in Odisha. The district headquarters in Paralakhemundi, formerly a Zamindari, is clustered within a radius of approximately 5 kilometers around its geometric center.

== History ==
The history of Gajapati district dates back to the Paralakhemundi Estate. It was part of the Gajapati Kingdom of Odisha. During the 12th century CE Paralakhemundi was part of the Khemundi state. During the reign of Mukunda Deba, Khemundi was trifurcated, creating three states: Bada Khemundi, Sana Khemundi, and Paralakhemundi. After the trifurcation, Subhalinga Bhanu became the ruler of the Paralakhemundi. This line of kings continued to rule Paralakhemundi throughout the Mughal and Maratha rule of Odisha. Before the British gained complete control over Odisha, Paralakhemundi became a feudal state under British rule in 1767, during the reign of Gajapati Jagannatha Narayanadev. The state had conflicts with British administrators, leading to the arrest of King Gajapati Jagannatha Narayanadev and his son. As a result, the state came under direct British supervision. However, a revolt broke out among the tribals and Paikas against the king's detention. Due to this uprising, the British reinstated the king to his position. Paralakhemundi remained under the administration as a feudatory state until its unification with Odisha.

In 1937, the first Governor of Orissa, Sir John Austin Hubback, invited Krushna Chandra Gajapati Dev to form the cabinet. Shri Gajapati became the first Prime Minister of Orissa, serving from April 1, 1937, to July 18, 1937. He held the position again for a second term from November 24, 1941, to June 30, 1944.

== Geography ==
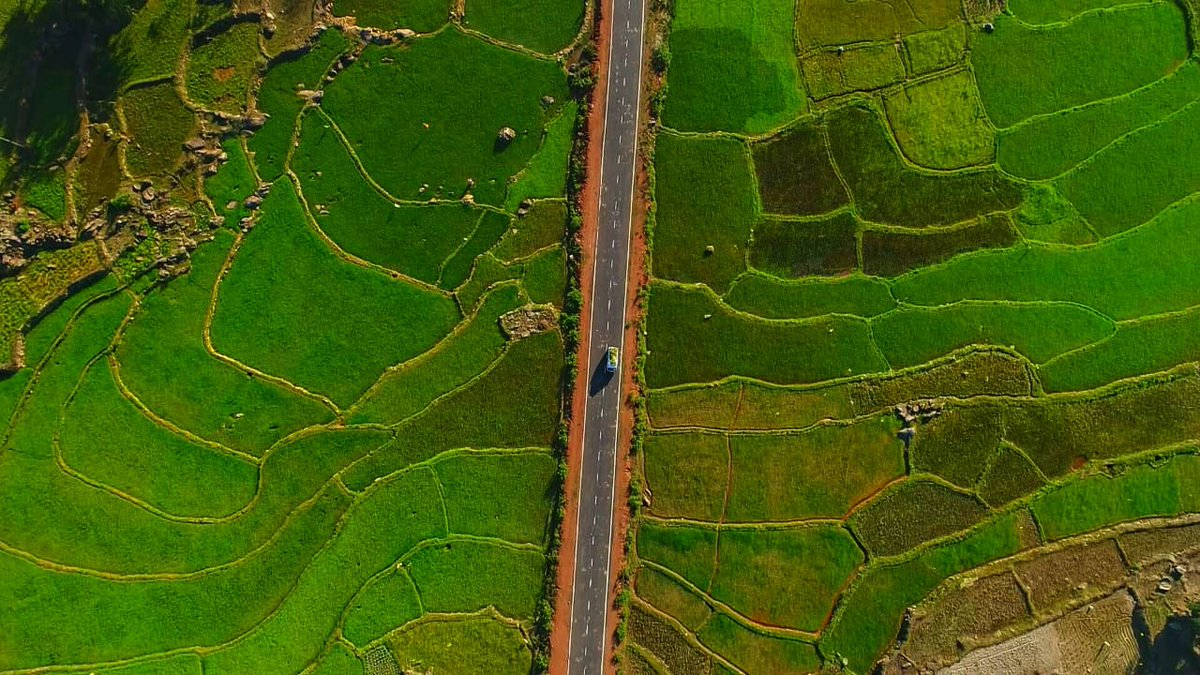
Paddy Fields around the road from Munising to Seranga in Gajapati District

Gajapati district is located in the southeastern part of Odisha, India, between 84°32'E and 83°47'E longitude and 18°44'N and 19°39'N latitude. It shares borders with Andhra Pradesh to the south, Rayagada district to the west, Ganjam district to the east, and Kandhamal district to the north. The district spans an area of 3,850 km² and is part of the Eastern Ghats, characterized by rugged terrain and narrow valleys.

The Mahendratanaya River, a tributary of the Banshadhara River, is the primary river flowing through the district. The highest peak in the district is Mahendragiri, standing at 1,501 meters (4,925 feet), followed by Dandamera Parbat at 1,103 meters (3,619 feet) and Tangiri Parbat at 1,155 meters (3,789 feet). The average elevation of Paralakhemundi, the district headquarters, is 145 meters (476 feet) above sea level.

== Climate ==
Gajapati district features a tropical monsoon climate with localized microclimates alternating between the coastal plains and the interior high-altitude regions of the Eastern Ghats.

- Temperature: The hot season peaks in May with average maximums reaching 38.5 °C (101.3 °F), while extreme heat waves can elevate inland temperatures up to 46 °C (115 °F). Mild winters lower temperatures to averages around 15 °C (59 °F).
- Precipitation: Rain is intensely seasonal; approximately 80% to 85% of the total annual precipitation is concentrated between June and September via the southwest monsoon.
- Humidity: Relative humidity peaks during the peak monsoon months, exceeding 80%, before declining steadily from late November onward.

Climate data for Gajapati district (Paralakhemundi)
Month	Jan	Feb	Mar	Apr	May	Jun	Jul	Aug	Sep	Oct	Nov	Dec	Year
Mean daily maximum °C (°F)	29.9 (85.8)	31.8 (89.2)	35.5 (95.9)	37.8 (100.0)	38.5 (101.3)	33.7 (92.7)	30.5 (86.9)	30.4 (86.7)	31.4 (88.5)	31.2 (88.2)	30.1 (86.2)	28.7 (83.7)	32.5 (90.5)
Mean daily minimum °C (°F)	15.2 (59.4)	17.5 (63.5)	21.0 (69.8)	24.3 (75.7)	26.2 (79.2)	25.8 (78.4)	24.5 (76.1)	24.4 (75.9)	24.4 (75.9)	23.0 (73.4)	19.3 (66.7)	15.4 (59.7)	21.8 (71.2)
Average precipitation mm (inches)	9.4 (0.37)	18.5 (0.73)	35.5 (1.40)	69.2 (2.72)	108.7 (4.28)	185.7 (7.31)	244.9 (9.64)	250.9 (9.88)	222.9 (8.78)	177.9 (7.00)	38.6 (1.52)	6.9 (0.27)	1,369.1 (53.90)
Average precipitation days	0.5	1.0	1.8	3.4	5.2	9.5	13.1	13.0	11.2	7.6	2.1	0.6	69.0
Average relative humidity (%)	68	69	71	74	75	80	85	86	84	81	73	67	76
Source 1: India Meteorological Department
Source 2: Central Ground Water Board

== Natural Resources ==
The district is endowed with significant forest cover, water bodies, and fertile soils, supporting its 65% agrarian population.

=== Forests ===
Covering 57% (2,49,958 hectares) of the total geographical area, the forests are categorized as:

- Reserved Forests (RF): 1,29,800 hectares
- Protected Reserved Forests (PRF): 57,600 hectares
- Demarcated Protected Forests (DPF): 45,200 hectares
- Undemarcated Protected Forests (UDPF): 14,100 hectares
- Village Forests (VF): 3,258 hectares

=== Water Bodies ===
The district has 1,698 water bodies, with 6 major reservoirs:

- Gajapati Sagar - 25.6 hectares
- Jagannath Sagar - 19.4 hectares
- Ram Sagar - 15.2 hectares
- Sita Sagar - 12.8 hectares
- Radha Sagar - 11.3 hectares
- Krishna Sagar - 10.9 hectares

=== Soil Types ===
- Alfisols (Red Sandy and Red Loamy Soils): 72% of the district’s area
- Entisols (Alluvial Soils): 21% of the district’s area
- Lateritic and Other Soils: 7% of the district’s area

These soil types are suitable for cultivating paddy, maize, pulses, and various horticultural crops.

=== Hydrology ===
The Mahendratanaya River, originating from Mahendragiri Hill, flows 72 km through the district, before merging with the Banshadhara River in Andhra Pradesh. The district’s rivers exhibit a dendritic drainage pattern, influenced by the Eastern Ghats’ geological formations.

=== Connectivity ===
Paralakhemundi, the district headquarters, is well-connected by road and rail networks.

Rail: The Paralakhemundi railway station (station code: PLH) is part of the Naupada-Gunupur branch line, connecting the town to Bhubaneswar (292 km), Visakhapatnam (236 km), and Kolkata (780 km).

Road: The town has state highway connectivity to:

- Brahmapur (128 km via NH-59)
- Rayagada (134 km via SH-4)
- Srikakulam (67 km via NH-16 and SH-5)

The total paved road length in the district is 2,450 km, of which 1,035 km are state highways, 612 km are district roads, and 803 km are rural roads.

== Administrative setup ==
The Gajapati district is administratively divided into one sub-division, comprising 7 Tahasils and 7 Blocks, as listed in the following table.

7 Blocks and Tahasils
#	Paralakhemundi Sub-Division
1	Gosani
2	Gumma
3	Rayagada
4	Nuagada
5	Mohana
6	Kashinagar
7	R. Udayagiri

There are 11 Police Stations under the two Police Districts in Ganjam Administrative district, which are listed in the following table.

11 Police Stations
#	Gajapati Police District
1	Adava P.S.
2	Mohana P.S.
3	Ramagiri P.S.
4	R. Udayagiri P.S.
5	Serango P.S.
6	Kashinagar P.S.
7	Paralakhemundi P.S.
8	Gurandi P.S.
9	Garabandha P.S.
10	Rayagada P.S.
11	Energy P.S. Paralakhemundi

== Economy ==
In 2006 the Ministry of Panchayati Raj named Gajapati one of the country's 250 most backward districts (out of a total of 640). It is one of the 19 districts in Odisha currently receiving funds from the Backward Regions Grant Fund Programme (BRGF).

== Demographics ==
Historical population
Year	Pop.	±%
1901	184,840	—
1911	205,514	+11.2%
1921	198,842	−3.2%
1931	225,161	+13.2%
1941	252,613	+12.2%
1951	262,998	+4.1%
1961	285,069	+8.4%
1971	348,964	+22.4%
1981	402,271	+15.3%
1991	454,708	+13.0%
2001	518,837	+14.1%
2011	577,817	+11.4%
2023	803,166	+39.0%
2025	826,127	+2.9%
Source: Census of India

=== Religions ===
1. Hinduism (61.1%)
2. Christianity (38.0%)
3. Muslim (0.27%)
4. Buddhism (0.38%)
5. Others (0.25%)

According to the 2011 census Gajapati district has a population of 814,722, approximate equal to the nation of Bhutan or the US state of North Dakota. This gives it a ranking of 573rd in India (out of a total of 766). The district has a population density of 212 inhabitants per square kilometre (550/sq mi). Its population growth rate over the decade 2001–2011 was 10.99%. Gajapati has a sex ratio of 1046 females for every 1000 males, and a literacy rate of 54.29%. 12.23% of the population lives in urban areas. Scheduled Castes and Scheduled Tribes make up 6.78% and 54.29% of the population respectively.

=== Language ===
A native speaker speaking Saura, the second largest spoken language of Gajapati

1. Odia (41.5%)
2. Saura (34.5%)
3. Telugu (15.5%)
4. Kui (5.54%)
5. Kuvi (1.25%)
6. Others (1.68%)

According to the 2011 Census of India, 41.51% of Gajapati district's population spoke Odia, followed by Sora (34.49%), Telugu (15.53%), Kui (5.54%), and Kuvi (1.25%) as their first language.

== Culture and Heritage ==
Gajapati district has a rich cultural and historical heritage, blending tribal traditions with ancient legends. Mahendragiri Mountain, part of the Eastern Ghats, is located in Paralakhemundi. According to legend, it is the abode of Lord Parashurama, a Chiranjeevi engaged in eternal tapasya. The site features temples believed to be built by the Pandabas, and Shivaratri is the main festival, dedicated to Lord Shiva, the guru of Parashurama.

The district’s culture is deeply influenced by the Saura tribe, known for Saura art (traditional wall paintings) and Tantangbo (tribal tattooing). Odia, Saura, and Kui are the primary languages spoken. Festivals like Makara Sankranti are celebrated with great fervor. The Gajapati Palace in Paralakhemundi stands as a testament to the region’s historical legacy. The Paika Akhada, once a warrior training tradition, is now performed as a martial dance showcasing combat techniques.

== Politics ==
=== State Legislative Assembly ===
The district has two assembly constituencies, represented by members from major political parties, Odisha Bidhana Sabha. The following is the two Vidhan sabha constituencies of Gajapati district and the elected members of those areas.

No.	Constituency	Reservation	Extent of the Assembly Constituency (Blocks)	Member of Legislative Assembly	Party
136	Mohana	ST	Mohana, R. Udayagiri, Nuagada, Rayagada	Dasarathi Gamango	INC
137	Parlakhemundi	None	Parlakhemundi (M), Kashinagar (NAC), Gumma, Kashinagar, Goshani	Er. Rupesh Kumar Panigrahi	BJD

=== House of the People ===
The district is part of the Brahmapur Parliamentary Constituency, electing a Member of Parliament (MP) to represent it in the Lok Sabha at the national level.

No.	Constituency	Reservation	Extent of the Parliamentary Constituency	Member of the Parliament	Party
20	Brahmapur	None	Paralakhemundi; Mohana (ST)	Dr. Pradeep Kumar Panigrahy	BJP
