= Sapua Dam =

Dam near Dhenkanal, Odisha, India

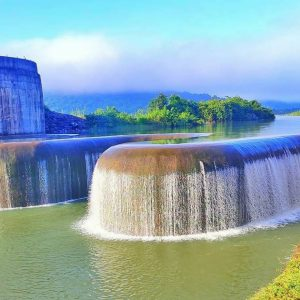
- Interactive map of Sapua Dam
- Official name: Sapua Dam
- Location: 35 km from Dhenkanal, Odisha
- Coordinates: 20.59°N 85.29°E
- Opening date: 2006

Dam and spillways
- Type of dam: Composite dam and reservoir
- Impounds: Sapua River
- Height: 26.75 m (88 ft)
- Length: 1,290 m (1 mi) (entire dam)
- Spillways: 2 gates
- Spillway type: Labyrinth with chute spillway un-gated
- Spillway capacity: 535 cubic metres per second (18,900 cu ft/s)

The Sapua Dam is built on the Sapua, a small Indian river which is a tributary of the Mahanadi River. It is located near Rasol in the Hindol block of Odisha's Dhenkanal district. The Dam is built at the starting point of the river. It is built for water reserve. It is located near Dandiri village, but the dam is situated in the Rasol panchayat area. The dam stands strongly by two small mountains. The nearest villages are Dandiri, Katha Khumpa, Rasol, Naukiari, Telibhuin, Kalingapal, Buhalipal, Anlabeda, and Bankatia.

== Construction ==
The dam is built as part of a Minor Irrigation project known as Sapua-Badajore Irrigation Project. Although the project was planned much before, the construction started in 1993 and got fully completed in 2006. With a maximum water storage level of 170 meter, the length of the dam is 1290 meter and height of 26 meter. The total command area of the project is 3682 hectares.

== Tourism ==
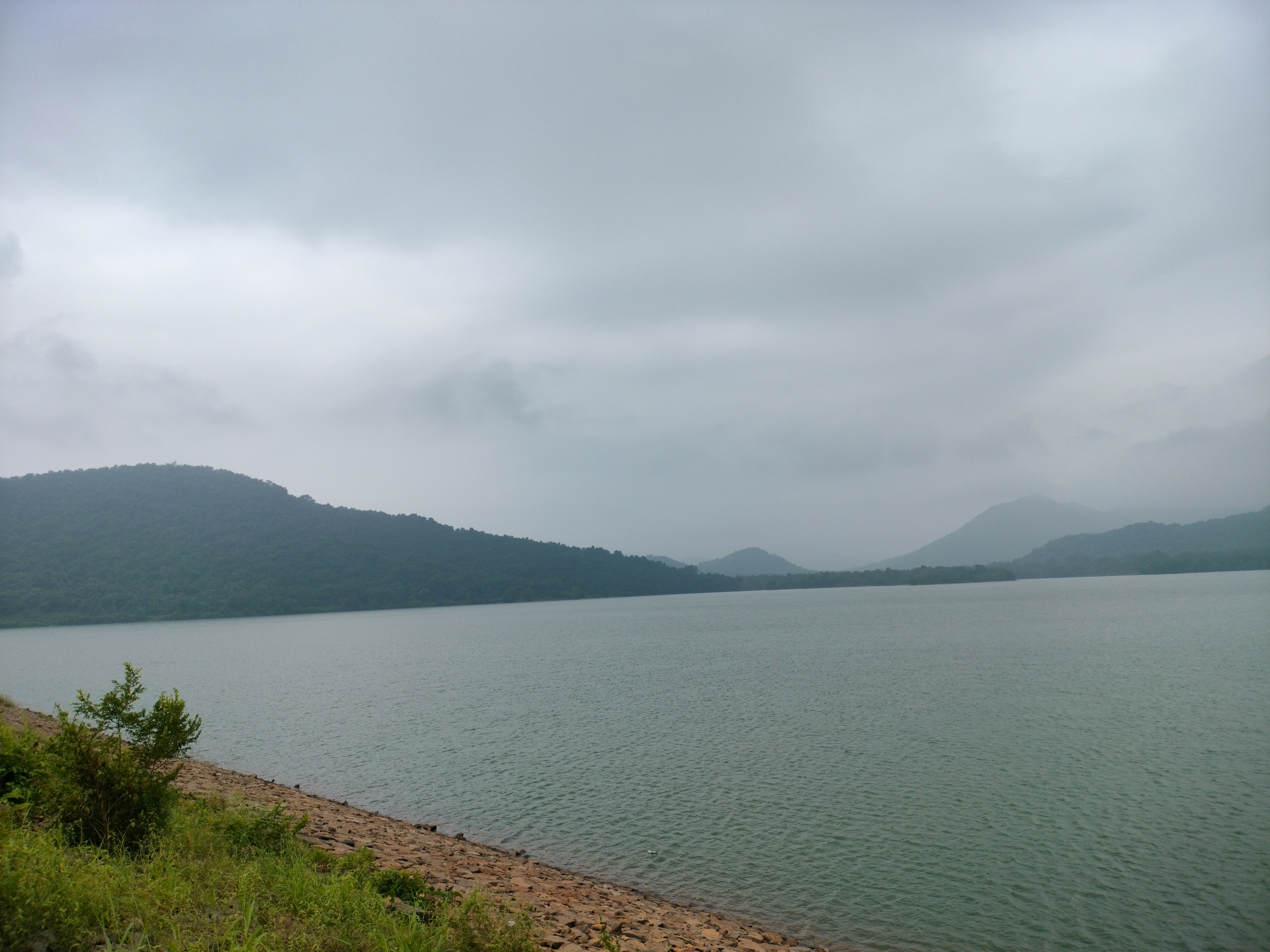
Scenic beauty of Sapua Dam reservoir

The Sapua Dam is nestled around 90 km away from Bhubaneswar in the mid of a saal foreste. The dam overlooks a bridge and the verdant mountains. This area is full of green forest and a picnic spot. Once it was a barred area, this zone is now used for camping, sightseeing and picnics by tourists.

The place is connected by road and 5 km away from Rasol (National Highway 655).

== Naming ==
Most tourists assume the name Sapua Dam to be derived from the snake like structure of the riverside fixed gates. However, the name is derived from the river Sapua. As per local tales, the river flows in a large snake like bed, from which the name of the river is derived.
