= Buhalipal =

Buhalipal Village, Odisha
- Buhalipal
- Flag
- Anthem: Bandē Utkaḷa Jananī
- Location within Odisha Location within India
- Coordinates: 20.640640°N 85.358183°E
- Country: India
- State: Odisha
- Dhenkanal: Hindol
- Founder: Government of Odisha
- Named for: For the hardworking people

Government
  - Type: Panchayat Raj
  - Body: Hindol Assembly constituency

Area
  - Rural: 2,428.114 ha (6,000.00 acres)

Dimensions
  - Length: 15.59 km (9.69 mi)

Population (2011)
  - Total: 4,000
- Time zone: UTC+5:30 (IST)
- PIN: 759021

Buhalipal is a village located in the Dhenkanal district of Odisha, India. It is surrounded by several villages, including Analabeda, Pasasing, Bidyadharapur, Kunua, Padhani, and Bankatia. The nearest market and Police station are located at Rasol, which is 5 km away from the village.

== Geography ==
Buhalipal situated at 20°38'26.1"N 85°21'29.4"E. The total geographical area of the village is 2428.114 hectares. Buhalipal village is situated 21.6 kilometers from the sub-district headquarters in Hindol, where the tehsildar office is located, and 38 kilometers from the district headquarters in Dhenkanal. According to data from 2009, Buhalipal is recognized as a gram panchayat. This village is an integral part of Hindol State, which was established during the period of British colonial rule.

The village has a total population of 4,000 individuals, comprising 2,200 males and 1,800 females. The literacy rate in Buhalipal is 75%, with 79.33% of males and 60.5% of females being literate. The village consists of approximately 750 households. The designated pin code for Buhalipal is 759021. The village is predominantly Hindu, with the residents practicing Vaishnavism. There are two schools, Buhalipal Government Primary School and Panchayat Government High School.

The village is also home to various cricket facilities, including the JCC Cricket Ground and the MBCC Football Field, and a number of temples. Sapua Dam is located nearby.
