= Rasol, Odisha =

Rasol
- Large Village (Proposed N.A.C.)
- Location in Odisha, India Rasol (India)
- Coordinates: 20.6193°N 85.3188°E
- Country: India
- State: Odisha
- District: Dhenkanal
- Elevation: 64 m (210 ft)

Languages
  - Official: Odia
- Time zone: UTC+5:30 (IST)
- PIN: 759021
- Vehicle registration: OD 06
- Website: odisha.gov.in dhenkanal.nic.in

Rasol is a village/Panchayat in Dhenkanal district, Odisha, India. It is about 40 kilometres (25 mi) from the district center of Dhenkanal, India. It is a focal point for nearby villages due to its important commercial market area. Rasol is surrounded by villages such as Kalingapal, Naukiari, Bahalunda, and Bankatia. The National Highway 655 (India) passes through Rasol.

== History ==
Rasol is an ancient village with a known history dating back 300 years. It was part of the Hindol State, which was one of the princely states of India during the period of the British Raj. Rasol was led by the Samanta Raja, who was appointed by the King of Hindol.

== Demography ==
The area falls under Rasol Panchayat of Hindol block. The population in 2019-20 was between 7,370 and 9,118, and the total number of households was 1,910.

Roads well connect Rasol with frequent bus services to Bhubaneswar, Cuttack, Dhenkanal, Anugul, Rourkela, and other district and state parts. The old Cuttack-Sambalpur road which is National Highway 655 (India) passes through Rasol.

Rasol has a sub-post office, police station, and primary dispensary. People from nearby villages are dependent on Rasol for services such as banking, health care, and marketing.

It is proposed to be a NAC (Nagar panchayat).

== Places of interest ==
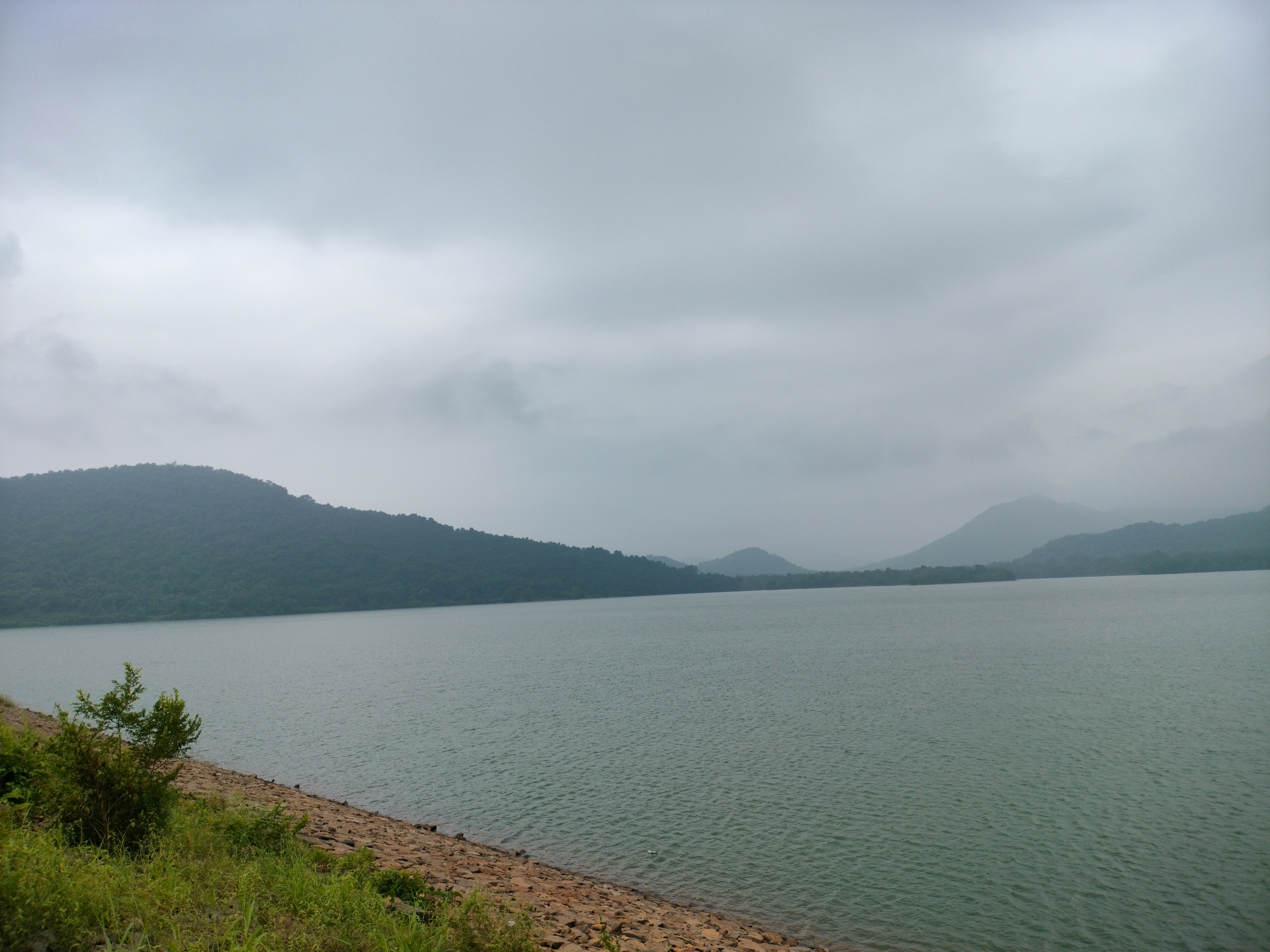
Sapua Dam in 2022

Sapua Dam is 5 km away from Rasol.

The best time to visit is between September and March.

The Ugreswar Mahadev Temple, Chitalpur is approximately 4 km away.

The most famous temple of Dhenkanal is Mata Sukiabauti temple which is situated at a distance of 5 km from Rasol.

== Schools ==
- Rasol High School
- Saraswati Shishu Mandir
- St. Xavier High School
- Rasol M. E school

== Festivals ==
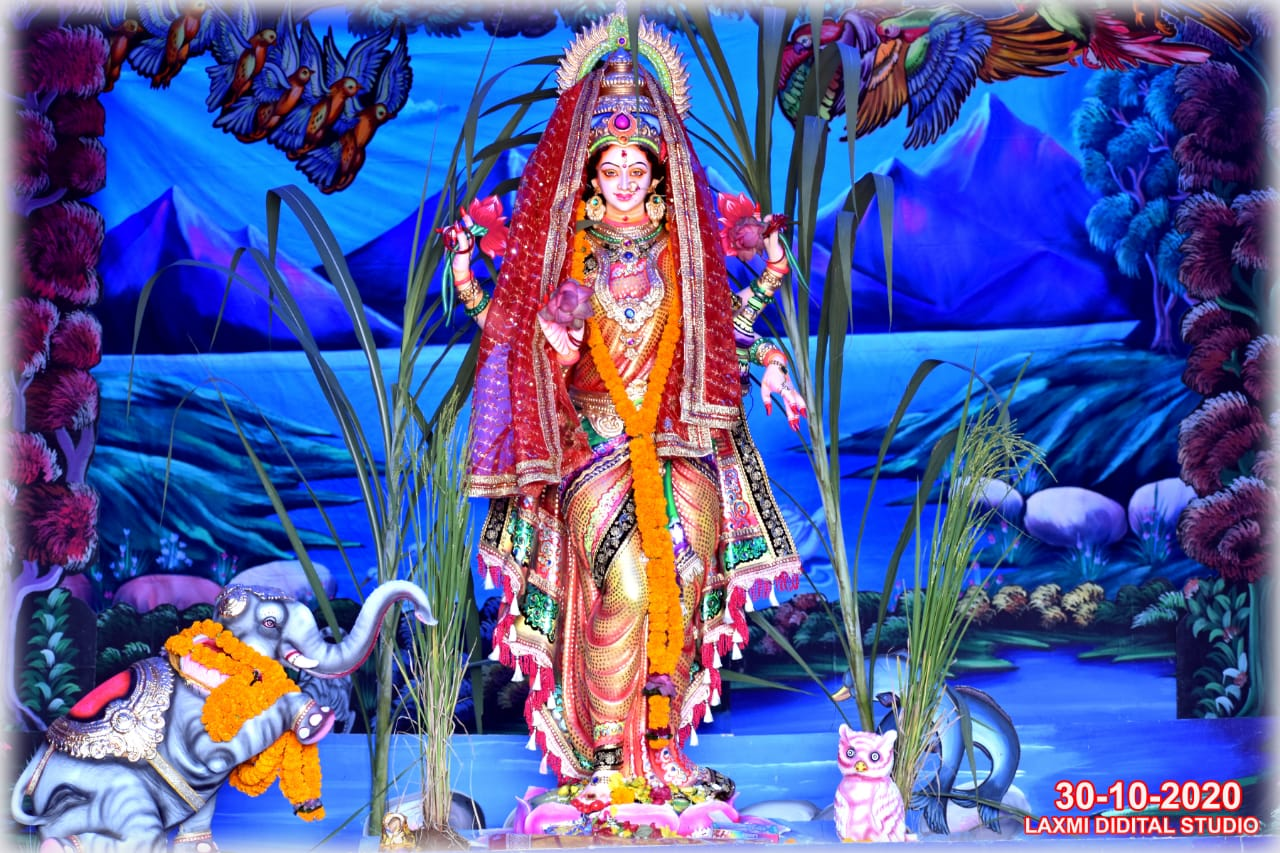
Rasol Laxmi Puja

There are multiple festivals observed in Rasol and the surrounding villages. The largest celebrations are during Dolajatra/Holi, Laxmi Puja, Jhamu Jatra, Janmashtami, and Ratha jatra.

A festival is celebrated in Rasol which is not celebrated anywhere else in the world. The name of that festival is Pana Yatra. This festival was started about 20-22 years ago. This festival is celebrated for 4 days every year. Pana Yatra falls on 13/14 April every year.

Laxmi Puja and Jhamujatra are of particular importance, and hence have large celebrations every year.
