= Kalingapal =

- village
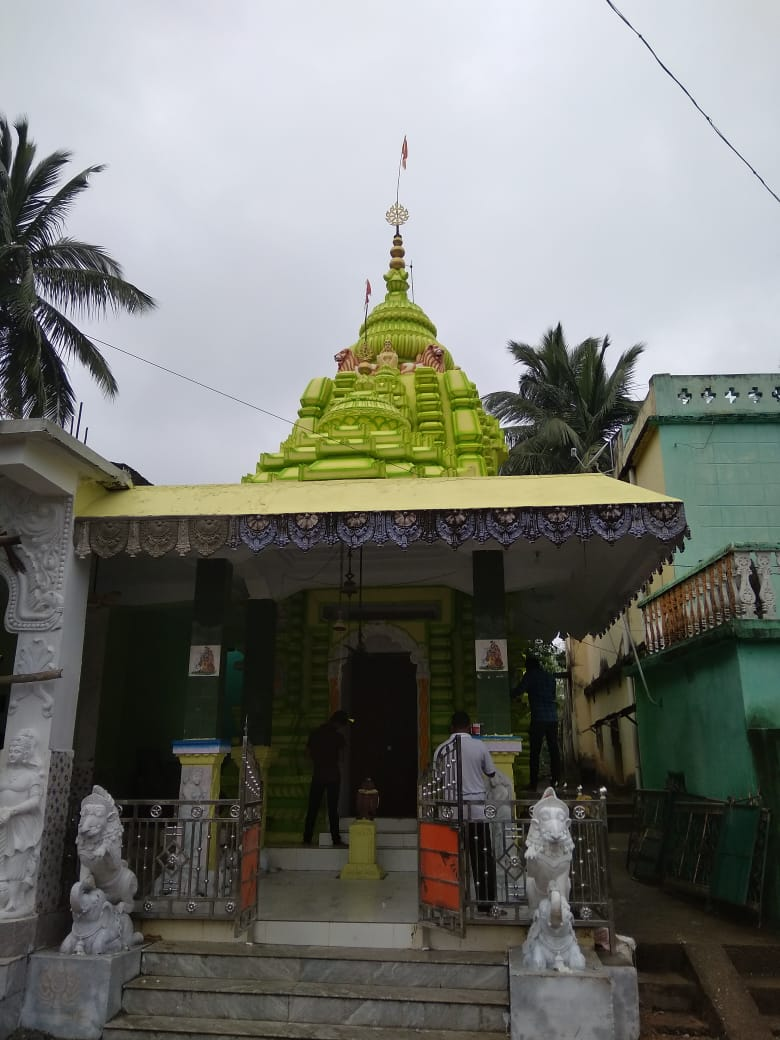
- Bankabihari Temple

- Location in Odisha, India Kalingapal (India)
- Coordinates: 20.6446°N 85.3253°E
- Country: India
- State: Odisha
- District: Dhenkanal
- Elevation: 64 m (210 ft)

Languages
  - Official: Odia
- Time zone: UTC+5:30 (IST)
- PIN: 759021
- Website: odisha.gov.in dhenkanal.nic.in

Kalingapal is a twin/composite village consisting of two revenue villages known as Kalinga and Palachakada. It also includes a hamlet known as Bandhanali. This village is in Dhenkanal district, Odisha, India. It is about 40 kilometres (25 mi) from district headquarter Dhenkanal . It falls under Rasol Police station, which is 2 kilometres (1.2 mi) from the village.

== History ==
This is an ancient village with a known history of 300 years and was part of Hindol State, which was one of the princely states of India during the period of the British Raj.

== Demography ==
The village falls under Kalinga Panchayat of Hindol block. The population is around 2500 (Including Kalinga and Palachakada) as per 2011 census.

The village is well connected with Roads and frequent bus services to Bhubaneswar, Cuttack, Dhenkanal, Anugul and other parts of the district and state. National Highway 655 (India) is just 2 km away from the village.

The village has a post office named Kalingapal.

== Schools ==
- Kalingapal High School
- KalingaPal UP School
- Sri Aurobindo Life Education Center

== Temples ==
Kalingapal has an ancient Kothaghara with the temple of Lord Bankabihari (Krishna). The village has also a Ram temple, a Kali temple and other small temples of village deities.

== Festivals ==
There are multiple festivals observed in the villages. However, there are grand celebrations of Dola jatra/Holi, Laxmi Puja, Meru Jatra, Janmastami and Ratha Yatra. The annual Astaprahari also being held in a grand manner every year. Other festivals like Khudurukuni, Jahni Osha, Raja, Makara Sankranti are also celebrated.
