= Dhenkanal (disambiguation) =

Dhenkanal is a town in Odisha, India.

Dhenkanal may also refer to:

- Dhenkanal district, Odisha, India
- Dhenkanal (Odisha Vidhan Sabha constituency)
- Dhenkanal (Lok Sabha constituency)
- Dhenkanal State, a princely state during the British Raj
- Dhenkanal College, a college in Dhenkanal district
- Dhenkanal railway station
