= Dudurkote =

- Interactive map of Dudurkote
- Coordinates: 20.61021°N 85.2010639°E
- Country: India
- State: Orissa
- District: Dhenkanal district
- Tehsil/Taluka: Hindol
- Pincode: 759020

Dudurkote is a small town in the subdivision of Hindol in the Dhenkanal District of Orissa state. It is located 18 kilometres (11 mi) from NH 55 to Gudiakateni and NH 655 is passed through Dudurkote. It is surrounded by reserve forest from the East, South and West. It was a part of the Hindol princely State before independence. It is 60 kilometres (37 mi) from Dhenkanal.

== History ==
Dudurkote is popularly known as Dudurkote Garha and the old capital of Hindol princely State, with the Orissa States Agency during the British Raj. After the East India Company occupied Orissa in September–October 1803, several treaties were signed with estates of the region, including Dudurkote and Hindol. After India gained independence, it merged into Republic of India in 1947.

== Festivals ==
Dudurkote witnesses 10 festivals every year, of which three are major. The most important of these are the Rath Yatra, Dussehra, Bhagavad Temple Puja, Ramachandi Puja, Dulla Purnima, Laxmi Puja, Pana Sankranti, Danda Puja, Sabitri Puja, Astapahari Puja,
