= National Highway 55 (India) =

National highway in India

National Highway 55

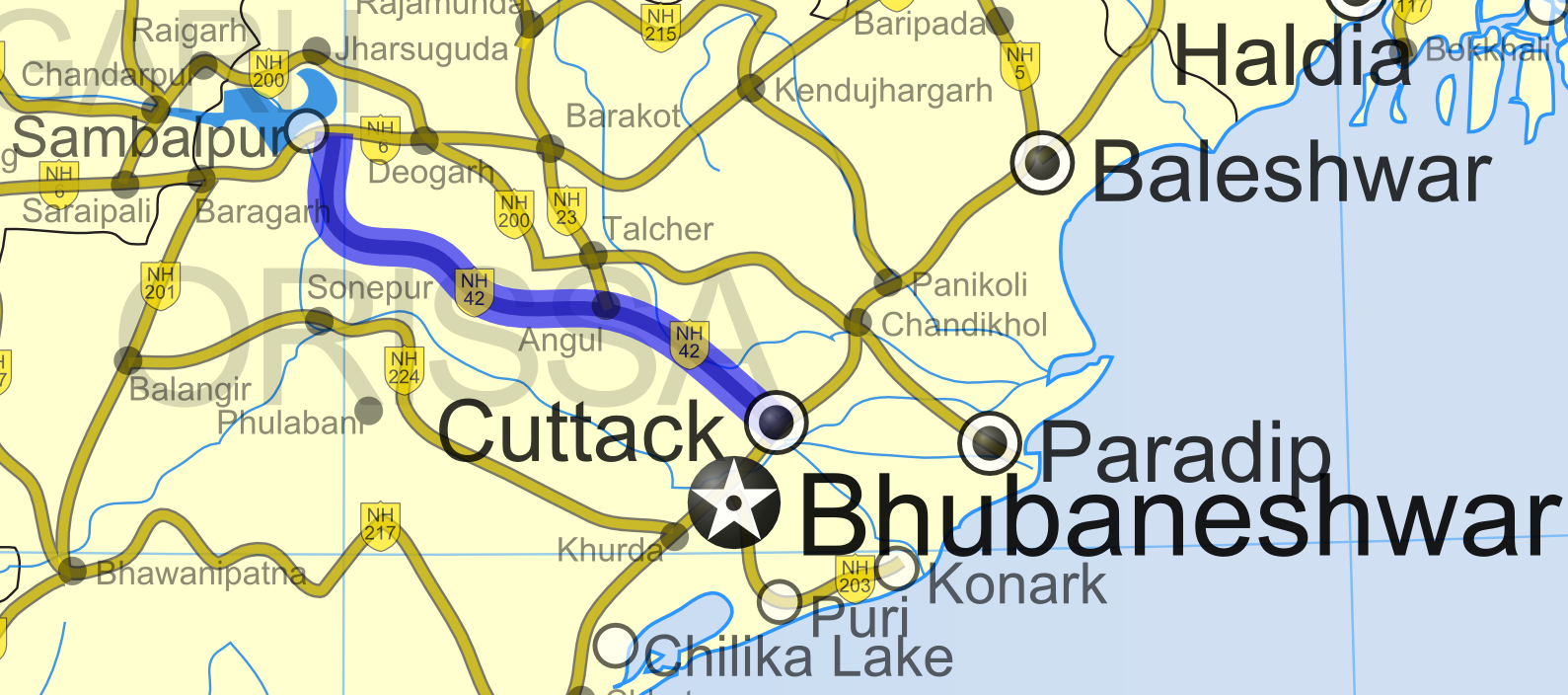

Route information
- Length: 265 km (165 mi)

Major junctions
- West end: NH 53 in Sambalpur
- NH 153B in Redhakhol, NH 149 / NH 655 in Angul NH 655 in Khuntuni
- East end: NH 16 in Cuttack

Location
- Country: India

Highway system
- Roads in India; Expressways; National; State; Asian
← NH 53	→ NH 16

National Highway 55 (Previously NH42) is a National Highway in India connecting Sambalpur and Cuttack in Indian state of Odisha. Starting from NH 53 in Maneswar, Sambalpur, it terminates at NH 16 in Manguli(Cuttack). it is also known as Cuttack – Sambalpur Highway. Before renumbering of national highways of India, route of NH-55 was part of old national highway 42. This national highway is 265 km (165 mi) long. It acts as an alternate route of NH 53 between Sambalpur & Panikoilii.

== Routes ==
NH-55 connects Maneswar at Sambalpur, Redhakhol, Bamur, Boinda, Badakera, Angul, Dhenkanal, and terminates at Manguli near Cuttack and Jagatsingpurin the state of Odisha.

== See also ==
- List of national highways in India
- List of national highways in India by state
