= Bhagirathipur, Dhenkanal =

Coordinates: 25°30′N 82°21′E

Bhagirathipur is a village in Dhenkanal district, Odisha, India. It is about 15 kilometres (9.3 mi) from Dhenkanal on the road to Sarakpatna. The nearest small town is Bhapur, which is 4 kilometres (2.5 mi) from the village.

== Population ==
Population of the village is about 2,500. it's 2900

== Economy ==
The major industries are farming and the making and selling of Kansa basana. People usually travel to Nuahata for their shopping.

== Festivals ==
- Jhamu Jatra
