= Joranda Road railway station =

Railway station in Odisha, India

Joranda Road

General information
- Location: Gadagovindpur, Rahangol, Dhenkanal district, Odisha; India
- Coordinates: 20°37′24″N 85°38′25″E
- Elevation: 61 metres (200 ft)
- System: Indian Railways station
- Owner: Indian Railways
- Line: Cuttack–Sambalpur line
- Platforms: 2
- Tracks: 2

Construction
- Structure type: Standard (on ground)
- Parking: Yes

Other information
- Status: Functioning
- Station code: JRZ
- Zone(s): East Coast Railway
- Division(s): Khurda Road

History
- Opened: 1998

Services
| Preceding station | Indian Railways | Following station |
|---|---|---|
| Shyama Charanpur Halt towards ? | East Coast Railway zone Cuttack–Sambalpur line | Rajathgarh Junction towards ? |
Location
- Location within India Location within Odisha

Joranda Road railway station is a railway station on Cuttack–Sambalpur line under the Khurda Road railway division of the East Coast Railway zone. The railway station is situated at Gadagovindpur, Rahangol, Dhenkanal in Dhenkanal district of the Indian state of Odisha.
