= Shyama Charanpur Halt railway station =

Railway station in Odisha, India

Shyama Charanpur Halt

General information
- Location: Shyamacharanpur, Dhenkanal, Dhenkanal district, Odisha; India
- Coordinates: 20°38′33″N 85°36′59″E
- Elevation: 96 metres (315 ft)
- System: Indian Railways station
- Owner: Indian Railways
- Line: Cuttack–Sambalpur line
- Platforms: 2
- Tracks: 2

Construction
- Structure type: Standard (on ground)
- Parking: Yes

Other information
- Status: Functioning
- Station code: SCPR
- Zone(s): East Coast Railway
- Division(s): Khurda Road

History
- Opened: 1998

Services
Preceding station	Indian Railways	Following station
Dhenkanal towards ?	East Coast Railway zone Cuttack–Sambalpur line	Joranda Road towards ?
Location
- Location within India Location within Odisha

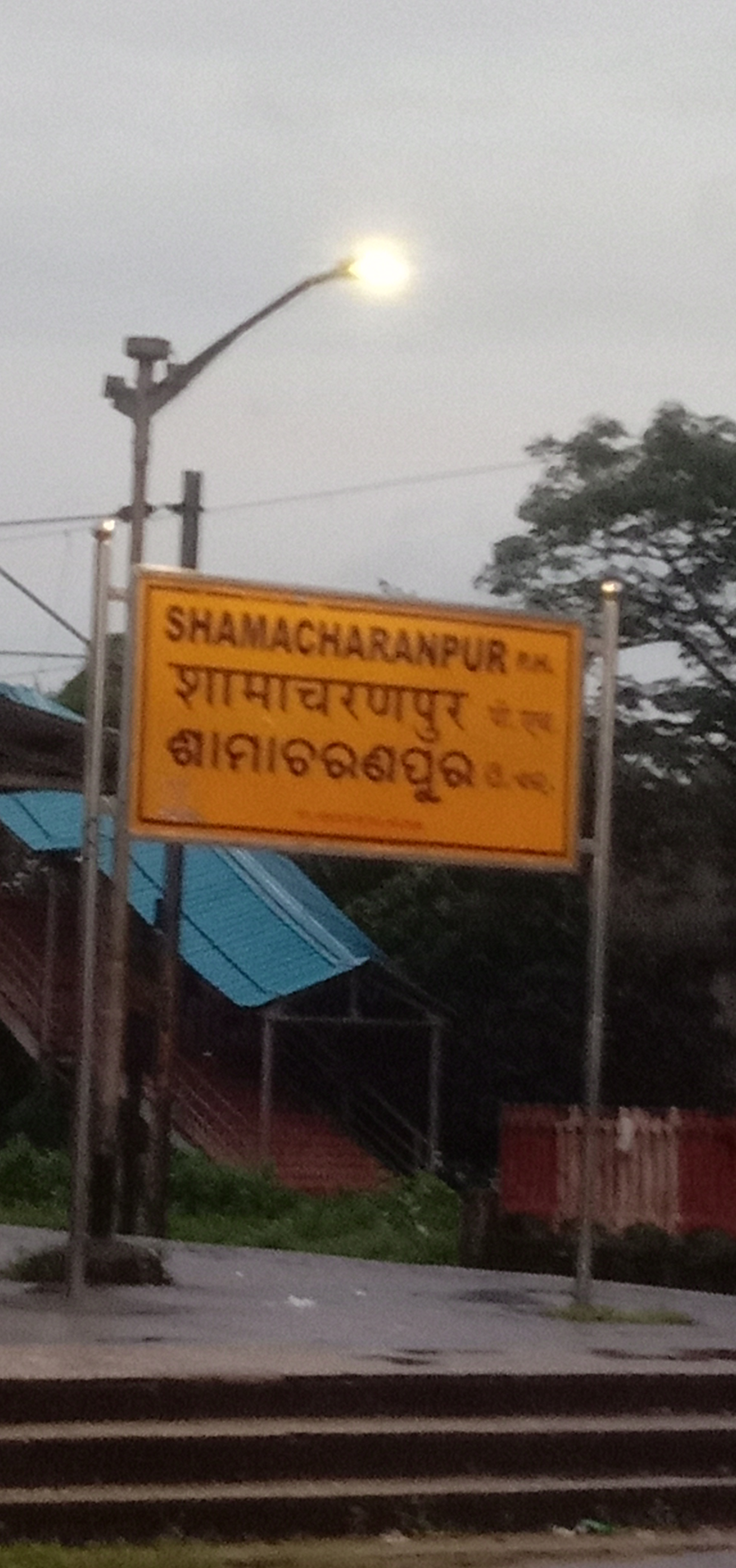
Shyama Charanpur Halt railway station

Shyama Charanpur Halt railway station is a halt railway station on Cuttack–Sambalpur line under the Khurda Road railway division of the East Coast Railway zone. The railway station is situated at Shyamacharanpur, Dhenkanal in Dhenkanal district of the Indian state of Odisha.
