= Jhimiripali =

- Village
- Location in Odisha Jhimiripali (India)
- Coordinates: 21°27′N 85°11′E
- Country: India
- State: Odisha
- District: Angul

Languages
  - Official: Odia
- Time zone: UTC5:30 (IST)
- Vehicle registration: OD-35 (Talcher); Nearest RTO; OD-28 (Deogarh)

Jhimiripali is a small village in Angul district, Pallahara block in the Indian state of Odisha. It is 91 kilometres (57 mi) by road north of Angul. Not far from the banks of the Rengali Reservoir to the west, the Malayagiri Forest Range is to the southeast.

== History ==
Jhimiripali was a relatively large princely state. The Sankaracharya had come to this village to visit the new Rameshwar temple. He drew a crowd of some 25,000. Central minister Dharmendra Pradhan came on the second anniversary of this temple. This temple was financed by the Danda party. Before that this temple name was Sapneswar. The Danda party was formed by Kulha Mahakul who was Danda's guru. Nearer the Temple is a banyan tree on which Shiva appeared as a snake.

== Culture ==
Culture in Jhimiripali includes Astaprahari, Shiva Ratri, Danda Nrutya and anniversary of Rameswar temple.
