= Kalyani Gajapati =

Head of the Paralakhemundi Ganga dynasty and Indian politician

- Titular Head of the Paralakhemundi Estate

Head of the Paralakhemundi Ganga dynasty
- Reign: 10 January 2020 – present (titular)
- Predecessor: Gopinath Gajapati Narayan Deo
- Born: Kalyani Devi; 1969 (age 56–57)
- Dynasty: Eastern Ganga (Paralakhemundi branch)
- Father: Gopinath Gajapati Narayan Deo
- Mother: Purna Devi

Personal details
- Party: Biju Janata Dal (2019–present)
- Occupation: Estate manager, Politician

Kalyani Gajapati (born c. 1970), also known as Kalyani Devi, is the current titular head of the Paralakhemundi Ganga dynasty and a politician from the Indian state of Odisha. Upon the death of her father in 2020, she became the 17th head—and the first woman to hold the position—of the Paralakhemundi branch of the historical Eastern Ganga dynasty. She is affiliated with the Biju Janata Dal (BJD) political party.

== Early life and education ==
Kalyani Gajapati was born into the Paralakhemundi royal family, the daughter of Gopinath Gajapati Narayan Deo, a two-term Member of Parliament, and Purna Devi, the princess of Dharampur state. She is the great-granddaughter of Maharaja Krushna Chandra Gajapati, a key architect of the modern linguistic state of Odisha and its first Prime Minister.

Kalyani spent the majority of her early life away from the Gajapati Palace in Paralakhemundi. She received her education in Bangalore and later resided in Chennai, Tamil Nadu, visiting the family estate in Odisha only occasionally. Her younger brother, Digvijay, died by suicide in 2015, leaving Kalyani as the immediate heir to the family's legacy.

== Royal succession and estate disputes ==
In August 2016, the Gajapati Palace became the center of a major public controversy following allegations that Gopinath Gajapati, whose health was rapidly deteriorating, was being held in isolation and neglected by his palace manager and her siblings. The dispute gained widespread media attention, with local civil society and political leaders demanding intervention.

Kalyani formally intervened by petitioning Chief Minister Naveen Patnaik to initiate a comprehensive inquiry into the royal family's property transactions over the preceding decades. Under pressure from the district administration and the state government, Gopinath was evacuated from the palace and relocated to a private hospital in Chennai, where Kalyani oversaw his medical care. The controversy culminated shortly afterward in the suicides of the former palace manager and three of her siblings amidst an ongoing police investigation into the alleged misappropriation of royal assets.

Gopinath Gajapati died on 10 January 2020 in Bhubaneswar at the age of 76. On the same day, Kalyani was crowned the 17th titular head of the dynasty. A traditional coronation puja was performed at the Ramaswami temple near the palace, after which she was taken in a procession to the Darbar Hall to ascend the throne, marking the first time a woman assumed the leadership of the Paralakhemundi royal house. Her first official order following her coronation was to arrange the state funeral and cremation of her father.

== Political career ==
Kalyani formally entered state politics ahead of the 2019 general elections, joining the ruling Biju Janata Dal (BJD) in February 2019.

She was fielded as the BJD candidate for the Paralakhemundi Assembly constituency in the 2019 Odisha Legislative Assembly election. The campaign highlighted her royal lineage and her grandfather's legacy in the region. However, in a heavily fractured multi-cornered contest, she was unsuccessful, finishing in third place with 26,645 votes (18.26% of the vote share). The election was won by Koduru Narayana Rao of the Bharatiya Janata Party (BJP), with Independent candidate Trirupati Panigrahy finishing second.Following the electoral defeat, she has maintained a focus on estate management and regional cultural affairs.

== See also ==
- Parlakhemundi Ganga dynasty
- Gopinath Gajapati Narayan Deo
- Gajapati Palace
- Eastern ganga dynasty
