= Anantashayana Vishnu =

Recurring theme in Hinduist art

Anantashayana Vishnu, Saranga
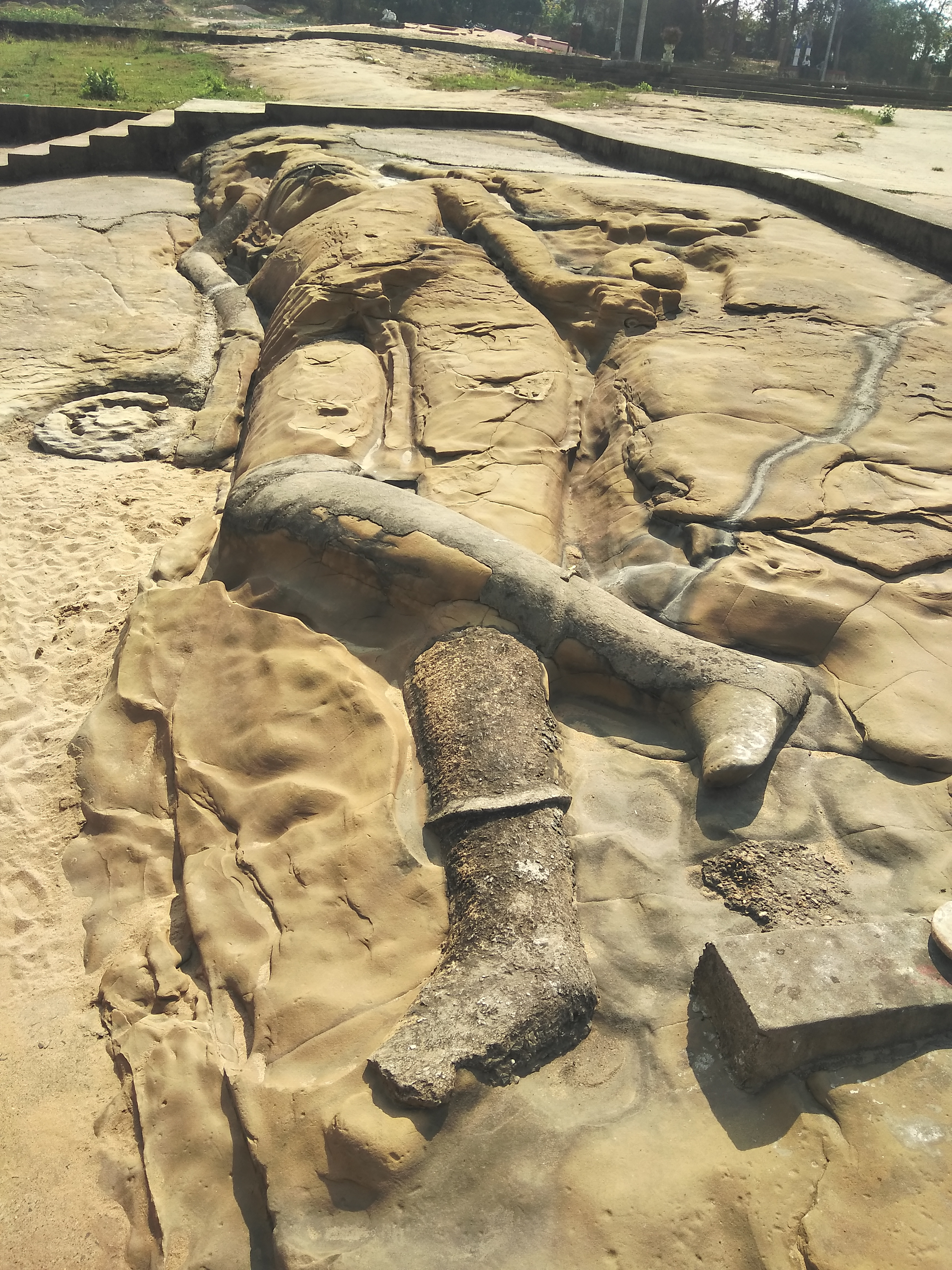
- Anantashayana Vishnu, Saranga

- = Anantashayana Vishnu, Saranga

Religion
- Affiliation: Hinduism
- District: Dhenkanal district
- Deity: Vishnu

Location
- Location: On the left bank of the Brahmani River
- State: Orissa
- Country: India
- Interactive map of Anantashayana Vishnu, Saranga
- Coordinates: 20°55′43.34″N 85°14′48.74″E

Architecture
- Completed: 9th Century
- Elevation: 61 m (200 ft)

Anantashayi Vishnu, also known as Anantashayana Vishnu (both literally "sleeping on the serpent Ananta"), and Garbhodaxyi Vishnu is a large open air horizontal rock relief of the Hindu god Vishnu, carved during the early 9th century in Saranga village, under the Parjang police station, in the Dhenkanal district of Orissa, India. It is located on the left bank of the Brahmani River. It is the largest such exposed rock cut structure in the horizontal position in the whole of India, measuring 15.4 metres (51 ft) in length, while the largest standing image is of Gomateshwara in Southern India. It is a protected monument maintained by the Archaeological Survey of India, Bhubaneswar Circle. Worship is still offered to the four armed reclining Vishnu.

== Location ==
The Vishnu image, located on the left bank of the river bed of the Brahmani River, is at an elevation of 200 feet (61 m). It is accessible by road over a distance of 1.5 kilometres (0.93 mi) from Saranga Village in Parajanga Tehsil of Dhenkanal district, 67 kilometres (42 mi) from Dhenkanal, 23 km from Angul and 3 kilometres (1.9 mi) from Talcher. It is also approached from the National Highway 42 from Cuttack to Sambalpur, on branch road over distance of 3 km. The second natural rock-cut image in parent rock is at Bhimakand in Talcher subdivision of the Dhankal district.

== History ==
The image was carved during the first quarter of the 9th century CE when the Bhauma-Kara that ruled in central part of Orissa. It has been analysed on the basis of its "idiom and crown" and dated to belong to later part of the Bhaumakara reign. Historical records also indicate that the Nandodhbahav feudatory rulers, under the Bhaumakara kings, who were followers of Vaishnavism (the Hindu sect which worships Vishnu as the Supreme God), were instrumental in getting the carvings of two large rock-cut images of Vishnu - the one at Saranga and the other at Dankal, in the upper Brahmani River valley. The Bhaumakara kings asserted their association with Vaishnavism in the grants that they provided to carve the rock-cut sculptures and temples as recorded on the occasion of the celebrations of Vishuvazakranthi and Devtesvaduadasi.

It is also reported that the urge to create these carved sculptures with deep expressions of "vigour and vitality" was inspired from the expressions depicted in the rock cut temples at Ellora and Elephanta in Maharashtra, and Mahabalipuram temples in Tamil Nadu. Such carvings on entrance gates or central part of regular temple lintels have been noted in the Rajeevlochana temple at Rajim and the Lakshmana temple in Sirpur, which were forerunners for its adoption under the Bhaumakara kingdom.

== Description ==
The Vishnu image, under the open sky, occupies an area measuring 15.4 metres (51 ft) in length and 7 metres (23 ft) in width with a thickness of 0.7 metres (2 ft 4 in). The image is of the Hindu god Vishnu in a reclining position (Anantashayana in Sanskrit, literally sleeping on the serpent Ananta). The image is carved out of natural rock of sandstone formation. He has four arms, holding a Chakra in the upper right hand, a Shankha in his upper left hand, a Gada and a symbolic lotus on its lower left hand. The hoods of the serpent Shesha (Ananta) covering the head of Vishnu. The Vishnu image has a sharp chin, distinctive nose and wears a crown on its head, called kiritamukuta (a tall conical crown, typically worn by Vishnu). A lotus design shown sprouting from his navel has the creator god Brahma, sitting in meditation. Another image in the same district also carved in sandstone in a reclining posture is in Khamkanaga Subdivision, in Angul district of 41.5 feet (12.6 m) length (as against the length of 15.4 metres (51 ft) image in Saranga village. The sculptor has imagined the river bank conceptually to represent the Kshirasagara (cosmic ocean) from which Brahma created the world. The shrine is regularly worshipped by local people. The Archaeological Survey of India is renovating this sculpture regularly and has kept it in a good condition. Floods in Brahmani River are the only threat to the image as this is built by sandstone in the river bed, which could erode.

== See also ==
- Reclining Buddha
