= Devendra Satpathy =

Indian politician

Member of Parliament, Lok Sabha
- In office 1971–1980
- Preceded by: Kamakhya Prasad Singh Deo
- Succeeded by: Kamakhya Prasad Singh Deo
- Constituency: Dhenkanal, Odisha

Personal details
- Born: 9 September 1929 Baudh, Phulbani District, Madras Presidency, British India (present-day Odisha, India)
- Died: 26 June 1990 (aged 60) Bhubaneswar
- Party: Indian National Congress
- Other political affiliations: Janata Party
- Spouse: Nandini Satpathy
- Children: Tathagata Satpathy; Suparno Satpathy

Devendra Satpathy was a hero of India's freedom struggle. He was a member of the Prajamandal movement. He was a lead member of Sri. Aurobindo Ashram In the 1971 election he was elected to the Lok Sabha from Dhenkanal in Odisha.He was a famed Parliamentarian. His spouse, Smt Nandini Satpathy, was the first woman Chief Minister of Odisha from Dhenkanal.He was former editor of Odia daily newspaper, Dharitri. He was a student at Christ College in Cuttack..
