= Janhitaila =

- Village
- Janhitaila village (south-west view)

- Location in Orissa, India
- Coordinates: 20.713121°N 85.552203°E
- Country: India
- State: Odisha
- District: Dhenkanal

Government
  - Body: Gram panchayat

Population (2011)
  - Village: 264
  - Rural: 264
- Postal code: 759013

Village god

Village poet Dhruba Charan Swain

Janhitaila is a village in Dhenkanal district, Odisha, India.

== Geography ==
This small village is situated 9 kilometres (5.6 mi) north of its district headquarters at Dhenkanal and 67 kilometres (42 mi) from the state capital at Bhubaneswar. Nearby villages include Gengutia, Barada, Asanabahali and Ranapasi.

== Demography ==
According to the 2011 census of India, Janhitaila had a population of 264, spread among 58 households. The female population was 47.7%. The literacy rate was 78.0% for the whole village; female literacy was 69.0%.
