= Gohirakhol =

Coordinates: 20.630164°N 85.525006°E

Gohirakhol is a small village between Bhapur and Dhenkanal, India. It is about 7 km from Dhenkanal.

== Income ==
People in Gohirakhol primarily receive their income from farming, working in Jute Mills, and working in various shops.

== Post Office ==
- Bhaliabol Kateni
