= Gopinath Gajapati =

Indian politician (1943–2020)

Member: 9th and 10th Lok Sabha
- In office 1989–1996
- Preceded by: Jagannath Rao
- Succeeded by: P. V. Narasimha Rao
- Constituency: Berhampur

Personal details
- Born: Gopinath Gajapati Narayan Deo; 6 March 1943 Paralakhemundi, Odisha, India
- Died: 10 January 2020 (aged 76) Bhubaneswar, Odisha, India
- Party: Congress
- Other political affiliations: BJP (1998-2009), BJD (2009-2020)
- Spouse: Purna Devi Gajapati
- Children: One son and one daughter(Kalyani Gajapati)
- Education: Alagappa College of Technology
- Reign: 25 May 1974 CE - 10 January 2020 CE (titular)
- Predecessor: Krushna Chandra Gajapati
- Successor: Kalyani Gajapati
- House: Eastern Ganga dynasty (Paralakhemundi branch)

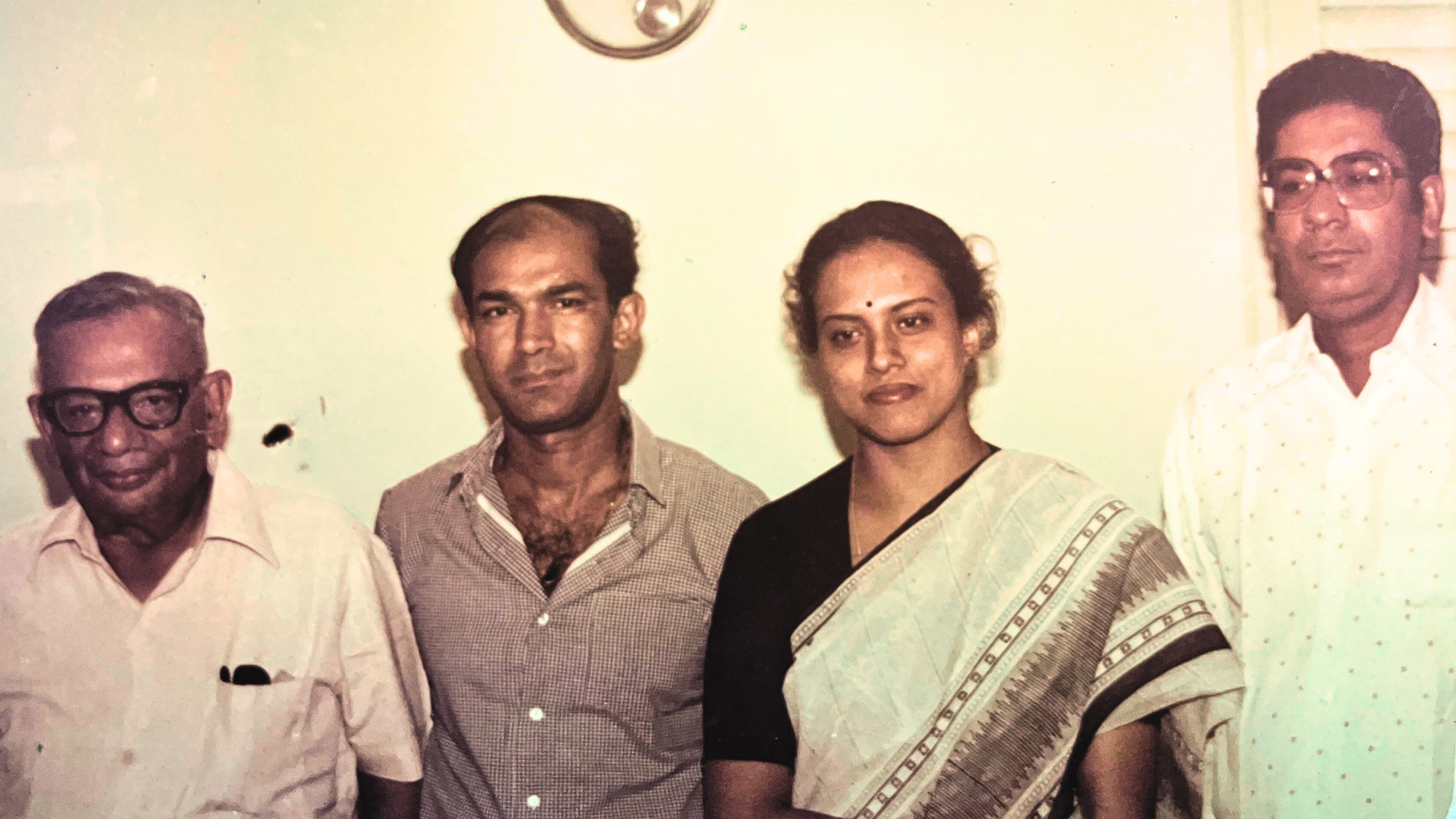
Photo of Madhav Sundar Gajapati Narayana Deo the younger brother of the first Prime Minister of Odisha(standing left), Prasanta Kishore Ray(grand son of the first Chief Justice of Odisha), Neeti Ray(grand daughter of Lal Mohan Patnaik) & Gopinath Gajapati(standing right) at Cuttack.

Gopinath Gajapati also known as Gopinath Gajapati Narayan Deo (6 March 1943 – 10 January 2020) was an Indian politician and a former titular head of the erstwhile princely state of Paralakhemundi having been crowned as King or Gajapati (a regnal title similar to Maharaja) on May 26, 1974. He was the grandson of Krushna Chadra Gajapati ruler of the princely state of Paralakhemundi who had played a pivotal role in the formation of Odisha state on a linguistic basis on April 1, 1936. Born to Rama Chandra Gajapati Narayan Deo. He was a member of the 9th and 10th Lok Sabha of India. He married Rani Purna Devi from the erstwhile princely family of Dharampur on 14 March 1967.

Impervious to factional or hyperlocal politics Gopinath succeeded twice having represented the Berhampur Lok Sabha constituency of Odisha and was a member of the Indian National Congress political party. He later joined BJP, and moved to Biju Janata Dal in 2009.

With a protracted legal battle with his brother Sarbajgan Jagannath Narayana Deo his later years were quite troubled due to alleged confinement and subsequent alienation by his head of staff and retinue at the Paralakhemundi Palace post the death(possibly suicide) of his son Digvijay in 2015 which caused him deep shock and grief further aggravating his frail health. Also he lost his brother Udayabhanu to suicide back in the 1950s.

Following which local loyal supporters, members of the civil society in Paralakhemundi, members of the local Jagannath temple along with Indian National Congress Odisha MLA K. Surya Rao and other political party functionaries resorted stroming the Palace to help evacuate Gopinath Gajapati and render medical aid to him in the process transferring him to Vishakapatnam and later on airlifted to Chennai. Later on a letter was written to then Chief Minister of Odisha Naveen Patnaik by Gopinath's daughter Kalyani urging him to inquire into the royal family's property transactions for the past 35 years. The district administration of Ganjam was also instrumental in redering aid to the ailing Gajapati.

On 10 January 2020, Gajapati died in a private hospital in Bhubaneswar at age 76.

He was a patron member of the Orissa Chemical Society.
