= Paralakhemundi Estate =

Zamindari estate in India

Parlakhemundi estate
- Zamindari
- 1309–1951
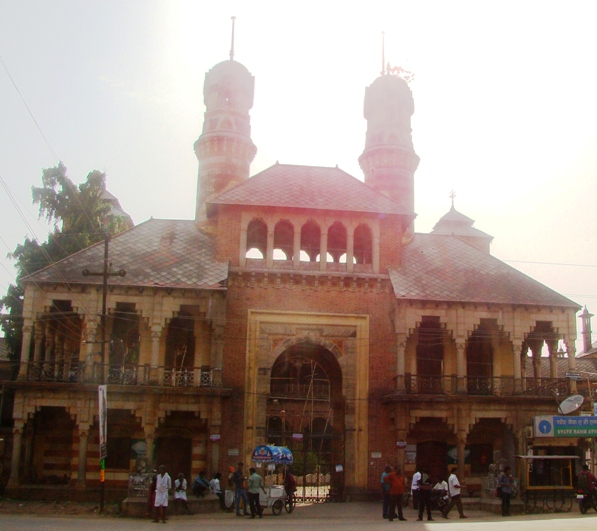
- Gajapati Palace, built by Great Grand father of Krushna Chandra Gajapati. It is the residence of the rulers of Parlakhemundi.

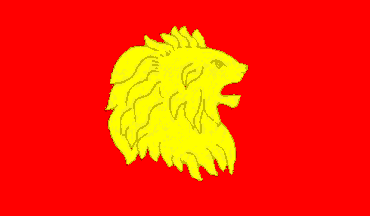
- Flag
- History
  - Established: 1309
  - Abolishment of Zamindari: 1951
Preceded by
Eastern Ganga dynasty
Gajapati Empire
Succeeded by
Badakhemundi Estate
Sanakhemundi Estate
India
- Today part of: India

Parlakhemundi Estate was a Zamindari estate in the Madras Presidency, India during the British era. Before the creation of the Orissa province, it was under the Madras Presidency. The state was ruled as an independent kingdom till 1769. The royal family belong to the Krushnatreya gotra Odia Kshatriya and traced their lineage to Eastern Ganga Dynasty. It was a zamindari estate lying in the southwestern portion of Ganjam district, covering an area of 615 square miles. It was bounded in the south by the district of Visakhapatnam and on the west by the Jeypore Estate and the tribal agencies of the Eastern Ghats.

The zamindars were a branch of the Eastern Ganga Dynasty that survived as the rulers of the Paralakhemundi estate, currently part of the Gajapati district, Odisha.

== History ==
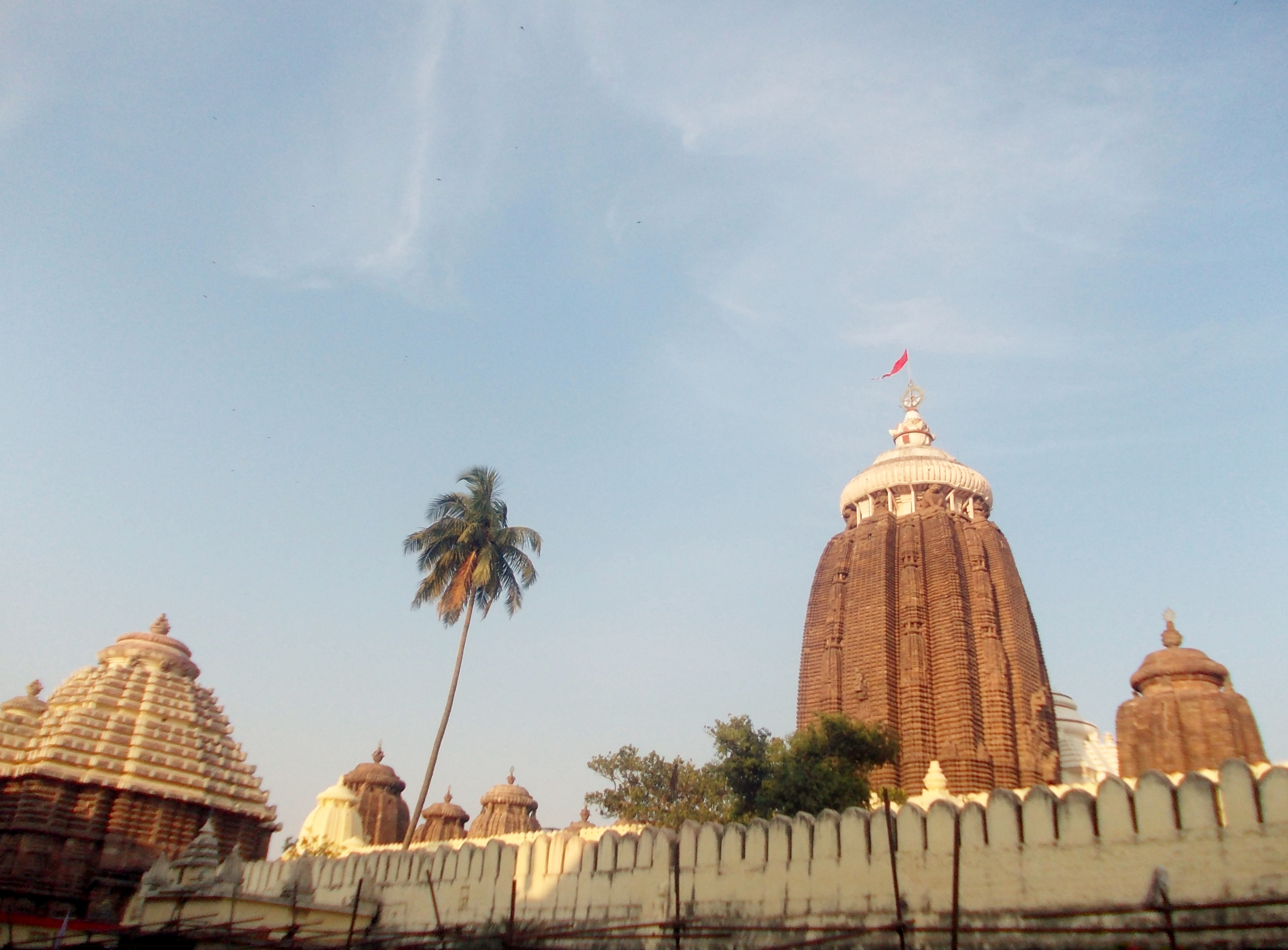
A panoramic view of Jagannath temple, Puri

The Khemundi kingdom was established by a branch of the Eastern Gangas before the reign of the Suryavamsa Gajapatis, who had ruled the Kalinga region with the dynasty chiefs calling themselves as Chandravamshis. This is traced to the foundation of the Khemundi kingdom by Narashingha Deba, a son of the Eastern Ganga monarch Bhanudeva II during the early 14th century. His descendants would inherit the Khemundi territory while the main Imperial Eastern Ganga line would end after being overthrown by the Suryavamshi Gajapati Empire. During the 16th cen, the Raja of Parlakhemundi, Subarnalinga Bhanu Deba granted parts of the Khimedi areas to his son Ananga Kesari Ramachandra Deba, whose son Chodanga Deba in turn divided the zamindari among his sons, splitting into two branches- Pedda Khimedi (Badakhemundi) and Chinna Khimedi (Sanakhemundi) in 1608. Two scions of the Bodokhemundi family were also instrumental in the foundation of the princely state of Hindol in 1554.

Parlakhemundi came under British influence in 1768. The Paralakhemundi zamindari state has played much of an important role in assembling the Odia speaking parts, propagating modern education system, building state infrastructures etc. A a large part of the estate now lies in Andhra Pradesh, even though the Gangas were based in Odisha.

The last king of Paralakhemundi, Maharaja Krushna Chandra Gajapati, played a key role in the Odisha state movement and is regarded as one of the architects of an independent united Odisha State and also went on to become the first Prime Minister of Orissa Province formed in 1936. The present-day Gajapati district of Odisha which was earlier a part of the historic Ganjam district was named after him.

== Rulers ==
The rulers of this line include:

=== Khemundi Kingdom ===
- Narasingha Deba (1309–1320)
- Madanrudra Deba (1320–1339)
- Narayana Rudra Deba (1339–1353)
- Ananda Rudra Deba (1353–1354)
- Ananda Rudra Deba (1354–1367)
- Jayarudra Deba (1367–1399)
- Lakhsmi Narasingha Deba (1399–1418)
- Madhukarna Gajapati (1418–1441)
- Murtunjaya Bhanu Deba (1441–1467)
- Madhaba Bhanu Deba (1467–1495)
- Chandra Betal Bhanu Deba (1495–1520)
- Subarnalinga Bhanu Deba (1520–1550)

=== Rulers of Paralakhemundi ===
Rulers of the Paralakhemundi state following the establishment of the Bodokhemundi and Sanakhemundi branches:

- Sibalinga Narayan Bhanudeo (1550–1568)
- Subarna Kesari Govinda Gajapati Narayan Deo (1568–1599)
- Mukunda Rudra Gajapati Narayan Deo (1599–1619)
- Mukunda Deo (1619–1638)
- Ananta Padmanabh Gajapati Narayan Deo I (1638–1648)
- Sarbajgan Jagannatha Gajapati Narayan Deo I (1648–1664)
- Narahari Narayan Deo (1664–1691)
- Bira Padmanabh Narayan Deo II (1691–1706)
- Prataprudra Gajapati Narayan Deo I (1706–1736)
- Jagannatha Gajapati Narayana Deo II (1736–1771)
- Goura Chandra Gajapati Narayan Deo I (1771–1803)
- Purushottam Gajapati Narayan Deo (1803–1806)
- Jagannath Gajapati Narayan Deo III (1806–1850)
- Prataprudra Gajapati Narayan Deo II (1850–1885)
- Goura Chandra Gajapati Narayan Deo II (1885–1904)
- Krushna Chandra Gajapati Narayan Deo (1913 – 25 May 1974)
- Gopinath Gajapati Narayan Deo (25 May 1974 – 10 January 2020)
- Kalyani Gajapati (10 January 2020–present)

== General references ==
- Patel, S.K. (1991). Cultural history of early medieval Orissa: Åšulki rule. Sundeep Prakashan. p. 48. ISBN 978-81-85067-71-1. Retrieved 2020-04-13.
