= Pingua =

- village
- Location within Odisha Location within India
- Coordinates: 20.8180°N 85.9445°E
- Country: India
- State: Odisha

Languages
  - Official: Odia, English
- Website: www.dhenkanal.nic.in

Pingua is a village in Dhenkanal district, Odisha, India, on the Bramhani River.
