= Ratnaprava Devi =

Indian politician and writer

- ରତ୍ନପ୍ରଭା ଦେବୀ

Member of the Odisha Legislative Assembly
- In office 1967–1971
- Constituency: Dhenkanal

Member of the Odisha Legislative Assembly
- In office 1961–1967
- Constituency: Dhenkanal

Member of the Odisha Legislative Assembly
- In office 1957–1961
- Constituency: Kishore Nagar

Personal details
- Born: 11 December 1909 Odisha, India
- Died: 27 April 2001 (aged 91)
- Party: Ganatantra Parishad; Swatantra Party
- Spouse: Shankar Pratap Singh Deo
- Children: Kamakhya Prasad Singh Deo
- Occupation: Politician, writer

Ratnaprava Devi (also spelled Ratnaprabha Devi; 11 December 1909 – 27 April 2001) was an Indian politician and writer from the state of Odisha. She served as a member of the Odisha Legislative Assembly for three terms, representing the Ganatantra Parishad and the Swatantra Party. She was also a member of the royal family of Dhenkanal State.

== Early life and background ==
Ratnaprava Devi was born on 11 December 1909. She was married to Raja Shankar Pratap Singh Deo, the ruler of the Dhenkanal State. Her son, Kamakhya Prasad Singh Deo, is a politician who served as a Union Minister and Member of Parliament in India.

== Political career ==
Devi was an active figure in Odia politics during the mid-20th century. She was elected to the Odisha Legislative Assembly three times:

- 1957: Elected from the Kishore Nagar constituency as a candidate of the Ganatantra Parishad.
- 1961: Elected from the Dhenkanal constituency as a candidate of the Swatantra Party.
- 1967: Re-elected from the Dhenkanal constituency representing the Swatantra Party.

== Literary works ==
Apart from politics, Ratnaprava Devi was a writer. She authored an autobiography detailing her life and experiences as a royal and a politician during India's transition to democracy.

- Autobiography of Queen Ratnaprava Devi (Originally published in Odia, 1997; Translated to English, 2021).

== See also ==
- Dhenkanal State
- Kamakhya Prasad Singh Deo
- Swatantra Party
