= Satyanarayana Rajguru =

Indian writer

Dr. Satyanarayana Rajguru
- Born: 19 August 1903; British India
- Died: 11 June 1997 (aged 93)
- Occupations: Epigraphist, writer, historian
- Known for: Studies in Odisha history
- Spouse: Taramani Devi
- Children: 4 son and 1 daughter
- Parent(s): Harikrushna Rajguru; Sunamani Devi
- Awards: Padma Shri; Sahitya Akademi Award; Odisha Sahitya Academy Award

Satyanarayana Rajguru (1903-1997) was an Indian litterateur, epigraphist and historian. He was a curator and epigraphist at the Odisha State Museum and was a recipient of Sahitya Akademi Award, Bharati Bhushan award, Ganjam Sahitya Sammilani award, Odisha Sahitya Academy Award and Sarala Sanman. The Government of India awarded him the fourth highest Indian civilian award of Padma Shri in 1974.

== Biography ==
Born on 19 August 1903 to Harikrushna Rajguru and Sunamani Devi in the Indian state of Odisha, Rajguru passed the Oriya and Sanskrit title examination from Andhra University and started his career in 1929 as the manager of Parala Padmanabha Rangalaya, the first theatre in Odisha, founded by Padmanabha Narayan Deo, erstwhile Raja of the state of Parala. During his tenure there, he was associated with the activities of Utkal Sammilani and assisted Krushna Chandra Gajapati in the formation of Odisha state in 1937; he is known to have submitted a thesis on the state reorganization.

Rajguru, after his tenure as the president of the Ganjam District Education Council (1942–45), worked as an assistant at the Kalinga Historical Research Society at Bhawanipatna from 1947 and later, joined Odisha State Museum to work as a curator (1950–61) and later as an epigraphist (1963–70). He was a member of the working committee of Odisha Sahitya Academy and the chairman of Paralakhemundi Municipality. He was a life member of Berhampur University and was awarded DLitt by the university.

Rajguru is known to have done notable research on the history of Odisha and is credited with findings on the early of life of Jayadeva, the thirteenth century Sanskrit poet and the author of Gita Govinda. He translated The Palanquin Bearers, a poem by Sarojini Naidu into Odia language under the name, Palinki Bahaka and has published several other works, some of which are prescribed text for university studies.

- Mo Jeevana Sangrama (autobiography)
- Swapane Chumban
- Janani Utkal
- Radhavisek
- Odia Lipira Krama Bikash
- History of Gangas
- The Korasanda Copper Plate Grant of Visakhavarmma
- History of Eastern Gangas of Kalinga
- Heirographic Letters of Naraj
- The Odras and their Predominency
- The Historical Research in Orissa
- The Konduli Copper Plate Grant of Narasimha Deva of Saka 1305
- Sumandal Plates of Dharmaraj
- Ranpur plates of Dharmaraja
- Historical Background of Gopinath & Radha Krishna
- Oriya Inscription on a Stone Image
- South Indian Inscriptions

Satyanarayana Rajguru died on 11 June 1997 at the age of 93, his wife Taramani Devi preceding him in death by one year. He is survived by his sons Gopeshwar Rajguru, Radha Raman Rajguru and Sitakant Rajguru.

== Honours, awards and recognition ==
Rajguru was awarded the civilian honour Padma Shri in 1974 by the Government of India. He received the Sahitya Akademi Award for his autobiography, Mo Jeevana Sangrama in 1996. He was also a recipient of Bharati Bhushan award from Andhra Mahasabha, Ganjam Sahitya Sammilani award (1968) and Odisha Sahitya Academy award (1968). He was a recipient of Sarala Sanman (1989) from Sarala Sansad.
