= Hindol, Odisha =

Coordinates: 20°36′N 85°12′E

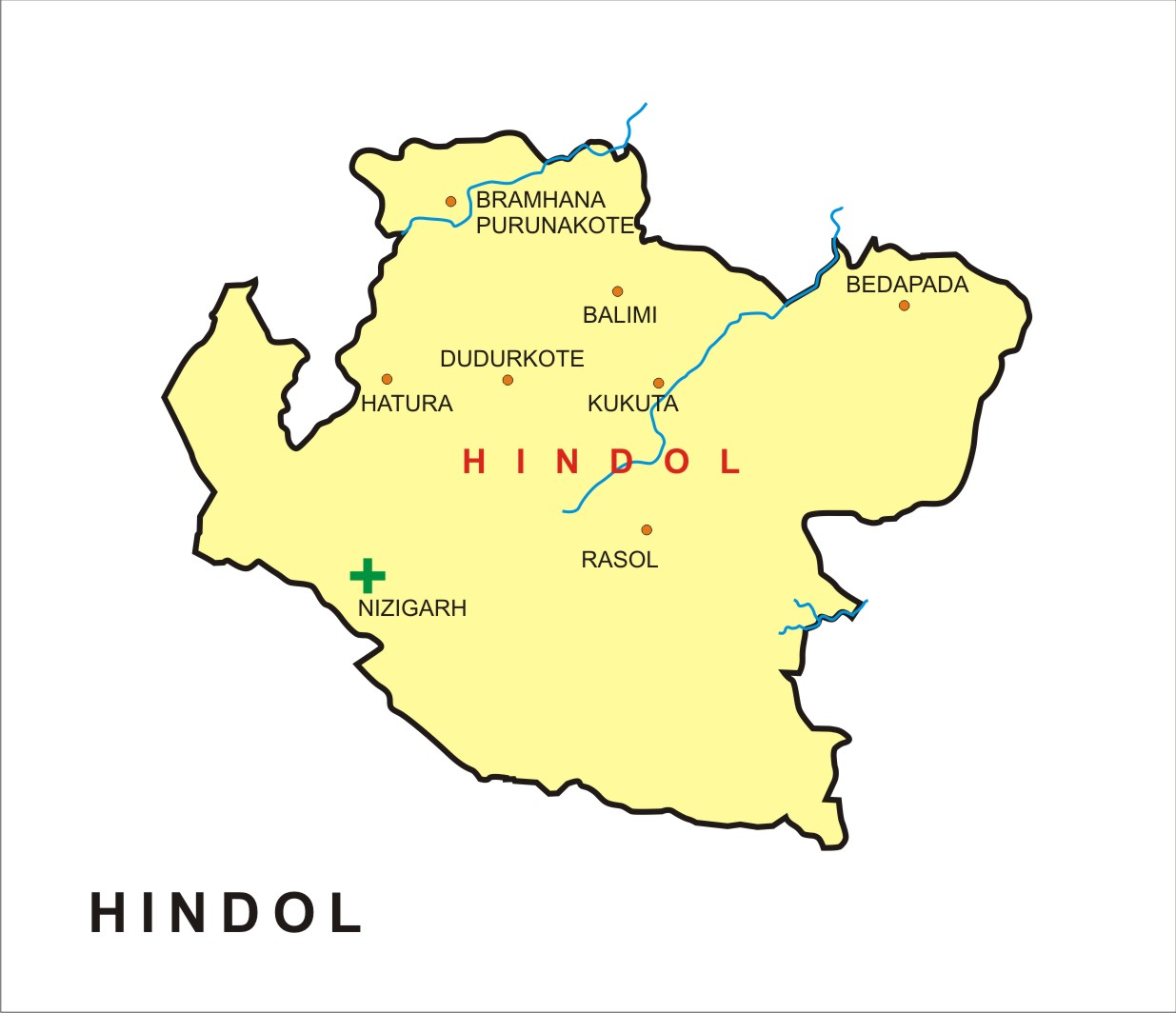
Hindol State established in 1554

Hindol is a town and subdivision in Dhenkanal district of the Indian state of Odisha.

== Geography ==
It is located 29 kilometres (18 mi) from NH 55 to Gudiakateni, 11 kilometres (6.8 mi) from NH 655 to Satamaili Chowk and is surrounded by reserve forest on the East, South, and West. It was a part of the Hindol princely state before independence. It is 60 kilometres (37 mi) from Dhenkanal.

== History ==
Hindol was founded from Dudurkote (established before 800 AD) in 1554 by two brothers named Lakshman Mahratta and Bharat Mahratta. They belonged to the family of the Khimedi Raja of Ganjam district, which also ruled over areas in the Madras region. After the East India Company occupied Odisha in September–October 1803, treaties were signed with estates of the region, including Hindol.

=== RULERS ===
Tenure	Name
1691–1701	Achyuta Singh Narendra
1701–1733	Bhagabat Singh Narendra
1733–1770	Damodar Singh Narendra
1770–1781	Radhakant Singh Mardraj Jagadeb
1781–1786	Ram Chandra Singh Mardraj Jagadeb
1786–1829	Kishan Chandra Mardraj Jagadeb
1829–1841	Harihar Singh Mardraj Jagadeb
1841–1874	Ishwar Singh Mardraj Jagadeb
1874–1877	Phokar Singh Mardraj Jagadeb
18 Jul 1877 – 10 Feb 1906	Janardan Mardraj Jagadeb (b. 1853 - d. ....)
10 Feb 1906 – 15 Aug 1947	Naba Kishor Chandra Mardraj Jagadeb (b. 1891 - d. 19...)

==== SARBARAKAR & ROYAL RESPONSIBILITIES ====
Tenure	Name & Details
800–1800	Father and Forehead grandfather of Satyabadi Pratap Singh Garnaik
1800–1840	" SATYABADI PRATAP SINGH GARNAIK "
1840–1875	Champettra Sardar Singh Garnaik son of Satyabadi Pratap Singh Garnaik
1875–1890	Ghasia Sardar Singh Garnaik son of Satyabadi Pratap Singh Garnaik
1890 - 1906	Madhu Sardar Singh Garnaik son of Satyabadi Pratap Singh Garnaik
1906–1938	Somanatha Satrujita Garnaik son of Champettra Sardar Singh Garnaik Sana Adhyaksh Senapati Nakula Samant Sinhar son of Ghasia Sardar Singh Garnaik
1938–1961	Sarbarakar Fakira Charan Garnaik son of Ghasia Sardar Singh Banamali Garnaik son of Ghasia Sardar Singh Ananta Garnaik son of Ghasia Sardar Singh Sadananda Garnaik son of Nakula Samant Sinhar Baikuntha Garnaik son of Sarbarakar Fakira Charan Garnaik Kedar Kishor Garnaik son of Sarbarakar Fakira Charan Garnaik

Hindol was the home to the Hindol princely state with the Odisha States Agency during the British Raj. After the East India Company occupied Odisha from September to October in 1803, treaties were signed with estates of the region, including Hindol. After Independence, the state merged into the Republic of India in 1947. Thereafter in 1948, when all the princely states including Dhenkanal, Talcher, Athmallik, Pal Lahara and Hindol formally merged with the province of Odisha, the present-day Dhenkanal district was created.

== Festivals ==
Hindol hosts five festivals every year, of which three are major. The most important of these is the Rath Yatra.

=== Harihat Mahotsav ===
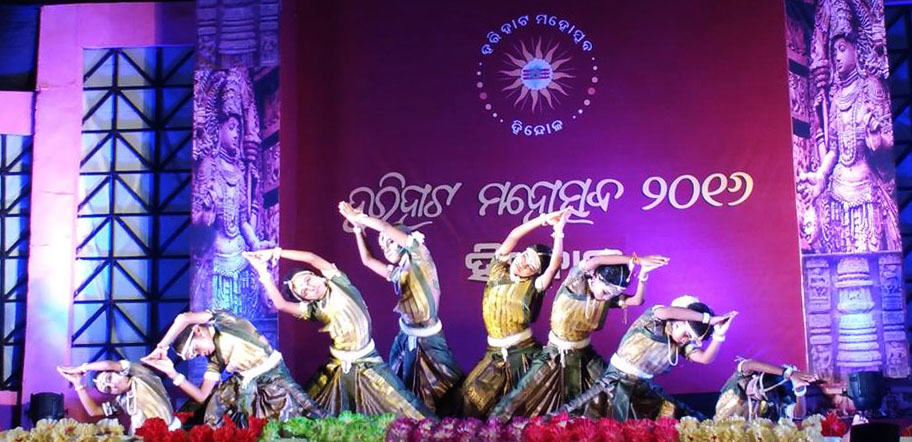

Harihat Mahotsav is the oldest carnival of Hindol. The original name Harihat Mela was converted to Harihat Mahotsav in 2016. But Harihat Mela was an ancient traditional carnival of Hindol that was started many years before the Twentieth Yatra.

==== Hindol Laxmi Puja Committee ====
Hindol Town 15 Laxmi Puja Committees.

- Radhakrushna Laxmi Puja Committee, Nutanpatana-C
- Bus Stand Laxmi Puja Committee, Amalapada
- Maudamani Laxmi Puja Committee, Post Office
- Medical Choka Laxmi Puja Committee
- Kalapana Bazar Laxmi Puja Committee, Nizigarhapatana
- Mera Bazar Laxmi Puja Committee
- Karigar Sahi Laxmi Puja Committee
- Satya Sahi Laxmi Puja Committee, Nutanpatana-A
- Gopala Sahi Laxmi Puja Committee, Nutanpatana-B
- Banamalipur Laxmi Puja Committee
- Pitabali Laxmi Puja Committee
- Gopalapur Laxmi Puja Committee-A
- Gopalapur Laxmi Puja Committee-B
- Radhanathapura Laxmi Puja Committee
- Champati Sahi Laxmi Puja Committee

== Politics ==
Hindol is a part of Hindol Assembly constituency and Dhenkanal Parliamentary constituency.

== Notable people ==
- Nakula Samanta Singhar - military commander to the feudal chief of Hindol
- Raja Bahadur Shailendra Narayan Singhdeo - Scion of the erstwhile Princely State of Hindol
- Nagendra Kumar Pradhan - Indian Politician and former Odisha State Cabinet Minister
- Shridhar Swami (Mukunda Das) - Founder of the Mahima Alekh cult aka Mahima Dharma
