= Karamul =

Coordinates: 20.565733°N 85.218002°E

Karamul was the ancient capital of Dhenkanal. The kingdom was later renamed Dhenkanal and the capital was moved to Dhenkapidha.
