= Rajathgarh Junction railway station =

Railway station in Odisha, India

Rajathgarh Junction

General information
- Location: Rajathgarh, Rahangol, Cuttack district, Odisha; India
- Coordinates: 20°34′34″N 85°44′30″E
- Elevation: 59 metres (194 ft)
- System: Indian Railways station
- Owner: Indian Railways
- Line: Cuttack–Sambalpur line
- Platforms: 2
- Tracks: 2

Construction
- Structure type: Standard (on ground)
- Parking: Yes

Other information
- Status: Functioning
- Station code: RJGR
- Zone(s): East Coast Railway
- Division(s): Khurda Road

History
- Opened: 1998

Services
Preceding station	Indian Railways	Following station
Joranda Road towards ?	East Coast Railway zone Cuttack–Sambalpur line	Radhakishorepur towards ?
Terminus	East Coast Railway zone Howrah–Chennai main line	Machapur towards ?
Location
- Location within India Location within Odisha

Rajathgarh Junction railway station is a railway junction station on Cuttack–Sambalpur line under the Khurda Road railway division of the East Coast Railway zone. The railway station is situated at Rajathgarh, Rahangol in Cuttack district of the Indian state of Odisha.
