= Makuakateni =

Village in India

Coordinates: 20.969677°N 85.642245°E

Makuakateni is a village in the Dhenkanal district of Odisha state in India.
