= Tathagata Satpathy =

Indian politician

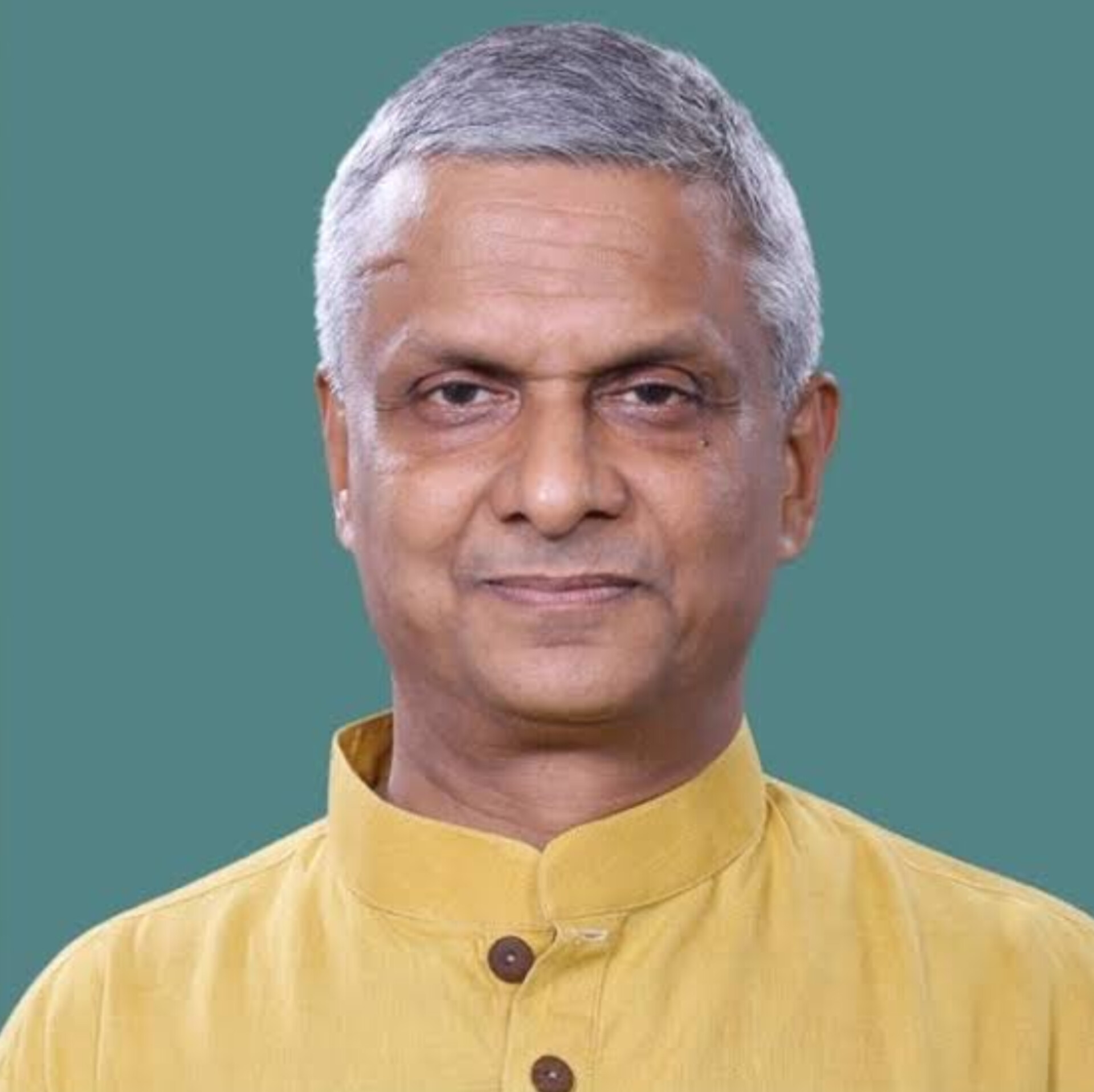
- File Photo Of Tathagata Satapathy 2014.

Member of Parliament, Lok Sabha
- In office 2004–2019
- Preceded by: Kamakhya Prasad Singh Deo
- Succeeded by: Mahesh Sahoo
- In office 1998–1999
- Preceded by: Kamakhya Prasad Singh Deo
- Succeeded by: Kamakhya Prasad Singh Deo
- Constituency: Dhenkanal

Personal details
- Born: 1 April 1956 (age 70) Cuttack, Odisha, India
- Citizenship: India
- Party: BJD
- Spouse: Adyasha Satpathy
- Children: Aaryl Che Satpathy- Son, Aavya Nandini Satpathy- Daughter
- Website: https://tathagatasatpathy.com/site

Tathagata Satpathy (born 1 April 1956) was a member of the 12th, 14th, 15th and 16th Lok Sabha of India. He represented the Dhenkanal constituency of Odisha, and was re-elected for the fourth time in 2014. He was a member of the Biju Janata Dal (BJD) political party, and the party's chief whip in the Lok Sabha. He took voluntary retirement from politics in March 2019. He is not an active politician ever since.

== Life and work ==
Tathagata Satpathy is the second son of former Odisha Chief Minister Nandini Satpathy and Devendra Satpathy. He is the owner and editor of the daily Odia newspaper, Dharitri, and the English daily, Orissa Post.

Tathagata educated at St. Columba's School in New Delhi and Sri Aurobindo International Centre of Education, Pondicherry, he has studied Philosophy, English and French. He had done his mother language, Oriya, by self study.

Tathagata entered active politics in the mid 70s as a teenager opposing the Emergency clamped by the Indian National Congress (INC).

While both his parents were long time Congress members, Tathagata has been opposed to that political party since before his career in electoral politics began early.

He joined active politics in the late 1980s when Sri Biju Patnaik took him into the Janata Party and he got elected to the Odisha Legislative Assembly and became an MLA in 1990. While his party kept changing its name from Janata Party to Janata Dal and later Biju Janata Dal, but he never changed his party.

He went on to become a Four term Member of Parliament till 2019 by winning the Dhenkanal-Angul Lok Sabha seat in 1998, 2004, 2009 and 2014 general elections.

His nephew Suparno Satpathy had unsuccessfully contested him in 2014 for the office of MP Lok Sabha, Dhenkanal.

In March 2015, Tathagata Satpathy became the first Indian Member of Parliament to hold an official "Ask Me Anything" session on the content-sharing website Reddit. In April, Satpathy came forward in support of net neutrality, after the Telecom Regulatory Authority of India (TRAI) come out with a consultation paper on over-the-top (OTT) messaging services. In December 2015, Satpathy had supported a bill to decriminalise homosexuality. The bill was introduced by INC leader Shashi Tharoor. But, it was defeated with 71 against, 1 abstaining and 24 in favour.

== Views and opinions ==
=== On net neutrality ===
In March 2014, the Telecom Regulatory Authority of India (TRAI) released a formal consultation paper on over-the-top (OTT) messaging services and whether telecom operators should be allowed to charge separately for some messaging apps. Soon afterwards, Tathagata Satpathy wrote an open letter to TRAI stating his support for net neutrality. In the letter, he said such a policy would hinder the Digital India project and kill new startups. He said that he used such apps to interact with his constituency and this policy will hinder his functioning as a representative.

=== On legalisation of cannabis ===
Tathagata Satpathy has criticised the ban on cannabis in India, while pointing out the long history of its usage as a ritual and recreational intoxicant. He has said that cannabis was banned in India while alcohol was not, because of "an elitist bias" as cannabis was a poor man's drug. He has said the addiction depends on person's character and not on the intoxicant. He has suggested an amendment to the Narcotic Drugs and Psychotropic Substances Act, 1985 to allow recreational and medicinal usage of marijuana. During his "Ask Me Anything" session on Reddit in March 2015, Satpathy admitted that he smoked cannabis when he was young. In August 2015, during the monsoon session of the Parliament, he proposed the decriminalisation of cannabis. In December 2015, he repeated his proposal during the winter session, saying that banning cannabis has forced villagers to turn to alcohol.

=== On homosexuality and moral policing ===
Tathagata Satpathy has condemned the Section 377 of the Indian Penal Code, which criminalises homosexuality in India, calling it "archaic" and called for its repeal. He had supported a bill introduced by INC MP Shashi Tharoor to decriminalise homosexuality during the 2015 winter session of the Parliament. When the bill was defeated, Satpathy called it a very sad day. Satpathy has also condemned moral policing and called for a repeal of laws banning pornography in India.

=== On privacy and Aadhaar ===
Tathagata Satpathy has raised concerns that the Aadhaar project could be used for mass surveillance or ethnic cleansing in the future. He has questioned why a new identity card project was created despite having several identity cards systems. He has also criticised the decision to present the Aadhaar Bill, 2016 as a money bill. He pointed out that although the bill allows the sharing of biometric under circumstances of national security, there was no concrete definition of national security included in the bill.

=== On religious laws and missionaries ===
Satpathy supports the implementation of a Uniform Civil Code in India. He has criticised those current laws which are based on various religions, saying that the world is moving beyond religious scriptures and such laws only divide the society. He has also said that a lot of faith-based foreign aid comes to Odisha through missionaries. They offer the poor Dalits free education and jobs, this results in mass conversions to Christianity. Satpathy has said that politicians should use the dictionary definition of secularism to avoid confusion.

=== Other opinions ===
Satpathy has supported the inclusion of Members of Parliament under the Jan Lokpal Bill to curb corruption. In December 2015, he criticised the Arbitration and Conciliation (Amendment) Bill, 2015 during a debate, saying that the government was favouring big corporations with such laws. He has also criticised the Sansad Adarsh Gram Yojana calling it flawed and that it looks good only on paper. He said it forces him to choose only 8 villages from his constituency for development out of 3000. Satpathy has opposed the proposal to make Hindi the national language.

Satpathy has criticised the construction of new nuclear power plants in India, claiming that most of the world was now moving away from nuclear energy. He has also claimed that Areva nuclear firm of France sold outdated technology to Maharashtra. He has also said that the centre should release the data regarding the safety of nuclear power plants as they are in other countries.

== Personal life ==
Satpathy is married to Adyasha Satpathy who works as the CEO of Dharitri and OrissaPOST. They have a son and a daughter.

== See also ==
- Biju Janata Dal
- Net neutrality in India
- Section 377 of the Indian Penal Code
