= Badakhemundi Estate =

Badakhemundi estate
- Zamindari of British India
- 1550–1947
- History
  - Established: 1550
  - Independence of India: 1947
| Preceded by | Succeeded by |
| Paralakhemundi Estate | India |
- Today part of: India

Badakhemundi estate, also known as Pedda Khimedi estate, was a zamindari in the Ganjam district in the British period of Eastern Ganga dynasty. It was an offshoot of Parlakhemundi branch of Ganga dynasty. It had an area of 505 km^{2} and a population of 40,650 inhabitants (1871) in 194 villages.

== History ==
The Khemundi kingdom, consisting of Parlakhemundi, Badakhemundi and Sanakhemundi, was under a single ruler until 1550, following which the Raja of Parlakhemundi, Subarnalinga Bhanu Deba granted parts of the Khemundi areas to his son Ananga Kesari Ramachandra Deba, whose son Chodanga Deba in turn divided the zamindari among his sons, splitting into two branches, with his eldest son Narasingha Deba inheriting Badakhemundi and the younger son Biswanath Deba inheriting Sanakhemundi in 1608.

Two scions, Chandradeva Jenamani and Udhavadeva Jenamani of the Badakhemundi family were also instrumental in the foundation of the princely state of Hindol in 1554.

Bodhchandra Singh, the last raja of the Manipur kingdom, married Rajkumari Ram Priya Devi, the daughter of a raja of Badakhemundi. She became HH Srimati Maharani Tharendra Kishori on her marriage, and died in 1942.
