= Dhenkanal College =

College in Odisha, India

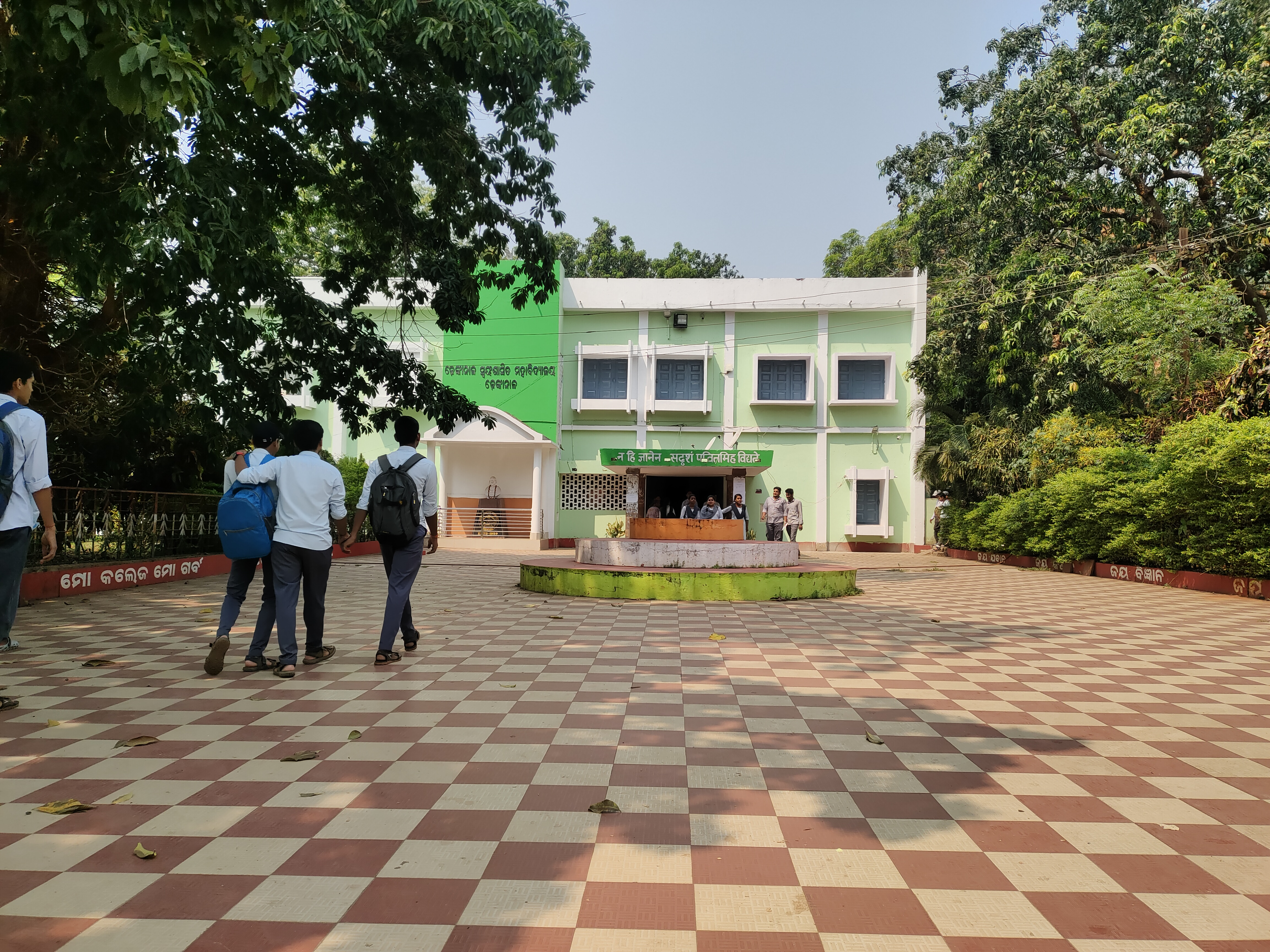
- Type: Autonomous
- Established: 1959
- Affiliation: Utkal University
- Principal: Chitta Ranjan Sahoo
- Location: Dhenkanal, Odisha, India; 20.641469°N 85.614968°E
- Campus: Urban, 55 acres (0.22 km^{2})
- Website: dhenkanalcollege.ac.in

Dhenkanal College, officially Dhenkanal Autonomous College, is an autonomous college located at Dhenkanal, Odisha, India. It Provides undergraduate and post-graduate programs in commerce, sciences and liberal arts. It is affiliated to Utkal University, a public sector higher education institution in Bhubaneshwar.

== History ==
Dhenkanal Autonomous College was established in 1959 and was granted autonomous status in 2002. After the UGC facing the possible loss of autonomy in 2019, the UGC granted the institute an extension of the status until 2023.
