= Nandini Satpathy =

Indian politician (1931–2006)

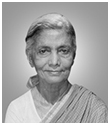

8th Chief Minister of Odisha
- In office 6 March 1973 – 16 December 1976
- Preceded by: President's rule
- Succeeded by: President's rule
- In office 14 June 1972 – 3 March 1973
- Preceded by: Bishwanath Das
- Succeeded by: President's rule

Personal details
- Born: 9 June 1931 Cuttack, Bihar and Orissa Province, British India
- Died: 4 August 2006 (aged 75) Bhubaneswar, Odisha, India
- Party: Indian National Congress
- Spouse: Devendra Satpathy
- Children: 2 including Tathagata Satpathy
- Website: http://www.snsmt.org

Nandini Satpathy (9 June 1931 – 4 August 2006) was an Indian politician and author. She was the Chief Minister of Odisha from June 1972 to December 1976.

== Early life ==
Nandini Satpathy was born on 9 June 1931 as Nandini Panigrahi to Kalindi Charan Panigrahi and Ratnamani Panigrahi in a Brahmin Family of Coastal Puri but grew up in Pithapur, Cuttack, India. Satpathy's uncle Bhagavati Charan Panigrahi founded the Odisha branch of the Communist Party of India. She was a close associate of Netaji Subhash Chandra Bose.

== Political career ==
In 1939, at the age of eight, she was mercilessly beaten up by British Police for pulling down the Union Jack and for pasting hand written anti-British Raj posters on the walls of Cuttack. The same was widely discussed at that time and it had worked as pouring fuel on fire for the struggle of Freedom of India from British Raj.

While at Ravenshaw College pursuing her Master of Arts in Odia, she got involved with the Communist Party's student wing, the Student Federation. In 1951, a student protest movement began in Odisha against rising college education costs, it later turned into a national youth movement. Nandini was a leader of this movement. The police force attacked the protestors and Nandini Satpathy was severely injured in the same. She was jailed, along with many others. In the jail she met Devendra Satpathy, another Student Federation member and the man who she later married.

In 1962, the Congress party was dominant in Orissa; the Orissa State Legislative Assembly of 140 members had over 80 from the Congress party. At a national level, there was a movement to have more women representatives in the Indian Parliament. The Assembly elected Nandini Satpathy (then president of the Women's Forum) to the upper house of India's Parliament, where she served two terms. After Indira Gandhi became Prime Minister of India in 1966, Satpathy became a Minister attached to the Prime Minister, with her specific portfolio being the Ministry of Information and Broadcasting.

Satpathy returned to Odisha in 1972, due to vacancies caused by Biju Patnaik and others departing from the Congress party, and became the Chief Minister of Odisha. During the Emergency of 25 June 1975 – 21 March 1977, she imprisoned a number of notable individuals, including Nabakrusna Choudhuri and Rama Devi; however, Odisha had the fewest prominent individuals jailed during the Emergency, and Satpathy otherwise attempted to resist Indira Gandhi's policies during the Emergency. Satpathy left office in December 1976. During the general election in 1977, she was part of a group of protesters led by Jagjivan Ram, which became the Congress for Democracy (CFD) party. CFD merged with Janata Party in May 1977. Nandini Satpathy was elected to Orissa Vidhan Sabha from Dhenkanal in June 1977. In 1980, she won that seat as Congress (Urs) candidate, and in 1985 as an independent. In 1990, her son Tathagata Satpathy won Dhenkanal assembly seat as Janata Dal candidate.

Nandini Satpathy returned to the Congress party in 1989, on the request of Rajiv Gandhi. The Congress party was unpopular in Odisha as a whole, due to its two term misrule (primarily under Janaki Ballabh Patnaik as Chief Minister). She was elected as a member of the State Legislative Assembly from Gondia, Dhenkanal and remained in the Assembly until 2000, when she decided to retire from politics; she did not contest the 2000 elections. She was not influential in and was critical of the Odisha branch of the Congress party.

=== Court Case ===
In 1977, Satpathy was accused of corruption and a police investigation started into possible violations of the Prevention of Corruption Act in force at that time. During the investigation, she was interrogated on a number of questions in written form. She refused to answer any questions; her attorney argued that Article 20 (3) of the Indian Constitution protected her against forced self-incrimination. The court agreed, strengthening the rights of the accused with a recognition of the right to a lawyer and the right against self-incrimination; it moreover held that women have the right to be questioned at their homes in the presence of male relatives, have the right to be brought to the police station only after a formal arrest, and have the right to be searched only by other women. Over the next 18 years, Satpathy won all of the cases against her.

== Literary career ==
Satpathy was a writer in the Odia language; her work has been translated and published into a number of other languages. She received the 1998 Sahitya Bharati Samman Award for her contributions to Odia literature. Her last major literary work was translating Taslima Nasreen's Lajja into Odia.

== Death ==
She died on 4 August 2006 at her home in Bhubaneswar.

== Srimati Nandini Satpathy Memorial Trust (SNSMT) ==
In 2006 a social cause organisation, the Srimati Nandini Satpathy Memorial Trust (SNSMT), was established in her memory. It is one of the leading social cause organisations of Odisha albeit India. Suparno Satpathy heads SNSMT as Chairman.

== Family ==
Her younger out of the two sons Tathagata Satpathy is a 4 time Member of Parliament from Biju Janata Dal and the editor of daily newspapers — Dharitri and OrissaPOST.

Her eldest grandson Suparno Satpathy is a noted socio-political leader, Chairman SNSMT and Cidevant Convenor PMSA-Odisha, Govt. of India.

== Legacy ==
9 June, the birthday of late Nandini Satpathy, has been declared as National Daughters' Day – Nandini Diwas. Nandini and Diwas are two Sanskrit words which means daughter and day, respectively.

1st National Daughters day (Nandini Diwas) was celebrated in 2007 and Governor of Odisha was the chief guest in the event.

7th National Daughters day (Nandini Diwas) was celebrated in 2013 and Governor of Rajasthan was the Chief guest in the event.

Political offices
Preceded by Bishwanath Das (1st term)	Chief Minister of Odisha; 14 June 1972 to 3 March 1973 (1st term); 6 March 1973 to 16 December 1976 (2nd term)	Succeeded by Binayak Acharya (2nd term)
