= Krushna Chandra Gajapati =

Key figure in the formation of Odisha state in India

Captain Maharaja Krushna Chandra Gajapati Narayana Deva KCIE
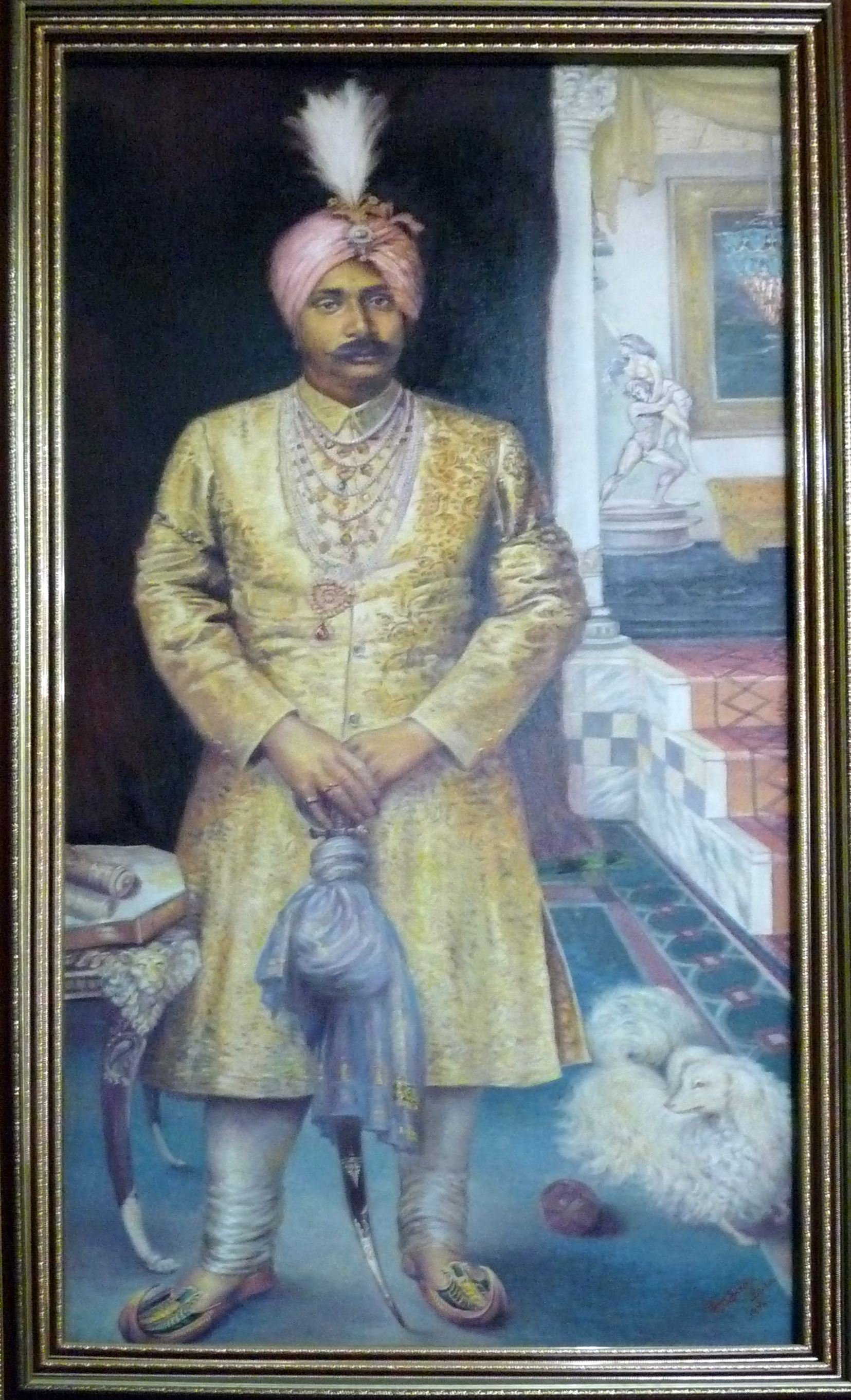
- Painting of Maharaja Krushna Chandra Gajapati Narayana Deba

Prime Minister of Odisha
- In office 29 November 1941 – 29 June 1944
- Preceded by: Bishwanath Das
- Succeeded by: Harekrushna Mahatab
- In office 1 April 1937 – 19 July 1937
- Preceded by: Post created
- Succeeded by: Bishwanath Das

Personal details
- Born: 26 April 1892 Paralakhemundi, Madras Presidency, British India
- Died: 25 May 1974 (aged 82) Paralakhemundi, Orissa, India
- Spouse(s): Maharani Naleeni Pattamahadevi, princess of Kharsawan State
- Children: 3
- Parent(s): Goura Chandra Gajapati Narayan Dev; Radhamani Devi
- Education: Newington College, Madras
- Reign: 1913 CE – 1947 CE; 1947 CE – 1974 CE (titular)
- Predecessor: Goura Chandra Gajapati Narayan Deo II
- Successor: Ramachandra Gajapati Narayan Deo
- House: Eastern Ganga dynasty (Paralakhemundi branch)

Krushna Chandra Gajapati KCIE (26 April 1892 – 25 May 1974), also known as Captain Maharaja Sri Sri Sri Krushna Chandra Gajapati Narayana Deva KCIE, was one of the key figures in the creation of the Indian state of Odisha. He was a scion of Paralakhemundi Estate (then Ganjam district of Odisha and Srikakulam taluk of Andhrapradesh) and the owner of Delanga estate of Puri district of Odisha. His family belonged to the great Eastern Ganga Dynasty. He was the first Prime Minister of Odisha. The present-day Gajapati District of Odisha was named after him.

== Early life and education ==
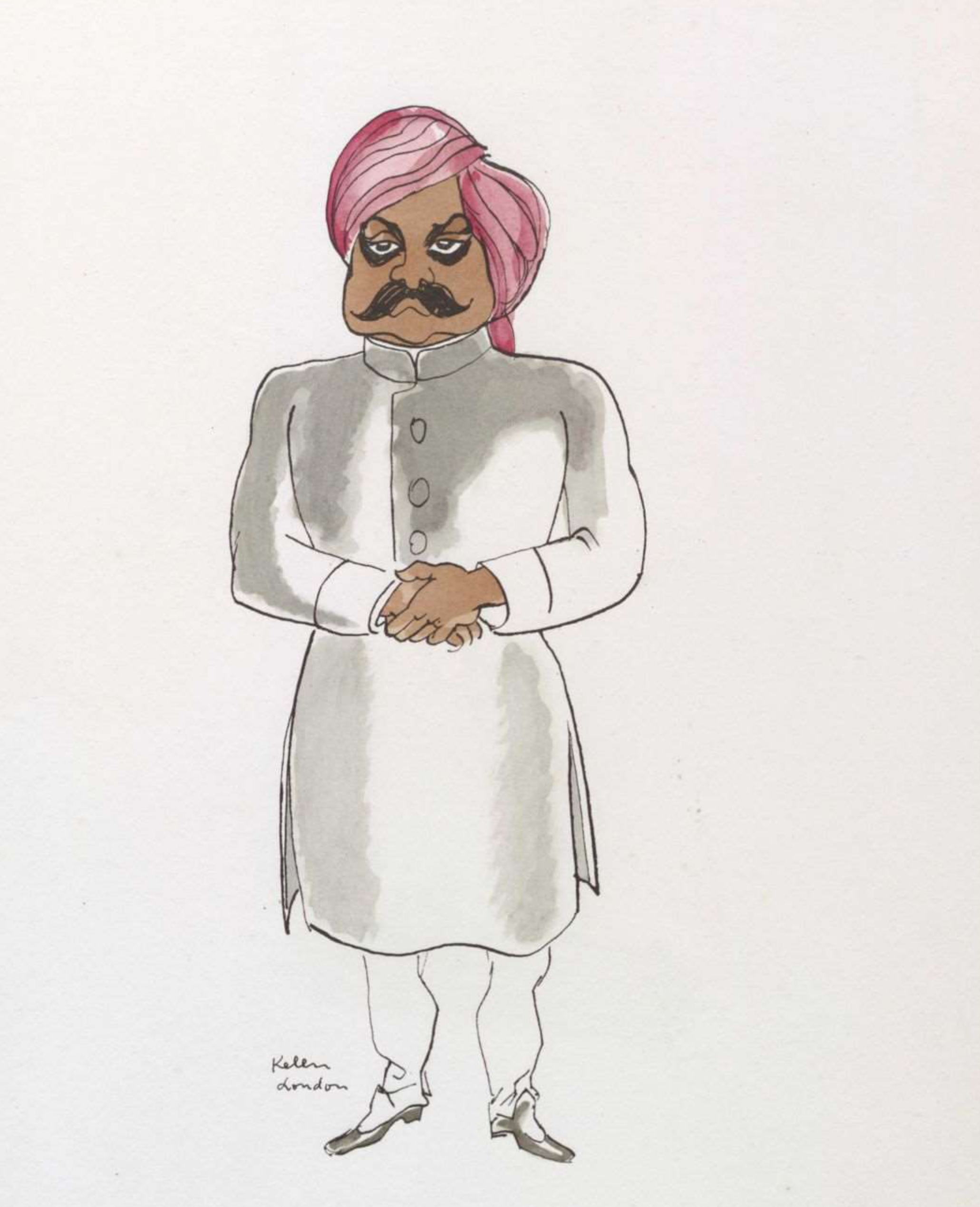
Caricature of Krushna Chandra Gajapati by Emery Kelen

Krushna Chandra was born on 26 April 1892 to the Zamindar of Paralakhemundi, Goura Chandra Gajapati and his wife Radhamani Devi.

He received his elementary education at the local Maharaja High School of Paralakhemundi and then went to Newington College in Madras for higher studies. During his studies in Madras, he lost his father. After the completion of his education he returned to Paralakhemundi and in the year 1913 married the princess of Kharsawan State. In the same year he succeeded as the next zamindar of his estate on 26 April 1913.

== Role in the formation of Independent Odisha State ==
Maharaja Krushna Chandra Gajapati, Utkal Gourav Madhusudan Das, Utkalamani Gopabandhu Das, Fakir Mohan Senapati and other eminent members of Utkal Sammilani demanded a separate Odisha state with an amalgamation of Odia speaking areas in the then Odisha-Bihar-Bengal province.

Finally, with the efforts of this Utkal Sammilani, the separate state of Odisha was formed on 1 April 1936. From that day, 1 April is celebrated by the Odia people as Utkal Divas. His estate in Vizagapatam district was partitioned into two – with the capital and major parts coming under Odisha whereas the remaining Telugu-majority areas remained in the Madras Presidency. In 1937, the first Governor of Odisha, Sir John Austin Hubback invited Krushna Chandra to form the cabinet. He became the first Prime Minister of Odisha from 1 April 1937 to 18 July 1937, elected again for the second time from 24 November 1941 to 30 June 1944.

== Social and philanthropic services ==
He was instrumental in the establishment of the Utkal University, the SCB Medical College, the famous Central Rice Research Institute in Bidyadharpur, Cuttack and later MKCG Medical College & Hospital in Berhampur. He set up many hospitals, schools, colleges, industrial institutions, modern agricultural farms and provided a record number of 1281 irrigation sagars or water-tanks in his agriculturally dominant native taluk. For this reason, the undivided Ganjam District was given the title 'the rice-bowl of Odisha'. Under Gajapati, scholarships were awarded to thousands of poor and meritorious students in humanities, science, agriculture, medicine, and engineering, among others.

Apart from these, Maharaja was a well-known patron of the arts and research scholars in various fields. He supported the historical research of Padmasri Dr. Satyanarayana Rajguru and the production of gramophone records of the renowned Odishi musician Gayaka Siromani Apanna Panigrahi, who was his court musician (rajasangitagya) as well as a friend. He was devoted towards ancient poets, especially Kabi Kalahansa Gopalakrusna of Paralakhemundi. Maharaja was himself an expert in ancient Odishi music and literature and has a number of original compositions to his credit, such as 'Manu Jau Nahi Ma', 'Radhadhara Sumadhura' and others.

== Political services and honours ==
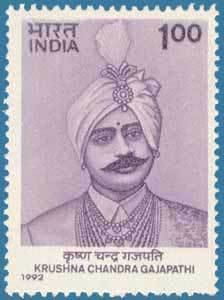
Krushna Chandra Gajapati on indian Postage stamp, 1992

Krushna Chandra served as a Captain in the First World War. He received a rare Sanad in 1920 from the then Viceroy and Governor General of India, in recognition of his services rendered to the Indian Army during the Great War and as a mark of commendation. He was a Member of the Royal Commission on Agriculture, under the Chairmanship of Lord Linlithgow. He was also a Member of the Madras Legislative Council.

He was awarded honorary Doctorates by the Utkal University and the Berhampur University, and was appointed a Knight Commander of the Order of the Indian Empire (KCIE) in the 1946 New Year Honours.

Krushna Chandra died on 25 May 1974 at the age of 82. He was accorded a state funeral by the Government of Odisha and was cremated with full honours at Paralakhemundi.

| Preceded by Post created Bishwanath Das (2nd term) | Prime Minister of Odisha; 1 April 1937 to 19 July 1937 (1st term); 29 November 1941 to 29 June 1944 (2nd term) | Succeeded by Bishwanath Das (1st term); Harekrushna Mahatab (2nd term) |
