= Dhirapatana =

Coordinates: 20.524887°N 85.582386°E

Dhirapatana is a village in the state of Orissa on the east coast of India.

Its population is around 1500 which is Panchayat head office Dhirapata Gram panchayat.

Many people work in nature. There are also doctors, software engineers, civil engineers, teachers, and bankers.
