= Dharitri (newspaper) =

Daily Odia Newspaper

- Type: Daily newspaper
- Format: Print, Digital
- Owner(s): Navajat Printers & Media Pvt. Ltd.
- Founder(s): Kalindi Charan Panigrahi and Ramnath Panda
- Publisher: Tathagata Satpathy
- Editor: Tathagata Satpathy
- Founded: November 24, 1974; 51 years ago
- Language: Odia
- Headquarters: Bhubaneswar
- Country: India
- Circulation: 455842
- Sister newspapers: OrissaPOST
- Website: www.dharitri.com
- Free online archives: dharitriepaper.in

Orissa Post

- Founded: 2011; 14 years ago by Dharitri (newspaper) group
- Language: English
- City: Bhubaneswar, Sambalpur, Angul, Rayagada
- Country: India
- Website: www.orissapost.com
- Free online archives: odishapostepaper.com

Dharitri (ଧରିତ୍ରୀ) (lit. transl. The Earth) is an Indian daily newspaper published in the Odia language from the capital city of Bhubaneswar. The newspaper was founded on 24 November 1974 by the Samajbadi Society in Bhubaneswar.

== Orissa Post ==
Orissa Post is an Indian English-language daily newspaper started by Dharitri Group in 2011. It is published from Bhubaneswar, Sambalpur, Angul, Rayagada in Odisha. The editor of the newspaper is Tathagata Satpathy.
