= Dhenkanal district =

- District
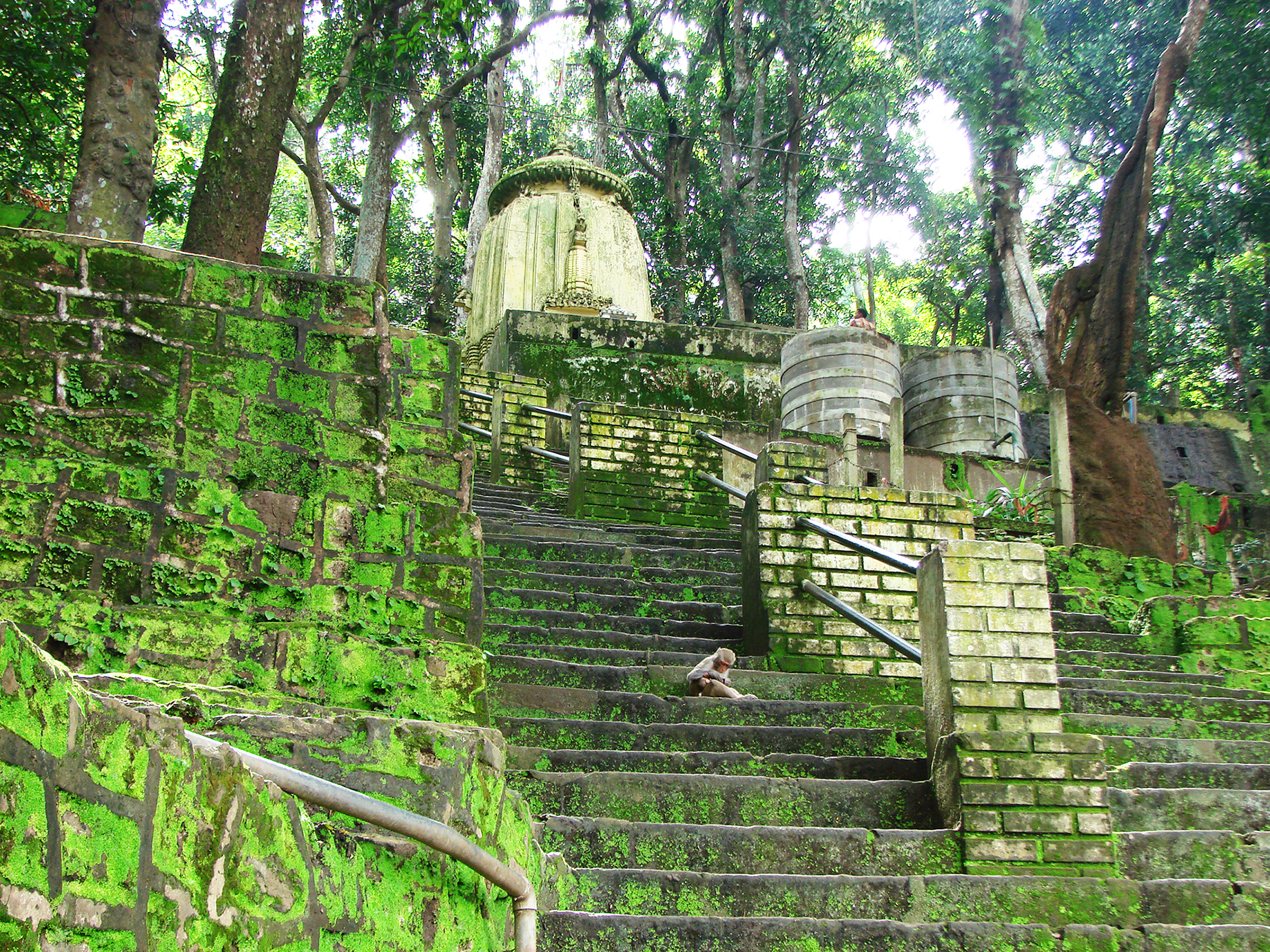
- Top: Kapilash Temple; Bottom: Anantashayana Vishnu in Saranga
- Interactive map of Dhenkanal district
- Coordinates: 20.65°N 85.6°E
- Country: India
- State: Odisha
- Headquarters: Dhenkanal

Area
  - Total: 4,452 km^{2} (1,719 sq mi)

Population (2011)
  - Total: 1,192,811
  - Rank: 18
  - Density: 267.9/km^{2} (693.9/sq mi)

Languages
  - Official: Odia, English
- Time zone: UTC+5:30 (IST)
- PIN: 759 xxx
- Telephone code: 6762
- Vehicle registration: OR-06 / OD-06
- Sex ratio: 947 ♂/♀
- Literacy: 79.41%
- Lok Sabha constituency: Dhenkanal
- Vidhan Sabha constituency: 7: Angul Dhenkanal Hindol Talcher Parjang Palahada Kamakshyanagar
- Climate: Aw (Köppen)
- Precipitation: 1,421 millimetres (55.9 in)
- Website: www.dhenkanal.nic.in

Dhenkanal district is one of the 30 districts of the state of Odisha in Eastern India. The district headquarters is Dhenkanal.

== Geography ==
Dhenkanal district is one of the centrally located districts in Odisha. It lies between Longitude: 85° 58' to 86° 2' East and Latitude: 20° 29' to 21° 11' North. The nearest airport, Biju Patnaik Airport in Bhubaneshwar, is 52.12 Km away. It is bordered by Kendujhar and Angul districts to the north, Jajpur district to the east, Cuttack district to the south and Angul district to the west.

The district comprises mainly plains, however there are several discontinuous hill ranges in the district along its southern border. The Brahmani River is the main river of the district.

== Demographics ==
Historical population
Year	Pop.	±% p.a.
1901	292,497	—
1911	302,120	+0.32%
1921	263,405	−1.36%
1931	324,991	+2.12%
1941	379,327	+1.56%
1951	429,097	+1.24%
1961	526,520	+2.07%
1971	665,377	+2.37%
1981	797,053	+1.82%
1991	947,870	+1.75%
2001	1,066,878	+1.19%
2011	1,192,811	+1.12%

Religions in Dhenkanal district (2011)
Religion	Percent
Hinduism	99.39%
Islam	0.40%
Other or not stated	0.21%

According to the 2011 census Dhenkanal district has a population of 1,192,811, roughly equal to the nation of Timor-Leste or the US state of Rhode Island. This gives it a ranking of 400th in India (out of a total of 640). The district has a population density of 268 inhabitants per square kilometre (690/sq mi) . Its population growth rate over the decade 2001–2011 was 11.82%. Dhenkanal has a sex ratio of 947 females for every 1000 males, and a literacy rate of 79.41%. 9.85% of the population lives in urban areas. Scheduled Castes and Scheduled Tribes made up 19.62% and 13.59% of the population respectively.

Languages in Dhenkanal district (2011)
1. Odia (96.2%)
2. Munda (1.24%)
3. Santali (0.91%)
4. Others (1.68%)

At the time of the 2011 Census of India, 96.17% of the population in the district spoke Odia, 1.24% Munda, 0.91% Santali and 0.48% Juang as their first language.

== Education ==
Dhenkanal is home to the Indian Institute of Mass Communication, the only institute in Odisha for the study of journalism and mass communication.

Other colleges and schools, universities, and institutes include:

- Synergy Institute of Engineering & Technology
- Indira Gandhi Institute of Technology
- Dhenkanal College

== Notable people ==
- Sarangadhar Das
- Dewan Atharuddin Mohammed Athar
- Nandini Satpathy
- Kamakhya Prasad Singh Deo
- Suparno Satpathy
- Devendra Satpathy
- Tathagata Satpathy
- Kalpana Dash

== Villages ==
- Dhirapatana
- Janhitaila
- Makuakateni
- Pingua
- Kalingapal
- Rasol

== See also ==
- Karamul
