= National Highway 655 (India) =

National Highway in India

National Highway 655
- Map of National Highway 655 in red

Route information
- Auxiliary route of NH 55
- Length: 86 km (53 mi)

Major junctions
- North end: Angul
- South end: Krushnashyampur

Location
- Country: India
- States: Odisha

Highway system
- Roads in India; Expressways; National; State; Asian
← NH 55	→ NH 55

National Highway 655, commonly referred to as NH 655 is a national highway in India. It is a secondary route of National Highway 55. NH-655 runs in the state of Odisha in India.

== Route ==
NH655 connects Angul (Angul Stadium), Mahidharpur, Satmile, Rasol, Bhapur, Athagarh, Gopinathapur, Totapada and Krushnashyampur in the state of Odisha.

== Junctions ==
NH 55 Terminal near Angul.
NH 55 Terminal near Krushnashyampur.

== See also ==
- List of national highways in India
- List of national highways in India by state
