= Astaprahari =

Ritual chanting function of Hindus

Astaprahari or Ashtaprahari is a Hindu ritual function performed in praise of the deity Krishna. Devotees participating in the function chant the name of the deity continuously for twenty-four hours in turn without break. The function is performed outside a house on specified days with particular instruments. It is mainly performed in the Indian states of Odisha and West Bengal.

== Preparations ==
Before the start of the function, the entrance courtyard in front of the house where the event is planned occur is cleaned and decorated. The roof is temporarily covered by bamboo, coconut leaves and branches, or clothes for protection from the weather. The yard's soil is washed and mopped by sacred cows' dung water and left to dry.

Coloured flags and papers are cut for decorations. The pole bars and the stage are decorated with coloured paper. A stage (mandapa) is erected at the centre of the courtyard. A coloured cotton cloth (a shamiana) is spread over the centre stage as its roof. The stage is made of a whole tree or by placing stools in pyramid form and is covered by a white cloth. Large framed images of various deities associated with Krishna are placed on all four sides of these stools in tier to tier.

Flower garlands are placed on each image, then on the stage. Lighting decoration is also done in the courtyard and on the stage. An expert priest for conducting the ritual is invited. He arrives on the first day and stays until the end of the function. On the first day, one base group of devotees is invited from the locality to start the puja, a prayer ritual. This day is called Adhibasa, in which puja begins after midnight in the early morning.

== Procedure and conclusion ==
At roughly three o'clock in the morning, a group of devotees carry an empty earthen pot or pitcher to the nearest river or canal to fill with water. The container is then placed in the centre of the stage. While bringing water, the priest worships and chants. A clay lamp with ghee and cotton is lit and kept inside an earthen cover. The pot's body has small perforations or holes to allow oxygen through for continued burning. The welcoming prayer ritual concludes around 4:30 am. The organizers of Ashibasa start the singing portion of the function.

The group in the chorus always recites the scared names of Krishna in the form of rhythmical music along with various instruments while walking clockwise around the centre stage. Devotional words are recited and sung in rhythm. These words are also written or painted prominently on a board fixed at the entrance and displayed to the devotees, visitors and the public. This display reminds the newly invited chorus group of devotees to prepare to sing and recite after joining the devotional chorus called the Sankirtan. Singing continues with more members joining and others leaving without interruption. On the completion day, devotional songs are sung by moving groups, passing along house by house. The moving singers may be offered gifts from the household before returning to the stage.

During the concluding ceremony of the function, the priest reads the sacred book of the Astaprahari in rhythm; others follow and repeat. An earthen pot with curd-water and turmeric paste is prepared. The person for whom the Astaprahari has been reserved is smeared with sandalwood and turmeric pastes on their body and forehead. A cloth is wrapped as a turban on their head. The earthen pot containing the curd water and turmeric mixture in balanced on the subjects head, and they walk around the stage with the pot on their head. The curd water mixture is then flicked over the crowd with mango leaves.

At the end of the function, the priest leads a chorus, after which the curd and turmeric mixture may be applied to all present.
