= Hindol State =

Princely state in Odisha, India

Coordinates: 20.36°N 85.2°E

Hindol State ହିନ୍ଦୋଳ
- Princely State of British India
- 1554–1948
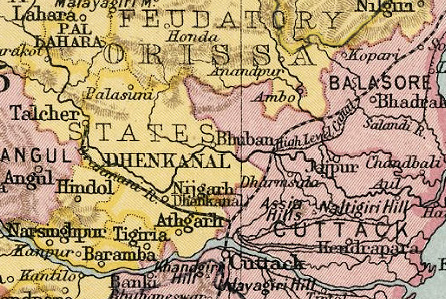
- Hindol State in the Imperial Gazetteer of India
- Area
  - 1891: 808 km^{2} (312 sq mi)
- Population
  - 1891: 47,180
- History
  - Established: 1554
  - Accession to the Indian Union: 1948
Succeeded by
India

Hindol State was one of the princely states of India during the British Raj belonging to Eastern Ganga dynasty. Its former territory is now part of Dhenkanal district. The state's former capital was the town of Hindol, Odisha. Until 1947, it was not part of British India but was subject to the suzerainty of the British crown, under the Orissa States Agency.

== History ==
The Hindol state was founded in 1554 with the overthrow of two ruling brothers, Chandradeva Jenamani and Udhavadeva Jenamani, belonging to the family of the Badakhemundi Raja of Ganjam, which was a branch of the Paralakhemundi line of the Eastern Ganga dynasty. After the East India Company occupied Orissa in September–October 1803 treaties were signed with estates of the region, including Hindol.

After the independence of India in 1947, Hindol merged into the Republic of India on 1 January 1948. Thereafter in 1948, once all the princely states including Dhenkanal, Talcher, Athmallik, Pal Lahara and Hindol formally merged with the province of Orissa, the present Dhenkanal district was created.

== Rulers ==
The rulers of Hindol were descendants from the Badakhemundi branch of the Eastern Ganga dynasty.

- Chandradeva Jenamani (1554)
- Udhavadeva Jenamani (1554-1581)
- Dameidev Jenamani (1581-1587)
- Brajabehari Jenamani
- Ramachandradeva Jenamani
- Nakuladeva Jenamani (-1623)
- Nandadeva Maharatha (1623-1640)
- Rushideva Maharatha (1640-1642)
- Gajendradeva Maharatha
- Harideva Maharatha (-1670)
- Brundaban Singh Narendra (1670-1679)
- Narahari Singh Narendra (1679-1691)
- Achyuta Singh Narendra (1691-1701)
- Bhagabat Singh Narendra (1701-1733)
- Damodar Singh Narendra (1733-1770)
- Radhamani Singh Mardraja Jagadeba (1770-1781)
- Ram Chandra Singh Mardraja Jagadeba (1781-1786)
- Krushna Chandra Singh Mardraja Jagadeba (1786-1829)
- Harihara Singh Mardraja Jagadeba (1829-1841)
- Ishwar Singh Mardraja Jagadeba (1841-1874)
- Phakir Singh Mardraja Jagadeba (1874-1876)
- Janardan Singh Mardraja Jagadeba (1876–1906)
- Naba Kishor Chandra Mardraja Jagadeba (1906–1 January 1948)

=== Titular ===
- Naba Kishor Chandra Mardraj Jagadeba (1 January 1948 - 1960)
- Pratap Chandra Singh Deo (1960 - 12 July 1991)
- Shailendra Narayan Singh Deo (12 July 1991 - current)
