= Kamakhya Prasad Singh Deo =

Indian politician (born 1941)

Honorary Brigadier (Colonel) K P Singh Deo AVSM
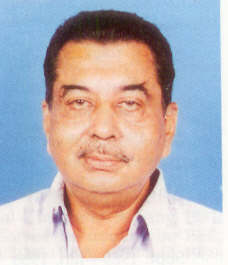

Member: Rajya Sabha and 4th, 7th, 8th, 10th, 11th & 13th Lok Sabha
- Constituency: Dhenkanal

Personal details
- Born: 6 August 1941 (age 85) Calcutta, Bengal Presidency, British India (present-day Kolkata, India)
- Party: Indian National Congress
- Spouse: Krishna Devi
- Children: 2 son and 3 daughters
- Parent: Ratnaprava Devi (mother)
- Military career
- Allegiance: India
- Branch: Indian Army
- Service years: 1971–1995
- Rank: Honorary Brigadier
- Unit: Territorial Army
- Conflicts: Indo-Pakistani War of 1971
- Awards: Ati Vishisht Seva Medal
- As of 17 May, 2012

Honorary Brigadier (Colonel) Kamakhya Prasad Singh Deo AVSM (born 6 August 1941), the scion of Dhenkanal is a former Member of Parliament and a retired Indian Territorial Army officer. He was a member of the 4th, 7th, 8th, 10th, 11th and 13th Lok Sabha. He was first elected to Lok Sabha in 1967 representing Swatantra Party.

== Early life ==
K.P. Singh Dev is the son of the late Shankar Pratap Singh Dev, the last Raja of Dhenkanal. He was educated at La Martiniere Calcutta.

=== Political career ===
In the 1967 Lok Sabha elections, he stood as a candidate for the Swatantra Party and was elected from the Dhenkanal constituency of Odisha. Aged 25, he was among the youngest MPs elected that year. From 1967 until 1970, he served as chief whip for the party in the Lok Sabha. By 1980, he had transferred his allegiance to the Indian National Congress. He was the president of the Orissa Pradesh Congress Committee.

=== Military career ===
Singh Dev was commissioned a Territorial Army second lieutenant in the Regiment of Artillery on 1 June 1971. He was awarded Ati Vishisht Seva Medal (AVSM) in 1994. He was ADC to the President of India. Upon reaching retirement age, he was promoted colonel on 30 August 1995, and retired the following day. On 10 October 1997, he was granted the honorary rank of brigadier.

He contested in the General Election 2019 as an Indian National Congress candidate from Dhenkanal . Not only did he get defeated in that election, he also lost election deposit.

== Dates of rank ==
Insignia	Rank	Component	Date of rank
	Second Lieutenant	Territorial Army	1 June 1971
	Lieutenant	Territorial Army	1 June 1975
	Captain	Territorial Army	1 June 1979
	Major	Territorial Army	4 June 1986
	Lieutenant-Colonel	Territorial Army	4 March 1993 (seniority from 1 January 1993)
	Colonel	Territorial Army	30 August 1995
	Brigadier	Territorial Army	10 October 1997 (honorary)
