= Suparno Satpathy =

Indian politician, social activist

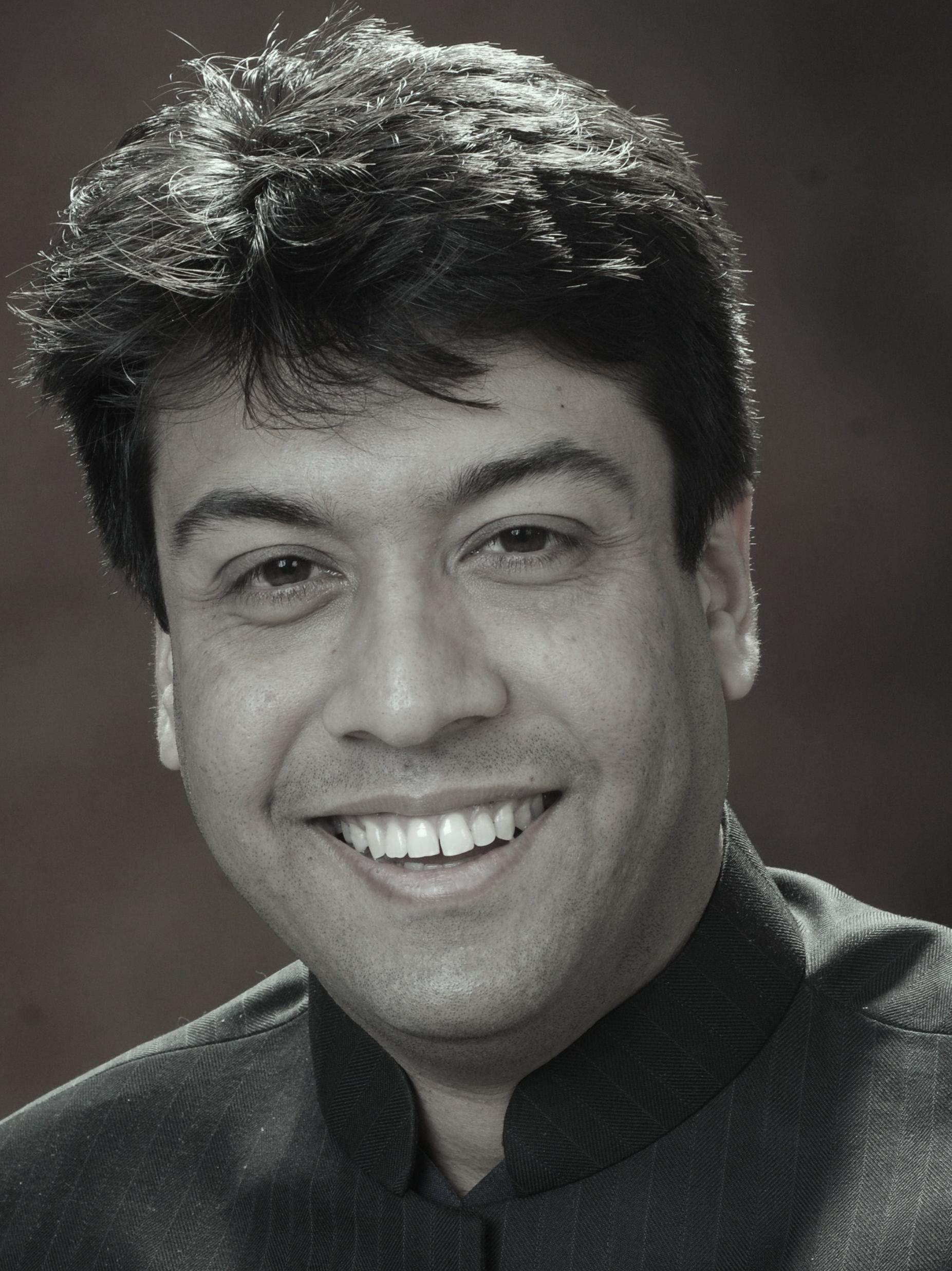

Suparno Satpathy is a socio-political leader from the state of Odisha. He is the great-grandson of Padma Bhushan Dr. Kalindi Charan Panigrahi and the grand son of Legendary Smt. Nandini Satpathy. He is the son of Pami and Nachiketa Satapathy.

He is the Chairman of Smt. Nandini Satpathy Memorial Trust (SNSMT), a leading non-profit social cause organisation. From 2007 till 2012 he held the office of Convenor PMSA-Orissa, MoPR, Government of India

He was a part of the Indian National Congress Party from December 2006 until 21 March 2014. He joined Aama Odisha Party a day after resigning from the Congress. Suparno Satpathy unsuccessfully contested a seat representing Dhenkanal in the Lok Sabha, the lower house of Indian Parliament, in the 2014 Indian general election

He is a lead member of the Netaji movement.

Shri. Suparno Satpathy is a columnist who writes about socio-political and environmental issues.

== See also ==
- List of political families (India)
