= Dhenkanal =

- town
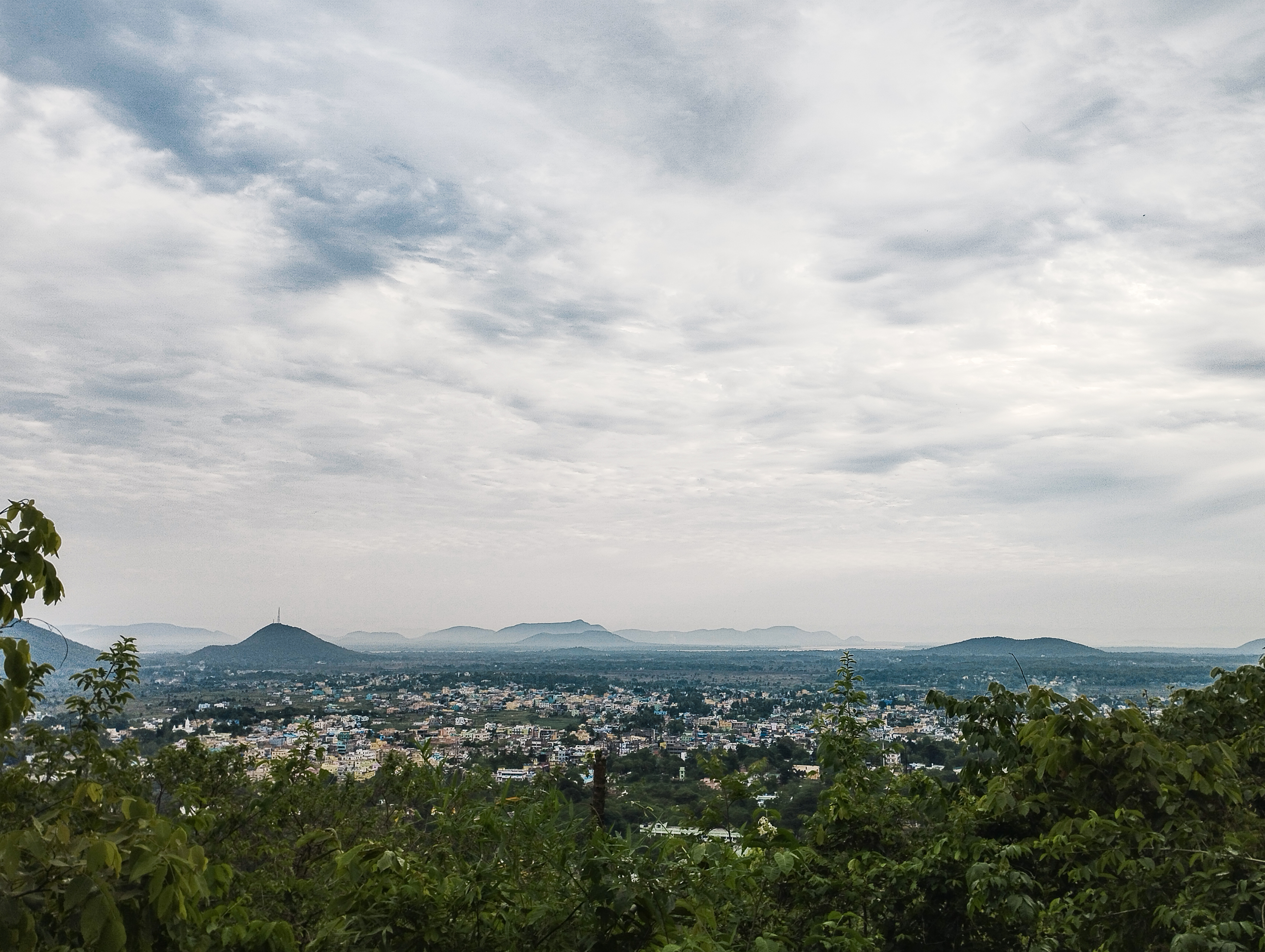
- View of the town from Hanuman Hill

- Location in Odisha, India Dhenkanal (India)
- Coordinates: 20.67°N 85.6°E
- Country: India
- State: Odisha
- District: Dhenkanal

Government
  - Type: Municipality

Area
  - Total: 31 km^{2} (12 sq mi)
- Elevation: 80 m (260 ft)

Population (2011)
  - Total: 67,414
  - Density: 1,865/km^{2} (4,830/sq mi)
- Demonym: Dhankanalia

Languages
  - Official: Odia
- Time zone: UTC+5:30 (IST)
- PIN: 759001
- Telephone code: 06762
- Vehicle registration: OD-06
- Website: www.dhenkanalmunicipality.com

Dhenkanal is a town and a municipality in Dhenkanal district in the state of Odisha, India.

== Geography ==
Dhenkanal is at 20.67°N 85.6°E. It has an average elevation of 80 metres (262 feet).

== Demographics ==
As per the 2011 India census, Dhenkanal had a population of 67,414. Males constitute 53% of the population and females 47%. Dhenkanal has an average literacy rate of 79%, higher than the national average of 59.5%. Male literacy is 84% and female literacy is 74%. In Dhenkanal, 10% of the population is under 6 years of age.

== Notable people ==
- Amiya Kumari Padhi, High Court judge
- Rudra Narayan Pany, member of Parliament
- Nandini Satpathy
- Suparno Satpathy
- Kamakhya Prasad Singh Deo
- Devendra Satpathy
- Gati Krushna Misra
- Tathagata Satpathy
- Kalpana Dash
