= List of postage stamps of India (1991–2000) =

This is a list of commemorative postage stamps issued by the India Post between 1991 and 2000.

== 1991 ==
| # | Issue date | Description | Image | Denomination |
|---|---|---|---|---|
| 1 | 20 Jan 1991 | Benaras Hindu University | | 100 |
| 2 | 30 Jan 1991 | Road Safety | | 650 |
| 3 | 12 Feb 1991 | Seventh Triennale | | 650 |
| 4 | 15 Feb 1991 | Jaganath Shunkerseth | | 200 |
| 5 | 28 Feb 1991 | Tata Memorial Centre | | 200 |
| * | | Marine mammals, (Set of 2 Stamps) | | |
| 6 | 4 Mar 1991 | river dolphin | | 400 |
| 7 | 4 Mar 1991 | sea cow | | 650 |
| 8 | 5 Mar 1991 | Beware of Drugs | | 500 |
| 9 | 7 Mar 1991 | World Peace | | 650 |
| 10 | 18 Mar 1991 | Indian Remote Sensing Satellite-1A | | 650 |
| 11 | 5 Apr 1991 | Babu Jagjivan Ram | | 100 |
| 12 | 14 Apr 1991 | Dr. B. R. Ambedkar | | 100 |
| * | | Tribal Dances, (Set of 4 Stamps) | | |
| 13 | 30 Apr 1991 | Valar dance | | 250 |
| 14 | 30 Apr 1991 | Kayang dance | | 400 |
| 15 | 30 Apr 1991 | Hojagiri Dance | | 500 |
| 16 | 30 Apr 1991 | Velakali | | 650 |
| 17 | 18 May 1991 | Ariyakudi Ramanuja Iyengar | | 200 |
| 18 | 30 May 1991 | Karpoori Thakur | | 100 |
| 19 | 23 Jun 1991 | Antarctic Treaty (Se-tenant) | | 500, 650 |
| 20 | 25 Jun 1991 | New Delhi-Diamond Jubilee (Se-tenant) | | 500, 650 |
| 21 | 27 Jun 1991 | Shriram Sharma Acharya | | 100 |
| * | | K. Shankar Pillai - Cartoons, (Set of 2 Stamps) | | |
| 22 | 31 Jul 1991 | Shankar Awarded Padma Vibhushan | | 400 |
| 23 | 31 Jul 1991 | 'The Big Show !' | | 650 |
| 24 | 3 Aug 1991 | Sri Prakasa | | 200 |
| 25 | 5 Aug 1991 | Gopinath Bordoloi | | 100 |
| 26 | 20 Aug 1991 | Rajiv Gandhi | | 100 |
| 27 | 24 Aug 1991 | Jain Muni Mishrimal Ji | | 100 |
| 28 | 16 Sep 1991 | Mahadevi Varma - Jayshankar Prasad (Se-tenant) | | 200, 200 |
| 29 | 27 Sep 1991 | 37th Commonwealth Parliamentary Conference | | 650 |
| 30 | 30 Sep 1991 | Greetings (Se-tenant) | | 100, 650 |
| * | | Orchids, (Set of 6 Stamps) | | |
| 31 | 12 Oct 1991 | Cymbidium aloifolium | | 100 |
| 32 | 12 Oct 1991 | Paphiopedilum venustum | | 250 |
| 33 | 12 Oct 1991 | Aerides crispum | | 300 |
| 34 | 12 Oct 1991 | Cymbidium bicolour | | 400 |
| 35 | 12 Oct 1991 | Vanda spathulata | | 500 |
| 36 | 12 Oct 1991 | Cymbidium devonianum | | 650 |
| 37 | 18 Oct 1991 | 2nd Battalion - The 3rd Gorkha Rifles | | 400 |
| * | | Kamaladevi Chattopadhyaya, (Set of 2 Stamps) | | |
| 38 | 29 Oct 1991 | Handicrafts | | 100 |
| 39 | 29 Oct 1991 | Puppet | | 650 |
| 40 | 7 Nov 1991 | Chithira Thirunal Balarama Varma | | 200 |
| 41 | 14 Nov 1991 | 18 Cavalry | | 650 |
| 42 | 14 Nov 1991 | Children's Day | | 100 |
| 43 | 15 Nov 1991 | India Tourism Year 1991 | | 650 |
| 44 | 18 Nov 1991 | International Conference on Youth Tourism | | 650 |
| 45 | 5 Dec 1991 | Mozart | | 650 |
| 46 | 7 Dec 1991 | SAARC Year of Shelter | | 400 |
| 47 | 11 Dec 1991 | Run for your Heart | | 100 |
| 48 | 28 Dec 1991 | Asit Kumar Haldar | | 200 |
| * | | Yogasana, (Set of 4 Stamps) | | |
| 49 | 30 Dec 1991 | Bhujangasana | | 200 |
| 50 | 30 Dec 1991 | Dhanurasana | | 500 |
| 51 | 30 Dec 1991 | Ustrasana | | 650 |
| 52 | 30 Dec 1991 | Utthita Trikonasana | | 1000 |

== 1992 ==
| # | Issue date | Description | Image | Denomination |
|---|---|---|---|---|
| 1 | 21 Feb 1992 | Y. M. C. A. | | 100 |
| 2 | 1 Mar 1992 | International Association for Bridge and Structural Engineering (Se-tenant) | | 200 (each) |
| 3 | 2 Mar 1992 | V International Conference on Goats | | 600 |
| 4 | 20 Apr 1992 | National Archives | | 600 |
| 5 | 25 Apr 1992 | Krushna Chandra Gajapati | | 100 |
| 6 | 29 Apr 1992 | Vijay Singh Pathik | | 100 |
| * | | Adventure Sports, (Set of 4 Stamps) | | |
| 7 | 29 Apr 1992 | Hand Gliding | | 200 |
| 8 | 29 Apr 1992 | Wind Surfing | | 400 |
| 9 | 29 Apr 1992 | River Rafting | | 500 |
| 10 | 29 Apr 1992 | Skiing | | 1100 |
| 11 | 9 May 1992 | Henry Gidney | | 100 |
| 12 | 30 May 1992 | Telecommunication Training Centre, Jabalpur | | 100 |
| 13 | 31 Jul 1992 | Udham Singh | | 100 |
| * | | XXV Olympics, (Set of 4 Stamps) | | |
| 14 | 8 Aug 1992 | Discus Throw | | 100 |
| 15 | 8 Aug 1992 | Gymnastics | | 600 |
| 16 | 8 Aug 1992 | Hockey | | 800 |
| 17 | 8 Aug 1992 | Boxing | | 1100 |
| * | | Quit India, (Set of 2 Stamps) | | |
| 18 | 9 Aug 1992 | Spinning Wheel | | 100 |
| 19 | 9 Aug 1992 | Gandhi | | 200 |
| 20 | 10 Aug 1992 | 60 Para Field Ambulance | | 100 |
| 21 | 30 Aug 1992 | Dr. S. R. Ranganathan | | 100 |
| 22 | 2 Sep 1992 | Phad Painting - Dev Narayan | | 500 |
| 23 | 19 Sep 1992 | Hanuman Prasad Poddar | | 100 |
| 24 | 8 Oct 1992 | IAF : Diamond Jubilee (Se-tenant) | | 100, 1000 |
| 25 | 13 Nov 1992 | Sisters of Jesus & Mary | | 100 |
| 26 | 14 Nov 1992 | Children's Day | | 100 |
| 27 | 2 Dec 1992 | Shri Yogiji Maharaj | | 100 |
| 28 | 08 Dec 1992 | Army Service Corps | | 100 |
| 29 | 19 Dec 1992 | Rocket Mail - Stephen Smith | | 1100 |
| 30 | 20 Dec 1992 | Silver Jubilee of Haryana | | 200 |
| 31 | 28 Dec 1992 | Madan Lal Dhingra | | 100 |
| * | | Birds of prey, (Set of 4 Stamps) | | |
| 32 | 30 Dec 1992 | osprey | | 200 |
| 33 | 30 Dec 1992 | shahin falcon | | 600 |
| 34 | 30 Dec 1992 | Himalayan bearded vulture | | 800 |
| 35 | 30 Dec 1992 | Himalayan golden eagle | | 1100 |
| 36 | 31 Dec 1992 | Pandit Ravishankar Shukla | | 100 |

== 1993 ==
| # | Issue date | Description | Image | Denomination |
|---|---|---|---|---|
| 1 | 9 Jan 1993 | William Carey | | 600 |
| 2 | 14 Jan 1993 | Fakir Mohan Senapati | | 100 |
| 3 | 28 Feb 1993 | CSIR Golden Jubilee | | 100 |
| 4 | 1 Apr 1993 | 9 Parachute Field Regiment - Golden Jubilee | | 100 |
| 5 | 1 Apr 1993 | Tigers of the Sky | | 100 |
| 6 | 9 Apr 1993 | Rahul Sankrityayan | | 100 |
| 7 | 11 Apr 1993 | 89th Inter-Parliamentary Union Conference | | 100 |
| * | | Mountain Locomotives, (Set of 4 Stamps) | | |
| 8 | 16 Apr 1993 | Neral Matheran | | 100 |
| 9 | 16 Apr 1993 | D. H. R. (Darjeeling) | | 600 |
| 10 | 16 Apr 1993 | Nilgiri Mountain Railway | | 800 |
| 11 | 16 Apr 1993 | Kalka Simla | | 1100 |
| 12 | 25 Apr 1993 | Meerut College | | 100 |
| 13 | 29 Jun 1993 | Prasanta Chandra Mahalanobis | | 100 |
| 14 | 31 Jul 1993 | Bombay Municipal Corporation Building | | 200 |
| 15 | 9 Aug 1993 | Khan Abdul Ghaffar Khan | | 100 |
| 16 | 19 Aug 1993 | National Integration | | 100 |
| 17 | 26 Aug 1993 | Dadabhai Naoroji - Centenary of Election to the House of Commons | | 600 |
| 18 | 11 Sep 1993 | Swami Vivekananda Centenary of Chicago Address | | 200 |
| * | | Flowering trees, (Set of 4 Stamps) | | |
| 19 | 9 Oct 1993 | Lagerstroemia speciosa | | 100 |
| 20 | 9 Oct 1993 | Cochlospermum religiosum | | 600 |
| 21 | 9 Oct 1993 | Erythrina variegata | | 800 |
| 22 | 9 Oct 1993 | Thespesia populnea | | 1100 |
| 23 | 8 Nov 1993 | Dr. Dwaram Venkataswamy Naidu | | 100 |
| 24 | 8 Nov 1993 | Golden Jubilee of College of Military Engineering, Pune | | 200 |
| 25 | 14 Nov 1993 | Children's Day | | 100 |
| 26 | 9 Dec 1993 | Heart Care Festival | | 650 |
| 27 | 9 Dec 1993 | Dr. Dwarkanath Kotnis | | 100 |
| 27 | 11 Dec 1993 | India Tea | | 600 |
| 28 | 16 Dec 1993 | Papal Seminary Pune Centenary | | 600 |
| 29 | 23 Dec 1993 | Meghnad Saha | | 100 |
| 30 | 25 Dec 1993 | Inpex-93: Speed Post | | 100 |
| 31 | 27 Dec 1993v | Inpex-93: Custom House, Wharf Calcutta | | 200 |
| 32 | 29 Dec 1993 | Dinanath Mangeshkar | | 100 |
| 33 | 30 Dec 1993 | Nargis Dutt | | 100 |
| 34 | 31 Dec 1993 | INA Golden Jubilee | | 100 |

== 1994 ==
| # | Issue date | Description | Image | Denomination |
|---|---|---|---|---|
| 1 | 1 January | Satyendra Nath Bose | | 100 |
| 2 | 10 Jan 1994 | Dr. Sampurnanand | | 100 |
| 3 | 11 Jan 1994 | Satyajit Ray (Se-tenant) | | 1100, 600 |
| 4 | 21 Feb 1994 | Dr. Shanti Swarup Bhatnagar | | 100 |
| 5 | 7 Mar 1994 | Prajapita Brahma | | 100 |
| 6 | 14 Mar 1994 | Eighth Triennale-India | | 600 |
| 7 | 26 Mar 1994 | UPASI - Centenary | | 200 |
| 8 | 9 Apr 1994 | Rani Rashmoni | | 100 |
| 9 | 13 Apr 1994 | 75th Anniversary of the Jallianwala Bagh Martyrdom | | 100 |
| 10 | 23 Apr 1994 | Chandra Singh Garhwali | | 100 |
| 11 | 1 May 1994 | 75th Anniversary of the International Labour Organization | | 600 |
| 12 | 25 May 1994 | IPTA | | 200 |
| 13 | 12 Aug 1994 | The Madras Regiment 4th BN (WLI) | | 650 |
| 14 | 23 Sep 1994 | Institute of Mental Health, Madras | | 200 |
| 15 | 2 Oct 1994 | 125 Years of Mahatma Gandhi (Se-tenant) | | 600, 1100 |
| 16 | 30 Oct 1994 | XVI International Cancer Congress | | 600 |
| 17 | 8 Nov 1994 | Human Resource Development World Conference | | 600 |
| 18 | 14 Nov 1994 | Children's Day | | 100 |
| 19 | 20 Nov 1994 | International Year of the Family | | 200 |
| 20 | 21 Nov 1994 | Khuda Bakhsh Oriental Public Library | | 600 |
| 21 | 29 Nov 1994 | J. R. D. Tata | | 200 |
| 22 | 30 Nov 1994 | Calcutta Blind School Centenary | | 200 |
| 23 | 4 Dec 1994 | 125th Anniversary of St. Xaviers College, Bombay | | 200 |
| 24 | 14 Dec 1994 | 215 Years of Remount Veterinary Corps | | 600 |
| 25 | 19 Dec 1994 | College of Engineering, Guindy, Madras | | 200 |
| 26 | 20 Dec 1994 | Baroda Museum (Se-tenant) | | 600, 1100 |
| 27 | 28 Dec 1994 | 200 Years of Bombay G. P. O. | | 600 |

== 1995 ==
| # | Issue date | Description | Image | Denomination |
|---|---|---|---|---|
| 1 | 5 Jan 1995 | Eighth International Conference-Seminar of Tamil Studies, Thanjavur | | 200 |
| 2 | 7 Jan 1995 | Indian National Science Academy | | 600 |
| 3 | 9 Jan 1995 | Chhotu Ram | | 100 |
| 4 | 11 Jan 1995 | 100 Years of Cinema (Se-tenant) | | 1100, 600 |
| 5 | 12 Jan 1995 | SAARC Youth Year | | 200 |
| 6 | 15 Jan 1995 | Prithvi Theatre | | 200 |
| 7 | 15 Jan 1995 | Field Marshal K. M. Cariappa | | 200 |
| 8 | 18 Jan 1995 | Tex-Styles India'95 | | 200 |
| 9 | 18 Feb 1995 | Rafi Ahmed Kidwai | | 100 |
| 10 | 4 Apr 1995 | K. L. Saigal | | 500 |
| 11 | 1 May 1995 | R. S. Ruikar | | 100 |
| 12 | 17 May 1995 | 100 Years of Radio Communication | | 500 |
| 13 | 23 May 1995 | Delhi Development Authority | | 200 |
| * | | 50 Years of The United Nations, (Set of 2 Stamps) | | |
| 14 | 26 Jun 1995 | Handshake | | 100 |
| 15 | 30 Aug 1995 | Work On UN Agencies | | 600 |
| 16 | 4 Sep 1995 | The Asian Pacific Postal Training Centre, Bangkok | | 1000 |
| 17 | 26 Sep 1995 | Defence Headquarters Delhi Area | | 200 |
| 18 | 28 Sep 1995 | Louis Pasteur | | 500 |
| 19 | 1 Oct 1995 | 150 Anniversary of La Martiniere College, Lucknow | | 200 |
| 20 | 2 Oct 1995 | India-South Africa Cooperation (Se-tenant) | | 100, 200 |
| 21 | 16 Oct 1995 | 50 Years of Food and Agriculture Organization | | 500 |
| 22 | 30 Oct 1995 | Pasumpon U. Muthuramalingam Thevar | | 100 |
| 23 | 8 Nov 1995 | W. C. Roentgen | | 600 |
| 24 | 14 Nov 1995 | Children's Day | | 100 |
| 25 | 20 Nov 1995 | Jat Regiment | | 500 |
| 26 | 28 Nov 1995 | 175th Anniversary 5th BN (Napiers) The Rajputana Rifles | | 500 |
| 27 | 10 Dec 1995 | Sant Tukdoji Maharaj | | 100 |
| 28 | 19 Dec 1995 | Dr. Yellapragada Subbarow | | 100 |
| 29 | 25 Dec 1995 | Giani Zail Singh | | 100 |
| 30 | 31 Dec 1995 | Ahmed Raza Khan Barelvi | | 100 |

== 1996 ==
| # | Issue date | Description | Image | Denomination |
|---|---|---|---|---|
| 1 | 09 Feb 1996 | Tata Institute of Fundamental Research | | 200 |
| 2 | 22 Feb 1996 | Kasturba Trust - Tribute To Ba | | 100 |
| 3 | 25 Feb 1996 | 100 Years of Cardiac Surgery | | 500 |
| * | | Ritu Rang, (Set of 4 Stamps) | | |
| 4 | 13 Mar 1996 | Vasant | | 500 |
| 5 | 13 Mar 1996 | Greeshm | | 500 |
| 6 | 13 Mar 1996 | Varsha | | 500 |
| 7 | 13 Mar 1996 | Hemant | | 500 |
| * | | Cricket India, (Set of 4 Stamps) | | |
| 8 | 13 Mar 1996 | C. K. Nayudu | | 200 |
| 9 | 13 Mar 1996 | D. B. Deodhar | | 200 |
| 10 | 13 Mar 1996 | Vinoo Mankad | | 200 |
| 11 | 13 Mar 1996 | Vijay Merchant | | 200 |
| 12 | 18 Mar 1996 | Kunji Lal Dubey | | 100 |
| 13 | 10 Apr 1996 | Morarji Desai | | 100 |
| * | | Himalayan Ecology, (Set of 4 Stamps) | | |
| 14 | 10 May 1996 | Capra falconeri | | 500 |
| 15 | 10 May 1996 | Ithaginis Cruentus | | 500 |
| 16 | 10 May 1996 | Saussurea Simpsoniana | | 500 |
| 17 | 10 May 1996 | Meconopsis Horridula | | 500 |
| 18 | 25 May 1996 | S. K. C. G. College | | 100 |
| 19 | 5 May 1996 | Muhammad Ismail Sahib | | 100 |
| * | | Spirit of Olympics, (Set of 2 Stamps) | | |
| 20 | 25 May 1996 | Marble Stadium, Athens | | 500 |
| 21 | 25 May 1996 | Olympic Torch | 60px | 500 |
| 22 | 19 Jul 1996 | Blessed Alphonsa | | 100 |
| 23 | 2 Aug 1996 | Videsh Sanchar Nigam Ltd. | | 500 |
| 24 | 4 Aug 1996 | Sir Pherozshah Mehta | | 100 |
| 25 | 25 Aug 1996 | Ahilyabai Holkar | | 200 |
| 26 | 28 Aug 1996 | Chembai Vaidyanatha Bhagavathar | | 100 |
| 27 | 2 Aug 1996 | XX World Poultry Congress - Gallus gallus Linn | | 500 |
| 28 | 12 Sep 1996 | Rani Gaidinliu | | 100 |
| 29 | 25 Sep 1996 | Barrister Nath Pai | | 100 |
| 30 | 5 Oct 1996 | Indepex-97 | | 200 |
| 31 | 7 Oct 1996 | Silver Jubilee National Rail Museum | | 500 |
| 32 | 10 Oct 1996 | Jananayak Debeswar Sarmah | | 200 |
| 33 | 19 Oct 1996 | Sikh Regiment - 150 Years | | 500 |
| 34 | 12 Oct 1996 | Dr. Salim Ali Centenary (Se-tenant) | | 800, 1100 |
| 35 | 14 Nov 1996 | Children's Day | | 800 |
| 36 | 17 Nov 1996 | 2nd International Crop Science Congress | | 200 |
| 37 | 4 Dec 1996 | 2 Grenadiers - Bicentenary | | 500 |
| 38 | 8 Dec 1996 | SAARC - 10th Anniversary | | 1100 |
| 39 | 09 Dec 1996 | Abai Konunbaev | | 500 |
| 40 | 16 Dec 1996 | Vijay Divas | | 200 |
| 41 | 26 Dec 1996 | Vivekananda Rock Memorial, Kanyakumari | | 500 |
| 42 | 27 Dec 1996 | 150 Years of Anaesthesia | | 500 |

== 1997 ==
| # | Issue date | Description | Image | Denomination |
|---|---|---|---|---|
| 1 | 1 Jan 1997 | University of Roorkee | | 800 |
| 2 | 9 Jan 1997 | Dr. Vrindavan Lal Verma | | 200 |
| 3 | 22 Jan 1997 | Silver Jubilee A. P. S. Corps | | 500 |
| 4 | 23 Jan 1997 | Netaji Subhas Chandra Bose | | 100 |
| 5 | 28 Jan 1997 | Jose Marti | | 1100 |
| 6 | 15 Feb 1997 | Inter-Parliamentary Specialized Conference | | 500 |
| 7 | 25 Feb 1997 | St. Andrew's Church | | 800 |
| 8 | 28 Feb 1997 | Morarji Desai | | 100 |
| 9 | 4 Mar 1997 | Shyam Lal Gupta 'Parshad' | | 100 |
| 10 | 5 Mar 1997 | Jñāneśvar | | 500 |
| 11 | 8 Mar 1997 | Parijat tree (Se-tenant) | | 500, 600 |
| 12 | 13 Mar 1997 | Rashtriya Indian Military College, Dehradun | | 200 |
| 13 | 23 Mar 1997 | Ram Manohar Lohia | | 100 |
| 14 | 27 Mar 1997 | The Philatelic Society of India (Se-tenant) | | 200 (each) |
| 15 | 28 Mar 1997 | Jnanpith Award Winners – Kannada: Kuvempu, Bendre, Maasthi, Gokak | | 200 |
| 16 | 1 May 1997 | Madhu Limaye | | 200 |
| * | | Centres of Culture and Tourism INDEPEX'97, (Set of 4 Stamps) | | |
| 17 | 6 Jun 1997 | Nalanda | | 200 |
| 18 | 6 Jun 1997 | Bodhgaya | | 600 |
| 19 | 6 Jun 1997 | Vaishali | | 1000 |
| 20 | 6 Jun 1997 | Kushinagar | | 1100 |
| 21 | 24 Jun 1997 | Pt. Omkarnath Thakur | | 200 |
| 22 | 2 Jul 1997 | Ram Sewak Yadav | | 200 |
| 23 | 11 Jul 1997 | Sibnath Banerjee | | 200 |
| 24 | 6 Aug 1997 | Thirumathi Rukmini Lakshmipathi | | 200 |
| 25 | 8 Aug 1997 | Sri Basaveswara | | 200 |
| * | | Beaches of India : INDEPEX'97, (Set of 4 Stamps) | | |
| 26 | 11 Aug 1997 | Gopalpur on Sea - Odisha | | 200 |
| 27 | 11 Aug 1997 | Kovalam Beach - Thiruvananthapuram | | 600 |
| 28 | 11 Aug 1997 | Anjuna Beach - Goa | | 1000 |
| 29 | 11 Aug 1997 | Bogmalo Beach - Goa | | 1000 |
| 30 | 15 Aug 1997 | Swatantra Bharat | | 200 |
| 31 | 15 Aug 1997 | India's Struggle for Freedom Three INA Stalwarts | | 200 |
| 32 | 20 Aug 1997 | Sir Ronald Ross | | 200 |
| 33 | 28 Aug 1997 | Firaq Gorakhpuri | | 200 |
| 34 | 6 Sep 1997 | Bhaktivedanta Swami | | 500 |
| 35 | 7 Sep 1997 | 2nd Para (Maratha) Bicentenary | | 200 |
| * | | Birbal Sahni Institute of Palaeobotany, Lucknow, (Set of 4 Stamps) | | |
| 36 | 11 Sep 1997 | Birbalsahnia Divyadarshani | | 200 |
| 37 | 11 Sep 1997 | Glossopteris | | 200 |
| 38 | 11 Sep 1997 | Pentoxylon | | 600 |
| 39 | 11 Sep 1997 | Williamsonia sawardiana | | 1000 |
| 40 | 14 Sep 1997 | Swami Brahmanand | | 200 |
| 41 | 28 Sep 1997 | Sir William Jones | | 400 |
| 42 | 4 Oct 1997 | The Lawrence School Sanawar | | 200 |
| 43 | 6 Oct 1997 | V. K. Krishna Menon | | 200 |
| 44 | 15 Oct 1997 | 66th General Assembly Session of ICPO Interpol | | 400 |
| * | | Rural Indian Women - INDEPEX'97, (Set of 4 Stamps) | | |
| 45 | 15 Oct 1997 | Arunachal Pradesh | | 200 |
| 46 | 15 Oct 1997 | Gujarat | | 600 |
| 47 | 15 Oct 1997 | Ladakh | | 1000 |
| 48 | 15 Oct 1997 | Kerala | | 1100 |
| 49 | 20 Oct 1997 | Scindia School Centenary (Se-tenant) | | 500 |
| * | | Indian Medicinal Plants, (Set of 4 Stamps) | | |
| 50 | 28 Oct 1997 | Tulsi | | 200 |
| 51 | 28 Oct 1997 | Haridra | | 500 |
| 52 | 28 Oct 1997 | Sarpagandha | | 1000 |
| 53 | 28 Oct 1997 | Ghritkumari | | 1100 |
| 54 | 8 Nov 1997 | Sant Kavi Sunderdas | | 200 |
| 55 | 9 Nov 1997 | Kotamaraju Rama Rao | | 200 |
| 56 | 14 Nov 1997 | Children's Day | | 200 |
| 57 | 23 Nov 1997 | World Convention on Reverence for all life | | 400 |
| 58 | 13 Dec 1997 | Hazari Prasad Dwivedi | | 200 |
| 59 | 15 Dec 1997 | Sardar Vallabh Bhai Patel | | 200 |
| * | | Post Office Theme Indepex'97, (Set of 4 Stamps) | | |
| 60 | 15 Dec 1997 | Post Office Heritage Building | | 200 |
| 61 | 15 Dec 1997 | Indian River Mail | | 600 |
| 62 | 15 Dec 1997 | Cancellations & Jal Cooper | | 1000 |
| 63 | 15 Dec 1997 | Mail Ship S. S. Hindosthan | | 1100 |
| 64 | 16 Dec 1997 | 50 Years of India Armed Forces | | 200 |
| 65 | 17 Dec 1997 | Dr. Pattabhi Sitaramayya | | 200 |
| 66 | 18 Dec 1997 | Jerome D'Souza | | 200 |
| 67 | 19 Dec 1997 | Ram Prasad Bismil and Ashfaqullah Khan | | 200 |
| 68 | 30 Dec 1997 | Cellular Jail, Port Blair | | 200 |

== 1998 ==
| # | Issue date | Description | Image | Denomination |
|---|---|---|---|---|
| 1 | 2 Jan 1998 | Eleventh Gorkha Rifles Golden Jubilee | | 400 |
| 2 | 9 Jan 1998 | Nahar Singh | | 200 |
| 3 | 10 Jan 1998 | Nanak Singh | | 200 |
| 4 | 12 Jan 1998 | Rotary International | | 800 |
| 5 | 19 Jan 1998 | Maharana Pratap | | 200 |
| 6 | 19 Jan 1998 | V. S. Khandekar | | 200 |
| 7 | 25 Jan 1998 | Bharat Paryatan Diwas | | 1000 |
| 8 | 28 Jan 1998 | Dr. Jagdish Chandra Jain | | 200 |
| * | | Mahatma Gandhi : 50th Death Anniversary, (Se-tenant of four) | | |
| 9 | 30 Jan 1998 | Peasant's Welfare | | 200 |
| 10 | 30 Jan 1998 | Social Upliftment | | 600 |
| 11 | 30 Jan 1998 | Salt Satyagraha | | 1000 |
| 12 | 30 Jan 1998 | Communal Harmony | | 1100 |
| 13 | 25 Feb 1998 | Sardar A. Vedaratnam | | 200 |
| 14 | 8 Mar 1998 | Universal Declaration of Human Rights | | 600 |
| 15 | 10 Mar 1998 | Savitribai Phule | | 200 |
| 16 | 27 Mar 1998 | Syed Ahmed Khan | | 200 |
| 17 | 1 Apr 1998 | Global Environment Facility | | 1100 |
| 18 | 14 Apr 1998 | Sri Ramana Maharshi | | 200 |
| 19 | 16 Apr 1998 | Defence Services Staff College | | 600 |
| 20 | 1 May 1998 | N. G. Gore | | 200 |
| 21 | 1 May 1998 | Konkan Railway | | 800 |
| 22 | 3 May 1998 | Dr. Zakir Husain | | 200 |
| 23 | 15 May 1998 | Mohammed Abdur Rahiman | | 200 |
| 24 | 21 May 1998 | Lokanayak Omeo Kumar Das | | 200 |
| 25 | 25 May 1998 | Vakkom Abdul Khader | | 200 |
| 26 | 5 Jun 1998 | Jnanpith Award Winners : Bangla | | 200 |
| 27 | 8 Jun 1998 | Golden Jubilee of International Flight (Se-tenant) | | 500, 600 |
| 28 | 18 Jun 1998 | C. Vijayaraghavachariar | | 200 |
| 29 | 30 Jun 1998 | Golden Jubilee of National Savings Organisation (Se-tenant) | | 500, 600 |
| 30 | 3 Jul 1998 | Bhagawan Gopinath Ji | | 300 |
| 31 | 11 Jul 1998 | Godrej Centenary | | 300 |
| 32 | 16 Jul 1998 | Aruna Asaf Ali | | 300 |
| 33 | 29 Jul 1998 | 125 Years of Vidyasagar College | | 200 |
| 34 | 9 Aug 1998 | Acharya Shivpujan Sahay | | 200 |
| 35 | 15 Aug 1998 | Homage to Martyrs (Se-tenant) | | 300, 800 |
| 36 | 20 Aug 1998 | Gostha Paul | | 300 |
| 37 | 23 Aug 1998 | Youth Hostels Association of India - Golden Jubilee | | 500 |
| 38 | 15 Sep 1998 | Fourth Battalion Brigade of the Guards (1 Rajput) Bicentenary | | 600 |
| 39 | 18 Sep 1998 | Bhai Kanhaiya | | 200 |
| 40 | 18 Sep 1998 | 20th International Congress of Radiology | | 800 |
| 41 | 20 Sep 1998 | 26th IBBY Congress | | 1100 |
| 42 | 26 Sep 1998 | Dr. Tristão de Bragança Cunha | | 300 |
| 43 | 30 Sep 1998 | Jananeta Hijam Irawat Singh | | 300 |
| 44 | 5 Oct 1998 | Indian Women in Aviation | | 800 |
| 45 | 20 Oct 1998 | Acharya Tulsi | | 300 |
| 46 | 14 Nov 1998 | Children's Day | | 300 |
| 47 | 15 Nov 1998 | I. N. S. Delhi | | 300 |
| 48 | 16 Nov 1998 | President's Body Guard | | 300 |
| 49 | 30 Nov 1998 | 2nd Battalion of the Rajput Regiment (Kalichindi)-Bicentenary | | 300 |
| 50 | 30 Nov 1998 | David Sassoon Library & Reading Room | | 300 |
| 51 | 2 Dec 1998 | Army Postal Service Centre Golden Jubilee | | 300 |
| 52 | 5 Dec 1998 | Connemara Public Library | | 300 |
| 53 | 10 Dec 1998 | Indian Pharmaceutical Congress Association : Golden Jubilee | | 300 |
| 54 | 12 Dec 1998 | Baba Raghav Das | | 200 |
| 55 | 19 Dec 1998 | Lt. Indra Lal Roy, DFC | | 300 |
| 56 | 20 Dec 1998 | Sant Gadge Baba | | 300 |
| * | | Indian Musical Instruments, (Set of 4 Stamps) | | |
| 57 | 29 Dec 1998 | Flute | | 600 |
| 58 | 29 Dec 1998 | Pakhawaj | | 800 |
| 59 | 29 Dec 1998 | Sarod | | 1000 |
| 60 | 29 Dec 1998 | Rudra Veena | | 200 |
| * | | Seashells of Andaman and Nicobar Islands : International Year of the Ocean, (Set of 4 Stamps) | | |
| 61 | 30 Dec 1998 | Cypraea staphylaea | | 300 |
| 62 | 30 Dec 1998 | Cassis cornuta | | 300 |
| 63 | 30 Dec 1998 | Chicoreus | | 300 |
| 64 | 30 Dec 1998 | Lambis lambis brunneus | | 1100 |

== 1999 ==
| # | Issue date | Description | Image | Denomination |
|---|---|---|---|---|
| 1 | 13 Jan 1999 | Indian Police Service : Golden Jubilee | | 300 |
| 2 | 26 Jan 1999 | Defence Research and Development Organisation | | 1000 |
| 3 | 29 Jan 1999 | 150 Years of Newspapers in Assam | | 300 |
| 4 | 17 Feb 1999 | Hindu College, Delhi | | 300 |
| 5 | 19 Feb 1999 | National Defence Academy : Golden Jubilee | | 300 |
| 6 | 25 Feb 1999 | Sanskrit College, Calcutta | | 300 |
| 7 | 5 Mar 1999 | Biju Patnaik | | 300 |
| 8 | 5 Mar 1999 | Press Trust of India : Golden Jubilee | | 1500 |
| 9 | 6 Mar 1999 | Khajuraho Millennium | | 1500 |
| 10 | 18 Mar 1999 | Dr. K. B. Hedgewar | | 300 |
| * | | Maritime Heritage, (Set of 2 Stamps) | | |
| 11 | 5 Apr 1999 | Maritime Heritage | | 300 |
| 12 | 5 Apr 1999 | Maritime Heritage | | 300 |
| 13 | 9 Apr 1999 | Tercentenary - Birth of Khalsa | | 300 |
| 14 | 7 May 1999 | Bethune Collegiate School | | 300 |
| 15 | 11 May 1999 | Technology Day | | 300 |
| 16 | 26 Jun 1999 | 125 Years of Mumbai Port Trust | | 300 |
| 17 | 30 Jun 1999 | Mizoram Accord | | 300 |
| 18 | 4 Jul 1999 | Gulzarilal Nanda | | 300 |
| 19 | 7 Jul 1999 | Jijabai | | 300 |
| 20 | 8 Jul 1999 | P. S. Kumaraswamy Raja | | 300 |
| 21 | 19 Jul 1999 | Balai Chand Mukhopadhyay 'Banaphool' | | 300 |
| 22 | 28 Jul 1999 | Sindhu Darshan Festival | | 300 |
| 23 | 12 Aug 1999 | 50 Years of the Geneva Conventions | | 1500 |
| * | | India's Struggle for Freedom, (Set of 4 Stamps) | | |
| 24 | 15 Aug 1999 | Sardar Ajit Singh | | 300 |
| 25 | 15 Aug 1999 | Swami Ramanand Teerth | | 300 |
| 26 | 15 Aug 1999 | Swami Keshwanand | | 300 |
| 27 | 15 Aug 1999 | Vishwambhar Dayalu Tripathi | | 300 |
| 28 | 9 Sep 1999 | Kalki Krishnamurthy | | 300 |
| * | | Linguistic Harmony of India, (Set of 4 Stamps) | | |
| 29 | 14 Sep 1999 | Kazi Nazrul Islam | | 300 |
| 30 | 14 Sep 1999 | Ramdhari Sinha 'Dinkar' | | 300 |
| 31 | 14 Sep 1999 | Jhaverchand Kalidas Meghani | | 300 |
| 32 | 14 Sep 1999 | Rambriksh Benipuri | | 300 |
| 33 | 29 Sep 1999 | Arati Gupta (Saha) | | 300 |
| * | | Endangered Species : Asiatic lion (Panthera leo persica), (Set of 4 Stamps) | | |
| 34 | 4 Oct 1999 | Lionesses | | 300 |
| 35 | 4 Oct 1999 | Lion & Lioness | | 300 |
| 36 | 4 Oct 1999 | Lioness With Cubs | | 300 |
| 37 | 4 Oct 1999 | Two Lions | | 1500 |
| * | | Universal Postal Union - Rural Arts & Crafts Traditional, (Set of 4 Stamps) | | |
| 38 | 9 Oct 1999 | Rathva Wall Paintings | | 300 |
| 39 | 9 Oct 1999 | Muria Ritual object | | 300 |
| 40 | 9 Oct 1999 | Chhau Mask | | 300 |
| 41 | 9 Oct 1999 | Angami Ornaments | | 1500 |
| * | | India's March Towards Progress and Development, (Set of 4 Stamps) | | |
| 42 | 9 Oct 1999 | Dr. T. M. A. Pai | | 300 |
| 43 | 9 Oct 1999 | A. D. Shroff | | 300 |
| 44 | 9 Oct 1999 | A. B. Walawalkar | | 300 |
| 45 | 9 Oct 1999 | Chhaganlal K. Parekh | | 300 |
| 46 | 16 Oct 1999 | Veerapandiya Kattabomman | | 300 |
| * | | Modern Masters of Indian Classical Music, (Set of 2 Stamps) | | |
| 47 | 19 Oct 1999 | Ustad Allauddin Khan Saheb | | 300 |
| 48 | 19 Oct 1999 | Musiri Subramania Iyer | | 300 |
| 49 | 27 Oct 1999 | Brigadier Rajinder Singh, MVC | | 300 |
| 50 | 14 Nov 1999 | Children's Day | | 300 |
| 51 | 23 Nov 1999 | Sri Sathya Sai Water Supply Project | | 300 |
| 52 | 26 Nov 1999 | Supreme Court of India : Golden Jubilee | | 300 |
| * | | Freedom Fighters and Social Reformers, (Set of 4 Stamps) | | |
| 53 | 9 Dec 1999 | A. Vaidyanatha Iyer | | 300 |
| 54 | 9 Dec 1999 | Indulal Kanaiyalal Yagnik | | 300 |
| 55 | 9 Dec 1999 | Dr. Punjabrao Deshmukh | | 300 |
| 56 | 9 Dec 1999 | P. Kakkan | | 300 |
| 57 | 14 Dec 1999 | Thermal Power Centenary | | 300 |
| 58 | 16 Dec 1999 | The Hindustan Times | | 1500 |
| 59 | 18 Dec 1999 | Family Planning Association of India | | 300 |
| 60 | 25 Dec 1999 | Jesus Christ Jayanti 2000 | | 300 |
| 64 | 31 Dec 1999 | Tabo Monastery (Se-tenant) | | 500, 1000 |

== 2000 ==
| # | Issue date | Description | Image | Denomination |
|---|---|---|---|---|
| 1 | 01 Jan 2000 | First Sunrise of the Millennium | | 300 |
| 2 | 1 Jan 2000 | DRDO Agni II | | 300 |
| 3 | 27 Jan 2000 | Mahatma Gandhi : Father of the Nation-50 Years of the Republic of India | | 300 |
| * | | 50 Years of the Republic of India Gallantry Award Winners, (Set of 4 Stamps) | | |
| 4 | 28 Jan 2000 | Karam Singh, PVC | | 300 |
| 5 | 28 Jan 2000 | Abdul Hamid, PVC | | 300 |
| 6 | 28 Jan 2000 | Albert Ekka, PVC | | 300 |
| 7 | 28 Jan 2000 | N. J. S. Sekhon, PVC | | 300 |
| 8 | 28 Jan 2000 | M. N. Mulla, MVC | | 300 |
| * | | MILIPEX-2000 - Endangered Species : Turtles, (Se-tenant) | | |
| 9 | 29 Jan 2000 | Batagur | | 300 |
| 10 | 29 Jan 2000 | olive ridley | | 300 |
| * | | Personalities : Socio-Political, (Set of 3 Stamps) | | |
| 11 | 17 Feb 2000 | Balwantrai Mehta | | 300 |
| 12 | 17 Feb 2000 | Dr. Harekrushna Mahtab | | 300 |
| 13 | 17 Feb 2000 | Arun Kumar Chanda | | 300 |
| 14 | 26 Feb 2000 | Patna Medical College | | 300 |
| 15 | 13 Mar 2000 | Dr. Burgula Ramakrishna Rao | | 300 |
| 16 | 16 Mar 2000 | Potti Sriramulu | | 300 |
| 17 | 23 Mar 2000 | Basawon Sinha | | 300 |
| * | | Natural Heritage of Manipur and Tripura, Indepex Asiana - 2000, (Set of 4 Stamps) | | |
| 18 | 31 Mar 2000 | Siroi lily | | 300 |
| 19 | 31 Mar 2000 | sangai deer | | 300 |
| 20 | 31 Mar 2000 | wild guava | | 300 |
| 21 | 31 Mar 2000 | slow loris | | 1500 |
| 22 | 5 Apr 2000 | Arya Samaj | | 300 |
| * | | Indigenous Breeds of Cattle, (Set of 4 Stamps) | | |
| 23 | 25 Apr 2000 | Gir | | 300 |
| 24 | 25 Apr 2000 | Kankrej | | 300 |
| 25 | 25 Apr 2000 | Kangayam | | 300 |
| 26 | 25 Apr 2000 | Hallikar | | 1500 |
| 27 | 6 May 2000 | Hundred Years of Railways in Doon Valley | | 1500 |
| * | | Migratory birds Indepex Asiana:2000, (Set of 4 Stamps) | | |
| 28 | 24 May 2000 | rosy pastor | | 300 |
| 29 | 24 May 2000 | garganey teal | | 300 |
| 30 | 24 May 2000 | forest wagtail | | 300 |
| 31 | 24 May 2000 | white stork | | 300 |
| 32 | 28 May 2000 | N. T. Rama Rao | | 300 |
| 33 | 26 Jun 2000 | Swami Sahajanand Saraswati | | 300 |
| 34 | 12 Aug 2000 | Christian Medical College & Hospital, Vellore | | 300 |
| * | | Great Leaders : Social and Political, (Set of 4 Stamps) | | |
| 35 | 15 Aug 2000 | Vijaya Lakshmi Pandit | | 300 |
| 36 | 15 Aug 2000 | Rettamalai Srinivasan | | 300 |
| 37 | 15 Aug 2000 | Jaglal Choudhary | | 300 |
| 38 | 15 Aug 2000 | Radha Gobinda Baruah | | 300 |
| 39 | 26 Aug 2000 | Kodaikanal International School Centenary | | 1500 |
| * | | XXVII Olympics, (Set of 4 Stamps) | | |
| 40 | 17 Sept 2000 | Discus | | 300 |
| 41 | 17 Sept 2000 | Tennis | | 600 |
| 42 | 17 Sept 2000 | Hockey | | 1000 |
| 43 | 17 Sept 2000 | Weightlifting | | 1500 |
| * | | India in Space, (Set of 4 Stamps) | | |
| 44 | 29 Sept 2000 | India in Space - Oceansat-1 | | 300 |
| 45 | 29 Sept 2000 | INSAT 3B in Oribt | | 300 |
| 46 | 29 Sept 2000 | India in Space (Se-tenant) | | 300 each |
| * | | Madhubani - Mithila, (Set of 5 Stamps) | | |
| 47 | 15 Oct 2000 | Krishna With Gopies | | 300 |
| 48 | 15 Oct 2000 | Flower Girls | | 300 |
| 49 | 15 Oct 2000 | Bali & Sugriva | | 300 |
| 50 | 15 Oct 2000 | Lotus Plant Motif, ‘Kohbar-Ghar’ Mural (Se-tenant) | | 500, 1000 |
| 51 | 16 Oct 2000 | Raj Kumar Shukla | | 300 |
| 52 | 17 Oct 2000 | Dr. Shankar Dayal Sharma | | 300 |
| 53 | 14 Nov 2000 | Children's Day | | 300 |
| 54 | 16 Nov 2000 | Maharaja Bijli Pasi | | 300 |
| * | | Gems and Jewellery Indepex Asiana:2000, (Set of 6 Stamps) | | |
| 55 | 7 Dec 2000 | Ancient India | | 300 |
| 56 | 7 Dec 2000 | Taxila | | 300 |
| 57 | 7 Dec 2000 | Sarpech | | 300 |
| 58 | 7 Dec 2000 | Navratna | | 300 |
| 59 | 7 Dec 2000 | Bridal | | 300 |
| 60 | 7 Dec 2000 | Temple | | 300 |
| 61 | 17 Dec 2000 | Maritime Heritage: Kunjali Marakkar - 400 Years | | 300 |
| 62 | 28 Dec 2000 | Ustad Hafiz Ali Khan | | 300 |
| * | | Personality Series : Historical, (Set of 4 Stamps) | | |
| 63 | 31 Dec 2000 | Prithviraj Chauhan | | 300 |
| 64 | 31 Dec 2000 | Raja Bhamashah | | 300 |
| 65 | 31 Dec 2000 | Rajarshi Bhagyachandra | | 300 |
| 66 | 31 Dec 2000 | General Zorawar Singh | | 300 |
