= P. S. Kumaraswamy Raja =

Indian politician (1898–1957)

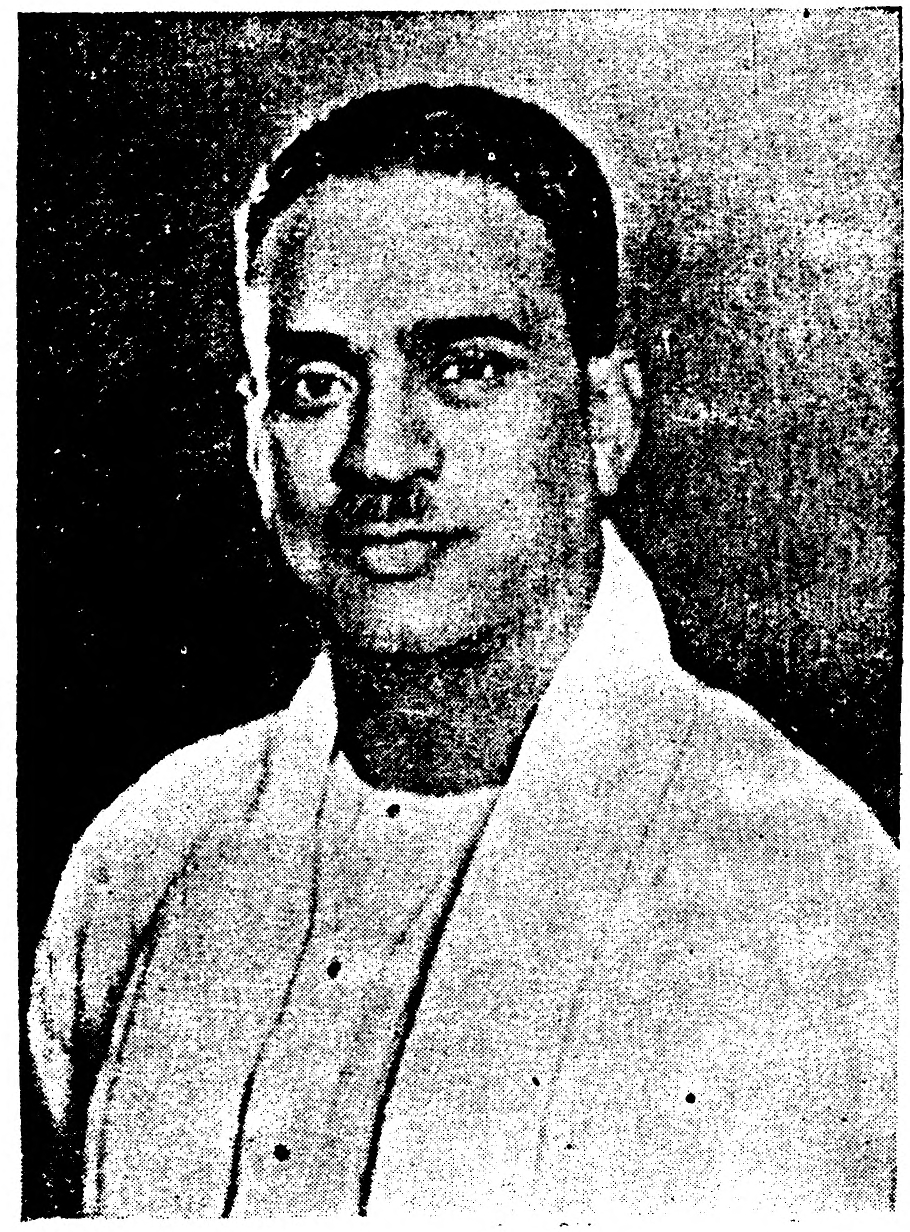
- P. S. Kumaraswamy Raja

4th Governor of Orissa
- In office 10 February 1954 – 11 September 1956
- Chief Minister: Nabakrushna Choudhuri
- Preceded by: Saiyid Fazl Ali
- Succeeded by: Bhim Sen Sachar

1st Chief Minister of Madras State
- In office 26 January 1950 – 9 April 1952
- Governor: Krishna Kumarasingh Bhavasingh
- Preceded by: Position established
- Succeeded by: C. Rajagopalachari
- Constituency: Leader of Madras State Legislative Council

5th Premier of Madras Presidency
- In office 6 April 1949 – 26 January 1950
- Governor: Krishna Kumarasingh Bhavasingh
- Preceded by: O. P. Ramaswamy Reddiyar
- Succeeded by: Position abolished

Personal details
- Born: Poosapati Sanjeevi Kumarswamy Raja; 8 July 1898 Rajapalayam, Madras Presidency, British India (present-day Tamil Nadu, India)
- Died: 16 March 1957 (aged 58) Madras, Madras State, India (present-day Chennai, Tamil Nadu)
- Party: Indian National Congress
- Profession: Politician

Poosapati Sanjeevi Kumaraswamy Raja (8 July 1898 – 16 March 1957) was an Indian politician who served as the last Premier of Madras Presidency from 6 April 1949 to 26 January 1950 and first Chief Minister of Madras State from 26 January 1950 to 10 April 1952 and Governor of Orissa from 1954 till 1956. He was born in Rajapalayam in Tamil Nadu. .

== Early life ==
Raja was born on 8 July 1898 in Rajapalayam to Poosapati Sanjeevi Raja. His mother died when he was eight days old and his father when he was three. Raja belonged to the Raju community, the ancestors of which migrated from the northern circars of Andhra Pradesh during the Vijayanagara rule in the Tamil Country. Raja had no brothers and sisters and was brought up by his grandmother. After schooling, Raja was connected with the Indian National Congress organisation at its every level. He took a prominent part in Panchayat organisations, local Board administration. He served as the President of Rajapalayam Union, the Panchayat court, the District Board of Ramnathapuram and the District educational Council among others. He was an uncle of military officer K.A.S. Raja. His great grandson Srimaan Ramachandra Raja currently serves as the All India Secretary of NSUI. The students wing of Indian National Congress and is a key figure for Tamil Nadu Congress committee.

== Political and social work ==
The lives and writings of Annie Besant and Satyamurthy had great influence on his mind and character in his formative years. It was in 1919 that he met Mahatma Gandhi for the first time and started following with great interest the events in Gandhi's life. Gandhi's epic struggle in South Africa, the founding of the Ashram in Ahmedabad and the Champaran struggle made a profound impression on him and the utter simplicity of Mahatma's life also evoked his unbounded admiration.

In 1932, he was arrested for disobeying the unjust laws. Thus Rajapalayam gained a distinct place in political map, the credit went to Raja's lead. In 1934, Raja won central legislature for Madura & Ramnad cum Tinnevelly General constituency comprising Tirunelveli, Madurai & Ramanathapuram. At the age of 39, he entered the Assembly as M.L.A in C. Rajagopalachari ministry successfully contesting the 1937 election.

He was elected as the leader of Madras Legislature Congress Party in 1939 defeating Dr. P. Subbaroyan by 105 to 89 in March 31, 1949 and took oath as the Premier (Prime Minister) of Madras Province on April 6, 1949. Prior to becoming the prime minister he served as a cabinet minister under Tanguturi Prakasam formed in April 1946. He also served as the Governor of Orissa from 1954 to 1956.

In all the years of his life, most of Raja's wealth was spent in helping the poor and in serving public causes, particularly for the Congress movement. He was much interested in co-operative movement also. He founded Bhupathi Raju Co-operative Credit Bank, an urban bank for the benefit of local people especially farmers named after his friend, Bhupathi Raju of Pusapati family in Andhra, who accompanied him in prison during freedom movement. He constructed the monument Congress Ponvizha Grounds (Golden Jubilee Grounds) in Rajapalayam commemorating the fifty years completion of founding of All India Congress Party in 1935.

Raja's life was one of noble activity, dedication and selfless service for the people of the country. He was a staunch proponent of the concept of "Separation of the Judiciary from the Executive". Prohibition, promotion of Khādī and Temple entry legislation were his other notable achievements. He donated his house for starting an institution of culture called "Gandhi Kalai Mandram". Rajapalayam became a great industrial centre mainly due to his drive and interest.

It was said that Raja studied in Srivilliputtur G.S. Hindu Higher Secondary School and thus he chose his temple as the symbol of Tamil Nadu emblem. And his successor Rajagopalachari might not have minded that the shrine of Andal was now the Madras government's symbol.

Raja died on 16 March 1957 in Madras, upon not recovering from an illness following his return from a visit to his ancestral village near Vizianagaram in Andhra Pradesh.

== Commemoration ==
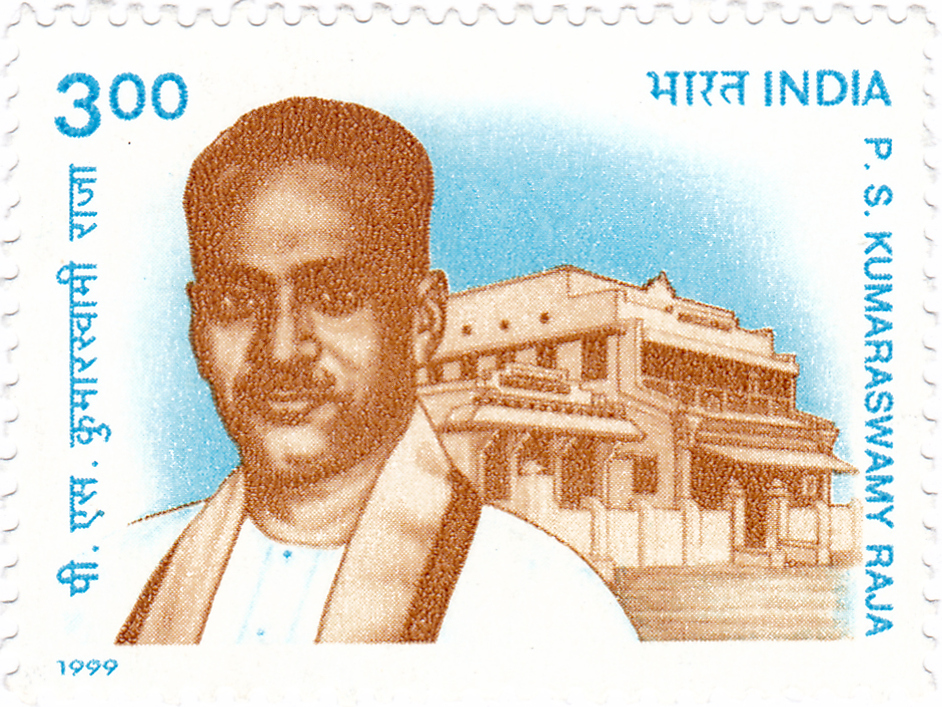
1999 stamp of India

Raja has been commemorated on an India Post stamp released on 8 July 1999. P. S. Kumaraswamy Raja centenary marriage hall was opened in 1998 by then chief minister to commemorate his centenary birthday celebrations.

== See also ==
- List of Chief Ministers of Tamil Nadu

Political offices
Preceded by O. P. Ramaswamy Reddiyar	Prime Minister of Madras Presidency; 6 April 1949 – 26 January 1950	Post abolished
Post created	Chief Minister of Madras State; 26 January 1950 – 9 April 1952	Succeeded by C. Rajagopalachari
Government offices
Preceded by Fazl Ali	Governor of Orissa; 10 February 1954 – 11 September 1956	Succeeded by Bhim Sen Sachar
