= Paralakhemundi =

- Town; Municipality
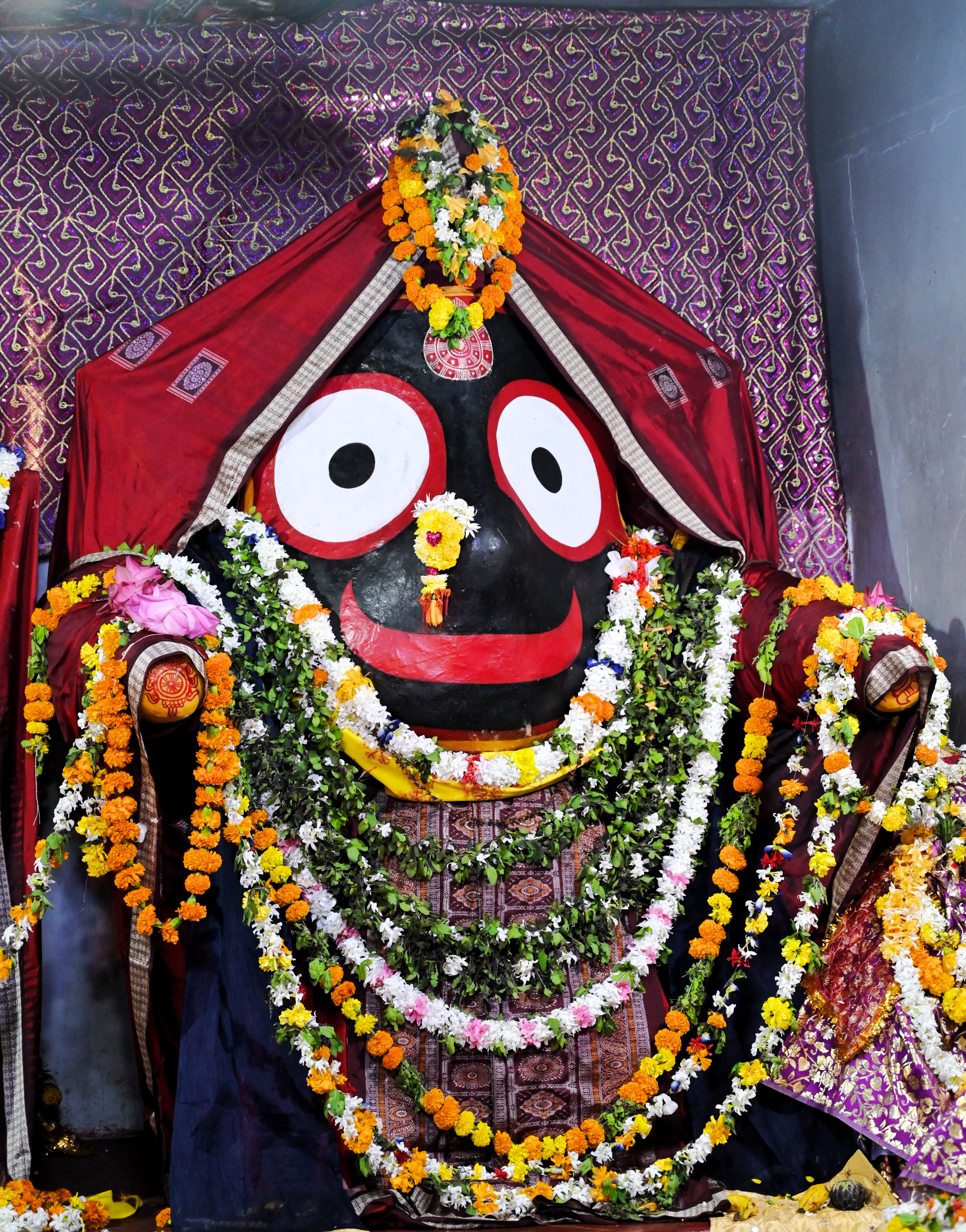
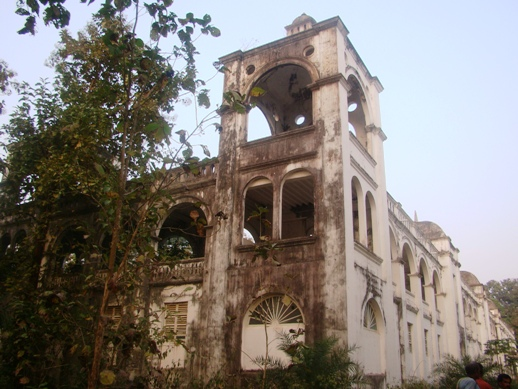
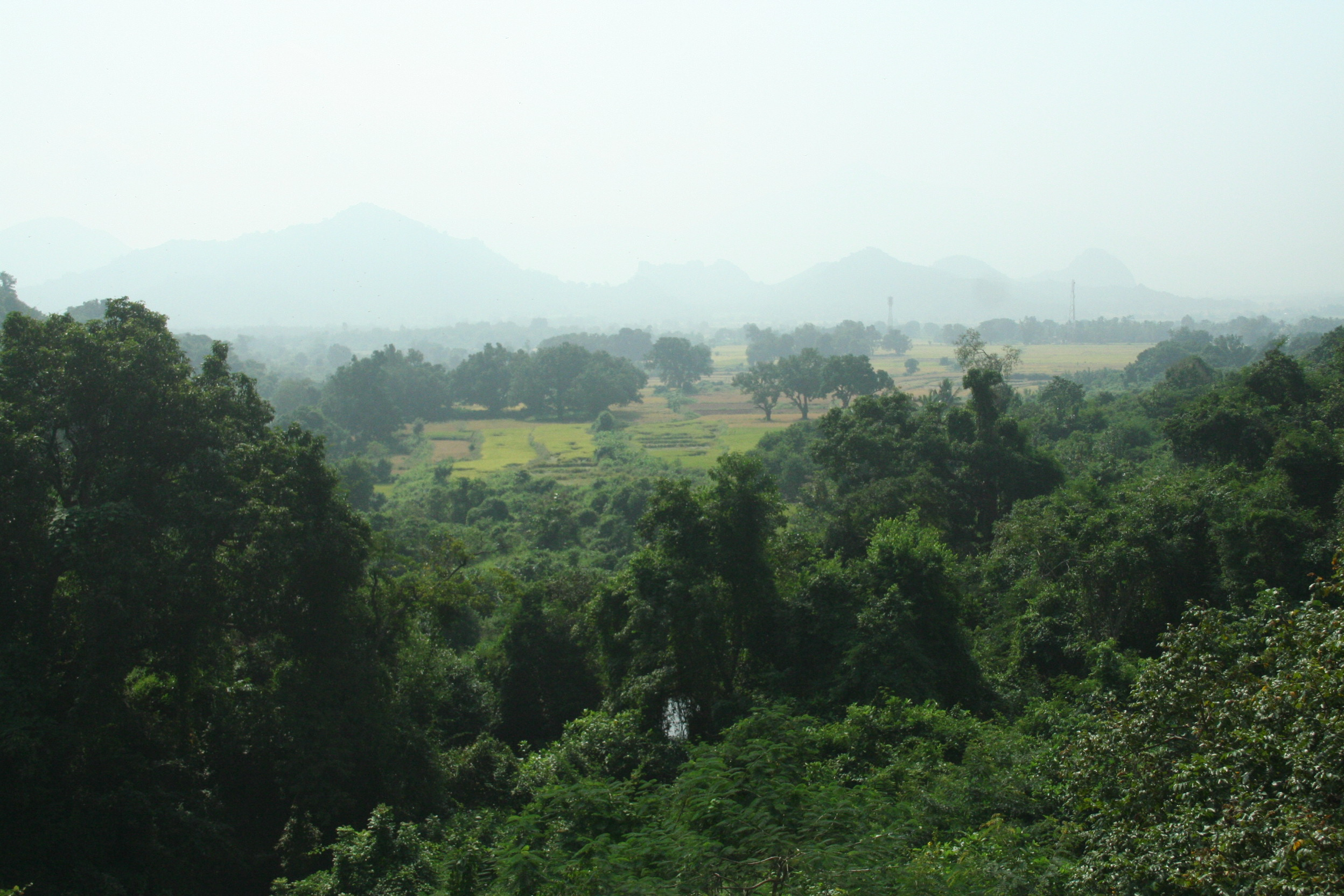
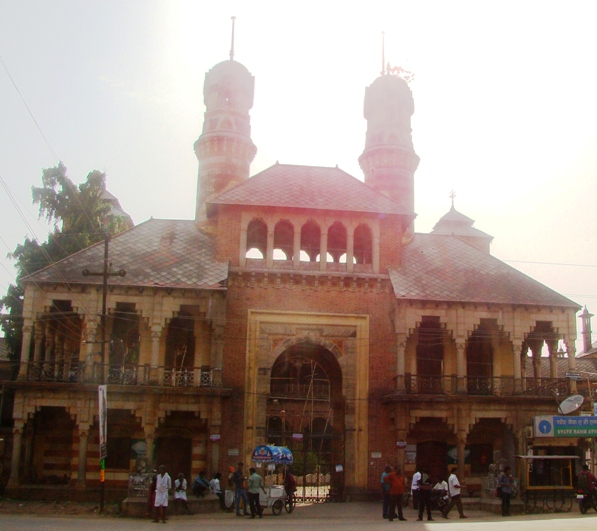
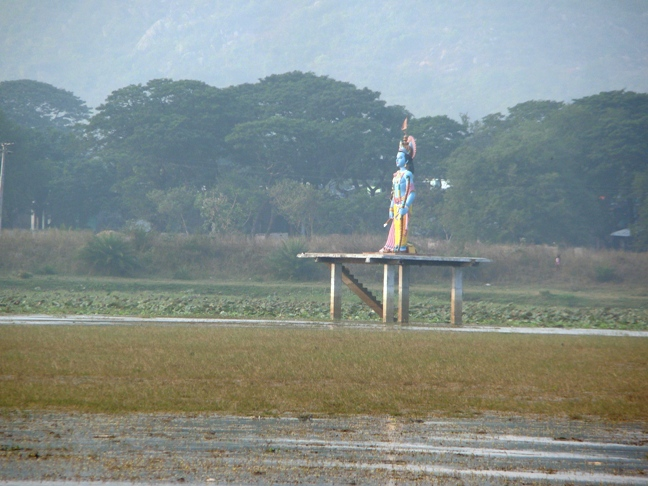
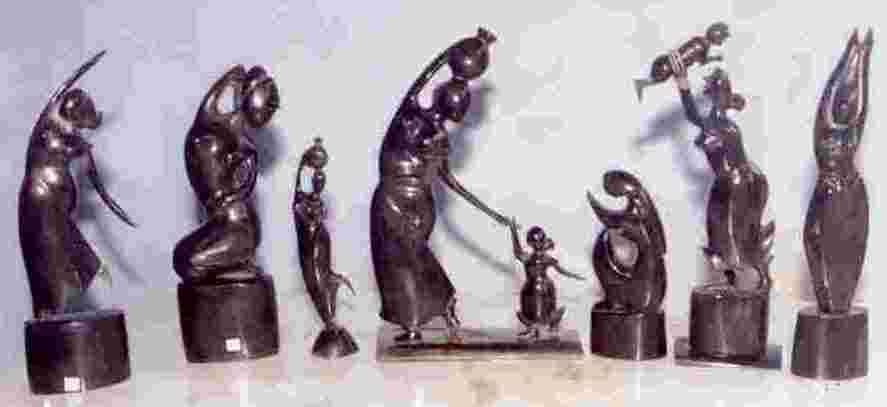
- From Top; Left to Right: Ancient Jagannatha deity of Paralakhemundi, Brundaban Palace Gajapati Palace, Famous Horn Craft of Paralakhemundi, Ram Sagar, Hills in Paralakhemundi

- Location in Odisha, India Paralakhemundi (India) Paralakhemundi (Asia) Paralakhemundi (Earth)
- Coordinates: 18°46′41.149″N 84°5′35.97″E
- Country: India
- State: Odisha
- District: Gajapati
- Established: August 17, 1885; 141 years ago
- Founder: Kolahomee
- Named for: Prabalakhanda (lit. ''piece of Coral''

Government
  - Type: Municipality
  - Body: Paralakhemundi Municipality

Area
  - Total: 21.4 km^{2} (8.3 sq mi)
- Elevation: 145 m (476 ft)

Population (2025)
  - Total: 51,181
  - Density: 2,390/km^{2} (6,190/sq mi)

Languages
  - Official: Odia
- Time zone: UTC+5:30 (IST)
- PIN: 761200
- Telephone code: 06815
- Vehicle registration: OD-20

Paralakhemundi shortly known as Parala is district Headquarter of Gajapati district and one of the oldest Municipality established in 1885, in the Indian state of Odisha. The city and the district share its boundaries with Andhra Pradesh. The adjacent town of Pathpatnam is separated by the River Mahendra Tanaya. In later medieval period it became capital of Paralakhemundi Estate of Eastern Ganga dynasty kings of Khemundi Branch. The town is well known for being an ancient cultural center of Odisha and birthplace of noted personalities including poet Gopalakrusna Pattanayaka, statesman Krushna Chandra Gajapati Narayan Deo, lexicographer Gopinatha Nanda Sharma and historian Satyanarayana Rajguru. This town is also known for its century old temples, monasteries, palaces and heritage buildings. Odia is spoken language in the town and villages

== Demographics ==
As of 2011 India census, Paralakhemundi had a population of 48,990. Males constitute 51% of the population and females 49%. Paralakhemundi has an average literacy rate of 69%, lower than the national average of 74.04%: male literacy is 77%, and female literacy is 61%. In Paralakhemundi, 11% of the population is under 6 years of age.

Paralakhemundi has a population of 51,181 in the year 2025. Majority of the people are Hindu; Christians being the second largest religious community.

== History ==
Paralakhemundi is an ancient estate lying in the western corner of the southern portion of then larger Ganjam district (now constitute Ganjam district, Gajapati district, Srikakulam district and parts of Vizianagaram district), and it is bounded in the west by the district of then larger Visakhapatnam district (now constitute Visakhapatnam district, Koraput district, Malkangiri district, Rayagada district, parts of Vizianagaram district) and on the north by the Jeypore state and the eastern ghats which are called Maliyas or tribal agencies. The town of Paralakhemundi is: "a straggling town in plan much like the letter ‘L’ scattered around the foot of the well wooded hill which is the distinctive feature of the place. The horizontal portion of the ‘L’ faces south, and at the corner where the ‘L’ and the vertical portion join, is situated the palace(Gajapati Palace), a most picturesque group of building". This group of buildings was designed and built by Mr. Chisholm.

The Khemundi country, consisting of Paralakhemundi, Badakhemundi and Sanakhemundi, was under a single ruler till 1607. Paralakhemundi came under British influence in 1768. In the present day, several families tracing their descent from former ruling houses continue to reside in the Parlakhemundi region alongside the Ganga royal family of Parlakhemundi. Notable among them are the Bahubalendra Deva Rai family of Machamara, the Jenamani and Deo families of Pathapatnam, and branches of the Suryavamshi and Bahubalendra (junior line) families in Gunupur.

Paralakhemundi owes much of its present-day existence to Sri Krushna Chandra Gajapati Narayan Deo. Krushna Chandra Gajapati Narayan Deo, Maharaja of Paralakhemundi of the Gajapati kingdom, was the direct descendant of the historic dynasty of the Eastern Ganga dynasty Gajapati kings that ruled Odisha for more than seven centuries. During the regime of these kings, the boundaries of the dynasty was extended from the Ganges in the North to Udayagiri, Nellore district in the South. Kolahomee, one of the sons of Gajapati Kapilendra Dev, the Gajapati monarch in the later half of the 15th century came to this part of Paralakhemundi (then in Ganjam district) and founded the royal family of Paralakhemundi.

Gajapati district has been named after Maharaja Sri Krushna Chandra Gajapati Narayan Dev, the Raja Sahib of Paralakhemundi estate. He was honoured as the 1st Prime Minister of the State of Odisha after it was created on 1 April 1936, remembered for his contribution in the formation of a separate Odisha State and inclusion of Paralakhemundi estate in Odisha. Gajapati district came into being with effect from 2 October 1992. Prior to this it was a part (Sub-Division) of Ganjam district.

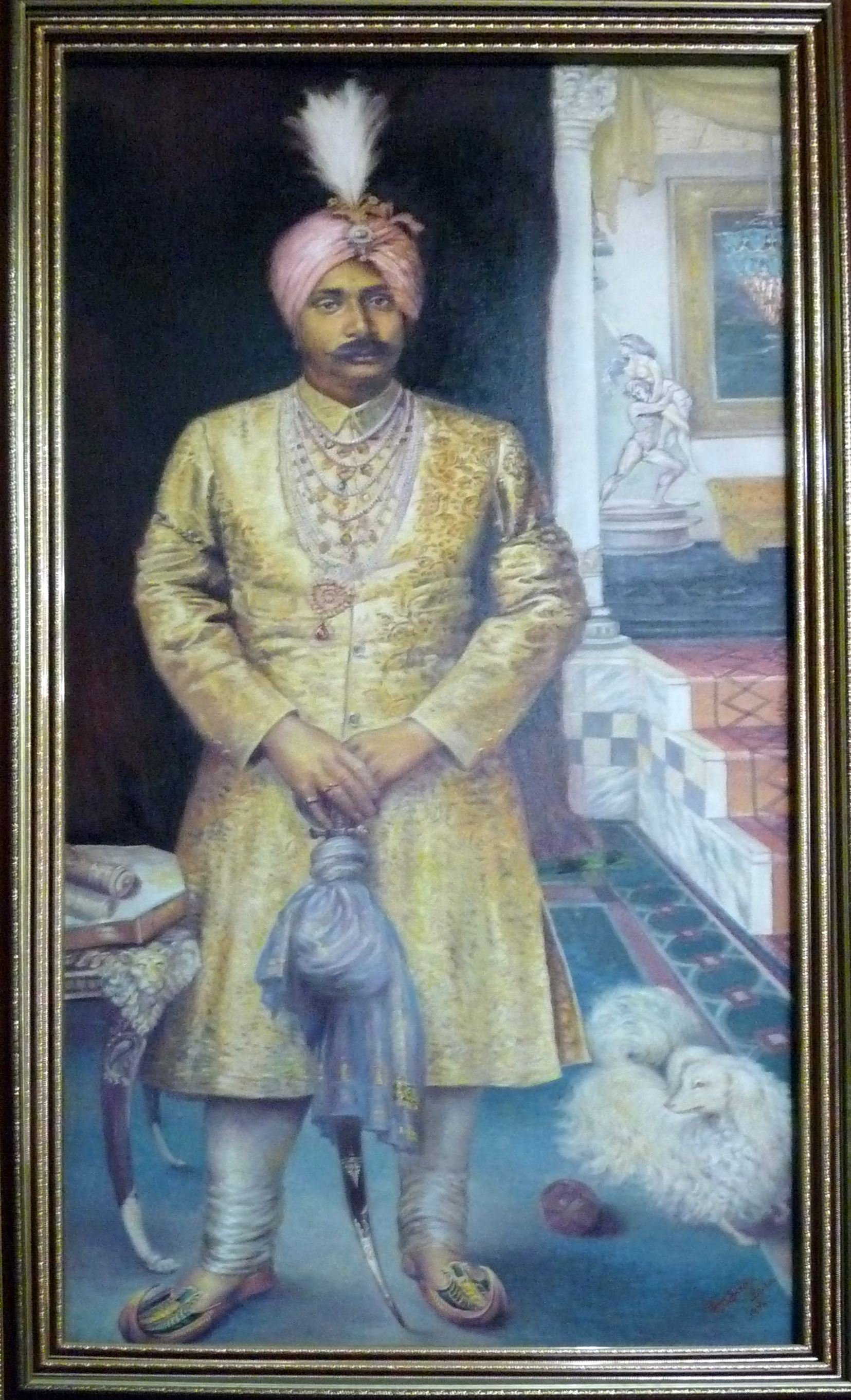
Maharaja Krushna Chandra Gajapati Narayan Deo

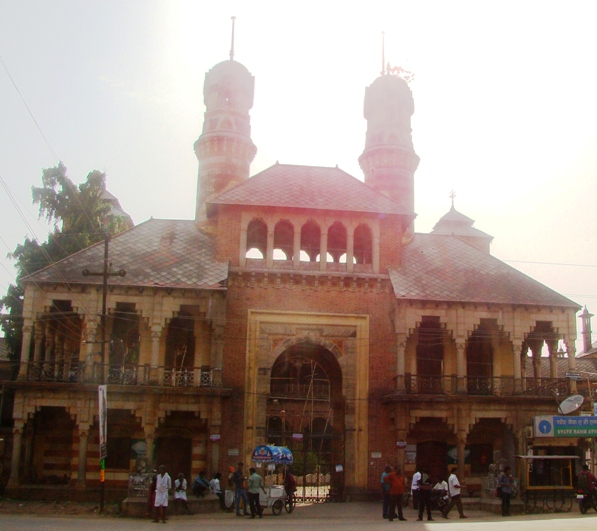
Iconic Gajapati palace

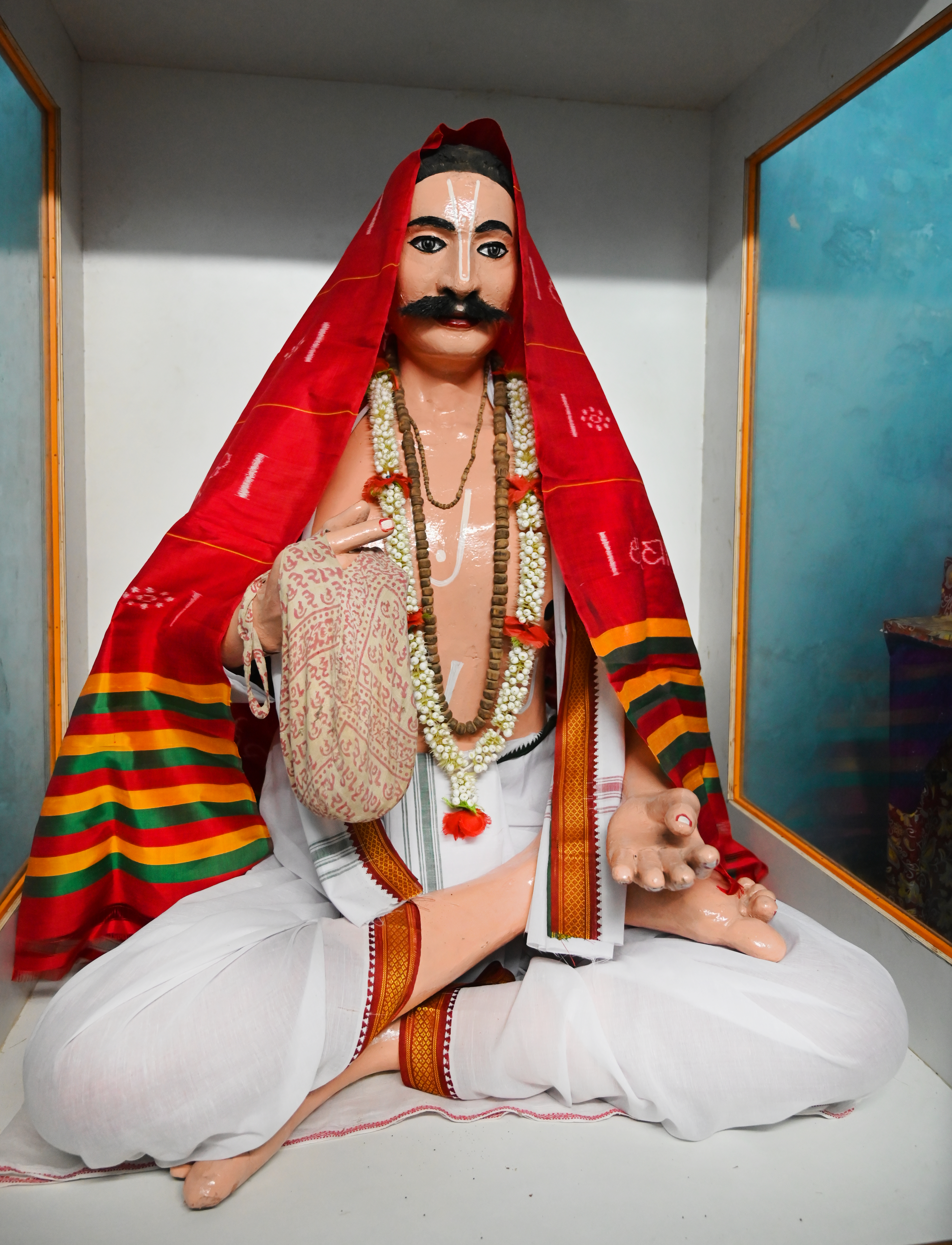
Kabi Kalahansa Gopalakrusna Pattanayaka, 18th-century composer of Odissi music

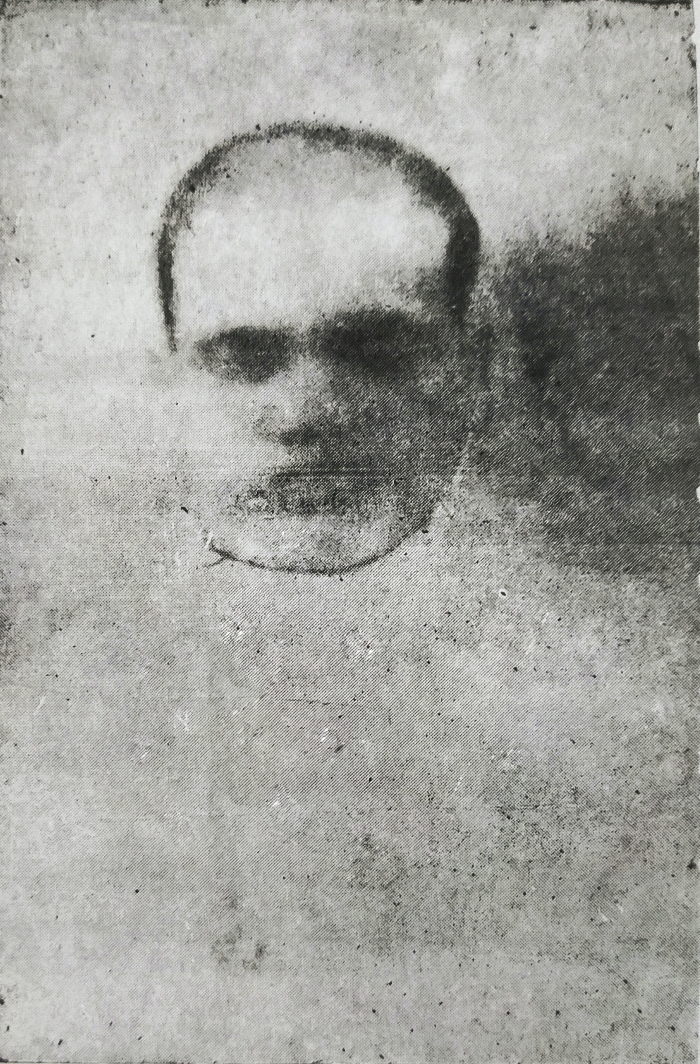
Gayaka Siromani Apanna Panigrahi, Odissi music and Bina maestro

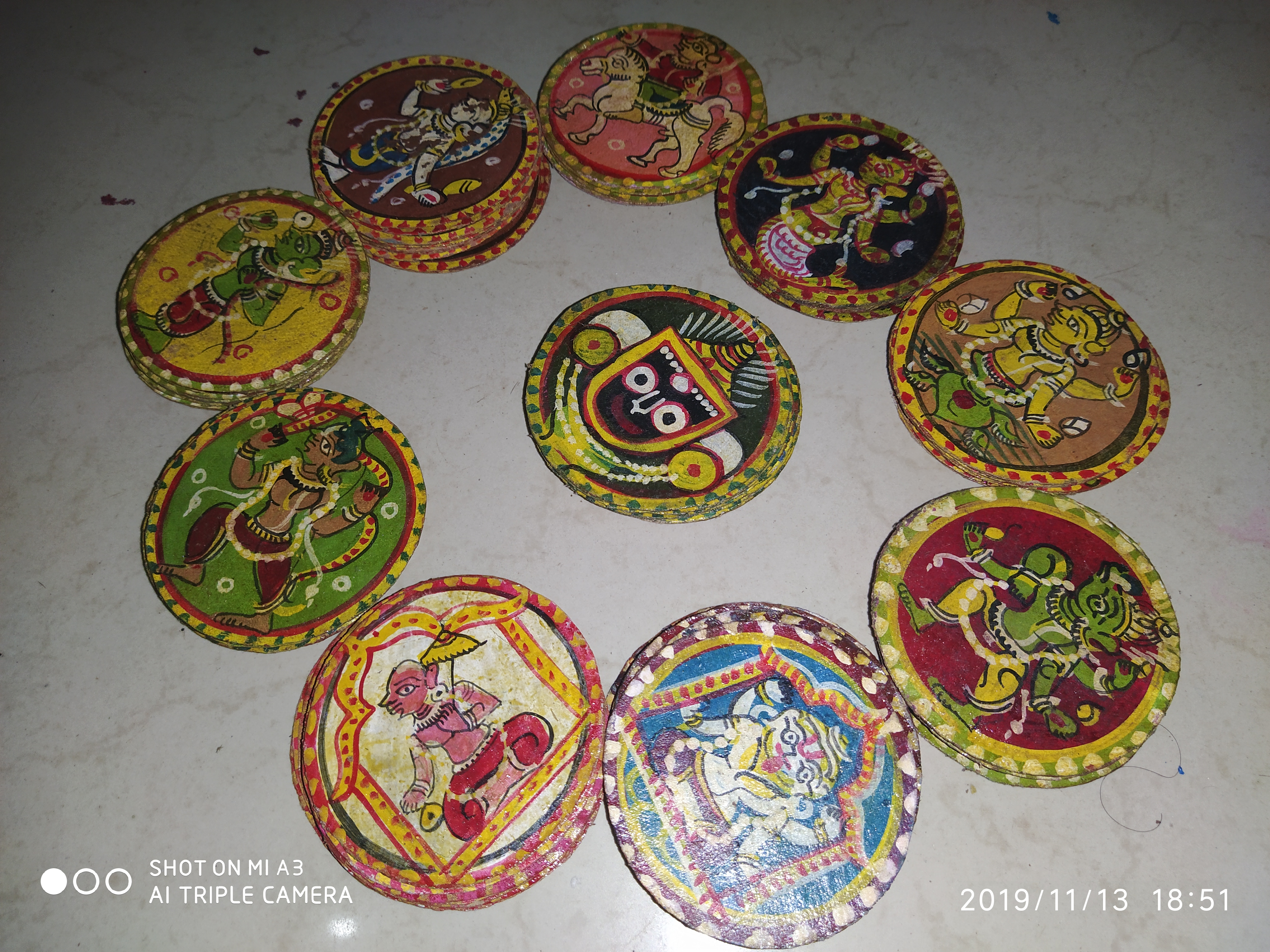
Dasabatara Ganjapa cards made in the Pattachitra style of Paralakhemundi

The Eastern Ganga dynasty (Gajapatis) of Paralakhemundi

Crowned King	Period of Rule	Siblings & commanders
Sibalinga Narayan Bhanudeo	(1566–1590)	Hari Sankar raula
Subarna Kesari Govinda Gajapati Narayan Deo	(1590–1630)
Mukunda Rudra Gajapati Narayan Deo	(1630–1656)
Mukunda Deo	(1656–1674)
Annanta Padmanabh Gajapati Narayan Deo 1st	(1674–1702)
Sarbajgan Jagannatha Gajapati Narayan Deo 1st	(1686–1702)
Narahari Naraya Deo	(1702–1729)	Jannardan Deo, Guntta Narayana Deo, Yoshabanta Deo
Bira Padmanabha Narayana Deo 2nd	(1729–1748*)	Prataprudra Deo, Narasinga Deo
Prataprudra Gajapati Narayan Deo 1st	(1748–1751*)	Narasinga Deo
Jagannath Gajapati Narayana Deo 2nd (Adopted Son of Padmanabha Gajapati Narayan Deo, Adopted by Prataparudra Gajapati Narayan Deo)	(1751–1770)
Goura Chandra Gajapati Narayana Deo 1st	(1771 – 20 January 1802)
Purushottama Gajapati Narayana Deo	(4 February 1802 – 29 October 1805)	Chatrapati Deo
Jagannatha Gajapati Narayana Deo 3rd	(1821* – 27 November 1851)
Prataparudra Gajapati Narayana Deo 2nd (took retirement before his death)	(1851–1885)	Harikrushan Deo, Rajarajeswar Deo
Gourachandra Gajapati Narayan Deo 2nd	(1885–1904)	Purushottam Deo, Jagnnatha Deo, Padmanabha Narayan Deo
Gourachandra Gajapati Narayan Deo 2nd	(1904–1913) Court of Wards
Krushna Chandra Gajapati Narayan Deo	(1913 – 25.05.1974)	Anangabhima Deo
Krushna Chandra Gajapati Narayan Deo as 1st Prime Minister of Orissa	(01.04.1937 – 18.07.1937)
Ramachandra Deo (committed suicide)	(Not crowned)	Madhaba Sundar Deo
Gopinath Gajapati Narayan Deo	(25.05.1974 – 10.01.2020)	Sarbajgan Jagnnatha Deo, Late Udayabhanu
Gopinath Gajapati Narayan Deo as Member of Parliament of Berhampur	During 9th & 10th Lok Sabha
Late Digvijaya Gajapati Narayan Deo	(Not crowned)
Rani Kumari Kalyani devi (Daughter of Sri Gopinath Gajapati)	(10.01.2020–present)	Late Digvijaya Gajapati Narayan Deo

* Historical data unreliable
Extracted from the book "Paralakhemundi, Lekha O Lekhaka"

== Geography and climate ==
Paralakhemundi lies in the south-east of the east Indian state of Odisha. It is on the banks of Mahendratanaya river. Paralakhemundi borders with a town called Pathapatnam of Andhra Pradesh. The town is located on a hilly terrain.

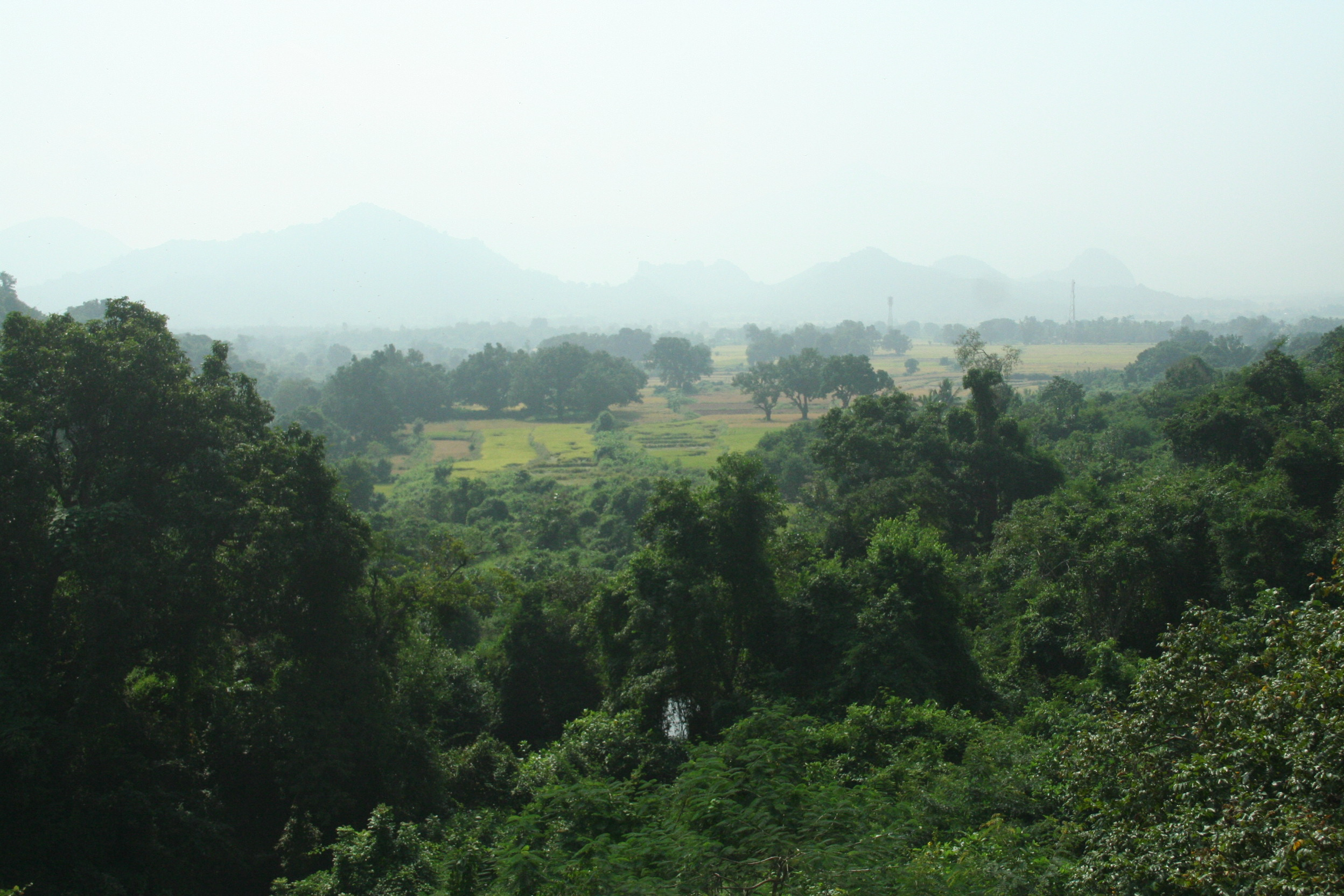
View of the hills from the town

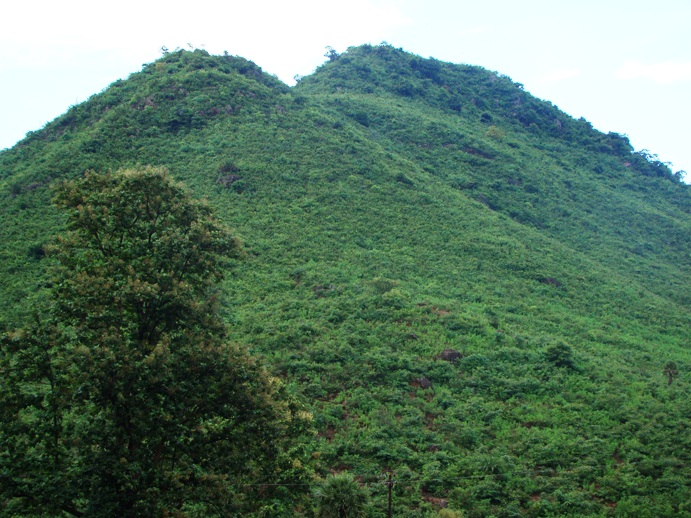
Hills near the college

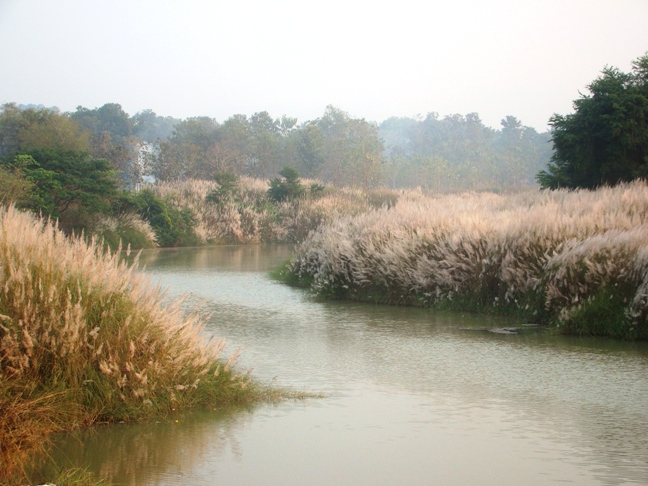
Mahendratanaya river

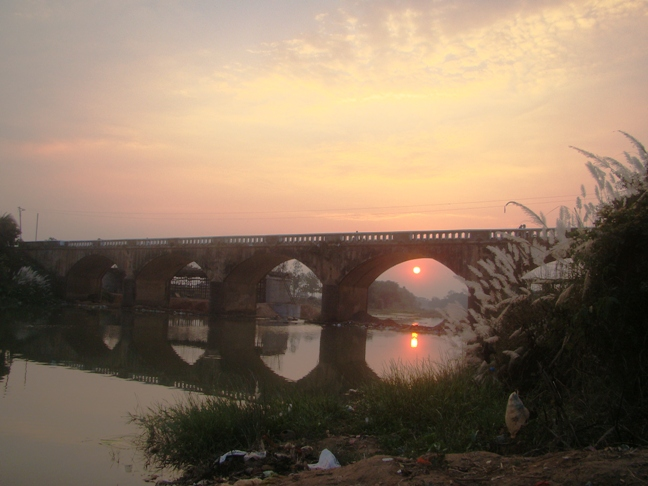
Bridge on Mahendratanaya river

The climate is subtropical with high humidity. The temperature varies between 18 and 48 degree Celsius. Summer is extremely hot with some thunderstorms and minor cyclones, which occasionally cause power outages. Paralakhemundi receives rainfall from the southwest monsoons and the wettest months are July, August and September.

== Education ==
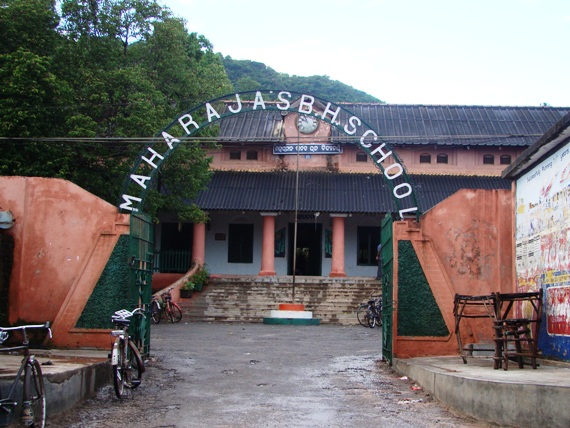
Maharaja Boys High School

The town of Paralakhemundi has many educational institutions. Some institutes have been there for over 100 years. These were initiated under the erstwhile rulers of the princely state. Maharaja Boys High School (1857), Maharaja Girls High School (1919) are the ones operational even today. The rulers of yesteryear understood the importance of education and promoted education of the girl child about a hundred years ago. The SKCG Autonomous College, Paralakhemundi, named after the illustrious Sri Krushna Chandra Gajapati, enjoys the reputation of being the second oldest college of the state after the Revenshaw College of Cuttack. It has affiliation in almost all major disciplines in the faculties of Arts, Science and commerce. From the session 1996–97, P.G. Courses in Mathematics has been added to the already existing post-graduate teaching facilities in Economics, Chemistry, Oriya, Commerce and Life Sciences. Besides teaching facilities for Honours courses in Mathematics, Physics, Chemistry, Botany, Zoology, Computer Applications, English, Oriya, Sanskrit, Geography, history, Political Science and Economics, the college also offers teaching in subjects like Telugu, Hindi, Logic, Philosophy and Home Science. The Indira Gandhi National Open University has opened a center in this college. The college has a sanctioned strength of 2016 students and 83 faculty positions. The alumni of this college occupied and continue to occupy positions of distinction and pride in public life. The college celebrated its centenary from 10 to 12 January 2001.

The Women's' College, Paralakhemundi was established in the year 1983 and was initially affiliated to Berhampur University for IA (Intermediate in Arts) course. Later it was affiliated to the Council of Higher secondary Education, Odisha, Bhubaneswar for the +2 Arts Course. The college came under G.I.A. fold since 1988. The college has received Permanent recognition from Government in the year 2003–2004.The college was included in u/s @ 2(f) and 12(B) Act of the U.G.C. from 2006 to 2007.

There is a Teacher's Training Institute in the town that trains and graduates teachers. It helps in imparting training on the latest methodologies of teaching to the Teachers of Primary and Upper Primary Schools. It also provides CT Training to prospective students on Teaching and certifies the apprenticeship expertise.

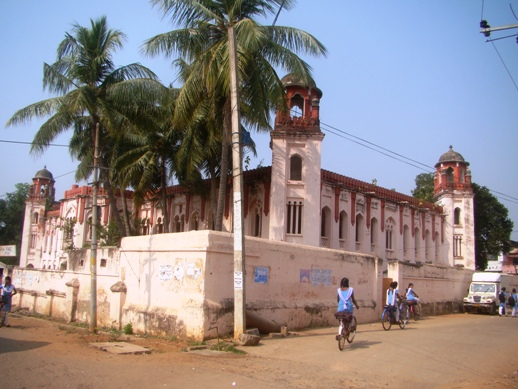
Maharaja Girls High School

Jagannath Institute for Technology and Management (JITM) was established in the year 1997. The institute was set up with the aim to bring technical education to the rural areas and produce highly skilled technical personnel for various sectors in the industry. The institute has been rechristened as Centurion University of Technology and Management (CUTM) recently. Students from all over Odisha and neighbouring states like Andhra Pradesh, Bihar and Jharkhand are studying in this institute, which provides Agriculture, Fisheries, Engineering and Management degrees.

Sanskrit college is one of the oldest colleges in Paralakhemundi. It is affiliated to Puri Sanskrit University. Students here learn the ancient language of Sanskrit and thus help in keeping the language alive and making it relevant in today's context. Several other private-public partnered colleges have come up recently in the town and in the periphery of the town. MBA Degree College, Law College, Nursing College, Sri Ram College Kasinagar are a few of them.

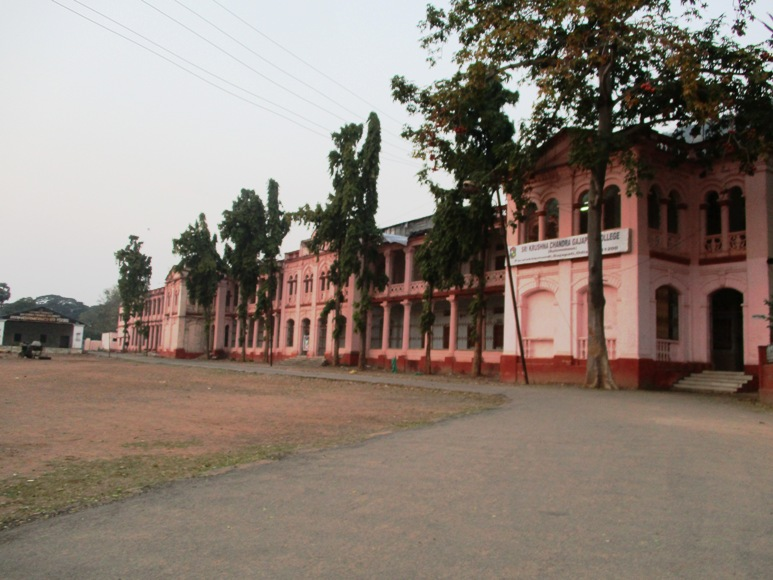
SKCG College

There are several primary, upper primary and high schools in the town. Some of the prominent schools are MRBH, MRGH, Mahendra Giri High School, Gandhi School, Apanna Paricha School, Goura Chandra School. Some of the prominent private schools are the Saraswati Sishu Mandir, Sri Arabinda Purnanga Sikhya Kendra, Priyadarshini Convent School, Sri Satya Sai School. The town also has a Jawahar Navodaya Vidyalaya and a Kendriya Vidyalaya set-up by the ministry of HRD, Central Union Government.

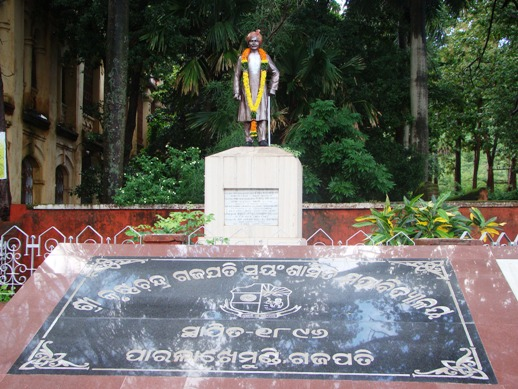
SKCG College Entrance

== Civic administration ==
The Paralakhemundi Municipality is in charge of the civic administration of the town. As the headquarters of the Gajapati district, it houses several district-level headquarters of government and private organizations.

== Economy ==
Paralakhemundi is situated among the Eastern Ghats where there are vast plains and number of small streams and rivers. This has enabled cultivation as the chief source of income here. People cultivate mainly paddy (rice), which is grown twice-a-year in the fields, once during Kharif and once during Rabi seasons. However many farmers also cultivate cash crops like sugarcane, maize, and tobacco. Some even cultivate long term cash crops like mango plantations, cashew, banana, etc. The latest trend is that farmers are getting inclined to grow cotton in their fields, which apparently is more profitable to them. Apart from Cultivation and Industries related to cultivation like Rice Mills, Mango Pulp Factories, Cashew Factories, Rice Flake Industries, Sugar Mill, the town is poorly industrialized. However, some medium scale granite factories have been set-up in the surroundings of the town. The other source of income of the residents is through the Handicrafts that are made by them, which they are learning traditionally from generation to generation. The economy is sustainable but is not flourishing due to lack of industrialization and exposure to bigger markets.

== Transport ==
Paralakhemundi is connected to other parts of Odisha by the State Highway 4 (SH-4) which connects Berhampur at one end and Rayagada on the other. The National Highway 326A passes through the village, which connects Mohana in Odisha with Narasannapeta of Andhra Pradesh.

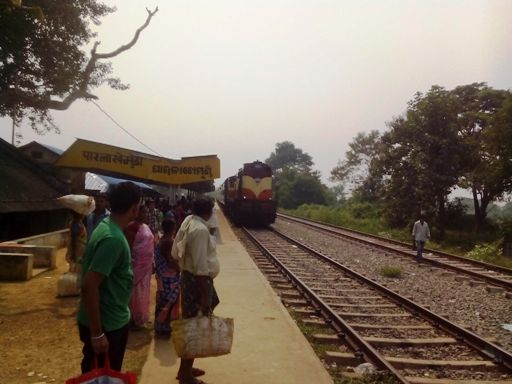
Paralakhemundi Railway Station

Parlakhemundi is connected to Naupada railway junction on the main East Coast railway line from Kolkata to Chennai by 90 km long (Gunpur to Naupada) 1676mm broad gauge line, that was converted from 762mm (2 ft 6 in) narrow gauge in 2010–11. The line was finally closed for gauge conversion on 9 June 2004. After conversion to broad gauge the Gunpur-Paralakhemundi-Naupada rail line was opened to public and from 21 August 2011.

== Art and culture ==
Historically Paralakhemundi is known as a place for art and artists. The princely rulers had the penchant of promoting and sponsoring the artists. Odissi musician-composers such as Kabikalahansa Gopalakrusna Pattanayaka (1785–1862) was born in the eighteenth century in Parlakhemundi. He was a contemporary of Kabisurjya Baladeba Ratha. His writings on the Krishna Leela like, ‘Brajaku Chora Asichhi’, ‘Uthilu Ede Begi Kahinkire’, ‘Mo Krushna Chandrama’, ‘Dukhidhana Chandranana’ etc. lyrical poems were depicting the expression of affection.

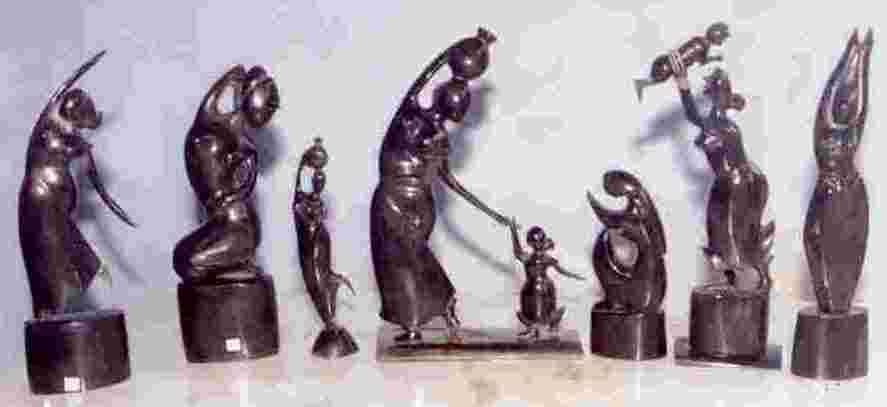
Horn Work of Paralakhemundi

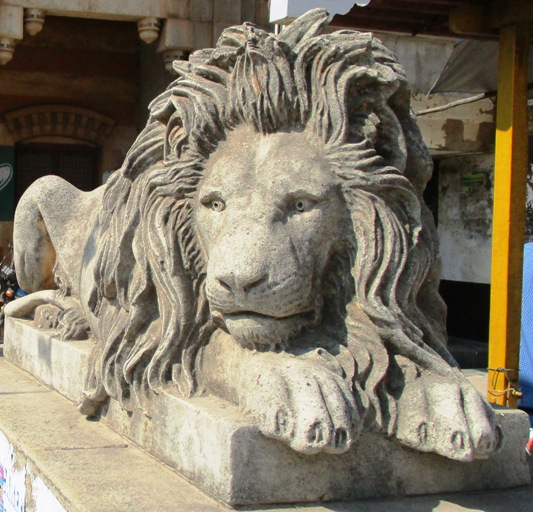
The Guarding Lion

Paralakhemundi is home to many arts & crafts. Horn-work is the oldest craft of Paralakhemundi. The artisans of this art are called Maharanas. These artisans are said to have migrated from a place called Pitala in Ganjam district under the patronage of the Maharaja of Gajapati, Krishna Chandra Deb. The hornwork items include figurines, birds, animals and scenes from Indian mythology. The Palace Street is known for its horn-work showrooms. The horn-works of Paralakhemundi were one of the important products of cottage industry. The horn-works of Paralakhemundi got a special place among the other craft works of Calcutta, Punjab, Kakinada and Trivandrum. The horn-works were made chiefly out of the horns of cattle which were supplied from the neighboring maliahs of the zamindari. The artists of Paralakhemundi first of all used to prepare birds from the horns. Gradually they prepared combs, elephants, horses, prawns, idols of Lord Jagannatha etc. The craft items are then sent to cities and art emporiums. The Horn-work artisans also have a Cooperative society that looks after the promotion and sales of their art work. These horn works are also popular in the international market.

The other craft that was known in the yester years was the Ivory-work. The artists of Paralakhemundi used to carve thrones, khatuli (cots) and other works out of ivory and bone. Forests in which a large number of elephants lived surrounded Paralakhemundi. Hence, ivory was plentifully available in Paralakhemundi. Sri. Radha Krushna Maharana and his son Sri. Purnachandra Maharana, Surendra Maharana and Bhaskara Maharana were experts in the field of ivory works during the British period.

Paralakhemundi is also known for crafts like the Jaikhadi bag, cane and bamboo work. The Chitrakar Sahi is famous for its clay, stone sculptures and water paintings. The chitrakara or painters could do wonders with their paint work. Some of the paint works include the Sculptures of Idols, Wall Painting, Fabric Painting, Painted Playing Cards, Paper Masks, Embossed Paper Idols and Souvenirs. Due to fading demand and economic considerations, now only a few artists are seen to practice the family tradition.

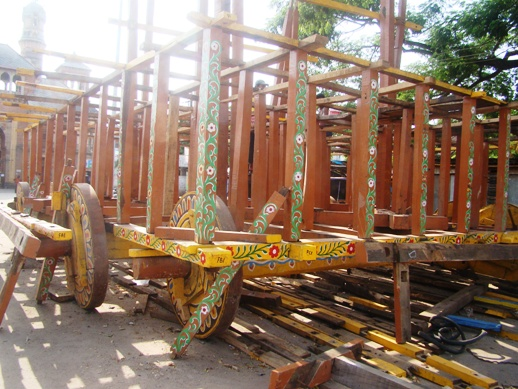
Paralakhemundi Ratha Jatra

The town celebrates almost all festivities, all round the year. The Jagannath Ratha Yatra being the most revered one. The Jagannath Rath Yatra of Paralakhemundi is second only to the famous Puri festival. The three idols of Lord Jagannath, Lord Balabhadra and Lord Subhadra are quite huge in size and are adorable. The Yatra or Car Festival, was patronized by the Gajapati kings. In the initial years the car festival would follow the traditions of puri and had three separate cars or rathas. However it became one car until 2012. In that year the concept of three cars was again implemented and since then, the three idols enjoy the festivities for nine days on their own cars.The believers throng the Jagannath Temple everyday and its worth watching the bhajan following the evening rituals.

Dasahara, Gamha Purnima, Holi, Gajalakshmi Puja, Ganesh Puja, Kali Puja, Makar Sankranthi and Thakurani Yatra are major Hindu festivals observed in the town. Christmas and Ramzan are also celebrated in the town. Traditionally the Thakurani yatra is conducted periodically for the local area Goddess (Grama Devi), a ritual that continues for about a week. During the Thakurani Yatra, the residents make caricatures, children participate in fancy dresses to make fun and to spread awareness regarding current issues. During evening, cultural programs like drama, orchestra and Bhuta Keli (dramatised romance of Lord Krishna and his Consort Radha maa) are staged. Gaja Muhaan is one more local traditional festivity. This is celebrated after the harvest season is over. The fresh paddy is converted into rice flakes, which are then made into a conical shape by using jaggery as the binding material. Huge cones of the rice flakes are prepared and are offered to the local resident Goddess. The Rice Flake Cone (Gaja Muhaan) is then taken out for procession around the city with orchestra and band. The believers carry these huge rice flake cones on their heads and dance to the tunes of the band to appease the Goddess. The scene is to be seen to be believed.

Being part of the erstwhile Jamindari, the tradition of learning martial art through rituals is another salient feature of this town. The paikas or the erstwhile fighter community still practice the Indian Martial Art forms like the Cane Game (Badi Khela), Sword Playing Tricks, Knife Playing Tricks, Playing with fire ball and lots more. The paikas perform these arts during the Dushera after the Ayudha Puja (worshiping of the Armour) which enthralls the audience and reminds everyone about the traditions of the past.

The town has an art school where children are trained in Odishi Dance and Odishi Sangeet (Songs). The Bhakti Sangeet group encourages young artists to sing and spreads the culture of harmony and togetherness through the devotional songs.

== Sports ==
Cricket is the major sport of the town. Volleyball, basketball, hockey are the other popular sports in the town. Little boys and girls can still be seen playing silly in the evening. The town has a small stadium named Gajapati Stadium. College ground is also a preferable venue for cricket, football matches. There are several other large play grounds that host some district and state level sport events. Cricket being the major game, it is played almost in every street. There are many cricket clubs and small organizers who organize multi-team cricket tournaments mainly during winter. Also, a tennis court and an indoor badminton court add to the sports facilities of the town.

== Heritage and tourism ==
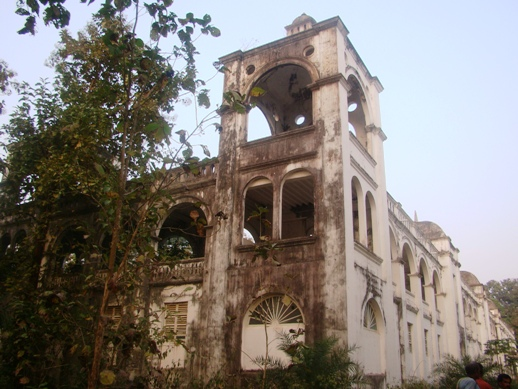
Brundaban Palace or Basant Nivas Palace

The small and historic town has many heritage places and places for tourist attraction. The places of attraction are

- Gajapati Palace
- The Jagannath Temple Complex
- The Large Water Reservoirs of Ram Sagar and Sita Sagar
- B.N. (Basant Nivas) Palace and the Mahendra Tanaya River
- The SKCG College, Maharaja Boys High School (MRBH) and Maharaja Girls High School (MRGH)
- The Chitrakaar Street, famous for Chitrakaar family & 500 years Painting and Traditional Arts.
- The Palace street, the Horn-Craft
- The Gopala Krushna Pathagaar (Library)
- The Bhoi Sahi Hill

== Tourist attractions ==
- The Gandahati Waterfalls (25 km by NH-326A)
- The Buddhist Settlement, Chandragiri (85 km by NH 326A)
- Tribal Culture and Forests of Gumma and Gaiba (28–29 km)
- Mahendragiri 4,925 ft high peak (52 km by SH4)
- Lihuri Gopinath (During Holi Festival) (46 km via Kotturu)
- The Alada Church (36 km by SH-4)
- Sri Kurmam Temple at Srikakulam (72 km by NH5)
- Sri Mukhalingam (33 km)
- Sri Radhaswami Temple of Mandasa (47 km by SH-4)
- Taptapani (Hot Spring) (110 km by NH-326A)
- Sita Temple At Hill Top (26 km by SH-4, GARABANDHA)
- Khajuripada Hanuman Temple (48 km via NH-326A)

== In popular culture ==
The Odia film "Sundergarh Ra Salman Khan" starring Babushaan Mohanty was shot in the BN Palace of Paralakhemundi.

== Politics ==
Current MLA from Paralakhemundi is Rupesh Jena from 2024( BJD) . He won against Narayana Rao of BJP. In 2019 K. Narayan Rao was MLA who again won but this time from Bharatiya Janata Party (BJP) from 2019. His competitors were Rajakumari of Gajapati from Biju Janata Dal(BJD) and K. Surya Rao from Indian National Congress (INC).

Current MLA from Paralakhemundi Assembly Constituency is Mr. Kengam Surya Rao Indian National Congress (INC) won the seat in State elections in 2014 trailing K.Narayana Rao (Biju Janata Dal), who won last elections in 2009. Trinath Sahu of INC, who won the seat in State elections in 2004 and also in 2000 and in 1985. He also won this seat as an independent candidate in 1995. Previous MLAs from this seat were Darapu Lachana Naidu who won this seat representing JD in 1990, and Bijoy Kumar Jena who won this seat as independent candidate in both 1980 and in 1977.

Paralakhemundi is part of Berhampur (Lok Sabha constituency).
