= Gajapati Palace =

Gajapati Palace of Paralakhemundi
- ଗଜପତି ରାଜପ୍ରାସାଦ
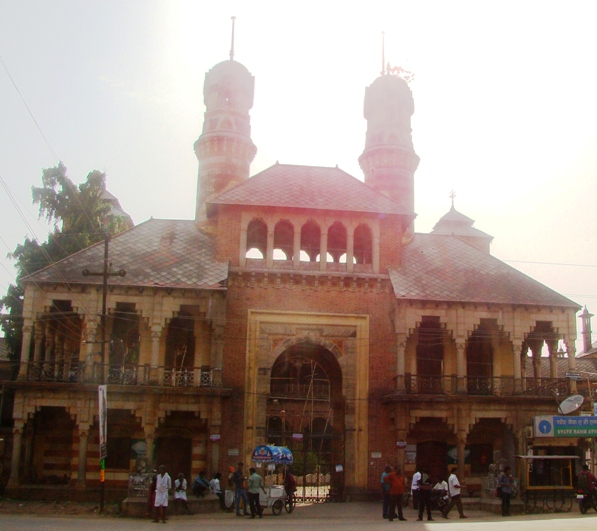
- Gajapati Palace of Paralakhemundi
- Interactive map of the Gajapati Palace of Paralakhemundi area

General information
- Architectural style: Indo-Saracenic, Byzantine
- Location: Paralakhemundi
- Coordinates: 18.778687°N 84.086881°E
- Construction started: 1835
- Completed: 1843
- Client: Jagannath Gajapati Narayan Deo III
- Governing body: Archaeological Survey of India

Gajapati Palace located at Paralakhemundi, of Gajapati district, Odisha, is the seat of Ganga rulers of Paralakhemundi. Nowadays the property is under the protection of Indian National Trust for Art and Cultural Heritage (INTACH). The Palace is one of the rich architectural and cultural heritage of India. This palace was built for a purpose of permanent residential abode for the Gajapati Rulers of Paralakhemundi Estate belonging to the Eastern Ganga dynasty.

== History ==
The palace was built by great-grandfather of Maharaja Krushna Chandra Gajapati, Jagannath Gajapati Narayan Deo III the Gajapati ruler of that time. It is believed that the Paralakhemundi ruler started building the palace to enhance the beauty of the state. The concept of building on the site was finalized on 20 May 1835. As regards its historical importance, the seeds of a separate statehood for the Odia-speaking people were germinated in the Gajapati Palace precincts.

== Architecture ==
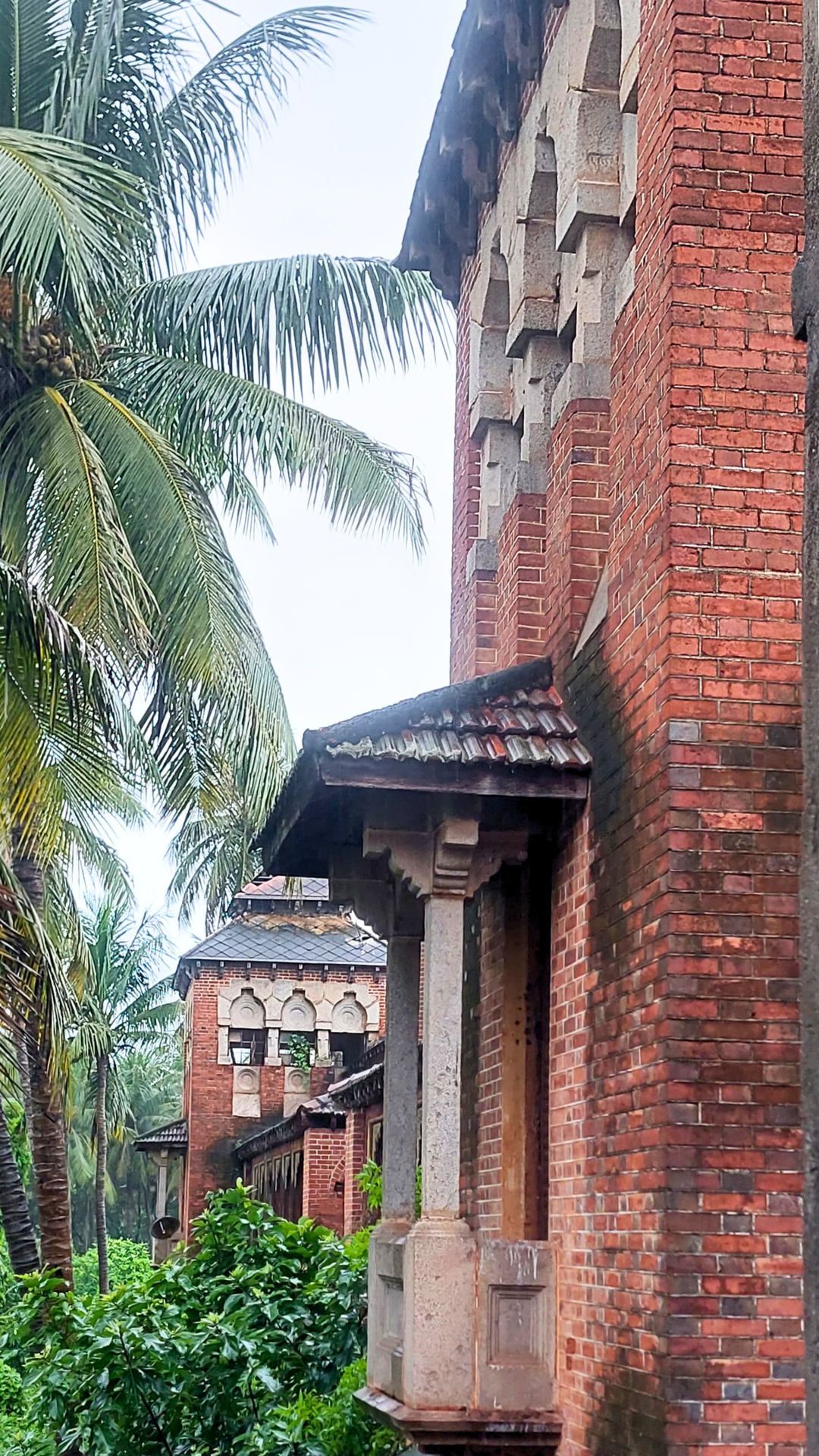
The Gajapati Palace at Paralakhemundi, 2025

The palace is known for its rich culture among the world heritages. British Architect, Robert Fellowes Chisholm was responsible for design and construction of this royal residence and seat of the Gajapati rulers. Chisholm later became a consulting architect with the Madras Presidency government. The fort and Palace design is influenced by a revival Indo-Saracenic style combined with Byzantine and other European architectural features. The palace is a 3-storey structure which has a secret hall and a subversive passageway that links to the chief citadel of the Maharaja. The building includes an underground floor connecting it with the main palace of the Maharaja. It is believed that this secret passage was used by the royal family to hide during attacks from enemies.

The construction of the Palace started in 1835 and was completed in 1843 during the reign of Jagannath Gajapati Narayan Deo III with an approximate cost of 500,000 rupees.

A stunning wood let is also situated close to Brundaban Palace. While entering into the Singhadwar (the main gate) two reclining lions statues are seen on both sides over two raised platforms.It is interesting to note that this lion design predates Edwin Landseer & Carlo Marochetti's Barbary lions sculpture located at the Nelson's Column, Trafalgar Square, London and also that of the Széchenyi Chain Bridge lions at Budapest, Hungary.

A huge ornate iron gate stands anchored in between two round shaped tall minarets known as a Gombuja (ଗମ୍ବୁଜ) or dome. A large mounted metal bell is situated at the main entrance, to be struck manually by a heavy wooden mallet for indicating accurate hourly time to the Palace and the general public of the town.

The gilt decorated walls and intricate wooden trellis-worked Durbar Hall is the main attraction of the Palace. It is an excellent piece of art to experience. Durbar Hall is located in the middle of the palace and consists of Raja Mahal and Rani Mahal (the two main wings of the palace). The construction is so symmetrical that if one stands on the centre line of the place and makes comparison of both the wings, it is found that one half appears to be exactly the mirror image of the other half.

Another place of interest in the fort is the Gantaghar (strong-room), which was also used as an armoury room.

== Location ==
Gajapati Palace of Paralakhemundi located in Paralakhemundi city, Gajapati district. Gajapati district in Odisha is nearly 280 km from Bhubaneswar.
