= Shri Krushna Chandra Gajapati Autonomous College =

College in Odisha, India

Shri Krushna Chandra Gajapati Autonomous College, Paralakhemundi
- ଶ୍ରୀ କୃଷ୍ଣ ଚନ୍ଦ୍ର ଗଜପତି ସ୍ଵୟଂଶାସିତ ମହାବିଦ୍ୟାଳୟ, ପାରଳାଖେମୁଣ୍ଡି
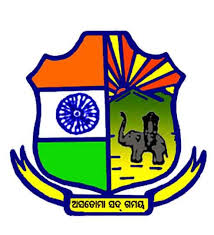
- Official Emblem of SKCG Autonomous College
- Motto: "असतो मा सद्गमय"
- Motto in English: "From Falsehood Lead Me To Truth"
- Type: Education Institute
- Established: 1896(As College), 2002(As Autonomous College)
- Affiliations: UGC, Berhampur University
- Principal: Dr. Jeetendranath Patnaik
- Location: Paralakhemundi, Odisha, India; 18.779536°N 84.094886°E
- Campus: Spread over 60 acre
- Website: www.skcgparala.ac.in

Shri Krushna Chandra Gajapati Autonomous College (Odia: ଶ୍ରୀ କୃଷ୍ଣଚନ୍ଦ୍ର ଗଜପତି ସ୍ଵୟଂଶାସିତ ମହାବିଦ୍ୟାଳୟ) is an autonomous college situated in Paralakhemundi in southern Odisha.

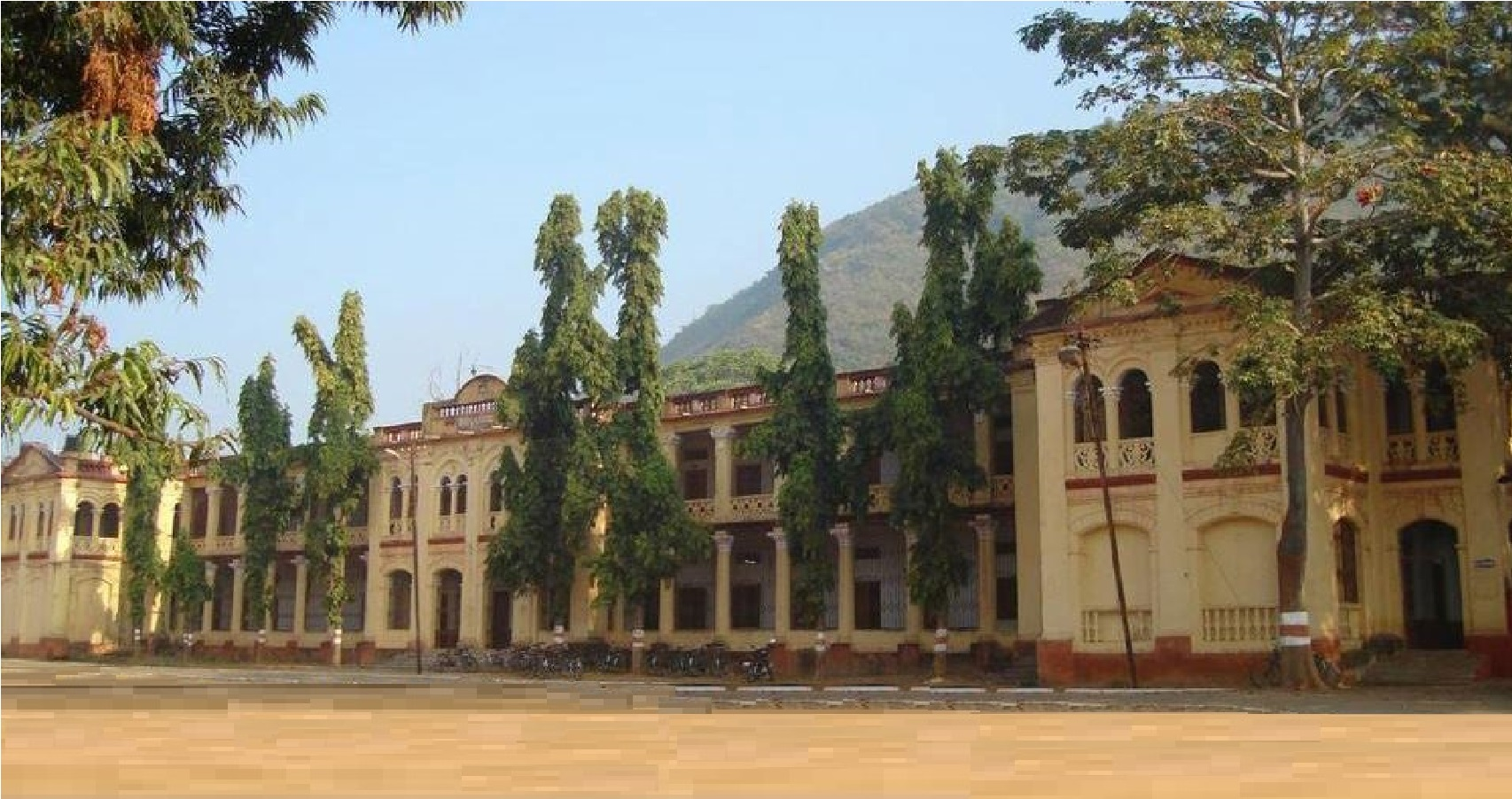
SKCG College, Paralakhemundi

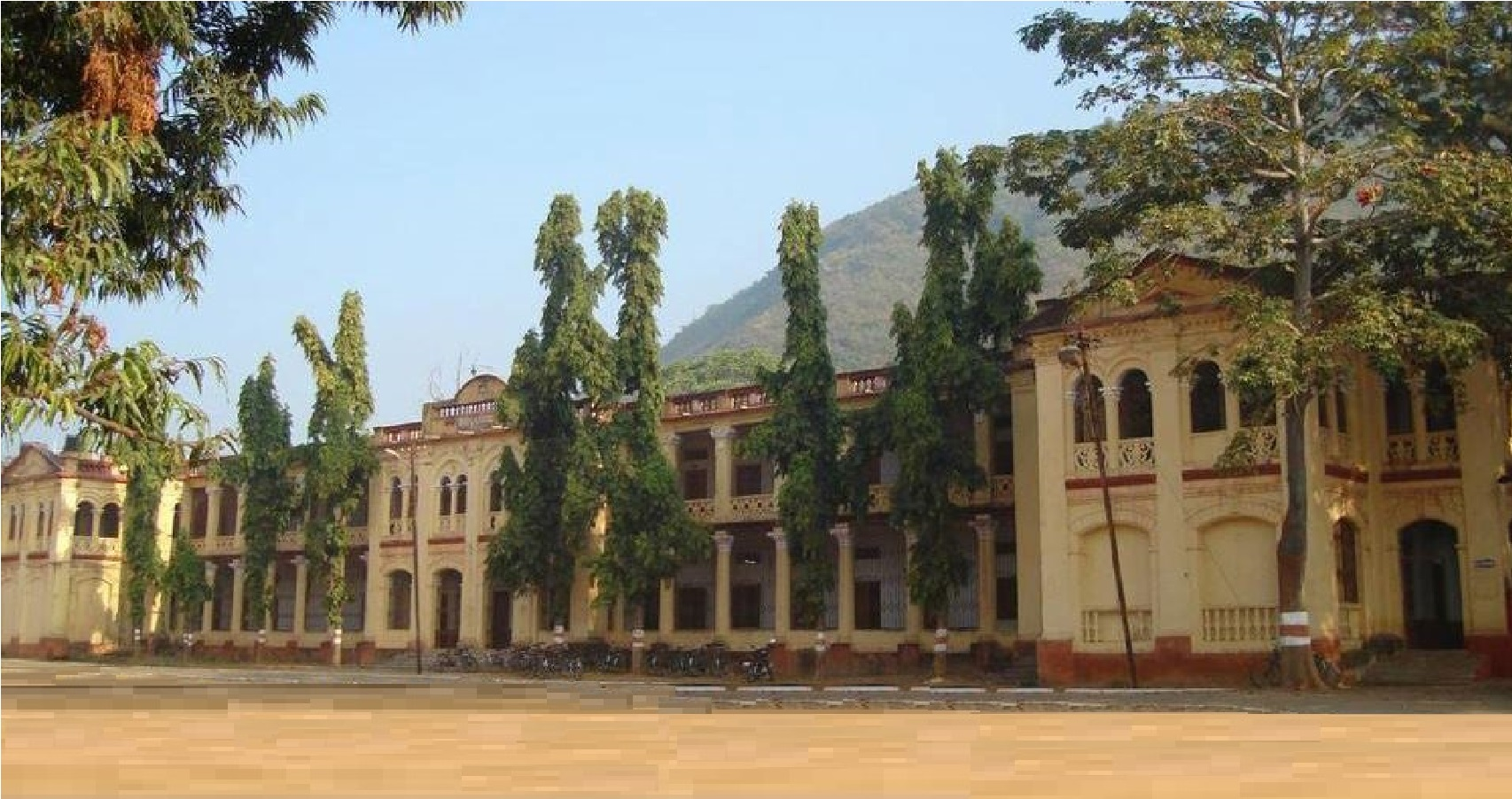
SKCG College view

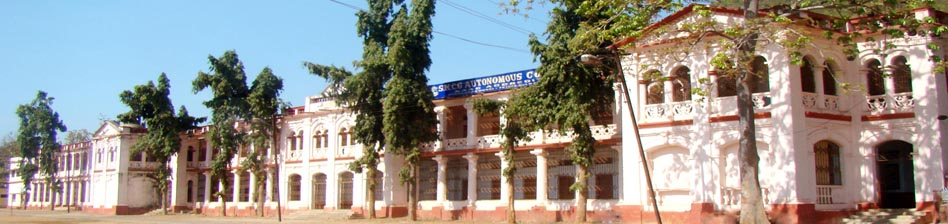
College panoramic view

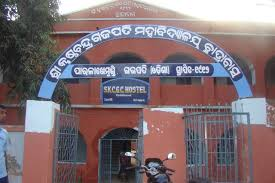
College Main Hostel

== History ==
The history of growth and development of the college is accredited to the former rulers of Paralakhemundi, and the spread of education in Odisha. The institution was founded in 1896 under the patronage of the Raja of Paralakhemundi Shri Goura Chandra Gajapati Narayana Deo. The then headmaster of M.R.B.H. School Nangu Sreenivas Rao was given the charge of the institution. In the same year, it obtained affiliation as a second grade college from the Madras University. The college received the status of a first grade college in the year 1936.

Originally affiliated to the Madras University and then to the Andhra University, the college was one of the first five affiliated colleges with which Utkal University started functioning in November 1943. On 2 January 1967, Berhampur University came into existence and since then the college is affiliated with it.

On 11 July 1947, the management was taken over by the Government of Orissa and the college was renamed Sri Krushna Chandra Gajapati Autonomous College. Towards the end of 1948, the college was shifted from its old building to the Morrison Extension, in which it is housed today. The college celebrated its centenary from 10 to 12 January 2001.

The college uses its own methods of admission, evaluation, and conduct of examinations. The students’ performance is evaluated both internally and externally. The college has its own Boards of Studies and an Academic Council to achieve the aims and objectives of Autonomy.

The college was one of the first Lead Colleges of Orissa in 1990. The institute is the second-oldest college in the state. The college has been assessed by the National Assessment and Accreditation Council (NAAC) of India in September 2004 and received B Grade.

== Notable alumni ==
- Giridhar Gamang (Former Chief minister of Odisha)
- Prasant Padhi (Singer)
- Sibaram Satapathy (Writer)
- Harish Chandra Buxipatra (member of Orissa Legislative Assembly)

== Hostel ==
The college hostels provide accommodation for 240 boarders. The S.K.C.G. Boys' Hostel and the P.M.N. Hostel have a capacity of 110 and 50 boarders respectively.

== Departments ==
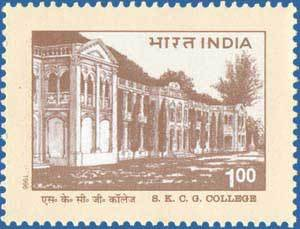
S. K. C. G. College postage stamp, 1996

The college has a sanctioned strength of 2016 students and 83 teachers. It has affiliation in almost all major disciplines in the faculties of Arts, Science, and Commerce. From the session 1996–97 P.G. courses in Mathematics has been added to the already existing post graduate teaching facilities in Economics, Chemistry, Oriya, Commerce, and Life Science. Besides teaching facilities for Honors courses in Mathematics, Physics, Chemistry Botany, Zoology, Computer application, English, Oriya, Sanskrit, Geography, History, Political Science, & Economics the college also offers teaching in subjects like Telugu, Hindi, Logic, Philosophy, and Home Science. The Indira Gandhi National Open University has opened a center in this college.

== Infrastructure ==
- The college has 42 classrooms, 8 galleries and 3 halls.
- The ground area is of 22,317m^{2}
- The college campus has separate buildings for Science, Commerce, and Arts.
- The Library Block has an Auditorium on the first floor, which was built in the year 1964–65.
- Extension of the main building includes a two storied block for the Humanities, an open-air stage, Geography Department, a cycle stand, a canteen, an animal house, a workshop, and the acquisition of the Mission Bungalow.
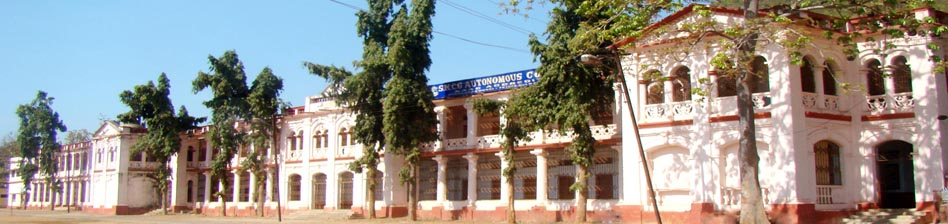
Panoramic view of SKCG College
