= A. B. Walawalkar =

Indian railway engineer, epigraphist, and historian

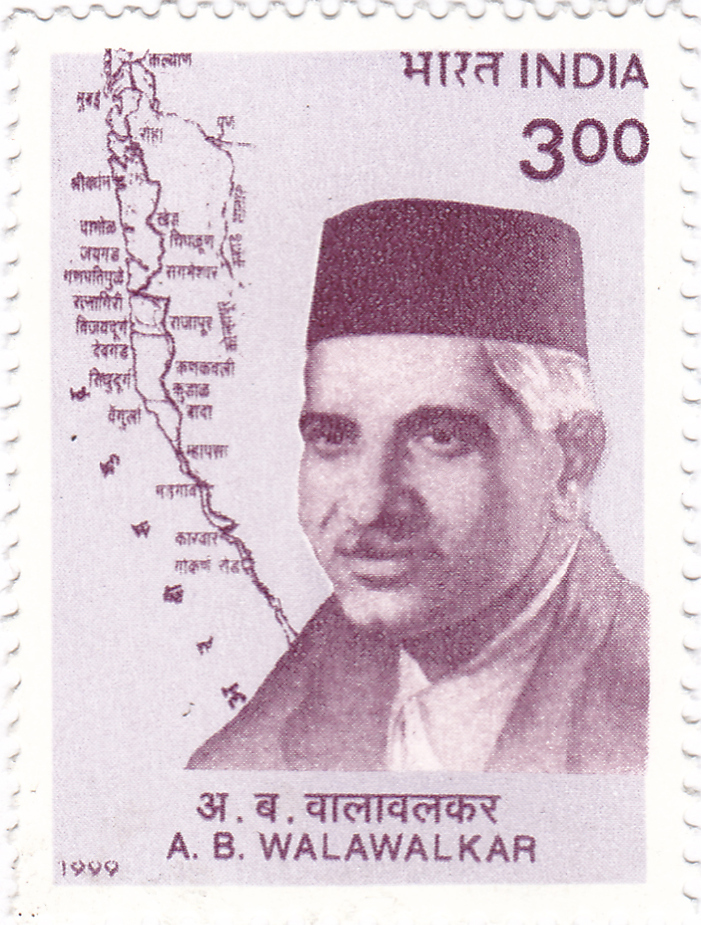
- Born: 27 December 1897; Walawal, Kudal
- Died: 23 December 1970 (aged 72)
- Citizenship: India
- Known for: Konkan Railway Project
- Scientific career
- Fields: Indian Railways, Konkan Railway, Konkan Railway Corporation
- Institutions: Vadodara, Mumbai, Mangalore

A. B. Walawalkar (27 December 1897 – 23 December 1970) was an Indian railway engineer, epigraphist, and historian. He is regarded as the founder of Konkan Railway. Born on 27 December 1897, he was from the village of Walawal in Kudal Taluka of Sindhudurg District in Maharashtra. He belongs to Naik Maratha Samaj of Sindhudurg.

== Career ==
=== Railway engineering ===
Shri Arjun Balwant Walawalkar joined Central India Railway (presently Western Railway) in its Engineering Drawing Department in 1922. In 1952 he published a booklet on Konkan Railway Project. He delivered seminars and wrote many articles in local and national newspapers about this project. Many people criticized Walawalkar, believing the project was not useful.

=== Indian epigraphy and history ===
Besides his public career, he was an eminent epigraphist. He studied the Brahmi epigraphy in ancient India. He tried to decipher the Indus script. He suggested a theory of development of the Indian epigraphic system according to the Maheshwara Sutras. He also proposed that the Indus script is akin to the Assyrian cuneiform & both have developed from an ancient Indic script, which he called 'Pre-Ashokan Brahmi'.

He also studied medieval inscriptions in South Konkan & proposed new theories about the history and origin of the Sawant rulers of Sawantwadi. He theorized that Mang Sawant described in an inscription at Mathgaon (located in Vengurla Taluka), was an earlier ruler of Kudal region and ancestor of the Kshatriya Sawant family, who migrated to South Konkan after the fall of the Shilaharas.
