= Jarjangi =

Indian village

- Village
- Interactive map of Jarjangi
- Location in Andhra Pradesh, India
- Coordinates: 18.5013956°N 84.1317126°E
- Country: India
- State: Andhra Pradesh
- District: Srikakulam

Government
  - Type: Gram Panchayat

Languages
  - Official: Telugu
- Time zone: UTC+5:30 (IST)
- PIN: 532195
- Vehicle Registration: AP30 (Former) AP39 (from 30 January 2019)
- Lok Sabha constituency: Srikakulam
- Vidhan Sabha constituency: Tekkali

Jarjangi is a Panchayath village in Kotabommali mandal (formerly Narasannapeta taluk), Srikakulam district, in the Indian state of Andhra Pradesh. The Postal Index Code of this village is 532195.

Jarjangi village is located on National Highway 16 (India) and Andhrapradesh SH 106.

== Geography ==
Jarjangi is located at 18.5013956°N 84.1317126°E longitude and latitudes. This village is 28 metres above sea level. Jarjangi village is nearer to Bay of Bengal . Summer season, Rainy season, winter season are the three main seasons occur in this village.

== Demography ==
The local language is Telugu. Jarjangi village's total population is 1051 and the number of houses is 279. The female population is 52.4%. The village literacy rate is 62.2% and the female literacy rate is 26.0%. The total male population is 500; the total female population is 551.

== Transportation ==
Jarjangi is well connected by APSRTC buses, autos and taxis. APSRTC runs bus services through this village to Palasa, Tekkali, Kotabommali, Narasannapeta, and Srikakulam.

Jarjangi Junction is located on National Highway 16 and State Highway 106.

Jarjangi Junction is a main junction for changing towards Srimukhalingam, Challavanipeta, Jalumuru, Saravakota, Pathapatnam, Parlakimaidi, Narasannapeta, Srikakulam, Kotabommali, Tekkali, Palasa, Palakonda, Komanapalli, Sarubujjili, Hiramandalam, Parapuram Kotturu, Battili, Bhamini, Amadalavalsa, Parvathipuram, Gunupur, Rayagada and Gotta village.

The nearest railway stations are Kotabommali railway station (KBM), Harishchandrapuram railway station (HCM), Tilaru railway station (TIU), Palasa railway station (PSA), Srikakulam Road railway station (CHE), Naupada railway station (NWP) and Tekkali Railway station (TEK).

== Gallery ==
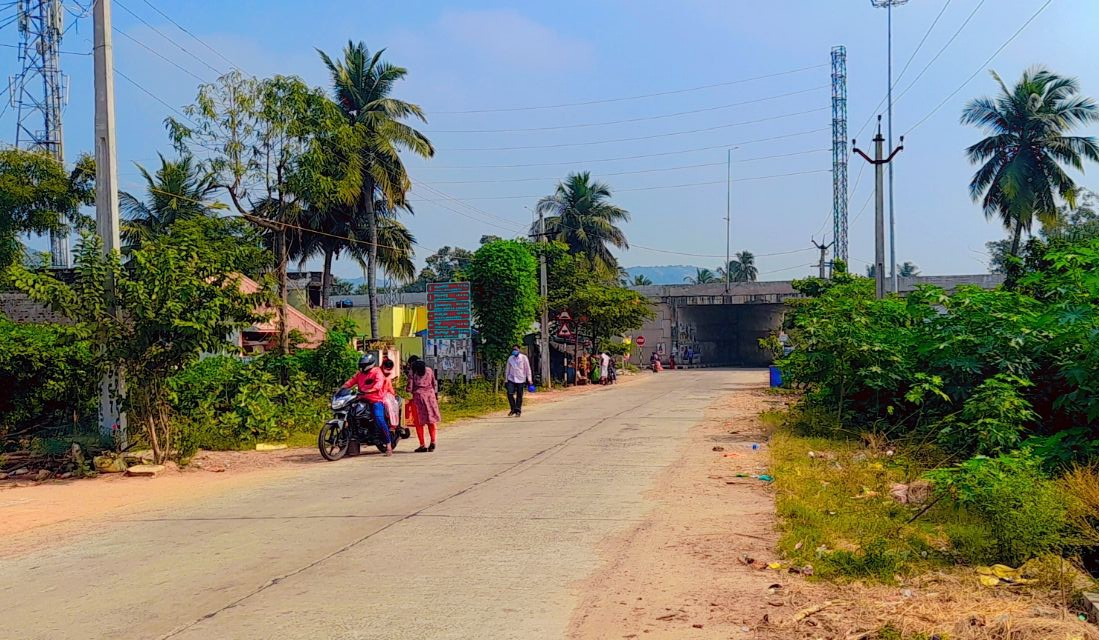
National Highway 16 (India) and (Jarjangi - Srimukhalingam - Pindruvada) State Highway 106 merging at Jarjangi Junction.

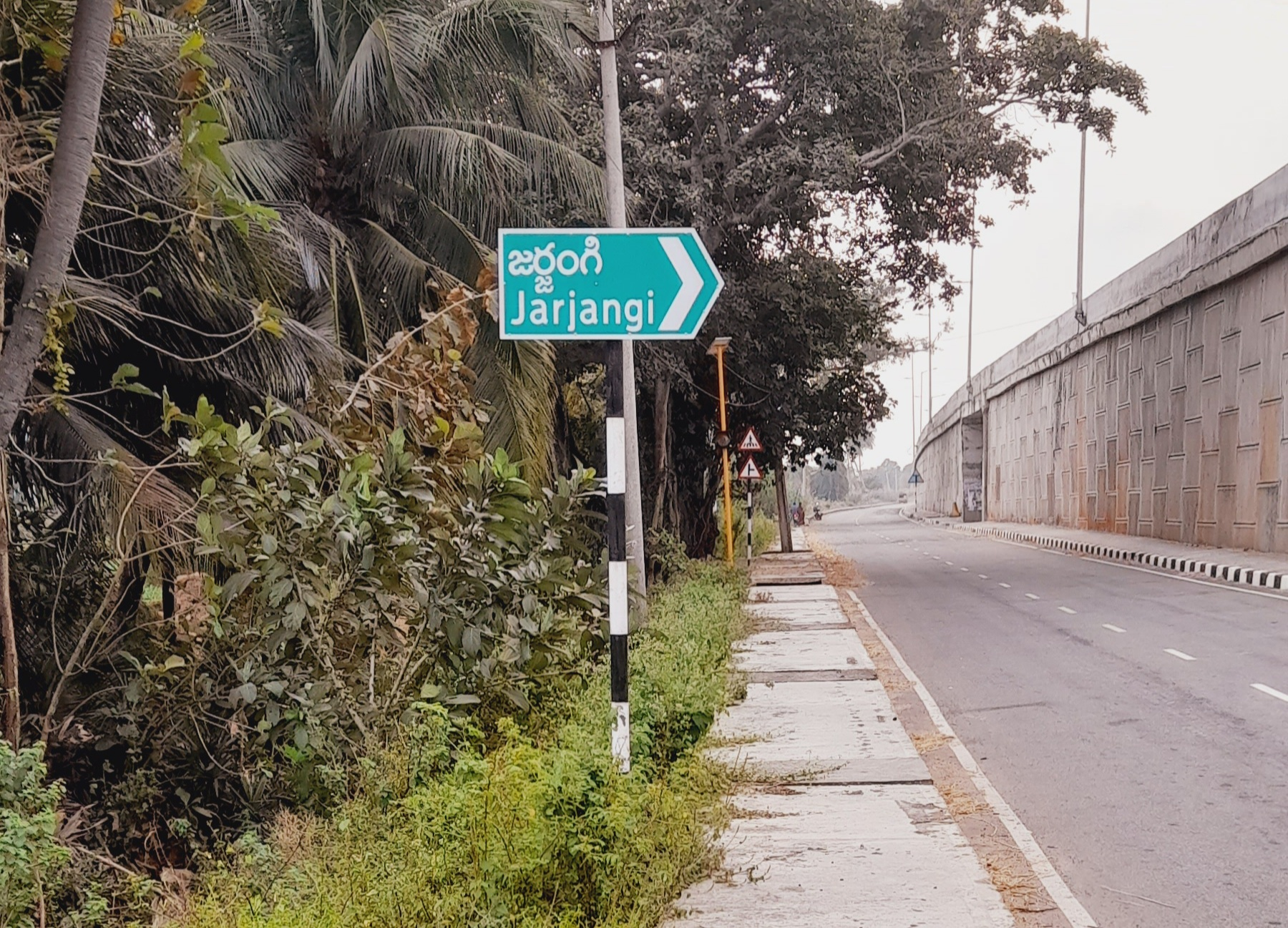
A Signboard of Jarjangi Village on National Highway 16 (India)

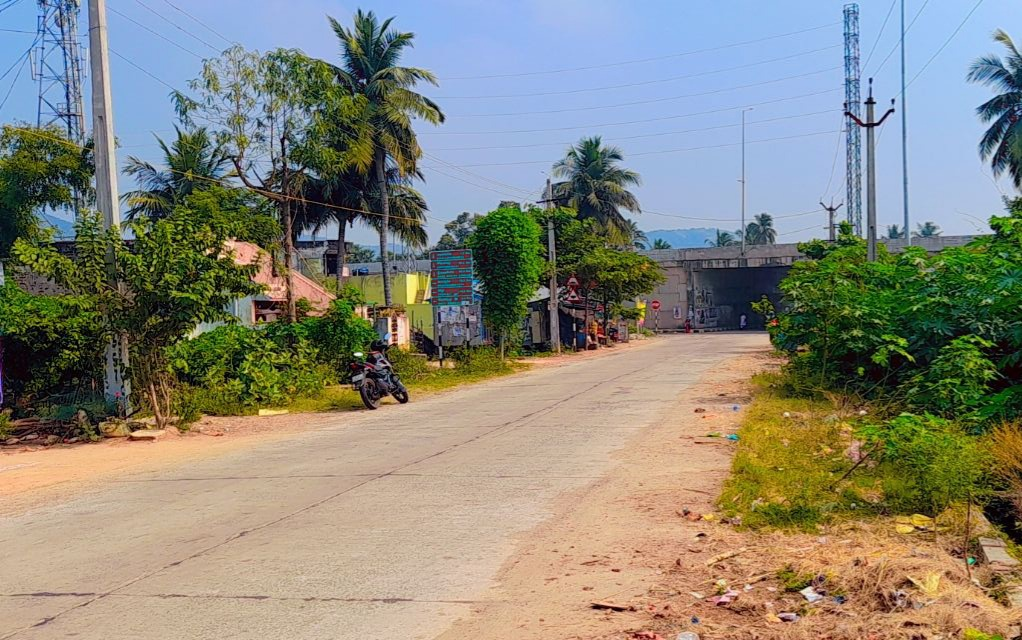
National Highway 16 and State Highway 106 Merging at Jarjangi Junction.

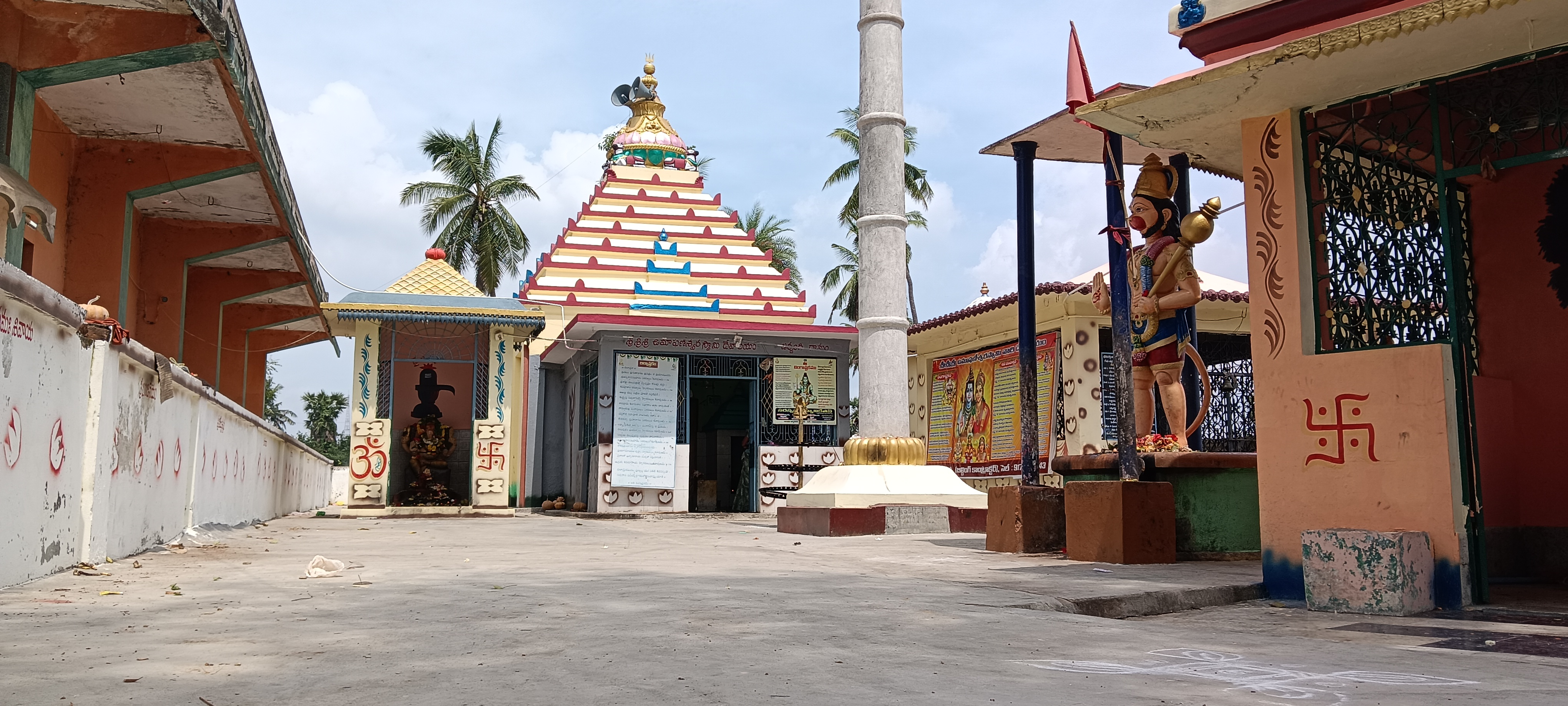
Jarjangi Sri Sri Sri Uma Phaneeswara Swami Vaari Devalayam
