= Sarubujjili =

Coordinates: 18°36′42″N 83°56′30″E

- Village
- Interactive map of Sarubujjili
- Country: India
- State: Andhra Pradesh
- District: Srikakulam
- Talukas: Sarubujjili

Languages
  - Official: Telugu
- Time zone: UTC+5:30 (IST)
- PIN: 532458
- Vehicle Registration: AP30 (Former); AP39 (from 30 January 2019)
- Lok Sabha constituency: Srikakulam
- Vidhan Sabha constituency: Amadalavalasa

Sarubujjili is a village in Srikakulam district of the Indian state of Andhra Pradesh. Sarubujjili mandal is bordered by Burja, Seethampeta, Hiramandalam, Jalumuru and Narasannapeta mandals of Srikakulam district.

== Politics ==
Sarubujjili is under Amadalavalasa Assembly constituency in Andhra Pradesh and Srikakulam Parliamentary constituency.

=== List of elected members ===
Assembly candidates details:

- Tammineni Paparao
- Boddepalli Rajagopala Rao
- Tammineni Seetaram
- Boddepalli Satyavathi

Parliamentary Candidate details:

- Boddepalli Rajagopala Rao
- Kanithi Viswanatham
- Kinjarapu Errannaidu
- Killi Kruparani

== Transportation ==
Sarubujjili is a major four roads junction. Andhrapradesh State Highway 115 and two connects Sarubujjili.

Sarubujjili Junction is a major four junction for changing towards Palkonda, Srimukhalingam, Jalumuru, Challavanipeta, Jarjangi, Amadalavalasa, Srikakulam, Hiramandalam, Kotturu, Battili.

More APSRTC buses are operated between Srikakulam to Battili, connecting Sarubujjili village.

Sarubujjili is well connected by most APSRTC buses from Srikakulam bus stand to Battili, Parapuram Kotturu and Haddubangi villages.

There are autos, cabs, and taxis from srikakulam to Sarubujjili.
