= Saravakota =

- Village
- Interactive map of Saravakota
- Location in Andhra Pradesh, India Saravakota (India)
- Coordinates: 18.5930090°N 84.0523816°E
- Country: India
- State: Andhra Pradesh
- District: Srikakulam
- Talukas: Saravakota

Languages
  - Official: Telugu
- Time zone: UTC+5:30 (IST)
- PIN: 532426
- Vehicle Registration: AP30 (Former); AP39 (from 30 January 2019)

Saravakota is a village in Srikakulam district of the Indian state of Andhra Pradesh. It is located in Saravakota mandal of Palakonda revenue division.

== Geography ==
Saravakota is located at 18.5930090°N 84.0523816°E. It has an average elevation of 61 meters (203 feet). It is a part of Narasannapeta Legislative Assembly Constituency.

== Transportation ==
Saravakota is Well Connected by APSRTC buses and private Buses.

Autos, taxis are available to this village. Major Road National Highway 326A (India) passes through this village. Nearest towns are Pathapatnam, Narasannapeta, Challavanipeta, Tekkali.

Nearest Railway Station are Pathapatnam Railway station, Tilaru railway station.

APSRTC runs Several buses from Visakhapatnam Srikakulam to Pathapatnam town.
