= Garimella Satyanarayana =

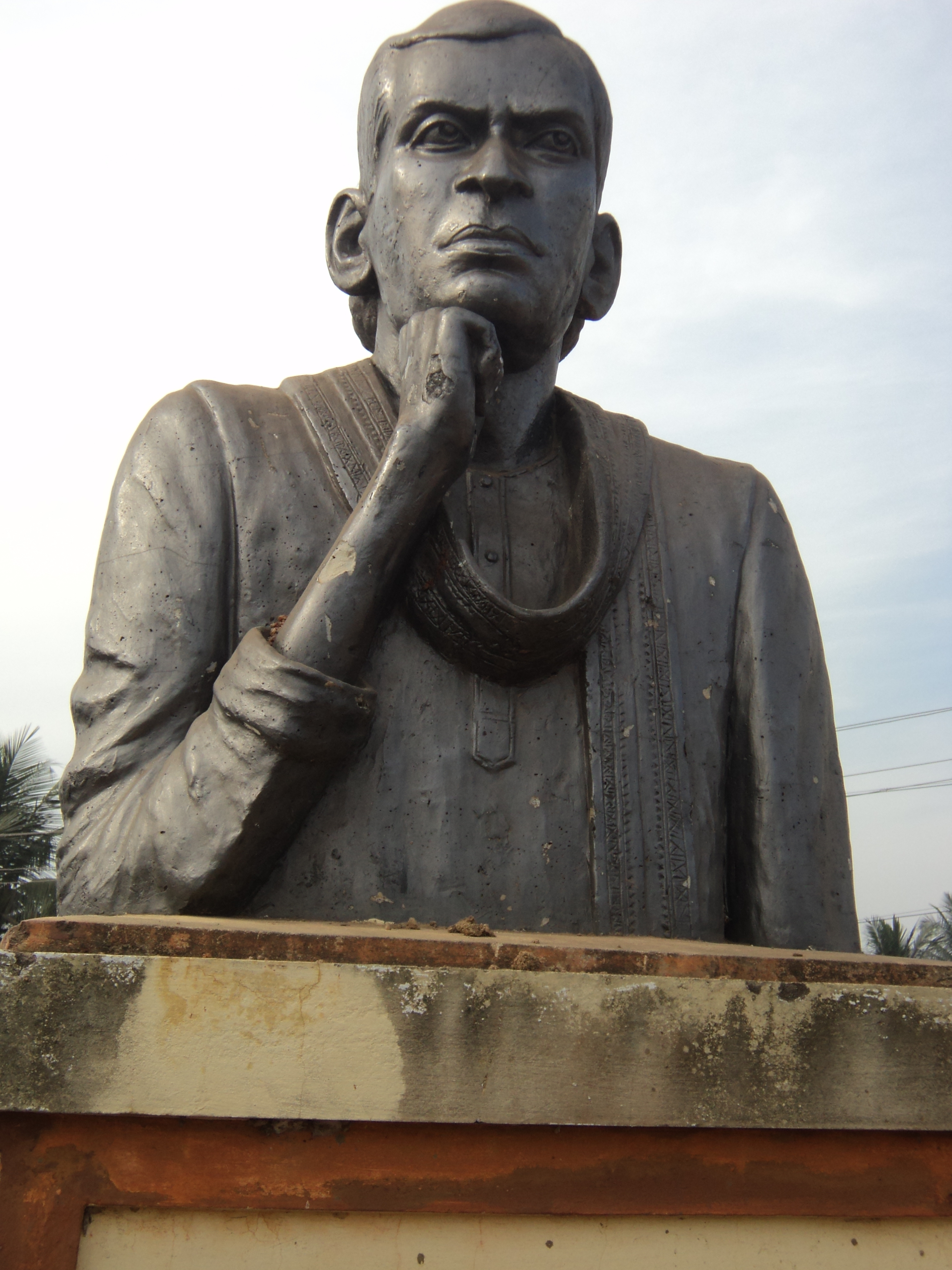
- Statue of Garimella Satyanarayana in Srikakulam
- Born: 14 July 1893; Priya agharam, Narasannapeta, Srikakulam, India
- Died: 18 December 1952 (aged 59)
- Occupations: Poet, writer, freedom fighter

Garimella Satyanarayana (14 July 1893 – 18 December 1952) was a poet and freedom fighter of Andhra Pradesh, India. He influenced and mobilised the Andhra people against the British Raj with his patriotic songs and writings, for which he was jailed several times by the British administration.

== Early life ==
He was born in a Brahmin family to Venkatanarasimham and Suramma in Priya agraharam village in Narasannapeta taluq of Srikakulam district in 1893

== Career ==
Garimella Satyanarayana was born in a poor family in Gonepadu village, near Priya agraharam, in Narasannapeta taluk of Srikakulam district in 1893. His parents were Venkatanarasimham and Suramma.

Satyanarayana is identified by his famous song - "మాకొద్దీ తెల్ల దొరతనం " (We don't need this white rule). He himself used to sing this song. This particular song was a popular in the households of Andhra Pradesh during the Indian independence movement.

He was helped to study by a kind lawyer, called Kannepalli Narasimha Rao and finish graduation (BA). He worked as a clerk in collector's office of Ganjam district and as a teacher at a high school in Vijayanagaram. He gave up his studies by the call of Mahatma Gandhi to participate in Non-Cooperation movement. During this time, he wrote his famous song Maakoddee Telladoratanamu for which he was jailed in 1922 for one year. After the release from Jail, he continued his participation in the movement by singing songs in villages. For this he was sentenced for two and half years rigorous imprisonment. His entire family (wife, father and grandfather) died when he was in jail. He also ran a restaurant called Kalpaka Vilaas.

He died in a destitute state on 18 December 1952 after spending several years in poverty.

== Works ==
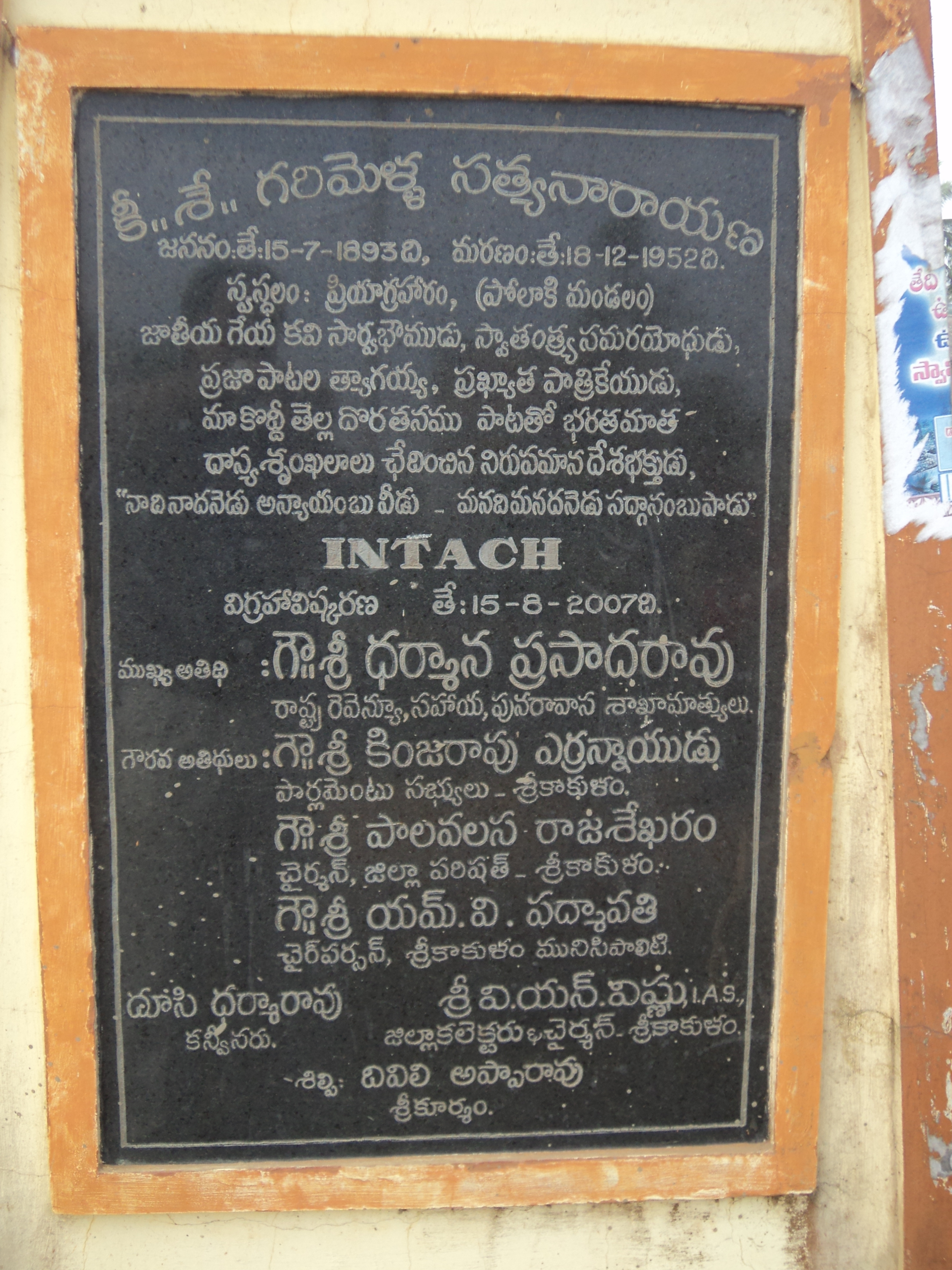
Information plate below his Statue in Srikakulam.

- Swaraajya geetamulu (1921)
- Harijana paatalu (1923)
- Khandakaavyalu, baalageetaalu (1923)
- Telugu translation of the Economic Conquest of India by Bhogaraju Pattabhi Sitaramayya.
- Telugu translation of "Tirukkural" and "Naandiyar" from Tamil.
- Telugu translation of "Tallikota" from Kannada.
- An English poem "Heart of the Nation,"
- Several articles in various daily and weekly journals like Grihalakshmi, Krishna Patrika, Aanandavani, Dhanka, Andhra Prabha and Bhaarati.

== Maakoddee Tella doratanamu ==
An English translation of his most famous poem Maakoddee Tella doratanamu in folk song format:

We don't want this White rule - Garimella Satyanarayana

We don't want this White man's rule O God We don't want this White man's rule

 We don't want this .... 2

Stalking on our lives Robbing us of our honour

 We don't want this .... 2 
 Stalking on our ....

(1) The eighteen lamps have doused off, but A handful of rice is hard to come by Throws dirt into our mouths Wants us to fight with his dogs to eat our food

  We don't want this ....   2

(2) For taxes he's devised ways Sells toddy and liquor Looted Chattels and belongings Drunken (husband) snatched that mother's wedding jewellery. Threw dust in to our eyes Pushed us close to our grave

 We don't want this ....  2

(3) Brought in Courts, created political parties. Murdered the charitable character Raised thirst for money Raised bad thoughts Showing off his style he wooed us

 We don't want this ....  2

(4) Brings on the Gandhi cap Don't come says Don't come to school like this Takes away the cap and moves on

It is rebellion against State It is all over the Country

We don't want this ....   2
Stalking on our ....

We don't want this White man's rule

== Sources ==
1. Biographic sketch
2. Review on Heart of India
3. Garimella Satyanarayana Article
4. GarimeLLa gEyAlu : Editor - parakAla paTTABirAmArAu,1992, Visalandhra Book House
5. Telugu sAhitya samIksha - Dr. G. Nagayya, Navya Parisodhana Pracurana, Tirupati, 1985.
6. AdhunikAndhra kavitvamu - Dr. C. Narayanareddy, Visalandhra,1993.
7. Freedom Struggle in Andhra Pradesh - Prof. Mamidipudi Venkatarangayya, Vols I-IV, 1965.
8. Andhrula Sankshipta Charitra - Etukuri Balaramamurthy, Visalandhra.
9. Naa Vaajnmaya Mitrulu, Kameswarrarao Tekumalla.
10. Noorguru Telugu Pramukhulu, M.L. Narasimharao.
