= Mukhalingam =

Mukhalingam Srimukhalingam
- Village
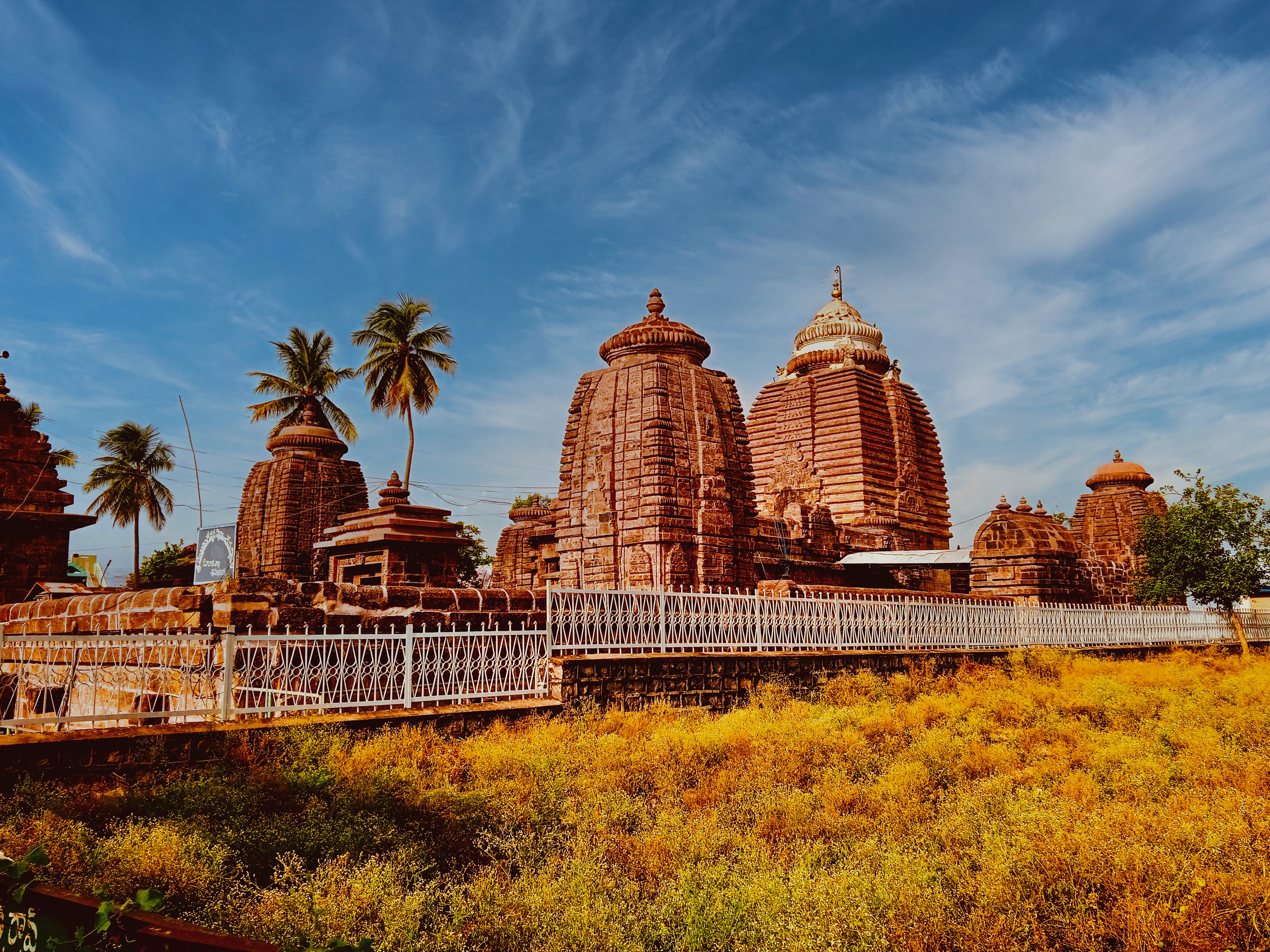
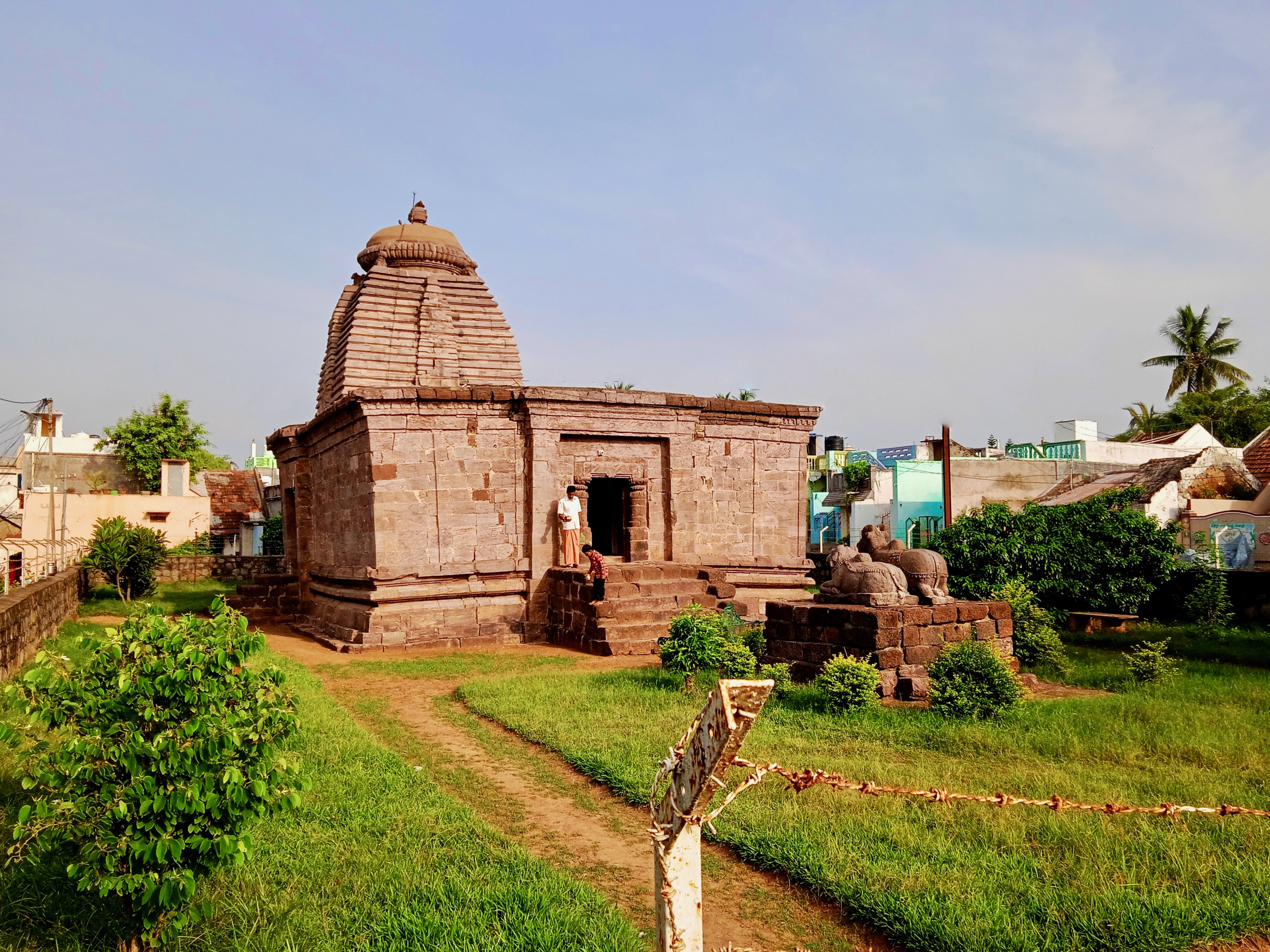
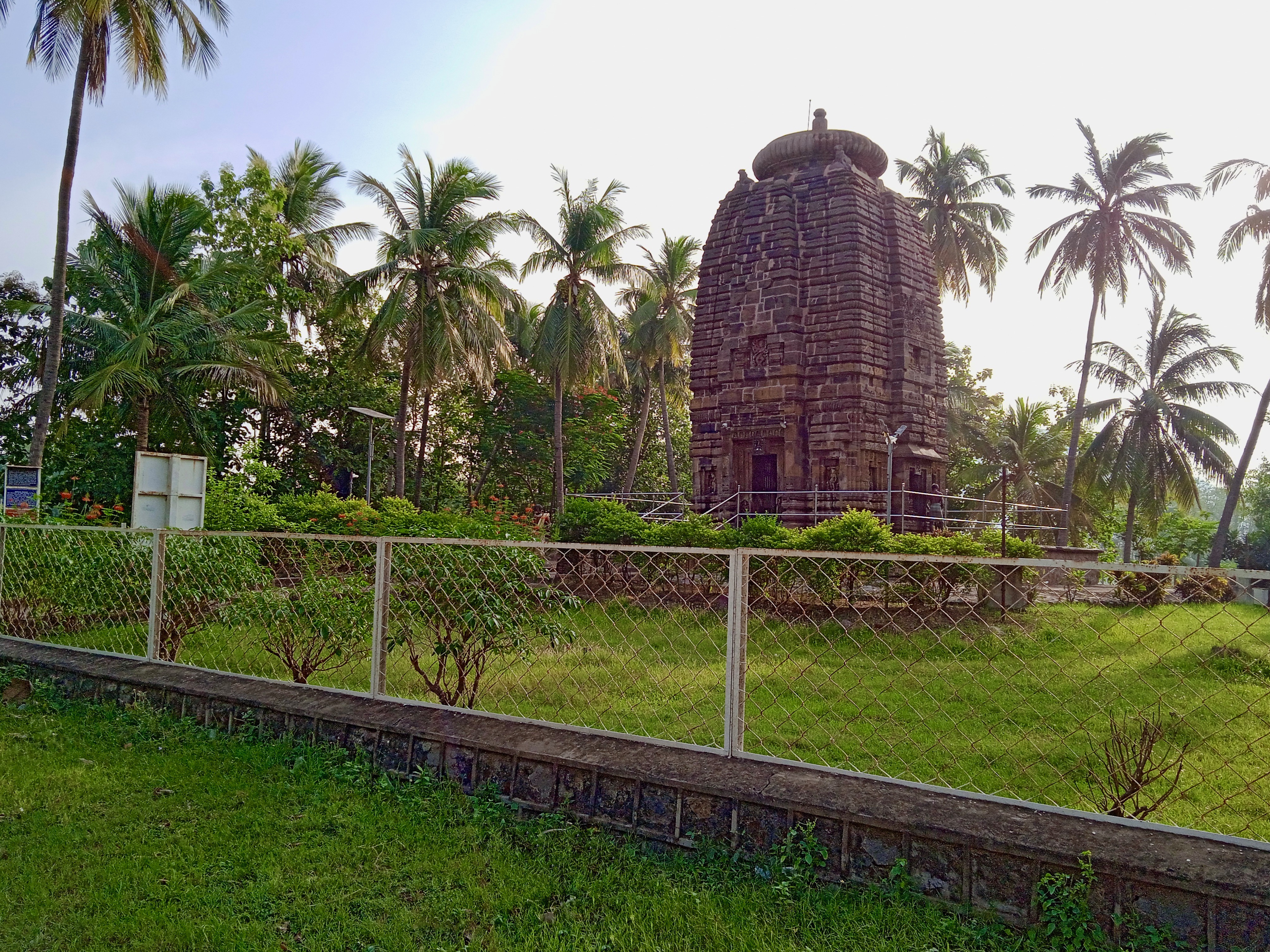
- Srimukhalingam temple Bhimeswara temple Someshwara temple
- Interactive map of Mukhalingam
- Location in Andhra Pradesh, India
- Coordinates: 18.6000°N 83.9667°E
- Country: India
- State: Andhra Pradesh
- District: Srikakulam
- Talukas: Jalumuru

Population
  - Total: 3,204

Languages
  - Official: Telugu
- Time zone: UTC+5:30 (IST)
- PIN: 532428
- Vehicle Registration: AP30 (Former); AP39 (from 30 January 2019)

Mukhalingam, also known as Srimukhalingam or Mukhalinga, is a village and gram panchayat in Jalumuru mandal of Srikakulam district in the Indian state of Andhra Pradesh. Historically known as Kalinganagari, Mukhalingam served as the capital of the Eastern Ganga dynasty from the 6th to the 12th century. In 1122, King Anantavarman Chodaganga Deva conquered Utkala and shifted the capital from Kalinganagari to Kataka (modern Cuttack).

The village is located on the left bank of Vamsadhara river at a distance of 48 km from Srikakulam town( nearest rail head ) and 160 km from Visakhapatnam ( nearest airport). Before 1936 it was under undivided Ganjam District.

Mukhalingam is home to a group of three Śaiva temples—Madhukeshwara, Someswara, and Bhimeswara—which have been variously dated by historians to between the late eighth and early eleventh centuries CE. Mukhalingam also served as the erstwhile capital of the Eastern Ganga dynasty. The principal temple of Sri Mukhalingam was constructed under the patronage of Eastern Ganga king Kamarnava Deva II, the great-grandfather of Anantavarman Chodaganga of Kalinga.

== Etymology ==
Various views by have been put forward for the origin of the name Mukhalingam. It states that "Mukhalingam" is a corruption of "Mohalingam", which is the Prakrit form of "Madhu[ka]linga". Another view states that the linga at the Madhukeshwara shrine is a faceted one and therefore the shrine and the town were termed as Mukhalinga with "Mukha" meaning face in Odia. It as also been posited that "Mukhalingam" is derived from "Mudu-Kalingam" which is the Telugu translation of the Sanskrit word "Tri-kalinga". Mukhalingam was the main city in the region of Kalinga, also known in the ancient period as Tri-Kalinga because it was divided into three regions.

== Geography ==
Mukhalingam is located at 18.5943°N 83.9635°E. It has an average elevation of 28 metres (92 ft).

== Transportation ==
Srimukhalingam is well connected by road ways. Andhra Pradesh State Highway 106 passes through Srimukhalingam village.

APSRTC operates several buses from Srikakulam bus stand to Srimukhalingam village. Many of autos, taxis and cabs are also available from Challavanipeta village to Srimukhalingam village. The village is also very near to Paralakhemundi town, district Headquarter of Gajapati District of Odisha state. Auto, taxi, bus, cabs facilities are there from the town.

Andhra Pradesh SH106 Connects Jarjangi, Challavanipeta, Jalumuru, Budithi, Komanapalli and Pindruvada villages with Sri Mukhalingam village.

== Demographics ==
According to the 2011 Census of India, Mukhalingam had a total population of 3,022 living in 837 households. The population comprised 1,504 males and 1,518 females. There were 265 children under six years of age, including 139 boys and 126 girls. The literacy rate was 63.58%.

== Culture ==
The dating of the temples has been contested among historians. The temples have been variously dated from late eighth century to eleventh century CE. The earliest among them was constructed in the late eighth or early ninth century and the latest one dates to early eleventh century. Later in 17th century Maharaja of Paralakhemundi Estate renovated this temple. Every year famous Chakratirtha Snana (holy bath) is taken by pilgrims. Lakhs of pilgrims visit from Odisha and Andhra Pradesh on the auspicious day to take the holy bath and take blessings of Lord Shiva.

== Gallery ==
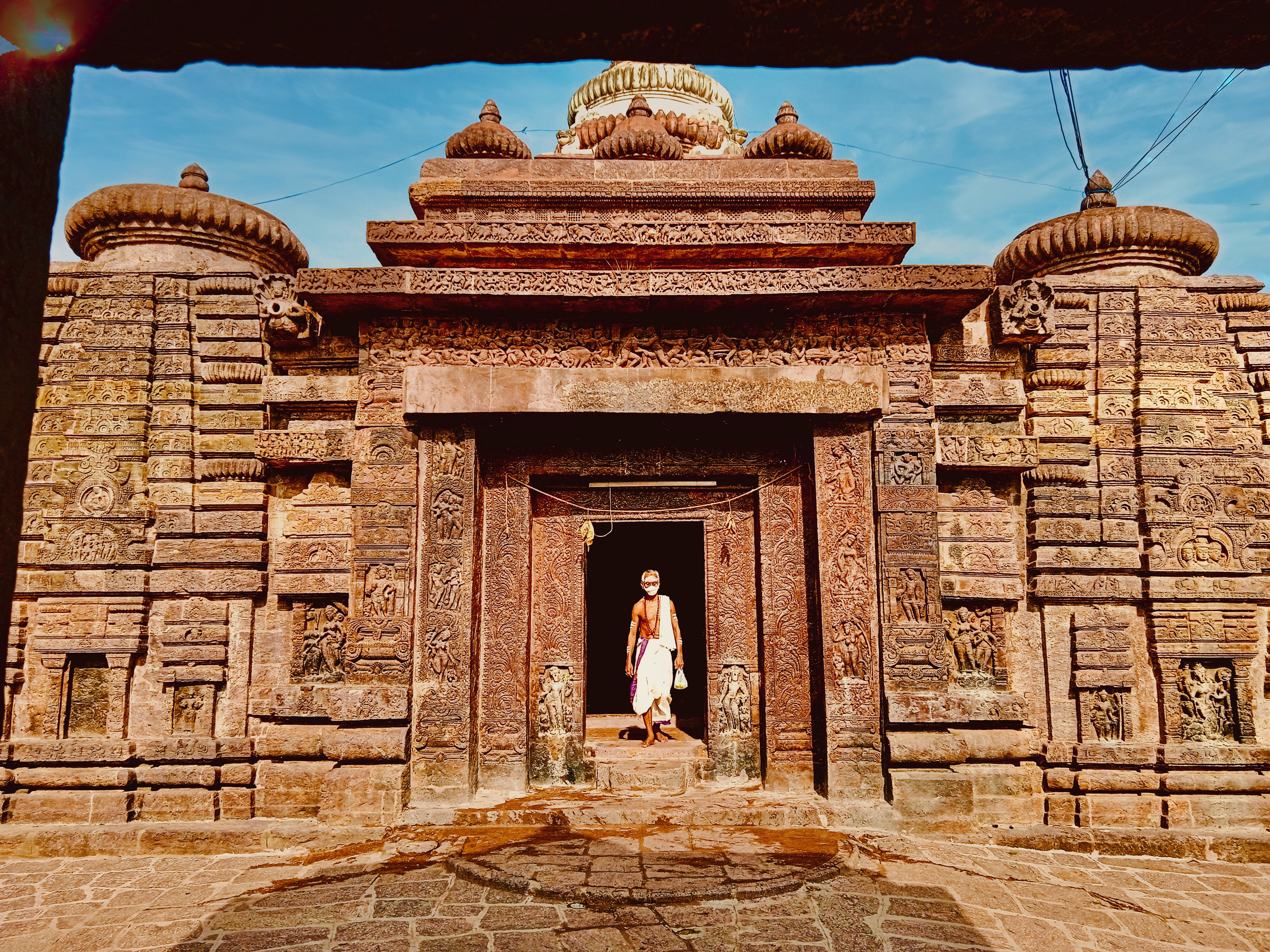
Entrance to the Sri Mukhalingam Temple complex

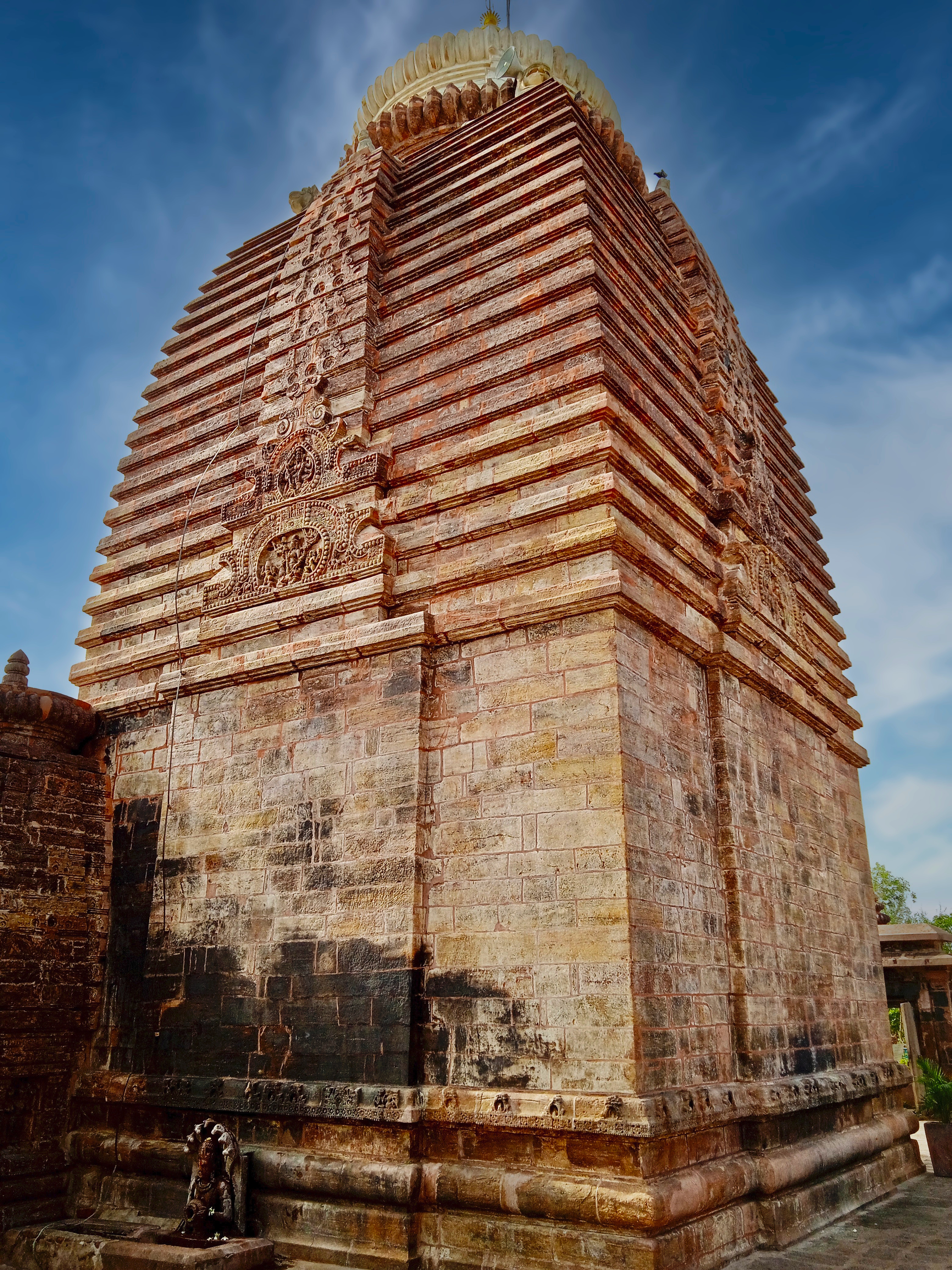
Temple tower (rekha deul/vimana) at the Sri Mukhalingam Temple complex

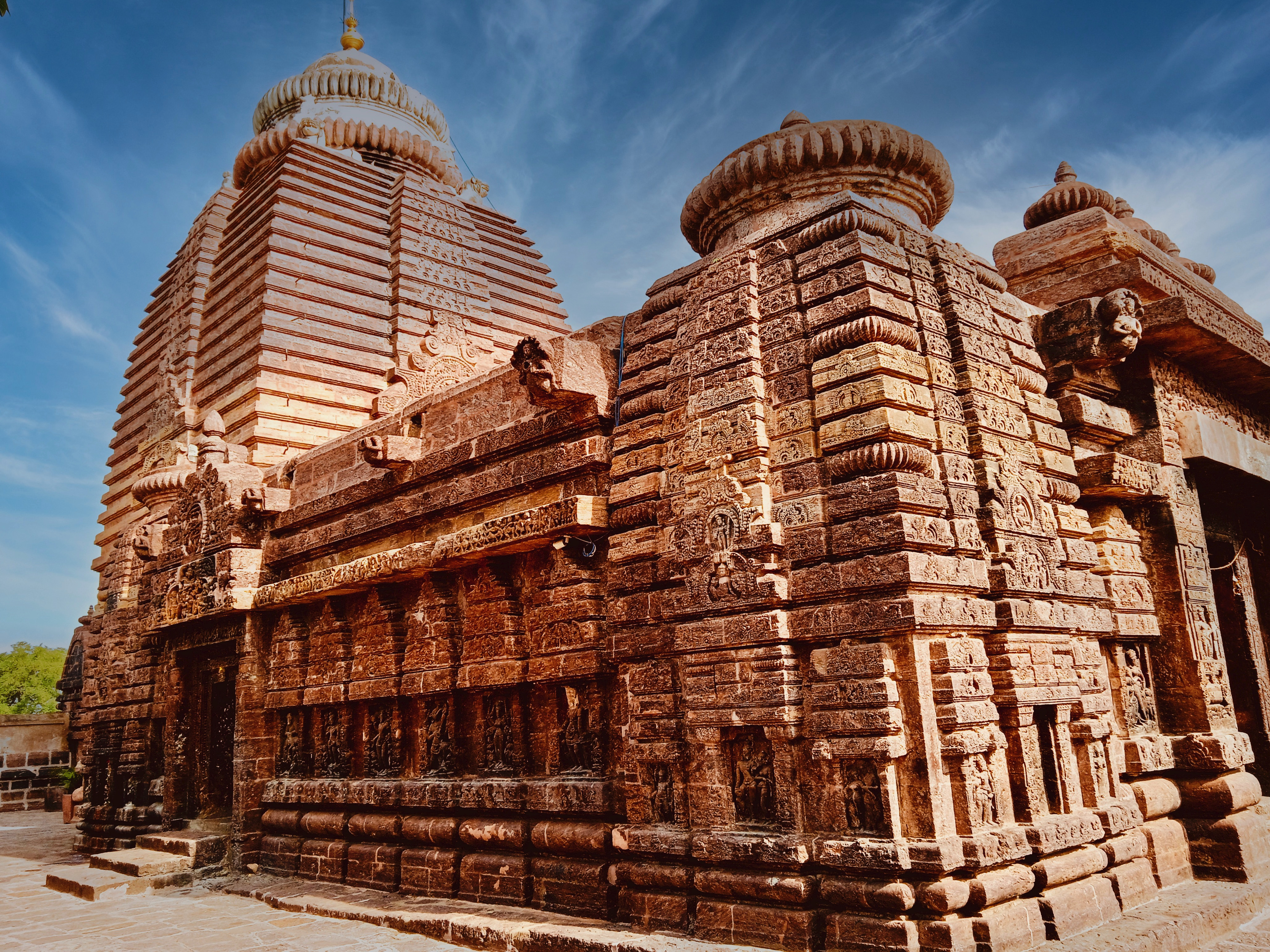
Temple structures

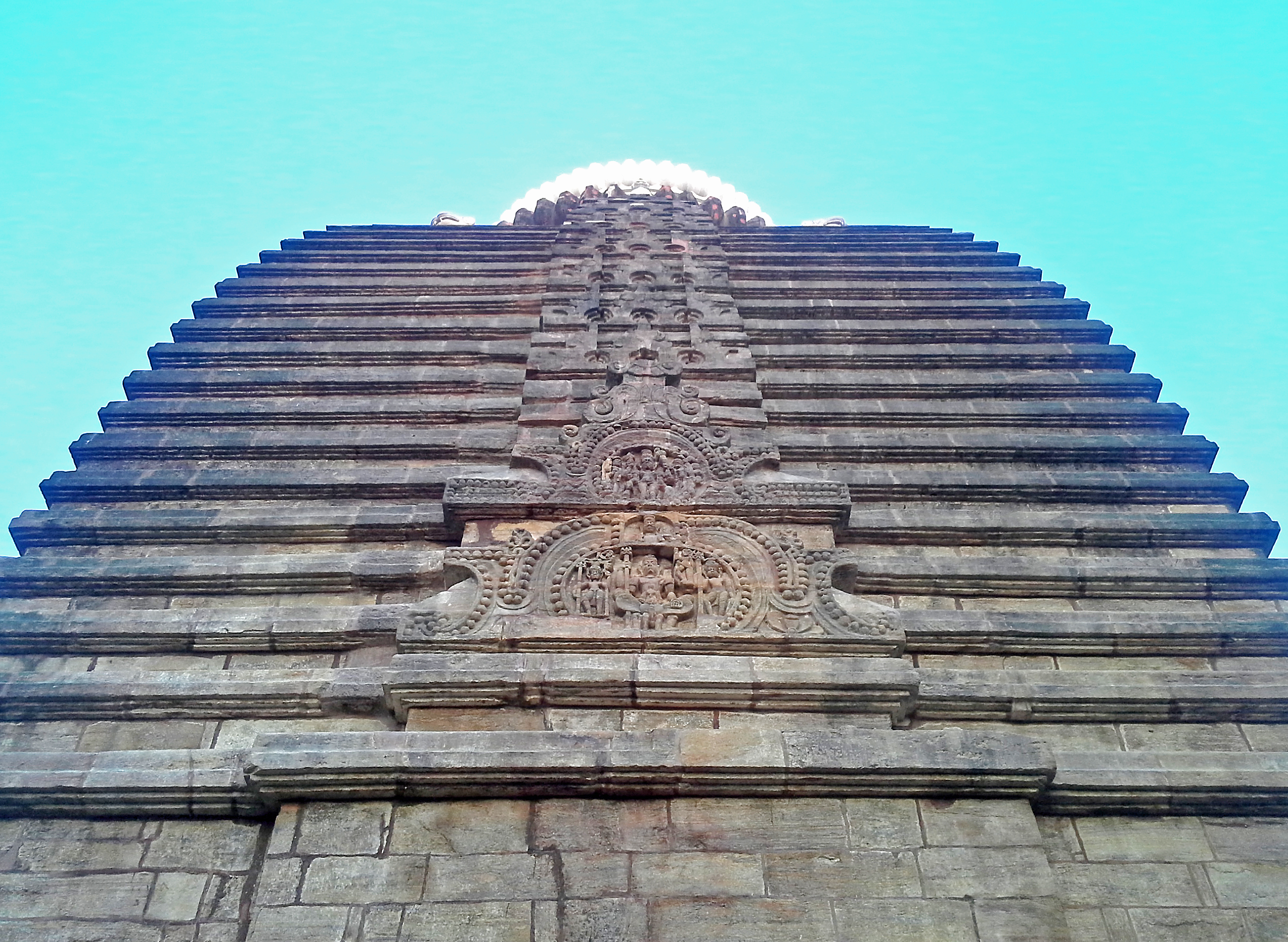
A dome at the Sri Mukhalingam Temple complex

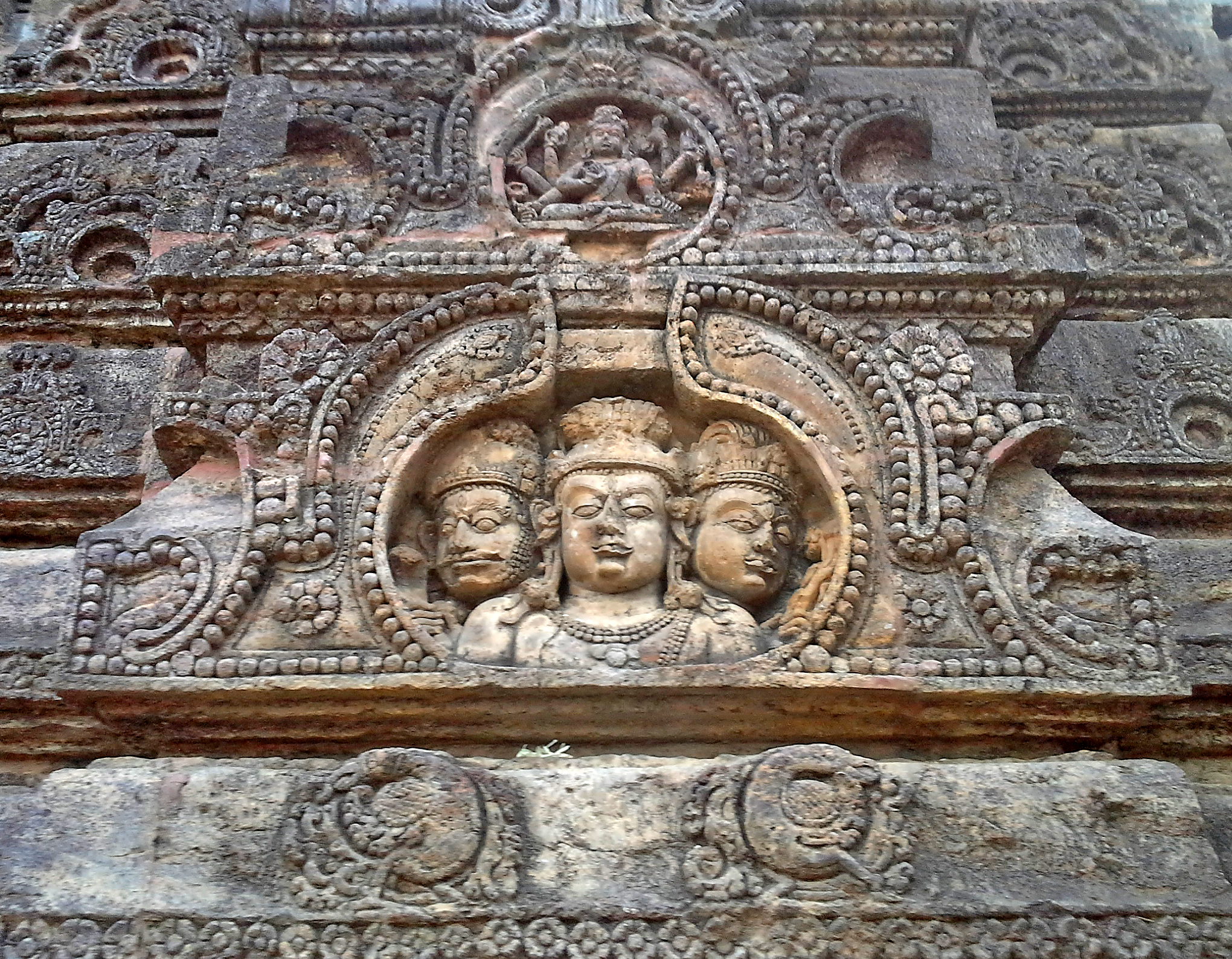
A relief of the Trimurti on a dome at the Sri Mukhalingam Temple complex

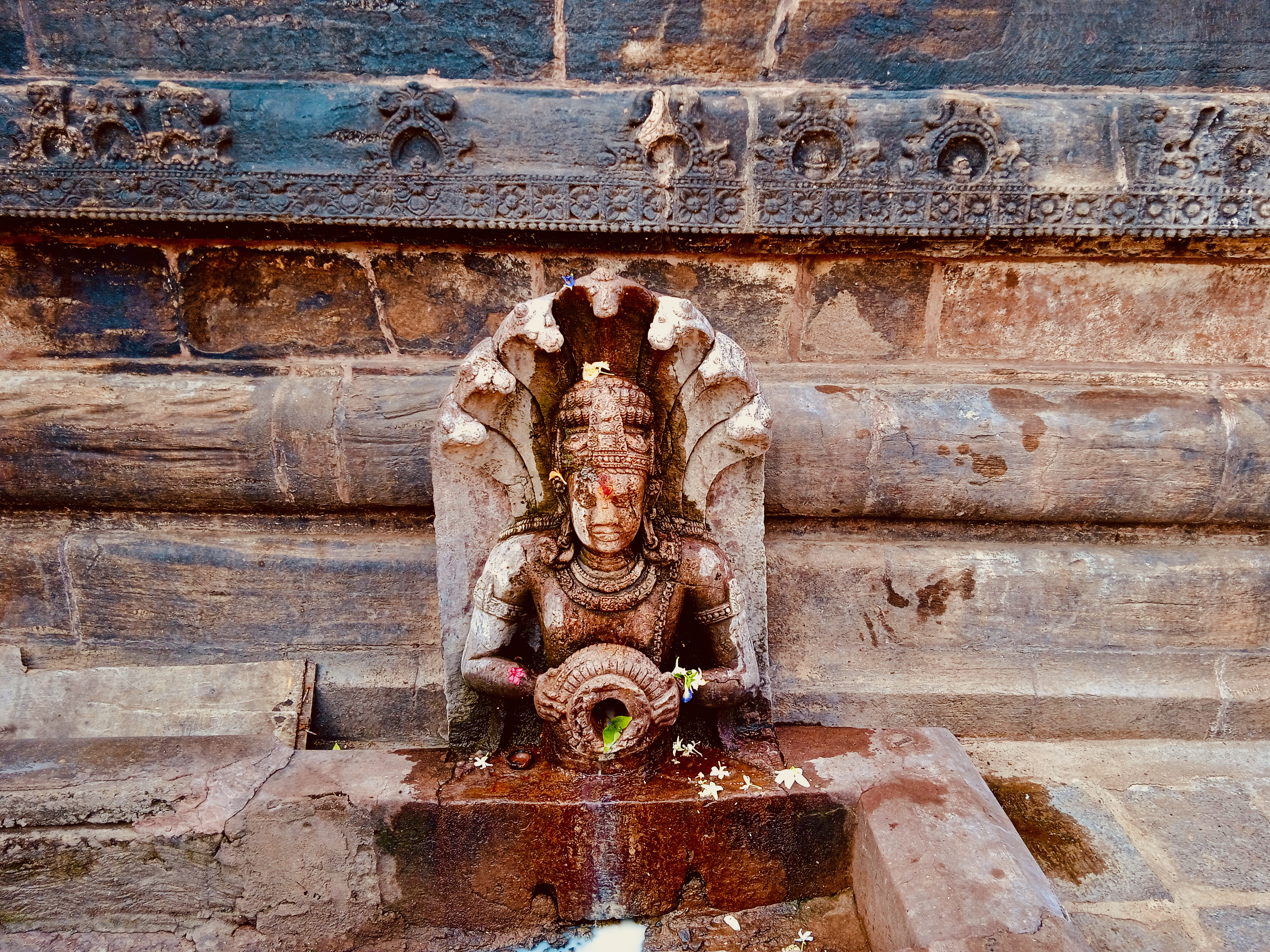
Relief carving forming a drainage feature at the Sri Mukhalingam Temple complex
