= Tilaru =

- Village
- Interactive map of Tilaru
- Location in Andhra Pradesh, India Tilaru (India)
- Coordinates: 18°29′00″N 84°05′00″E
- Country: India
- State: Andhra Pradesh
- District: Srikakulam

Population (2001)
  - Total: 3,063

Languages
  - Official: Telugu
- Time zone: UTC+5:30 (IST)
- Lok Sabha constituency: Srikakulam

Tilaru is a village located in Kotabommali mandal in Srikakulam district, Andhra Pradesh, India.

== Geography ==
Tilaru is located at 18.4833°N 84.0833°E. It has an average elevation of 12 meters (42 feet).

== Demographics ==
According to Indian census, 2001, the demographic details of Tilaru is as follows:

- Total Population: 3,063 in 676 Households
- Male Population: 1,552 and Female Population: 1,511
- Children Under 6-years of age: 381 (Boys - 180 and Girls - 201)
- Total Literates: 1,290

== Features ==
- Tilaru railway station is located on Howrah-Chennai mainline. Some long-distance trains halt at Tilaru station. Tilaru is nearest railway station to Narasannapeta town. The Narasannapeta town is on National Highway No 5 and it is only four kilometres from Tilaru. Autorickshaws (three-wheelers) and tri-cycle carriages are available at Tilaru railway station from where one can go to the nearest public transport bus station.
- The major communities in the village are Pollinati Velama and Devanga (weavers).
- Tilaru village is a Grama panchayat. It contains one Zilla Parishad High School, 3 MPE Schools, Govt BC Boys Hostel and Primary Health Center.
- Tilaru village has 3 temples : they are Sri Jagannadha Swami Temple, Sri Sivalingeswara temple, and Venkateswara Temple.
- Tilaru Junction is in Jalumuru mandal, it is a good junction for surrounding Kotabommali mandal villages Tumbayya peta, Narayanavalsa, Tilaru and Jalumuru mandal villages Chinnadugam, Rayapadu, Kotturu etc.
- "SRI MUKHALINGAM Temple" People called as Dakshin Kasi, is around 15 km from Tilaru railway station. The pilgrims will get down at Tilaru railway station and visit the famous temple.

Postal Address :Tilaru village, Kotabommali mandal, in Srikakulam Dist PIN 532 474
