= Urlam =

- village
- Interactive map of Urlam
- Location in Andhra Pradesh, India Urlam (India)
- Coordinates: 18.435177°N 83.98918°E
- Country: India
- State: Andhra Pradesh
- District: Srikakulam

Population (2001)
  - Total: 3,343

Languages
  - Official: Telugu
- Time zone: UTC+5:30 (IST)

Urlam village is located in Narasannapeta mandal in Srikakulam district, Andhra Pradesh, India.

== Demographics ==
As of 2001 Indian census, the demographic details of Urlam village is as follows:

- Total Population: 3,343 in 793 Households
- Male Population: 1,712 and Female Population: 1,631
- Children Under 6-years of age: 425 (Boys - 229 and Girls - 196)
- Total Literates: 1,810

== Features ==
The Urlam Samsthanam can be compared to the Kasi in promoting Sanskrit studies during the last century. Raja Kandukuri Bala Surya Prasada Rao Bahadur (Devidi Samsthanam) The Raja Saheb of Urlam did yeomen service to saivites through their munificent donations. The Kings of this Samsthanam have ancestrally been Niyogi Telugu Brahmins, Tamil Iyers and not Kshatriyas or Rajus. Urlam railway station is located on Howrah-Chennai mainline. Passenger trains that run from Palasa towards Visakhapatnam halt at Urlam station. Ramalayam is there at Chintuvanipeta Road.

== Facilities ==
Roads

Urlam is serviced by roads from Narasannapeta (9 kilometres or 5.6 miles distant) and Srikakulam (20 kilometres or 12 miles distant).

Train

Passenger trains that run from Palasa towards Visakhapatnam via Urlam railway station.

School

Urlam hosts a Government Elementary School for class I to V, and a Government Z.P. High School for class VI to X. There is also Gurukula Vidhyalay for class L.K.G. to X located in nearby village Jaggunaidu peta.

Colleges

Urlam has govt girls' college inter.Mpc& bipc of its own, but several are available in the adjacent Srikakulam district.

Villages in Urlam Panchayat

Urlam, Chintuvanipeta, Jaggunaidu Peta, Kummaripeta, Mathalabu Peta, Badduvani Peta

Hospitals

In Urlam one government PHC is available. And some private clinics also there for providing health and treatment for the people in and around of Urlam.

Temples

The Urlam people shows their worship to the God. There are around 14 temples is in Urlam. Some of them are Lord Shiva, Goddess Sri Kota Durga with Kali and Gayatri temple, Sri Anjaneya temple, Sadguru Sri Sai Baba temple, Sri Lakshmi Narasimha swami temple, and village Goddess Sri Asiritalli temple and Sri Krishna Temple and Sri Rama Temple and Sri kanaka Maha lakshmi temple and Sri Subrahmanyaswami temple and lakshmi Temple .,
