= Harishchandrapuram =

- village
- Interactive map of Harishchandrapuram
- Location in Andhra Pradesh, India Harishchandrapuram (India)
- Coordinates: 18.479212°N 84.121649°E
- Country: India
- State: Andhra Pradesh
- District: Srikakulam

Languages
  - Official: Telugu
- Time zone: UTC+5:30 (IST)
- Postal code: 532430
- Vehicle registration: AP39

Harichandapuram is an Indian village and panchayat, located in Kotabommali mandal in Srikakulam district, Andhra Pradesh, India.

== Demographics ==
According to Indian census, 2001, the demographic details of Harichandrapuram village is as follows:

- Total Population: 4,324 in 970 Households
- Male Population: 2,138 and Female Population: 2,186
- Children Under 6-years of age: 614 (Boys - 303 and Girls - 311)
- Total Literates: 1,935

== Assembly constituency ==
Harishchandrapuram is an assembly constituency in Andhra Pradesh.

List of Elected Members:

- 1967 - Krishna Murthy Kinjarapu
- 1972 and 1978 - Kannipally Appla Narasimha Bhuktha
- 1983, 1985, 1989 and 1994 - Yerrannaidu Kinjarapu.
- 1999 and 2004 - Atchan Naidu Kinjarapu.

== Transport ==
Panchadama Kshetram Harischandrapuram is located on National Highway 16 (India). Harishchandrapuram railway station is in Chennai-Howrah mainline of East Coast Railway, Indian Railways. Passenger trains that run from Palasa towards Visakhapatnam halt at Harishchandrapuram station.

APSRTC Runs buses to Harischandrapuram Junction, which is located on National Highway 16 (India). Panchadama Kshetram Harishchandrapuram railway station is 3 kilometers far away from Harishchandrapuram village. Harishchandrapuram junction on National Highway 16 (India) is 2 kilometers away from Harishchandrapuram village.

APSRTC Bus from Tekkali - Ummilada village and Ummilada village - Narasannapeta travel through this village.

Remaining APSRTC busses, Autos, taxis are available at Harishchandrapuram junction, Which is located on National Highway 16 (India).
