= Vaddangi =

Coordinates: 18°58′N 83°47′E

- Village
- Interactive map of Vaddangi
- Location in Andhra Pradesh, India
- Country: India
- State: Andhra Pradesh
- District: Parvathipuram Manyam

Population (2011)
  - Total: 2,000

Languages
  - Official: Telugu
- Time zone: UTC+5:30 (IST)
- PIN: 532456
- Telephone code: 08946
- Vehicle registration: AP-30
- Lok Sabha constituency: Aruku
- Vidhan Sabha constituency: Palakonda
- Few Modifications By BVS

Vaddangi is a village in Parvathipuram Manyam district in Andhra Pradesh, India. It is located near Kotturu town. In the 2011 census it had a population of 1206 and 274 households.

The nearest railway station is Srikakulam Road (Amadalavalasa). The nearest airport is Visakhapatnam. It is on a bus route from Srikakulam to Battili, 3 km away from Gurandi.
