= National Highway 326A (India) =

National highway in India

National Highway 326A
- Map of the National Highway in red

Route information
- Length: 143 km (89 mi)

Major junctions
- North end: Mohana
- South end: Narasannapeta

Location
- Country: India
- States: Andhra Pradesh
- Primary destinations: Mohana, Paralakhemundi, Saravakota, Narasannapeta

Highway system
- Roads in India; Expressways; National; State; Asian
← NH 326	→ NH 16

Schematic map of Renumbered National Highways in India

National Highway 326A (NH 326A) is a national highway in that passes through two Indian states of Odisha and Andhra Pradesh. It was formed as a new highway by the up-gradation of former state highways in the two states. The constitution of this highway resulted in cut down of green belt for nearly 15 kilometers and resulted in increasing pollution in this region. It starts at Mohana of Odisha and ends at Narasannapeta road of Andhra Pradesh.

== Route ==
It starts at Mohana in Odisha and passes through Paralakhemundi, Kotabommali junction and ends at Narasannapeta in Andhra Pradesh.

State-wise route length are:

- Odisha - 102.90 km (63.94 mi)
- Andhra Pradesh - 40.00 km (24.85 mi)

== See also ==
- List of national highways in Andhra Pradesh
