= Jalumuru =

- Village
- Interactive map of Jalumuru
- Location in Andhra Pradesh, India Jalumuru (India)
- Coordinates: 18.5167°N 84.0333°E
- Country: India
- State: Andhra Pradesh
- District: Srikakulam
- Talukas: Jalumuru

Languages
  - Official: Telugu
- Time zone: UTC+5:30 (IST)
- PIN: 532432
- Vehicle Registration: AP30 (Former); AP39 (from 30 January 2019)
- Lok Sabha constituency: Srikakulam
- Vidhan Sabha constituency: Narasannapeta

Jalamuru is a village in Srikakulam district of the Indian state of Andhra Pradesh. Jalumuru mandal is bordered by Narasannapeta, Sarubujjili, Saravakota and Kotabommali mandals of Srikakulam district.

== Geography ==
Jalamuru is located at 18.5167°N 84.0333°E. It has an average elevation of 41 meters (137 feet).

== Demographics ==
As of 2001 Indian census, the demographic details of Jalumuru mandal is as follows:

- Total Population: 60,200 in 14,153 Households
- Male Population: 29,734 and Female Population: 30,466
- Children Under 6-years of age: 7,577 (Boys - 3,906 and Girls - 3,671)
- Total Literates: 27,223
