= Kallepalli =

Coordinates: 18°14′15″N 83°55′51″E

Pedda Ganagalla Peta
- Village
- Interactive map of Pedda Ganagalla Peta
- Location in Andhra Pradesh, India
- Country: India
- State: Andhra Pradesh
- District: Srikakulam

Languages
  - Official: Telugu
- Time zone: UTC+5:30 (IST)

Pedda Ganagalla Peta or Ganagalla Peta is a village located around 5 kilometers from Srikakulam town in Andhra Pradesh, India.

River Nagavali near the village Ganagalla Peta. Seervi, Ganagalla Peta had only Pond, Nagavali River Bed.

In the 2011 census it had a population of 2459 in 609 households.
