= Srikakulam Municipal Corporation =

Local civic body in Srikakulam, Andhra Pradesh, India

Srikakulam Municipal Corporation Śrīkākuḷaṁ nagara pālaka Sanstha శ్రీకాకుళం నగర పాలక సంస్థ
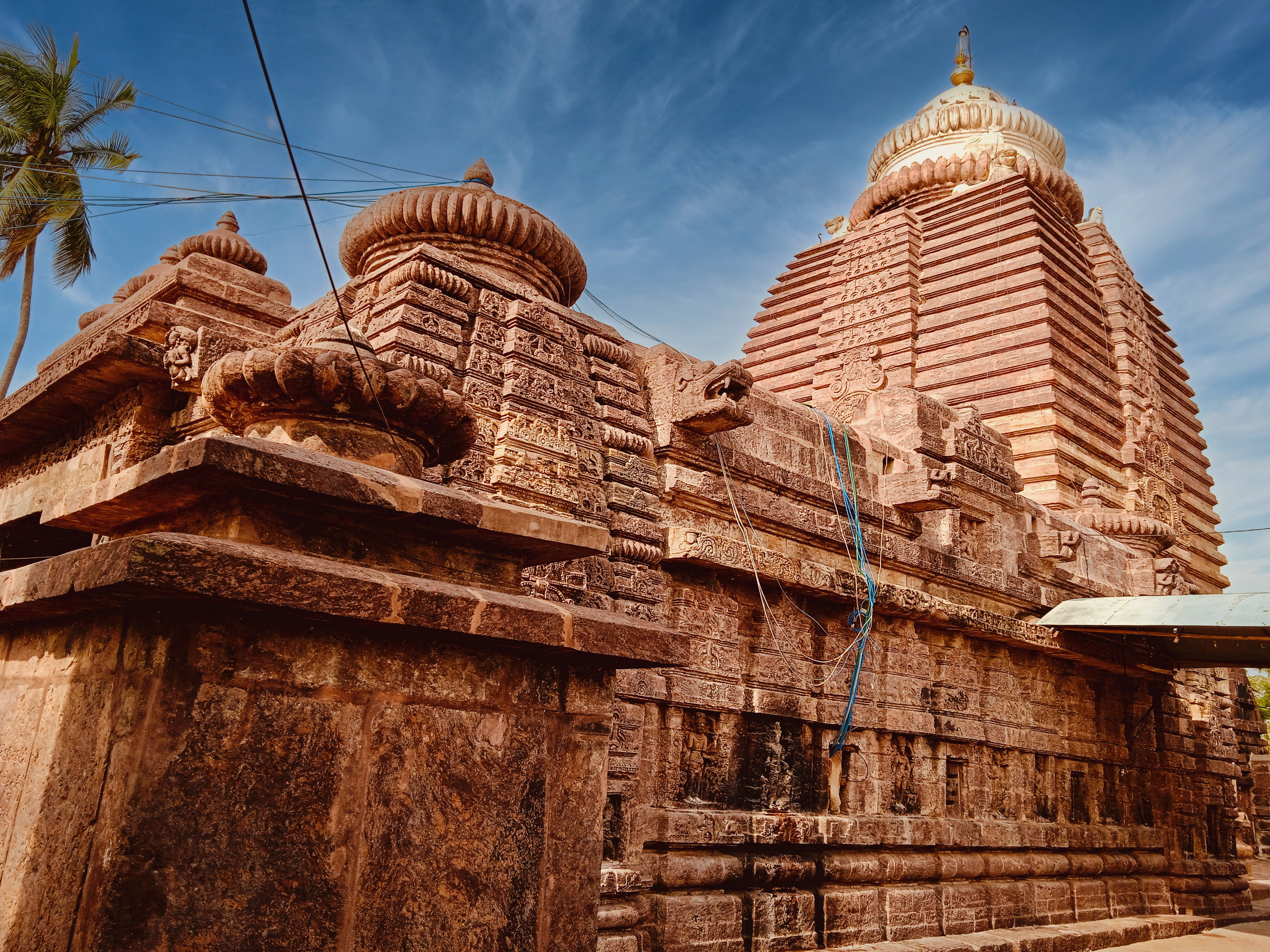
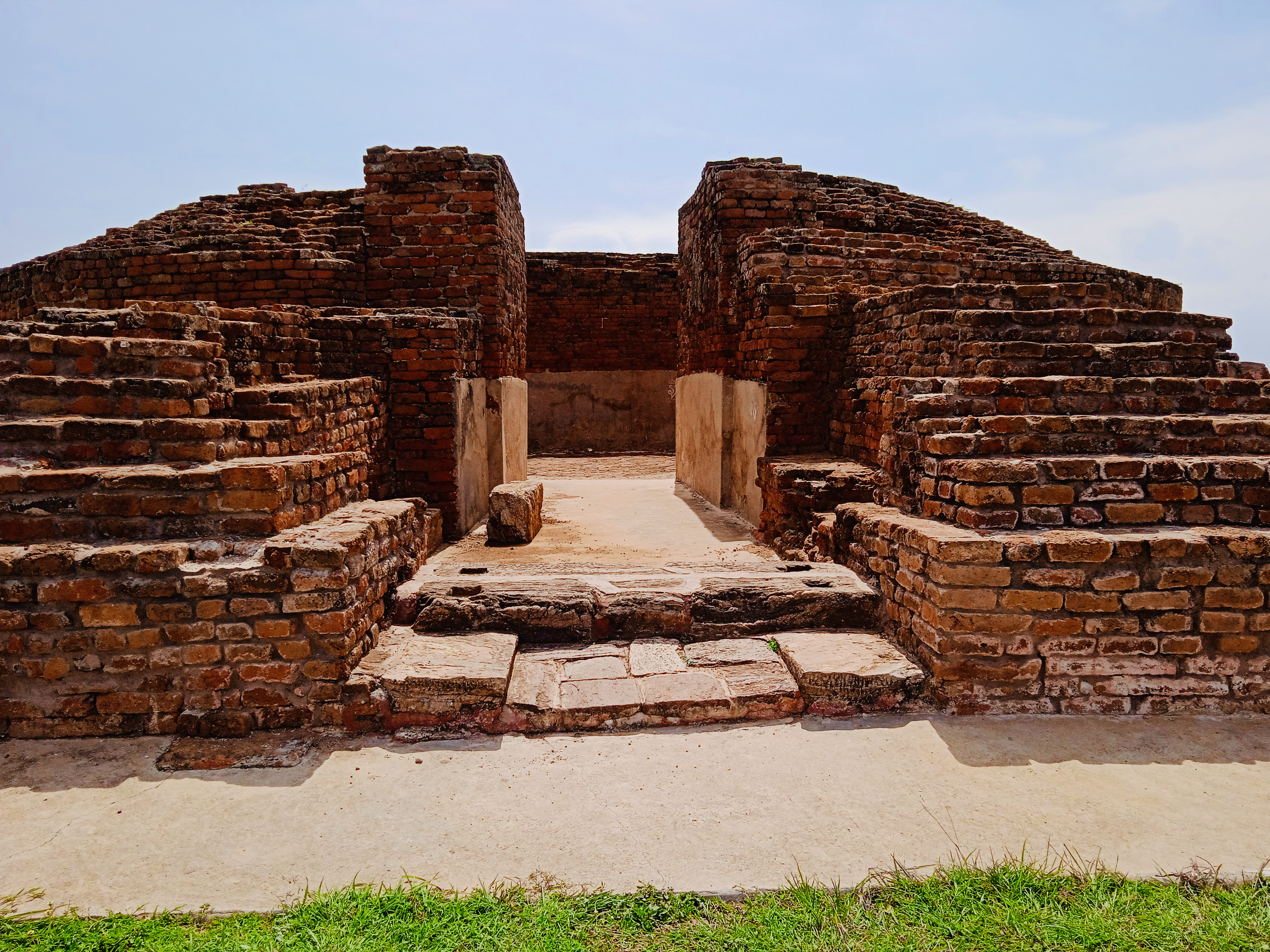
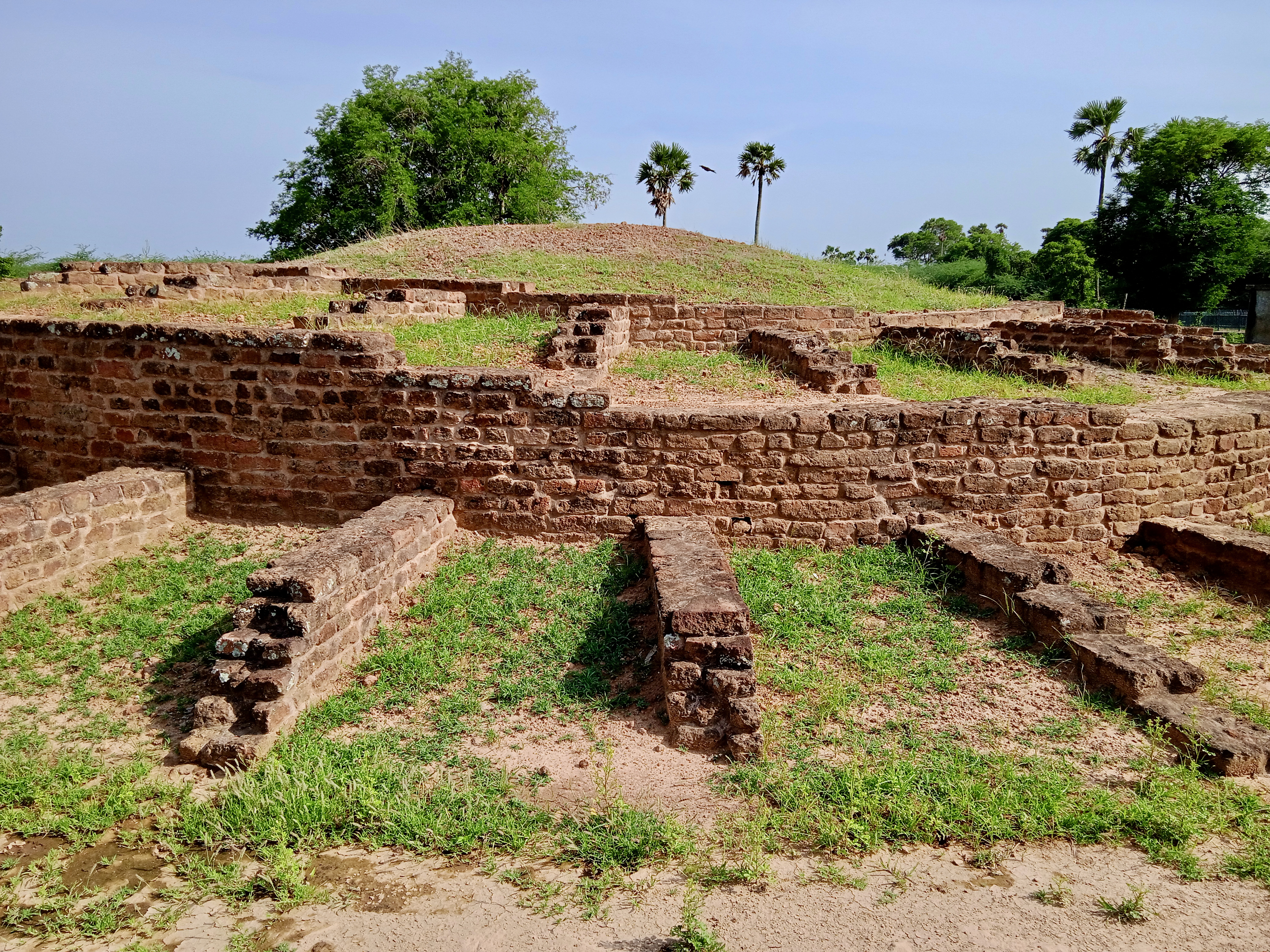
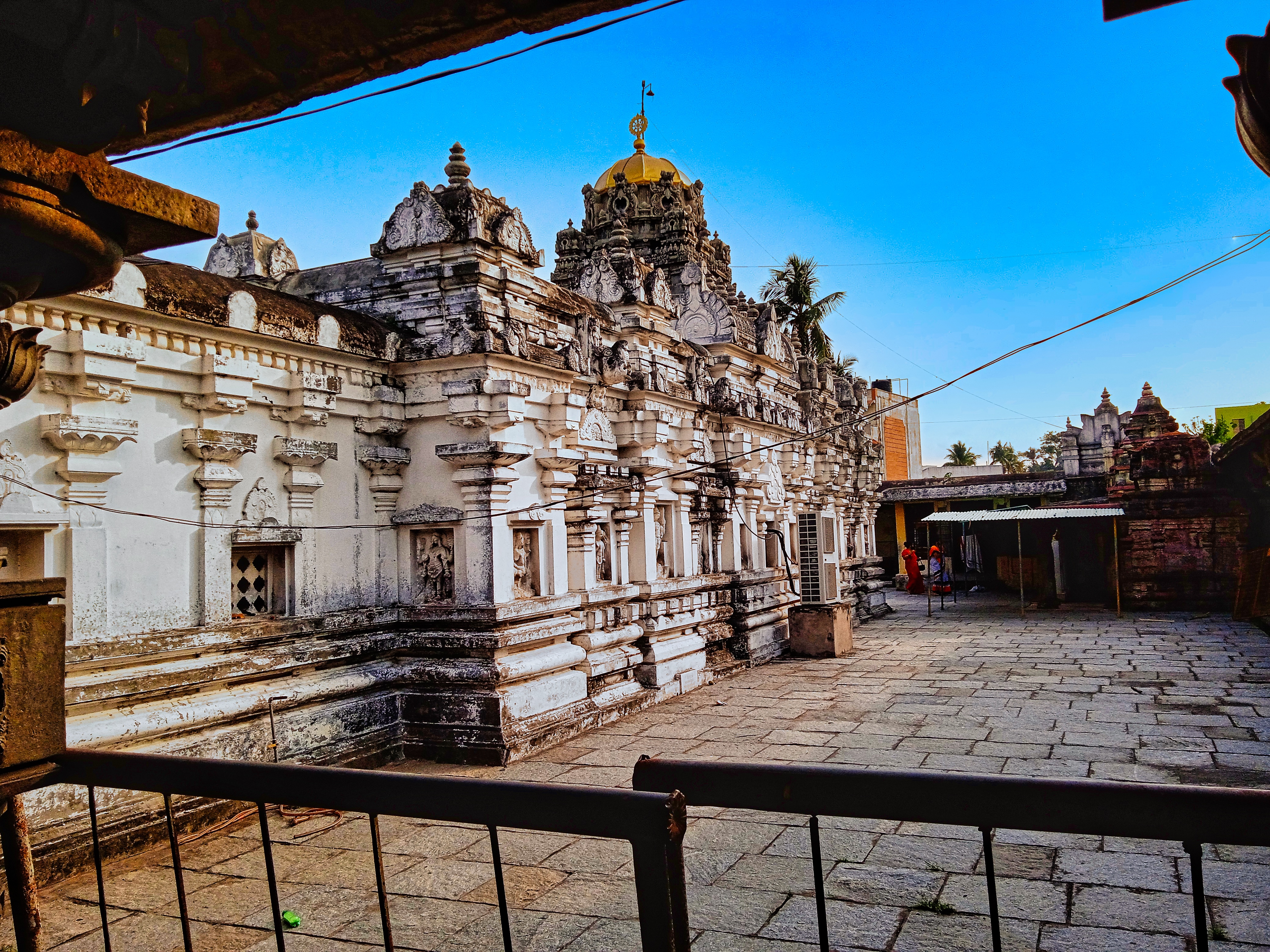
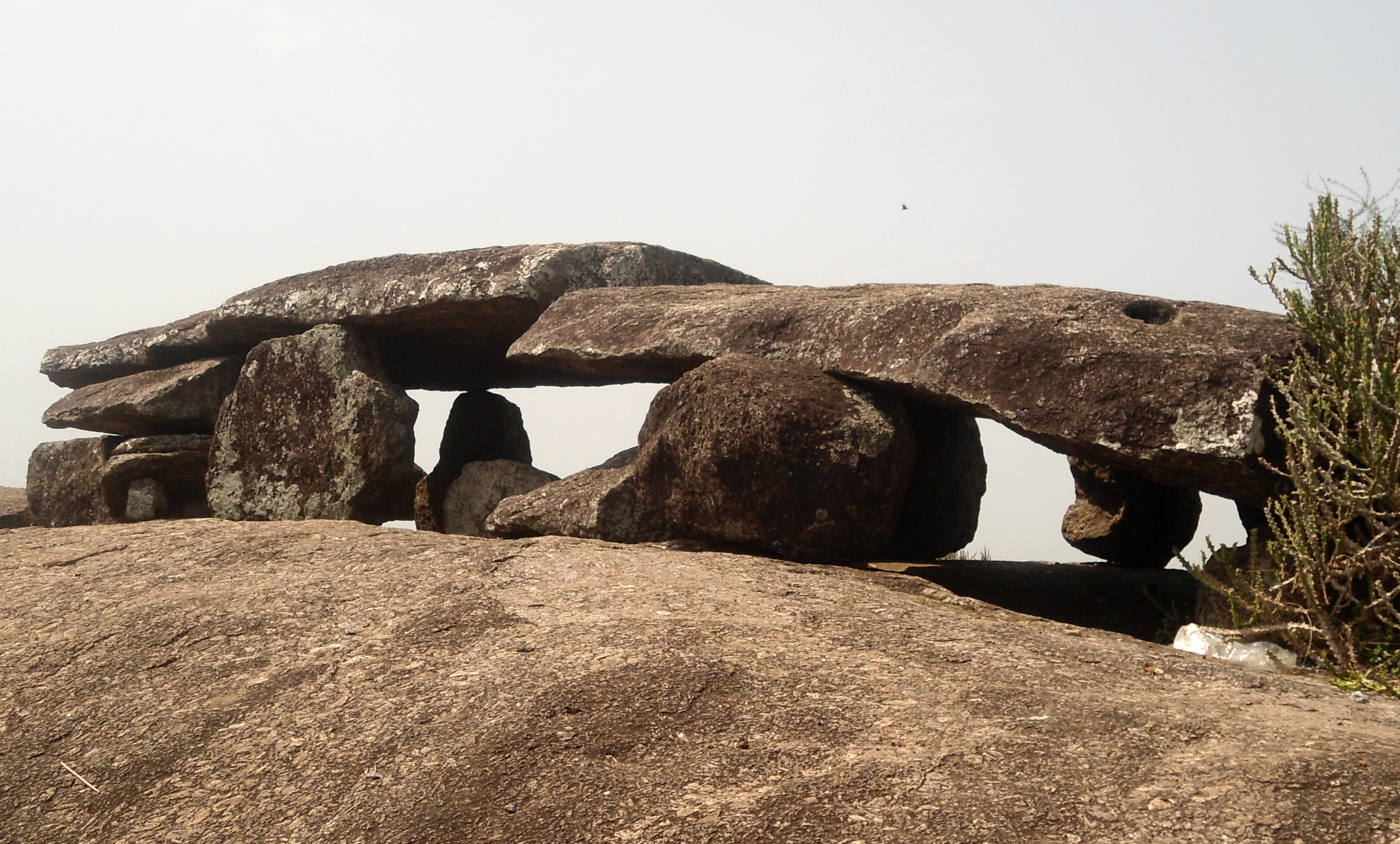

Type
- Type: Municipal Corporation of the Srikakulam

History
- Founded: 2015

Leadership
- Mayor: Vacant (since 18 March 2026)
- Deputy Mayor: Vacant (since 18 March 2026)
- Municipal Commissioner: Hanumanthu Kurma Rao
- Seats: 50

Website
- srikakulam.cdma.ap.gov.in

Srikakulam Municipal Corporation (SMC) is the civic body that governs the city of Srikakulam in the Indian state of Andhra Pradesh. It was formed as a municipality in the year 1856 and was upgraded to corporation on 9 December 2015. Municipal Corporation mechanism in India was introduced during British Rule with formation of municipal corporation in Madras (Chennai) in 1688, later followed by municipal corporations in Bombay (Mumbai) and Calcutta (Kolkata) by 1762. Srikakulam Municipal Corporation Municipal Corporation is headed by the Mayor of city and governed by the Commissioner.

== Jurisdiction ==
It is spread over an area of 20.89 square kilometres (8.07 sq mi) and has a population of 147,015 as per the 2011 Census of India.

== Administration ==
The corporation is administered by an elected body, headed by the Mayor. The present Municipal Commissioner is Hanumanthu Kurma Rao.

== Functions ==
Srikakulam Municipal Corporation Municipal Corporation is created for the following functions:

- Planning for the town including its surroundings which are covered under its Department's Urban Planning Authority .
- Approving construction of new buildings and authorising use of land for various purposes.
- Improvement of the town's economic and Social status.
- Arrangements of water supply towards commercial, residential and industrial purposes.
- Planning for fire contingencies through Fire Service Departments.
- Creation of solid waste management, public health system and sanitary services.
- Working for the development of ecological aspect like development of Urban Forestry and making guidelines for environmental protection.
- Working for the development of weaker sections of the society like mentally and physically handicapped, old age and gender biased people.
- Making efforts for improvement of slums and poverty removal in the town.

== Revenue sources ==
The following are the Income sources for the Corporation from the Central and State Government.

=== Revenue from taxes ===
Following is the Tax related revenue for the corporation.

- Property tax.
- Profession tax.
- Entertainment tax.
- Grants from Central and State Government like Goods and Services Tax.
- Advertisement tax.

=== Revenue from non-tax sources ===
Following is the Non Tax related revenue for the corporation.

- Water usage charges.
- Fees from Documentation services.
- Rent received from municipal property.
- Funds from municipal bonds.

=== Revenue from taxes ===
Following is the Tax related revenue for the corporation.

- Property tax.
- Profession tax.
- Entertainment tax.
- Grants from Central and State Government like Goods and Services Tax.
- Advertisement tax.

=== Revenue from non-tax sources ===
Following is the Non Tax related revenue for the corporation.

- Water usage charges.
- Fees from Documentation services.
- Rent received from municipal property.
- Funds from municipal bonds.
