= Hadubangi =

Village in Odisha, India

Hadubhangi Hadobhangi Haddubhangi
- Village
- Location within Odisha Location within India
- Coordinates: 18°49′51″N 83°58′44″E
- Country: India
- State: Odisha
- District: Gajapati
- Tehsil: Kashinagara

Government
  - Type: Gram panchayat

Area
  - Total: 3.34 km^{2} (1.29 sq mi)
- Elevation: 58 m (190 ft)

Population (2011)
  - Total: 1,124
  - Density: 337/km^{2} (872/sq mi)

Languages
  - Official: Odia
- Time zone: UTC+5:30 (IST)
- PIN: 761208
- STD code: 06857
- Vehicle registration: OD-20

Hadubangi, also romanized as Hadobhangi or Haddubangi, is a village in Kashinagara Tehsil, Gajapati District, Odisha, India. It is located near the Odia-Andhra Pradesh border, about 13 kilometres west of the district capital Paralakhemundi, and 11 kilometres southeast of the tehsil capital Kashinagara. As of the year 2011, It has a total population of 1,124.

== Geography ==
Hadubhangi is located to the north of Vamsadhara River. Its average elevation is 58 metres above the sea level.

== Demographics ==
According to the 2011 Census of India, there are 291 households within Hadubhangi. Among the 1,124 residents, 586 are male and 538 are female. The total literacy rate is 56.85%, with 395 of the male population and 244 of the female population being literate. Its census location code is 414556.
