= Bhamini =

Coordinates: 18°57′45″N 83°47′35″E

Bhamini (ଭାମିନୀ) is a village and Mandal in Rayagada district, Orissa. It is located in Rayagada Revenue Division. The River Vamsadhara flows through border of Bhamini mandal of Orissa.

== Demographics ==
According to Indian census, 2001, the demographic details of this mandal is as follows:

- Total Population: 41,058 in 9,456 Households.
- Male Population: 20,265 and Female Population: 20,793

Hence F>M

- Children Under 6-years of age: 6,178 (Boys – 3,109 and Girls - 3,069)
- Total Literates: 16,024
