= Battili =

Bathili బతిలి
- Village
- Interactive map of Bathili
- Location in Andhra Pradesh, India
- Coordinates: 19.0110°N 83.7871°E
- Country: India
- State: Andhra Pradesh
- District: Parvathipuram Manyam
- Mandal: Bhamini

Government
  - Type: Panchayati Raj
  - Body: Gram Panchayat
- Elevation: 65 m (213 ft)

Population (2011)
  - Total: 7,264

Languages
  - Official: Telugu
- Time zone: UTC+5:30 (IST)
- PIN: 532456
- Vehicle Registration: AP-39

Bathili (also spelled Battili) is a village in Bhamini Mandal of Parvathipuram Manyam district in the Indian state of Andhra Pradesh. It is situated on the interstate border with Odisha.

== Demographics ==
According to the 2011 Census of India, Bathili is a large village with a total of 1,695 residing families. The village had an official census population of 7,264, consisting of 3,556 males and 3,708 females. Children aged 0–6 numbered 743, making up 10.23% of the total population. Based on subsequent regional demographic growth patterns, the population is estimated to have grown to approximately 8,500–8,700.

In 2011, the average sex ratio of Bathili was 1,043 females per 1,000 males, which was higher than the national average. The child sex ratio stood at 1,147.

The literacy rate of Bathili stands at 63.17%. Male literacy stands at 72.90%, while female literacy is 53.73%.

Under the Constitution of India and the Panchayati Raj Act, Bathili village is administered by a Sarpanch (village head), who is an elected representative.

== Geography ==
Bathili is situated on the interstate border between Odisha and Andhra Pradesh. It shares borders with the village of Katragada in Andhra Pradesh, and the adjacent villages of Singubai and Jagannathpur across the state line in Odisha.

The Vamsadhara River flows adjacent to the village. Bathili marks the geographic point where the river flows out of the state of Odisha and enters Andhra Pradesh.

== Culture ==
Due to its geographic location on the state border, the local population practices a blend of Odia and Telugu cultures.

The village features a prominent Santoshi Mata temple located near the bus station, which attracts visitors from neighboring regions every Friday for darshan, pooja, and ujyapana rituals. Annually, ten days before the festival of Holi, the Santoshi Ma (Amma) Jatara (Odia: ସନ୍ତୋଷୀ ମା ଯାତରା; Telugu: సంతోషీ ଅమ్మా ଯﺎତراء) festival is celebrated.

A Church of Christ is also located in the village, serving a section of the local population, including members of local tribal communities who have converted to Christianity.

== Transport ==
Bathili is connected by regional bus services to Srikakulam, Palakonda, Visakhapatnam, Bhimavaram, Parvathipuram, and Rayagada. Buses run from the Srikakulam bus station to Bathili every hour until 7:30 PM.

The nearest railway station is Gunupur (GNPR), located 18 kilometres (11 mi) away in Odisha. The nearest major railway junction is Srikakulam Road (CHE), located in Amadalavalasa, Andhra Pradesh.

== Economy ==
The primary crops cultivated in and around the village include paddy, cotton, tamarind, and turmeric.

== Education ==
Primary and secondary school education is provided by both government and private institutions under the state's Department of School Education. The mediums of instruction in these schools are English, Telugu, and Odia.
