= Challavanipeta =

- Village
- Interactive map of Challavanipeta
- Location in Andhra Pradesh, India
- Coordinates: 18.5052395°N 84.0628505°E
- Country: India
- State: Andhra Pradesh
- District: Srikakulam

Government
  - Type: Gram Panchayat

Area
  - Total: 38.23 km^{2} (14.76 sq mi)

Languages
  - Official: Telugu
- Time zone: UTC+5:30 (IST)
- PIN: 532432
- Vehicle Registration: AP30 (Former) AP39 (from 30 January 2019)

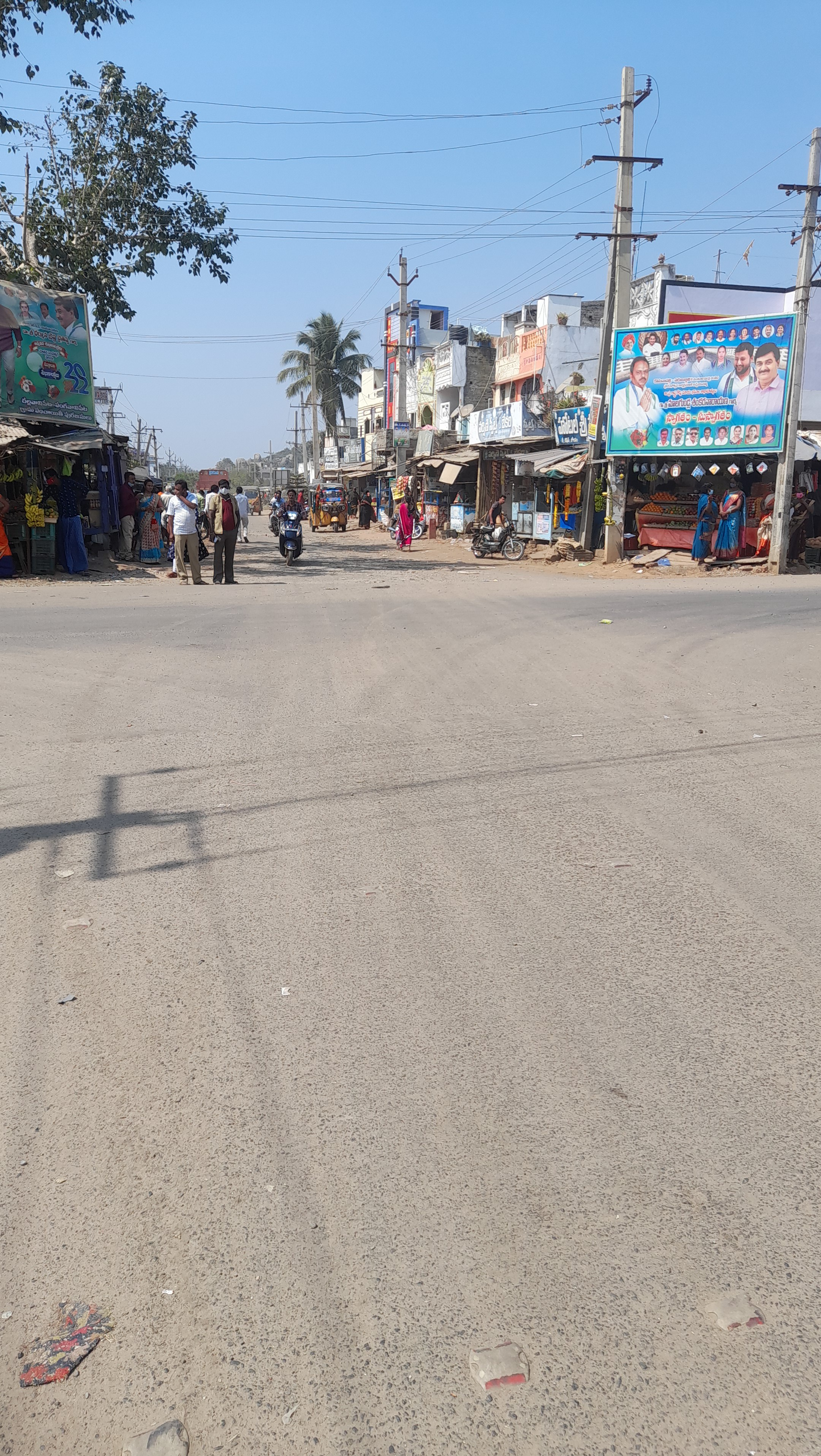
Challavanipeta Junction

Challavanipeta is a village in Srikakulam district in Andhra Pradesh, India.

This village is located near National Highway 326A and Andhrapradesh State Highway 106.
