= Kotabommali =

- Village
- Interactive map of Kotabommali
- Location in Andhra Pradesh, India Kotabommali (India)
- Coordinates: 18.5333°N 84.1667°E
- Country: India
- State: Andhra Pradesh
- District: Srikakulam
- Talukas: Kotabommali

Population (2011)
  - Total: 8,941

Languages
  - Official: Telugu
- Time zone: UTC+5:30 (IST)
- PIN: 532195
- Vehicle Registration: AP30 (Former); AP39 (from 30 January 2019)
- Lok Sabha constituency: Srikakulam
- Vidhan Sabha constituency: Tekkali

Kotabommali is a mandal in the Srikakulam district of the Indian state of Andhra Pradesh.

== Geography ==
Kotabommali is located at 18.5333°N 84.1667°E. It has an average elevation of 28 meters (95 feet).

== Demographics ==
As of 2011 census, had a population of 8,941. The total population constitute, 4,590 males and 4,351 females —a sex ratio of 948 females per 1000 males. 958 children are in the age group of 0–6 years, of which 506 are boys and 452 are girls —a ratio of 893 per 1000. The average literacy rate stands at 71.70% with 5,724 literates, significantly higher than the state average of 67.41%.

== Transport ==
Kotabommali railway station is located on Howrah - Chennai mainline in East Coast Railway, Indian Railways. Kotabommali is located near National Highway 16.

APSRTC bus services includes Kothapeta bus stop, which is situated at Kothapeta junction on NH16. APSRTC runs number of buses to Kothapeta junction (Kota bommali) from far distance places.

List of APSRTC buses available to and from Kothapeta junction (Kotabommali)

Pallevelugu (Ordinary service),

Express, Ultra Deluxe, Super luxury, Indra A/C

APSRTC Runs Buses to Major cities Narasannapeta, Srikakulam, Visakhapatnam, Tuni, Annavaram, Amalapuram, Kakinada, Ravulapalem, Vijayawada, Rajahmundry, Ichapuram, Palasa, Tekkali.

For reservation bus tracking and for Non reservation bus time table from and to Kothapeta refer online portal.
