= Narasannapeta =

- Census Town
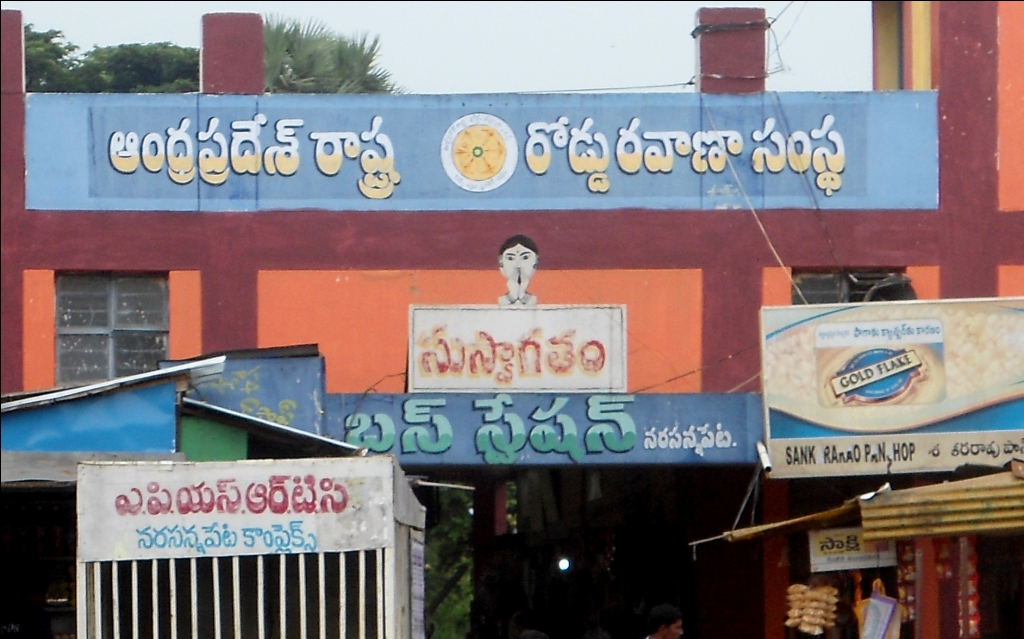
- APSRTC Bus Complex at Narasannapeta

- Location in Andhra Pradesh, India
- Coordinates: 18.4167°N 84.0500°E
- Country: India
- State: Andhra Pradesh
- District: Srikakulam

Government
  - MLA: Dharmana Krishna Das

Area
  - Total: 5.18 km^{2} (2.00 sq mi)

Population (2011)
  - Total: 26,280
  - Density: 5,070/km^{2} (13,100/sq mi)

Languages
  - Official: Telugu
- Time zone: UTC+5:30 (IST)
- PIN: 532421
- Vehicle Registration: AP30 (Former); AP39 (from 30 January 2019)
- Lok Sabha constituency: Srikakulam
- Vidhan Sabha constituency: Narasannapeta

Narasannapeta is a census town in Srikakulam district of the Indian state of Andhra Pradesh. It is the mandal headquarters of Narasannapeta mandal in Srikakulam revenue division. 43 villages are there under the administrative division of Narasannapeta.

Narsannapeta is at 18.4167°N 84.0500°E.

== Demographics ==
The Narasannapeta Census Town had a population of 26,280 of whom 12,890 were males and 13,390 females according to the 2011 Indian census.

The population of children aged 0-6 was 2663, 10.13% of the total population. In Narasannapeta Census Town, the female sex ratio is 1039 against state average of 993. The child sex ratio in Narasannapeta is around 937 compared to the Andhra Pradesh state average of 939. The literacy rate of Narasannapeta city is 79.05%, higher than the state average of 67.02%. In Narasannapeta, male literacy is around 85.86% and female literacy 72.57%.

== Legislative Assembly ==
Narasannapeta is an assembly constituency in Andhra Pradesh. There are 1,29,078 registered voters in Narasannapeta constituency in 1999 elections.
