= Srikakulam =

- District Headquarter; Municipal city
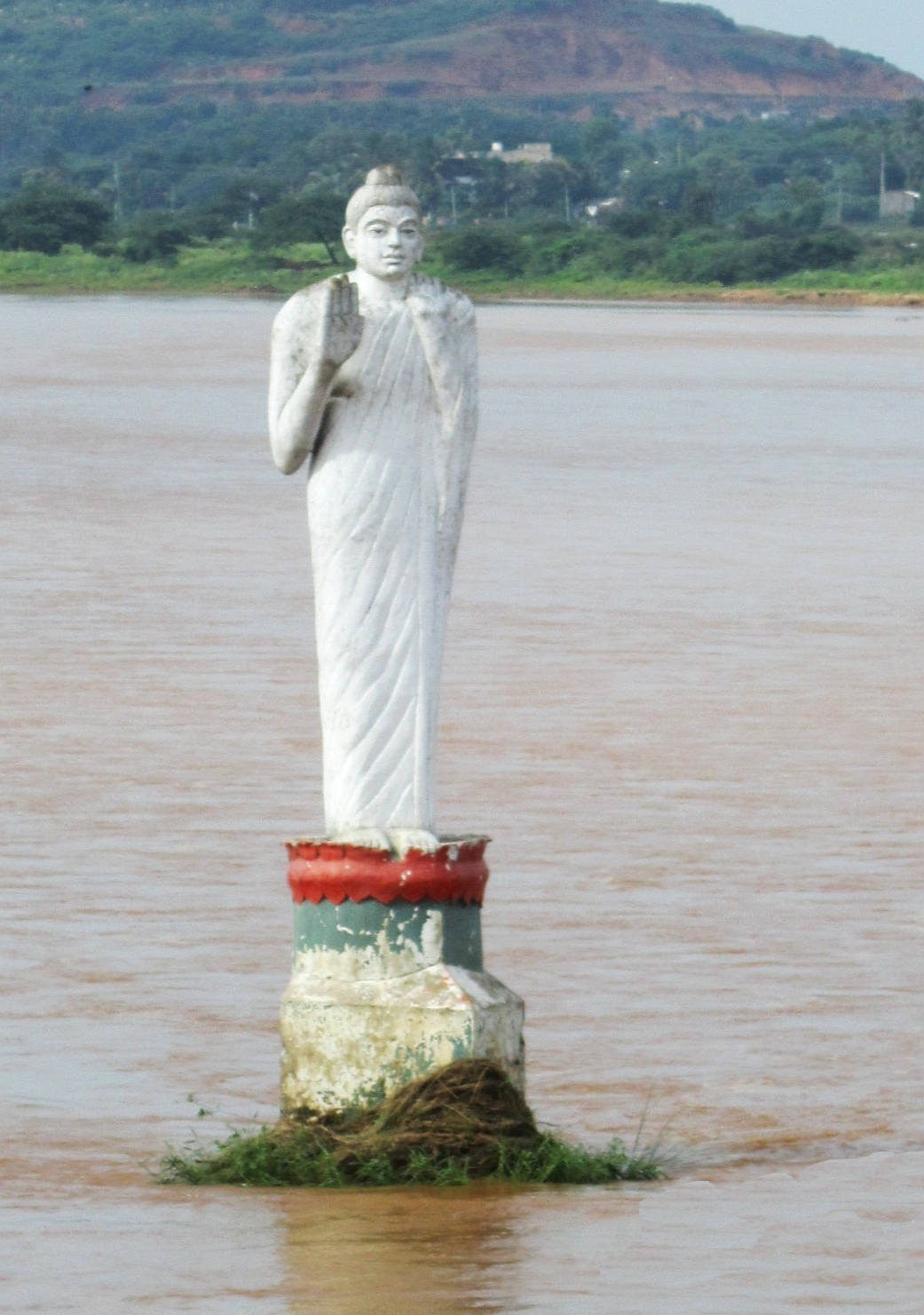
- Buddha statue in Nagavali River
- Nicknames: Chicacole, Sikkole
- Location in Andhra Pradesh, India
- Coordinates: 18.3°N 83.9°E
- Country: India
- State: Andhra Pradesh
- Incorporated (Municipality): 1856
- Incorporated (Corporation): 2015
- Founder: Balarama
- Wards: 36

Government
  - Type: Mayor–Council
  - Body: Srikakulam Municipal Corporation
  - MLAs: Gondu Shankar
  - MP: Kinjarapu Rammohan Naidu

Area
  - District Headquarter Municipal city: 20.89 km^{2} (8.07 sq mi)

Population (2011)
  - District Headquarter Municipal city: 228,025
  - Rank: 22nd (in AP)
  - Metro: 165,735

Literacy

Languages
  - Official: Telugu
- Time zone: UTC+5:30 (IST)
- PIN: 532001, Complete Post Office List
- Telephone Code: +91–8942
- Vehicle registration: AP-30 (former); AP–39 (from 30 January 2019)
- Website: srikakulam.cdma.ap.gov.in

Srikakulam is a city and the headquarters of Srikakulam district in the Indian state of Andhra Pradesh. As of 2011 census, it has a population of 165,735. There are many other places of Buddhist Tourism such as Salihundam, Kalinga Patnam, Dabbaka Vaani Peta, Nagari Peta, Jagati Metta, Singupuram etc. in Srikakulam District. The Buddhist heritage site of Salihundam has some unique features. It has a beautiful star atop a stupa, rock cut massive stupas inside chaitya grihas, brick stupas with wheel pattern plan, votive stupas, inscriptions on the steps leading to the stupas and museum housing over two dozen sculpted statue and figurines of Buddha, Jain Teerthankars and other deities.

== Etymology ==
The city was known as Chicacole before Indian Independence.

== History ==
Srikakulam or Chicacole is of considerable historical significance in the medieval and later history of Kalinga. The early history of Srikakulam dates back to the ages of the Eastern Ganga Dynasty. It came under the direct rule of the Suryavanshis of Nandapur until its annexation by the Golconda Qutb Shahis. Under the Sultans of Golconda, Srikakulam became the headquarters of the North Andhra region and one officer called 'Fouzdar' was appointed to oversee after the administration. The rule of Golconda in the region ended in 1673 with a battle between the king of Jeypore, Viswambhar Dev-I and the Nawab of Chicacole.

Due to the weakening state of Golconda, the fouzdar of Chicacole adopted the title of Nawab and endeavored to establish an independent regime. However, he was defeated by Viswambhar Dev-I, who re-established the rule of Jeypore in the North Andhra regions.

== Demographics ==
As of 2011 Census of India, the city had a population of 146,988. The total population constitute, 73,077 males and 73,911 females —a sex ratio of 1011 females per 1000 males. 11,607 children are in the age group of 1–6 years. The average literacy rate stands at 84.62%, with male literacy at 90.76% and female literacy at 78.61%, and a total of 96,744 literates, significantly higher than the national average of 73.00%.

The Urban agglomeration had a population of 147,015, of which males constitute 73,077, females constitute 73,911 —a sex ratio of 931 females per 1000 males and 12,741 children are in the age group of 0–6 years. There are a total of 115,061 literates with an average literacy rate of 85.71%.

== Climate ==
Srikakulam has a tropical savanna climate (Köppen climate classification Aw).

Climate data for Srikakulam, Andhra Pradesh
Month	Jan	Feb	Mar	Apr	May	Jun	Jul	Aug	Sep	Oct	Nov	Dec	Year
Mean daily maximum °C (°F)	28.8 (83.8)	31.0 (87.8)	33.3 (91.9)	35.5 (95.9)	37.9 (100.2)	36.9 (98.4)	32.9 (91.2)	32.4 (90.3)	32.4 (90.3)	31.3 (88.3)	29.7 (85.5)	28.6 (83.5)	32.6 (90.6)
Mean daily minimum °C (°F)	15.3 (59.5)	20.5 (68.9)	22.8 (73.0)	25.8 (78.4)	27.9 (82.2)	27.4 (81.3)	25.7 (78.3)	25.5 (77.9)	25.6 (78.1)	24.7 (76.5)	21.7 (71.1)	16.6 (61.9)	23.3 (73.9)
Average rainfall mm (inches)	0 (0)	5 (0.2)	4 (0.2)	10 (0.4)	53 (2.1)	126 (5.0)	204 (8.0)	204 (8.0)	162 (6.4)	228 (9.0)	66 (2.6)	13 (0.5)	1,075 (42.4)
Source: en.climate-data.org

Srikakulam has been ranked 22nd best “National Clean Air City” under (Category 3 population under 3 lakhs cities) in India.

== Governance ==
=== Civic administration ===
Srikakulam Municipal Corporation is the civic body of the city, constituted as a municipality in the year 1856. It was upgraded to corporation on 9 December 2015. The jurisdictional area of the corporation is spread over 20.89 km^{2} (8.07 mi^{2}) with 36 election wards.

The Srikakulam urban agglomeration constituents of the city include, Srikakulam municipality, census town of Balaga, fully out growths of Arasavalli, partly outgrowths of Kusulapuram, Thotapalem, Patrunivalasa and Patha Srikakulam (rural). While, Ponugutivalasa of Santhakavati mandal is now a part of Rajam Nagar Panchayat.

=== Politics ===
Srikakulam is a part of Srikakulam (Assembly constituency) for Andhra Pradesh Legislative Assembly. Gondu Sankar is the present MLA of the constituency from Telugu Desham Party. It is also a part of Srikakulam (Lok Sabha constituency) which was won by Rammohan Naidu Kinjarapu of Telugu Desam Party.

== Culture and tourism ==
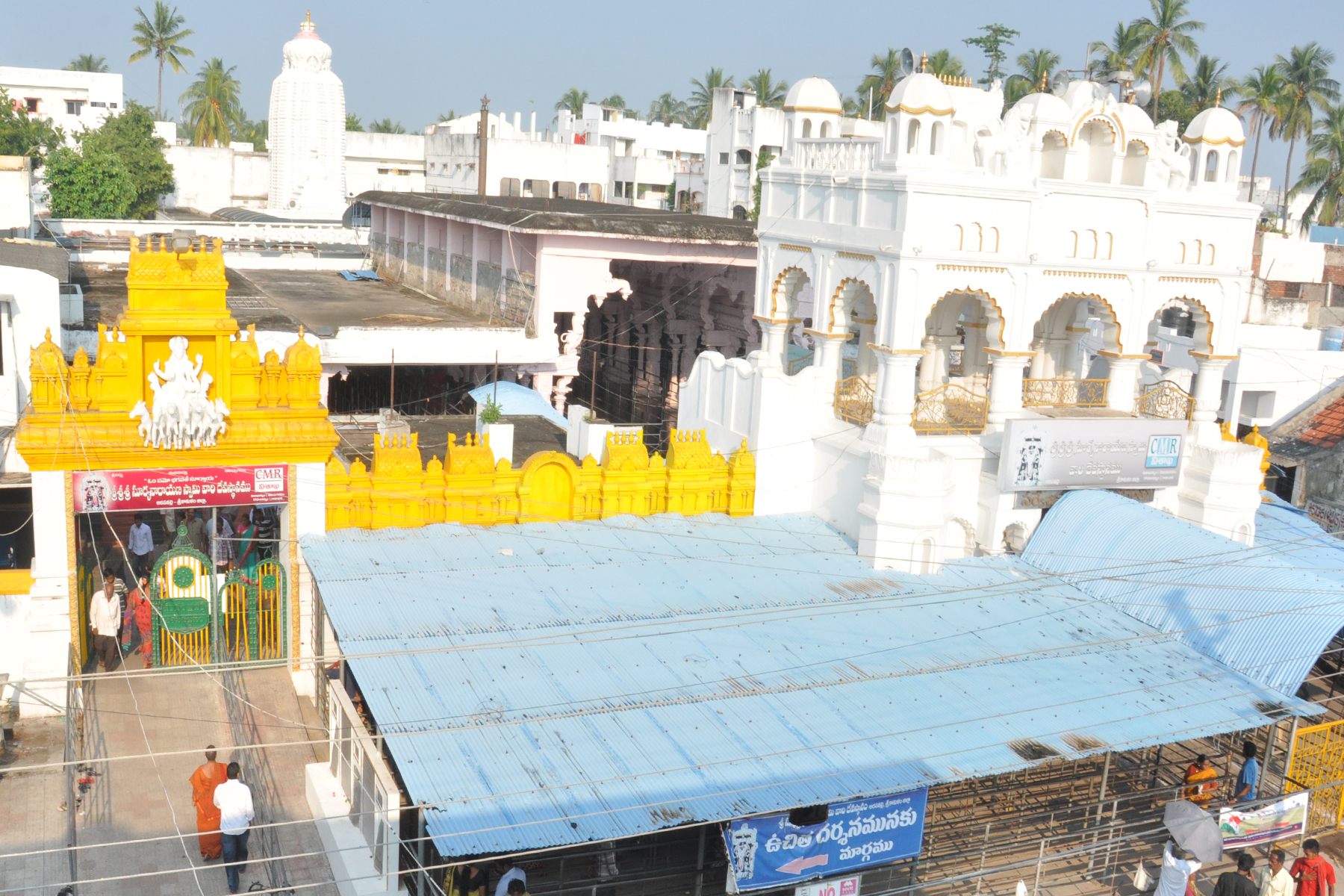
Sri Suryanarayana Swamy Temple, Arasavalli

The Arasavalli Sun temple is the abode of Sun god, the idol of the temple was installed by Lord Indra and is one of the two sun temples in the country.

== Education ==
The primary and secondary school education is imparted by government, aided and private schools of the School Education Department of the state. The medium of instruction followed by different schools are English and Telugu.

== Transport ==
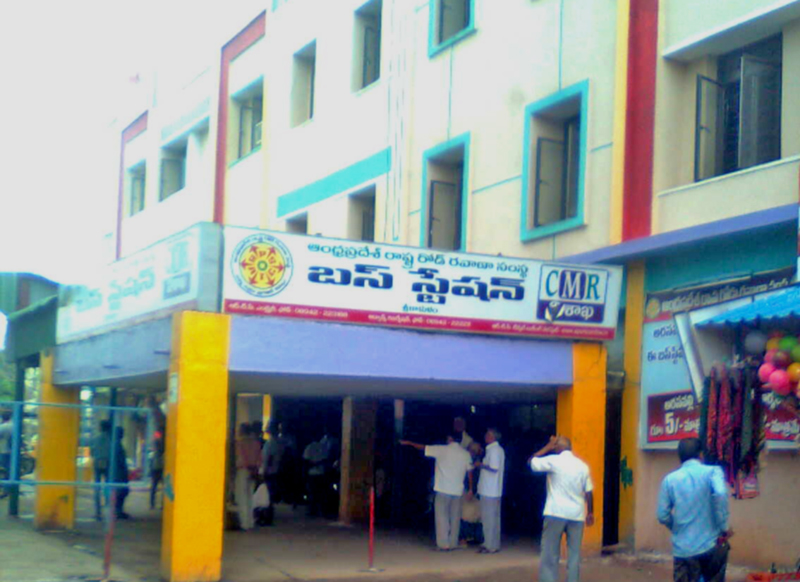

The Andhra Pradesh State Road Transport Corporation operates bus services from Srikakulam bus station. National Highway 16 (India), a part of Golden Quadrilateral highway network, bypasses the city.

Srikakulam Road railway station(station code:CHE) is an Indian railway station in Amudalavalasa near to Srikakulam town of Andhra Pradesh. It lies on the Khurda Road-Visakhapatnam section of Howrah-Chennai main line and is administered under Waltair railway division of East Coast Railway zone.

The Government of Andhra Pradesh is planning to build Srikakulam Airport here.

== Sports ==
International athletes like Karnam Malleswari (weightlifting) and Korada Mrudula (running, 400 m) are from Srikakulam. Kodi Ram Murthy Stadium near Govt. Degree College is a multi-purpose sporting facility in the town. In 1991, an unofficial cricket match was played between Sunil Gavaskar XI and Kapil Dev XI with both the legends being a part of the game as well. The only swimming pool (maintained by SAAP) is located in Santhinagar.

== See also ==
- List of cities in Andhra Pradesh by population
- List of municipalities in Andhra Pradesh
