= Orissa Tributary States =

Group of princely states in Odisha, India

- Group of princely states of British India
- 1888–1947
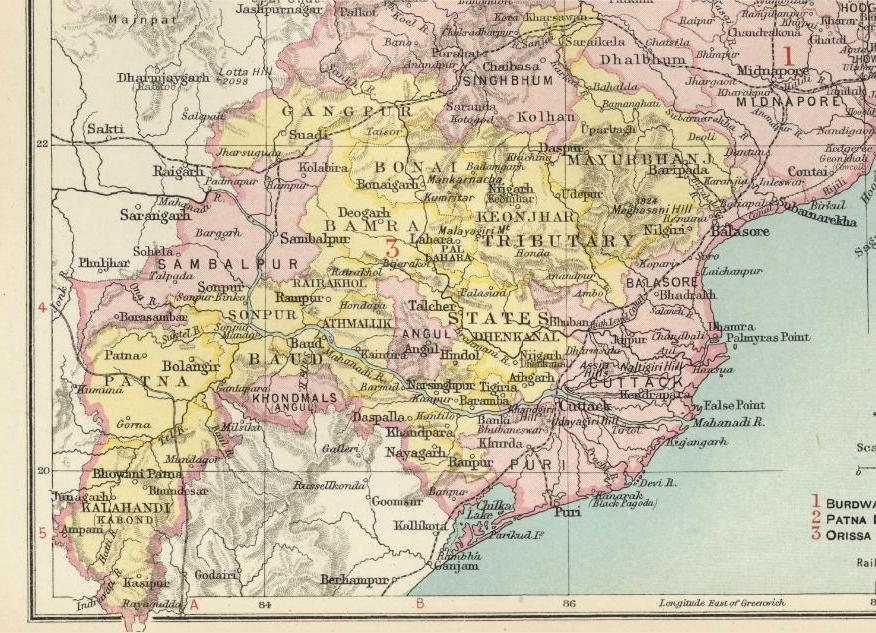
- Orissa Tributary States in a 1901 map of the Imperial Gazetteer of India
- History
  - Orissa chiefs put under the control of a superintendent: 1888
  - Accession to the Indian Union: 14 November 1947
Preceded by	Succeeded by
Agencies of British India	Eastern States Union

The Orissa Tributary States, also known as the Garhjats (ଗଡ଼ଜାତ) or the Orissa Feudatory States, were a group of princely states of British India now part of the present-day Indian state of Odisha.

The Orissa Tributary States were located in the Garhjat Hills, the hilly and former heavily forested region of eastern Orissa, on the border with present-day Chhattisgarh and Jharkhand states.

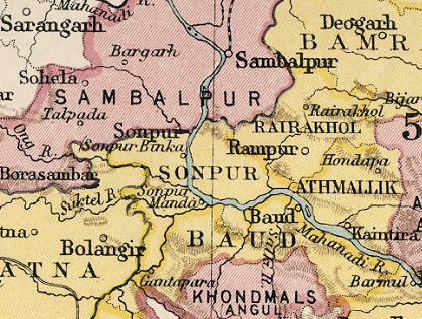
Sonepur, Baudh, Rairakhol and Athmallik Feudatory States

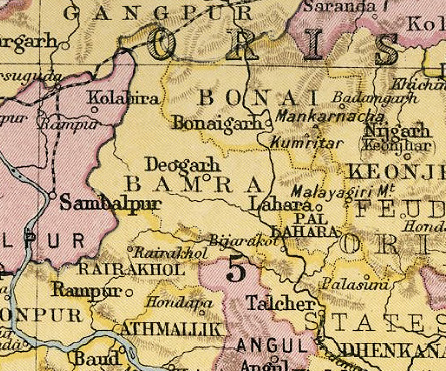
Gangpur, Bonai, Bamra, Pal Lahara and Talcher Feudatory States

== History ==
In the 18th century, the entire region came under the control of the Maratha Empire, in particular the Bhonsle maharajas of Nagpur. Meanwhile, the British had become established in Bengal, and were expanding their influence into the lowland tracts of Orissa. The British and the Marathas came into conflict in the late 18th century, and at the conclusion of the Second Anglo-Maratha War in 1803, the Maharaja of Nagpur ceded Orissa to the British. Some of the former Maratha territory was ruled directly by the British, and attached to the Bengal Presidency; other territories became princely states, under the control of local rulers under a treaty of subsidiary alliance to the British monarch following the annexation in 1803. The local chiefs' status was recognised by the British as 'tributary chiefs' and their estates became the 'Tributary Mahals' of Orissa.

These territories were managed the Political Department and were not subject to any regular Settlement and Revenue system. Originally there were nineteen Tributary States, but two of them were confiscated and annexed by the British; Angul State in 1847 for the rebellion of its Raja when he opposed the British officers that had been sent to suppress the Meriah sacrifice among the Khonds, and Banki State in 1840, after its ruler had been convicted of murder.

The status of the Orissa Tributary States, the largest of which were Mayurbhanj, Keonjhar, Dhenkanal, Baudh, and Nayagarh, was unclear until 1888, when the Secretary of State for India accepted the view that they did not form part of British India, and modified powers were handed over to the Orissa chiefs under the control of a superintendent.

In 1905 five Oriya-speaking states of Bamra, Rairakhol, Sonpur, Patna, and Kalahandi State were added from the Central Provinces and two states, Gangpur and Bonai, from the Chota Nagpur States. With the addition of these states, the total area was 72,638 km^{2} (28,046 sq mi) and the population was 3,173,395 per the 1901 census.

In 1912, the province of Bihar and Orissa was detached from Bengal, and the Orissa Tributary States were under the authority of the governor of Bihar and Orissa. In 1936 Orissa became a separate province, but the Orissa Tributary States were merged into the Eastern States Agency, which was under the direct authority of the Governor-General of India rather than that of the provincial governor. After the Indian independence in 1947, the rulers of the states acceded to the Government of India. They established the Eastern States Union in the same year. Their aim was to establish a unit that would be large enough to exist as a separate state within the Indian Union. But the union failed and the former Orissa Tributary States, except the Oriya speaking princely states of Saraikela and Kharsawan, were integrated into the state of Orissa.

== Princely states ==
The list of princely states under Orissa States Agency:

A. The list of Orissa Tributary States (figure: 1901 Census)
Princely state	Capital	Area	Population
Athgarh State	Athagad	168 sq mi (440 km^{2})	43,784
Athmallik State	Kaintragarh (Athmallik)	730 sq mi (1,900 km^{2})	40,753
Bamra State (Bamanda)	Debagarh		
Baramba State	Baramba	134 sq mi (350 km^{2})	38,280
Baudh State	Boudhgarh	1,264 sq mi (3,270 km^{2})	88,250
Bonai State	Bonaigarh	1,349 sq mi (3,490 km^{2})	38,277
Daspalla State	Dashapalla	568 sq mi (1,470 km^{2})	51,987
Dhenkanal State	Dhenkanal	1,463 sq mi (3,790 km^{2})	273,662
Gangpur State	Sundergarh		
Hindol State	Hindol	312 sq mi (810 km^{2})	47,180
Kalahandi State (Karond)	Bhawanipatna		
Keonjhar State	Kendujhar	3,096 sq mi (8,020 km^{2})	285,758
Khandpara State	Khandapada	244 sq mi (630 km^{2})	69,450
Mayurbhanj State	Baripada	4,236 sq mi (10,970 km^{2})	610,383
Narsinghpur State	Narasinghpur	199 sq mi (520 km^{2})	39,613
Nayagarh State	Nayagarh	588 sq mi (1,520 km^{2})	140,779
Nilgiri State	Nilagiri	278 sq mi (720 km^{2})	66,480
Pal Lahara State	Pallahara	452 sq mi (1,170 km^{2})	22,351
Patna State	Balangir		
Rairakhol State	Rairakhol		
Ranpur State	Raj-Ranpur	203 sq mi (530 km^{2})	46,075
Sonepur State	Subarnapur		
Talcher State	Talcher	399 sq mi (1,030 km^{2})	60,432
Tigiria State	Tigiria	46 sq mi (120 km^{2})	22,625

B. The list of Chota Nagpur Tributary States* (figure: 1901 Census)
Princely state	Capital	Area	Population
Kharsawan State	Kharsawan	145 sq mi (380 km^{2})	38,540
Saraikela State	Saraikela	438 sq mi (1,130 km^{2})	104,539

== See also ==
- Sambalpur State
- Banki State
- Eastern States Agency
- Chota Nagpur Tributary States
- List of zamindari estates in Madras Presidency
- Political integration of India

== Bibliography ==
- Cobden Ramsay L. E. B. (1910). Bengal Gazetteers: Feudatory States Of Orissa. Bengal Secretariat Book Depot.
