= Eastern States Union =

Coordinates: 21.2405°N 81.6138°E

- Union of princely states of the Dominion of India
- 1947–1948
- Capital: Raipur
- History
  - Independence of India: 1947
  - Failure of the union: 1948
Preceded by
Eastern States Agency
Succeeded by
Bihar
Orissa
Madhya Pradesh
- Today part of: Chhattisgarh; Odisha; Jharkhand

The Eastern States Union was a short-lived (1947–48) union of princely states in newly independent India that gathered most of the princely states of the former Orissa Tributary States and Chhattisgarh States Agency in order to fill the vacuum of power created after the departure of the British and the wrapping up of the British Raj.

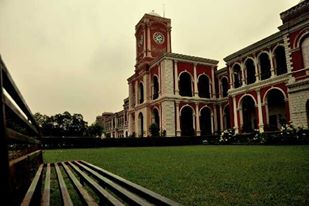
The Rajkumar College, Raipur, the place of foundation of the Eastern States Union

== Creation ==
The union was formed right after the British Parliament decided to grant independence to India and Pakistan on 15 August 1947, following which the princely states became de facto independent as well. In the transitional period the provincial Congress Party governments refused assistance to the princely states for they were hostile to the traditional princes and in fact were involved in popular agitations against them. In face of the situation of insecurity and continuous disturbances of the public order, the rulers of the states of the former Eastern States Agency formally founded the Eastern States Union in the Raj Kumar College building in Raipur. The goal was to establish a unit that would be large enough to exist as a state within the Indian Union, as well as to share the cost of maintenance of an adequate security and military force in order to restore law and order.

== Institutions ==
The Eastern States Union had a Premier, a Chief Secretary, a joint police force and a court of appeal, but it had no legislature. The union selected Raipur as its capital and quickly took the cause of building a dam on the Indravati River in Kalahandi. However, some of the larger states such as Mayurbhanj and Bastar, as well as some minor ones, opted not to join the common effort.

== Demise and successor states ==
In the end the Eastern States Union proved an administrative failure and, following intense Praja Mandal movement agitations in Hindol, Nilgiri, Dhenkanal and Talcher in December 1947, it was dissolved early in 1948.

The states that had formed the union then became part of the newly established states of Orissa, Bihar and Madhya Pradesh.

Following the demise of the Eastern States Union the states that became part of Orissa (now Odisha) were Gangpur, Bonai, Bamra, Keonjhar, Rairakhol, Sonepur, Athmallik, Pal Lahara, Talcher, Patna, Baudh, Dhenkanal, Hindol, Daspalla, Narsinghpur, Baramba, Athgarh, Tigiria, Nayagarh, Ranpur and Kalahandi.

Kharsawan and Seraikela, joined Bihar in May 1948.

The states that became part of Madhya Pradesh were Changbhakar, Koriya, Surguja, Jashpur, Udaipur, Raigarh, Sarangarh, Kawardha, Khairagarh, Nandgaon and Kanker. Since 2000 most of the areas of the former princely states in eastern Madhya Pradesh belong to the state of Chhattisgarh.
