= Praja Mandal movement (Orissa) =

Civil rights movement in the 1920s

The Praja Mandal movement was a part of the Indian independence movement from the 1920s in which people living in the princely states, who were subject to the rule of local aristocrats rather than the British Raj, campaigned against those feudatory rulers, and sometimes also the British administration, in attempts to improve their civil rights.

One response to the Praja Mandal agitations was the foundation of the Central Reserve Police Force in 1939.

== Orissa ==
When the province of Orissa was created by dividing the existing Bihar and Orissa Province in 1936, it became the first administrative region of British India to be defined on a linguistic basis. Although this satisfied some long-standing desires, it made little practical difference to many of the populace because the new province included 26 areas under independent feudal control, called garjats, where the peasantry in particular suffered the effects of misrule and autocratic powers. The remainder of the new province was controlled by the British Raj authorities.

Although the people of Orissa had little involvement in the Gandhi-inspired Salt March protests of 1930, that campaign did lead to the First All Orissa States People's Conference being held at Cuttack in the following year, with Bhubanananda Das and Sena Adhaksya Senapati Nakula Samanta Sinhar of HindolPrincelyState acting as president. It had the aim of persuading the ruling garjat chiefs to agree to more representative government but achieved nothing more than to increase their repression. A second Conference held in 1937 had more effect. Its aim was to achieve more equitable government and it led to the establishment of Praja Mandals (People's Associations) in most of the garjat states, demanding changes to the feudal system. Their demands included an end to forced labour and illegal taxes, as well as rights relating to freedom of association, publication of newspapers and property.

The first sign of trouble involving a Praja Mandal arose in the princely state of Nilgiri, where peasant demands for fairer laws resulted in the ruler adopting repressive, even brutal, measures in response. Whilst a temporary truce was eventually achieved, problems then arose also in the states of Talcher and Dhenkanal. While the ruler of the latter state took such strong measures that several people were killed, the ruler of Talcher faced an unusual protest that attracted national attention: many of his peasantry moved out of the state to settle in temporary camps in the British-governed area of Orissa. Another unusual protest occurred in Nayagarh State when its ruler attempted to introduce a monopoly on the supply of betel: the population reacted by almost entirely stopping their consumption, which led to the arrest of some of its leaders.

Discontent was voiced in other states, such as Athgarh, Baramba, Narsinghpur, Nayagarh, Ranpur and Tigiria, sometimes resulting in violence and death. Following an organised "All Orissa Garjat Day" on 29 October 1938, when people attempted to voice their concerns in unity, the troubles continued into 1939.

In early January 1939, a British Political Agent, Major Bazelgette, was killed while trying to defuse tensions in Ranpur. The news of this dampened protests elsewhere, and notably so in Nayagarh, where Bazelgette had been summoned a few days earlier to assist the beleaguered raja in calming the Praja Mandal. Whilst the rajas might resort to violence, the Indian independence movement, as exemplified by Gandhi's Congress Party, believed in non-violent protest and civil disobedience; Congress leaders such as Gandhi, Jawaharlal Nehru and Subash Chandra Bose welcomed the political awakening of the people in Orissa but simultaneously condemned the killing. The British responded to the death by sending in troops, executing the ringleaders, and deposing the raja in favour of direct control.

A 1939 report by the Orissa States Enquiry Committee, which had been formed in 1937 to investigate the garjat states, came to nothing because of the outbreak of World War II, during the period of which the British would not countenance any changes or agitation. The Praja Mandal movement came to the fore again when the war ended, spurred by the possibility of wide-ranging change should the British grant India its independence. The first cracks appeared when the ruler of Nilgiri attempted to put a wedge between the tribal and non-tribal communities of his state by fomenting attacks from one on the other. This decision, which he hoped would undermine the Praja Mandal, created a major problem in law and order that made it necessary for the Government of Orissa to intervene on instructions from the central government. The central government were particularly concerned to contain the problem, which had the potential to spread into neighbouring states, and which in part had also been engendered by the unwillingness of the newly formed Eastern States Union, comprising numerous princely states, to submit to Praja Mandal demands for democratic representation in its governance. Thus, Nilgiri came under the aegis of the provincial government from November 1947 and within weeks all but two of the other garjat states - Saraikela and Kharsawan - had agreed to merge with the main Orissa province.

Prominent figures in the Orissa Praja Mandal movement included Sarangadhar Das, Baisnab Charan Pattnaik, Pabitramohan Pradhan, Nabakrushna Choudhury and Kailas Chandra Mohanty.

== See also ==
- All India Kisan Sabha
