= Orissa Province =

Province of British India (1936–1947) and the Dominion of India (1947–1950)

Coordinates: 20.30°N 85.30°E

- Province of British Raj (1936–1947); Dominion of India (1947–1950)
- 1936–1950
- Flag

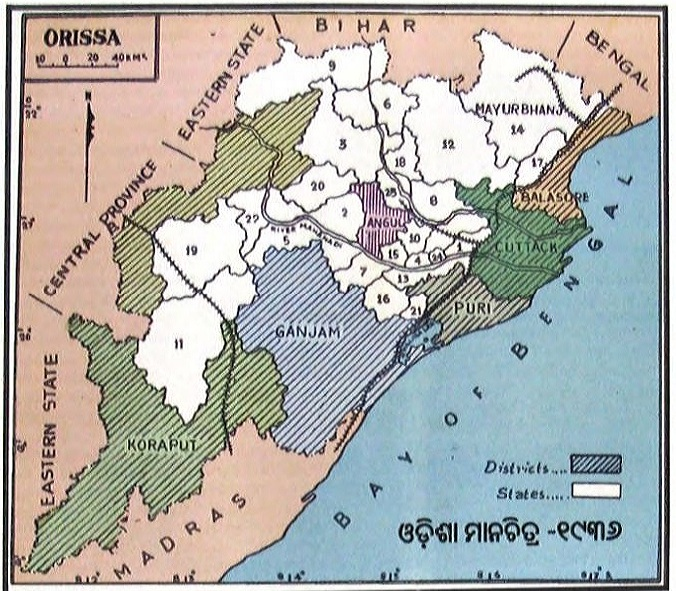
- Orissa Province with Orissa Tributary States (white)
- Capital: Cuttack (1936–1948); Bhubaneswar (1948–1950)
- Area
  - 1936: 84,680 km^{2} (32,700 sq mi)
  - 1941: 137,302 km^{2} (53,013 sq mi)
  - 1950: 155,707 km^{2} (60,119 sq mi)
- Population
  - 1936: 8,043,681
  - 1941: 13,767,988
  - 1950: 14,645,946
- History
  - Bifurcation of Bihar and Orissa Province and transfer of Odia speaking regions from Madras Presidency and Central Provinces and Berar: 1 April 1936
  - Independence of India: 15 August 1947
  - Merger of the Gadajata princely states: 1948–1949
  - Commencement of the Constitution: 26 January 1950
Preceded by
Bihar and Orissa Province
Madras Presidency
Central Provinces and Berar
Succeeded by
Odisha
- Today part of: Odisha

Orissa Province was a province of British India created in April 1936 by the partitioning of the Bihar and Orissa Province and adding parts of Madras Presidency and Central Provinces. Its territory corresponds with the present-day state of Odisha.

On 22 March 1912, both Bihar and Orissa divisions were separated from the Bengal Presidency as Bihar and Orissa Province. On 1 April 1936, Bihar and Orissa Province was split to form Bihar Province and Orissa Province. Parts of the Ganjam district and the Vizagapatam district of Madras Presidency were transferred to Orissa Province along with portions of the Vizagapatam Hill Tracts Agency and Ganjam Hill Tracts Agency and Khariar region of Central Provinces and Berar.

Odisha today still retains these exact borders, making it the only Indian state to keep its pre-independence borders.

== History ==
In 1803 Orissa was occupied by forces of the British East India Company during the Second Anglo-Maratha War, coming in 1858 under direct administration by the British government along with the company's other territories. Under the British Raj, it was a division of the Bengal Presidency with its capital in Cuttack. It had an area of 35,664 km^{2} and 5,003,121 inhabitants in 1901. The province included the Orissa Tributary States. On 1 April 1912, the province of Bihar and Orissa was detached from Bengal, and the Orissa Tributary States were placed under the authority of the governor of Bihar and Orissa. In 1936, Orissa became a separate province with five districts, comprising an area of 83,392 km^{2}.

=== Governors ===
- 1 April 1936 – 11 August 1938 Sir John Austen Hubback (1st time) (b. 1878 – d. 1968)
- 11 Aug 1938 – 8 December 1938 G. T. Boag (acting) (b. 1884 – d. 1969)
- 8 December 1938 – 1 April 1941 Sir John Austen Hubback (2nd time) (s.a.)
- 1 April 1941 – 1 April 1946 Sir William Hawthorne Lewis (b. 1888 – d. 1970)
- 1 April 1946 – 15 August 1947 Sir Chandulal Madhavlal Trivedi (b. 1893 – d. 1981)

=== Prime Ministers of Orissa ===
- 1 April 1937 – 19 July 1937 Maharaja Krushna Chandra Gajapati Narayan Deo (b. 1892 – d. 1974) Non-party (1st time)
- 19 Jul 1937 – 4 November 1939 Bishwanath Das (b. 1889 – d. 1984) INC
- 4 November 1939 – 24 November 1941 Governor's Rule
- 24 Nov 1941 – 29 June 1944 Maharaja Krushna Chandra Gajapati Narayan Deo (s.a.) Non-party (2nd time)
- 29 Jun 1944 – 23 April 1946 Governor's Rule
- 23 Apr 1946 – 15 August 1947 Harekrushna Mahatab (b. 1899 – d. 1987) INC

=== Ministries ===
The Government of India Act provided for the election of a provincial legislative assembly and a responsible government. Elections were held in 1937, and the Indian National Congress took a majority of the seats but declined to form the government. A minority provisional government was formed under Krushna Chandra Gajapati, the Maharaja of Paralakhemundi.

Minister	Portfolio
Krushna Chandra Gajapati	Home, Finance, Law and Commerce
Mandhata Gorachand Patnaik	Revenue, Education and Commerce
Maulavi Latifur Rahman	Public Works, Local Self-Government and Forests

The Congress reversed its decision and resolved to accept office in July 1937. Therefore, the Governor invited Bishwanath Das to form the government.

Minister	Portfolio
Bishwanath Das	Prime Minister, Home, Finance and Education
Nityanand Kanungo	Revenue, Local Self-Government, Public Works and Health
Bodhram Dubey	Law and Commerce

In November 1939, along with Congress ministries in other provinces, Das resigned in protest of the Governor-General's declaration of war on Germany without consulting with Indian leaders, and Orissa came under Governor's Rule till 1941 when Krushna Chandra Gajapati was again made the Premier. This government lasted till 1944.

Minister	Portfolio
Krushna Chandra Gajapati	Prime Minister, Home Affairs, Local Self-Government and Public Works
Godabarish Mishra	Finance, Home Affairs (Publicity), Development and Education
Maulavi Abdus Sobhan Khan	Law and Commerce, Revenue and Health

Another round of elections were held in 1946, yielding another Congress majority, and a government was formed under Harekrushna Mahatab.

Minister	Portfolio
Harekrushna Mahatab	Prime Minister, Home, Finance, Publicity, Planning and Reconstructions
Nabakrushna Choudhuri	Revenue, Supply and Transport
Nityanand Kanungo	Law, Local Self-Government and Development
Lingaraj Misra	Education, Forest and Health
Radhakrushna Biswasray	Public Works, Commerce and Labour

== Administration ==
The administrative geography of Orissa was established through two major historical milestones: the creation of a linguistically separate British province on 1 April 1936 under the Government of India Act 1935, the integration of 24 tributary princely states (Garhjats) between 1948 and 1949.

Year	Date	Action Type	Resulting District	Parent Territory and Specific Garhjat Inclusions
1936	1 April	Provincial Founding	Cuttack	Coastal Cuttack Division detached from the Bihar and Orissa Province
1936	1 April	Provincial Founding	Puri	Coastal Puri Division detached from the Bihar and Orissa Province
1936	1 April	Provincial Founding	Balasore	Coastal Balasore Division detached from the Bihar and Orissa Province
1936	1 April	Provincial Founding	Sambalpur	Sambalpur Division, previously transferred from the Central Provinces in 1905 and Khariar region from Central Provinces in 1936
1936	1 April	Provincial Founding	Ganjam	Northern taluks detached from the Madras Presidency
1936	1 April	Provincial Founding	Koraput	Jeypore Zamindari and hill agency tracts detached from the Vizagapatam district of the Madras Presidency
1949	1 January	Princely Integration	Mayurbhanj	Integrated as an intact, standalone district from the single large Bhanja princely state of Mayurbhanj
1949	1 November	Princely Integration	Balangir	Consolidated via the merger of Patna State and Sonepur State
1949	1 November	Princely Integration	Dhenkanal	Consolidated from the merger of six distinct Gadajata princely states: Dhenkanal, Talcher, Hindol, Athmallik, Athgarh, and Tigiria
1949	1 November	Princely Integration	Kalahandi	Established by merging Kalahandi State (Karond) with the Nuapada subdivision
1949	1 November	Princely Integration	Keonjhar	Established directly within the territorial boundaries of the former Keonjhar princely state
1949	1 November	Princely Integration	Phulbani	Formed by integrating Baudh State with the legacy British-administered Khondmals and Baliguda agency tracts
1949	1 November	Princely Integration	Sundargarh	Consolidated from the merger of two major western Garhjat princely states: Gangpur State and Bonai State

== See also ==
- Eastern States Agency
- Orissa Tributary States
