= Bhuiya =

Indigenous aboriginal community in India

Bhuiyan/Bhuiya/Bhuyan
Ghatwar

Total population
- c. 2 million (2011, census)

Regions with significant populations
- India
- Jharkhand: 848,151 (SC)
- Bihar: 716,269 (SC)
- Odisha: 306,129 (ST)
- West Bengal: 140,357 (SC)
- Assam: 83,383 (OBC; 1951 est.)
- Uttar Pradesh: 19,694 (ST & SC) (Note: In the 2011 census in Uttar Pradesh, 15,599 Bhuiya from Sonbhadra district were recorded as Scheduled Tribes, and 4,095 Bhuiya from other districts were designated as Scheduled Castes, bringing the total count of Bhuiya in the state to 19,694.)

Languages
- Odia, Hindi, Bengali, Assamese

Religion
- Folk religions, Hinduism

The Bhuiyan or Bhuiya are an indigenous community found in the Indian states of Bihar, Jharkhand, Madhya Pradesh, Odisha, Assam, Uttar Pradesh and West Bengal. They are not only geographically disparate but also have many cultural variations and subgroups. They're different from the historical landlords as Bara Bhuiyans of Bengal.

== Etymology ==
The name of the community comes from the Sanskrit word bhumi, meaning land. Most of the Bhuiya are agriculturalists and many believe that they are descended from Bhūmi, the village deity clan goddess who represents Mother Earth. They are patrilineal exogamous groups with strong family ties. The word bhuiyan is used in many different contexts and does not always refer to the tribe. Some other tribes and non-tribal landholders also use Bhuiyan as title.

== History ==
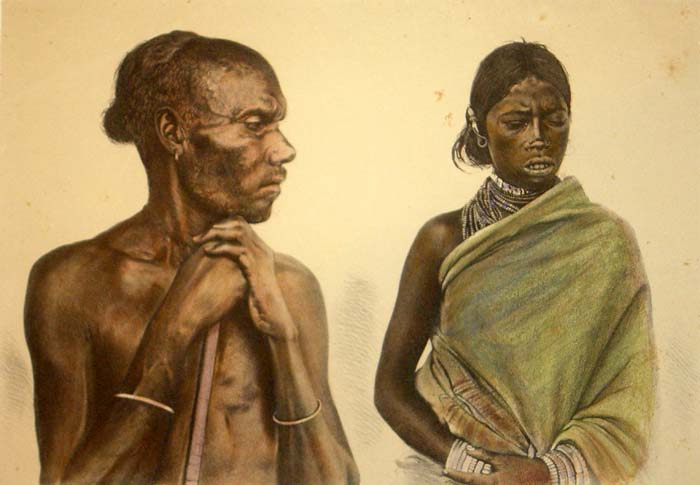
Dalton's painting of Bhuiya in c. 1872

Early history of the tribe is uncertain, but the Bhuiya were among the most populous and widespread tribes in colonial India. The Northern Tributary States of Orissa were the principal stronghold of the Bhuiyas. It is speculated that they were the oldest inhabitants of the states of Keonjhar, Bonai, Gangapur, Bamra, Santal paragana, Hazaribagh, Manbhum and Singhbhum as well as most regions of Eastern India and Lower Assam. They were also found in other plains areas of Orissa, Bengal, Bihar, Chhotanagpur, Assam, the United Provinces, the Central Provinces, Central India Agency and the Madras Presidency. They later underwent Sanskritisation to enter the Hindu paraphernalia as Hinduised groups like the Kewat, Kaibarta, or Khandayat and other related ethnic groups. In the feudatory state of Keonjhar and Bonai, the tribe was powerful. They had traditional rights to install the Raja of the state.

== Subdivisions ==
Broadly, Bhuiyans can be divided into two groups, according to their general area of residence.

=== Hill Bhuiyans ===
Known as Pawri or Pauri Bhuiyan, they generally live in the hilly and inaccessible forest areas. They have a more primitive mode of life and are more economically disadvantaged, engaging in Podu cultivation. They were, however, politically powerful and the rulers of the Keonjhar state were dependent on their support.

=== Plain Bhuiyans ===
Plain Bhuiyans live among non-tribal populations and are influenced by Hinduism and its rituals.

== Culture ==
The Bhuyans usually live in small homogeneous towns and villages. Their family structure is mostly nuclear, and a group of families with blood relations form the smallest social unit called kutumba or the lineage. Several agnatic kutumbas constitute an exogamous clan called bonso or khilli. All members of a khilli are believed to have a common ancestor, and members of many different khillis or the same khilli form a village. Intra-village marriage was forbidden. Marriages by capture are called ghichha. Other social sanctioned forms of marriage are marriage by elopement, by love and by negotiation. On death of a family member, the descendants observe a curse that caused the death for two to three days. At the end of it, the villagers are given a feast by the bereaved family.

In every Bhuyan village, there is a traditional panchayat which meets at the darbar (community center) whenever required. The village headman or pradhan presides over the panchayat. A group of villages that form a confederation is called a pidha. The panchayat at this level is called the pidha panchayat, and there is a secular headman who presides over it and is called the sardar. These councils handle their community matters. In Sambalpur, bhuyan have 12 septs which are Thakur or royal blood: Saont (viceroy), Pradhan (village headman), Naik (military leader), Kalo (priest), Dehuri (priest), Chhatriya (carrier of royal umbrella), Sahu (money lender), Majhi (headman), Behera (manager of household), Amata (councilor), and Sena (police official). Among Pauri, Bhuyan bachelors sleep in youth dormitories known as Dhangar basa (servant home) or Mandar Ghar (Drum House). The maidens of the house are deemed Dhangaria basa.

== Present circumstances ==
There are significant economic variations in the Bhuiya community, with some in areas such as Ghatwar and Tikait being landowners but many others being reliant on working the land either independently or as paid labourers. Basket-making, livestock rearing, fishing, hunting and the sale of forest produce such as firewood, honey and resin also contribute to their livelihood, although the practise of food collection has probably mostly died out. Ghatwar were king during medieval period. They rebelled against Nagvanshi king Pratap Karn. Nagvanshi suppressed Ghatwar rebellion with the help of king of Kharyagarh Baghdeo Singh. In 1857 rebellion, Tikait Umrao Singh was king of Bandhgawa in Ormanjhi. He participated in rebellion against East India Company in Ranchi.

They have exogamous lineages such as Basuki (cobra), Kachhim (tortoise), Kali (a snake), Sal (a fish), Sigari (fox), Sinjkiri etc in Bihar and Jharkhand. They have titles such as Deshmandal, Ghatowal, Paramanik, Pradhan, Bhogta, Chharidar, Mahto, Rai Thakur, Tikayat, Bhuiya, Manjhi, Nayak, Roy, Singh in Bihar and Jharkhand.

== Official classification ==
Distribution of Bhuiya community in India

In 1930s, during British Period, most of the ethnic groups of Chhotanagpur were listed as "primitive tribe" or as "Backward tribe". In Patna division, Palamu, Hazaribagh, Manbhum and Bengal, they were included in Scheduled Caste. After independence, the Government of Uttar Pradesh had classified the Bhuiya as a Scheduled Caste but by 2007, they were one of several groups that it redesignated as Scheduled Tribes. As of 2017, this tribal designation applies only for Sonbhadra district. Bhuiya are included in Scheduled Caste in Bihar and Jharkhand. They constitute 21% of total Scheduled Caste population of Jharkhand.

The 2011 Census of India for Uttar Pradesh showed the Bhuiya Scheduled Caste population as 4095.

== See also ==
- Bhuiyar
- Bhuiyan, Bengali title/surname
- Bonai State
- Athmallik State
- Rairakhol State
