= Singhbhum district =

District of British India of Bengal Presidency

Coordinates: 22°30′N 85°30′E

Singhbhum District
- District of the Bengal Presidency
- 1820–1990
- Flag

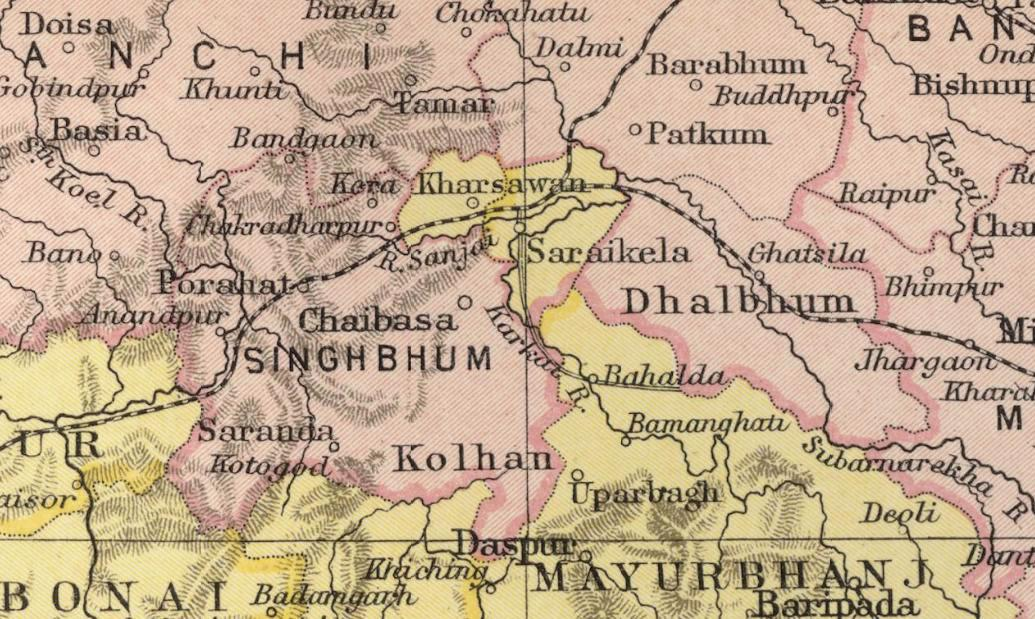
- Singhbhum district (incl. Dhalbhum) in a 1909 map of The Imperial Gazetteer of India
- Capital: Chaibasa
- Area
  - 1872: 11,660 km^{2} (4,500 sq mi)
  - 1901: 10,078 km^{2} (3,891 sq mi)
  - 1931: 10,050 km^{2} (3,880 sq mi)
  - 1961: 13,445 km^{2} (5,191 sq mi)
- Population
  - 1872: 415,023
  - 1901: 613,579
  - 1931: 929,802
  - 1961: 2,049,911
- History
  - The Raja of Porahat becomes a feudatory of the British: 1820
  - Establishment of Kolhan Government Estate by annexation of portion of greater Porahat (de jure Singhbhum): 1837
  - Merger of Dhalbhum: 1846
  - Annexation of proper Porahat estate: 1859
  - Merger of Saraikela and Kharsawan State: 1948
  - Merger of Ichagrh, Chandil, and Patamda: 1956
  - Bifurcation: 1990
Succeeded by
East Singhbhum; West Singhbhum
- Today part of: Kolhan division of Jharkhand

Singhbhum was a district of India during the British Raj, part of the Chota Nagpur Division of the Bengal Presidency. It was located in the present-day Indian state of Jharkhand. Chaibasa was the district headquarters. Located in the southern limit of the Chota Nagpur Plateau, Singhbhum included the Kolhan estate located in its southeastern part. The district has been segmented into two smaller districts, East Singhbhum and West Singhbhum.

== Etymology ==
Singhbhum is a compound of Singh and Bhum. "Singh" refers to the Singh raja of the greater Porahat state, and "Bhum" signifies the land, thereby forming the land of Singh. Manbhum, Barabhum, Dhalbhum, Bhanjbhum and other nearby areas follow similar nomenclature. However, its prominent inhabitants, the Ho tribe asserts that Singhbhum derives its name from "Singbonga", the supreme god of the Adivasis in the region, primarily venerated by the Kolarian ethnic tribes.

== History ==
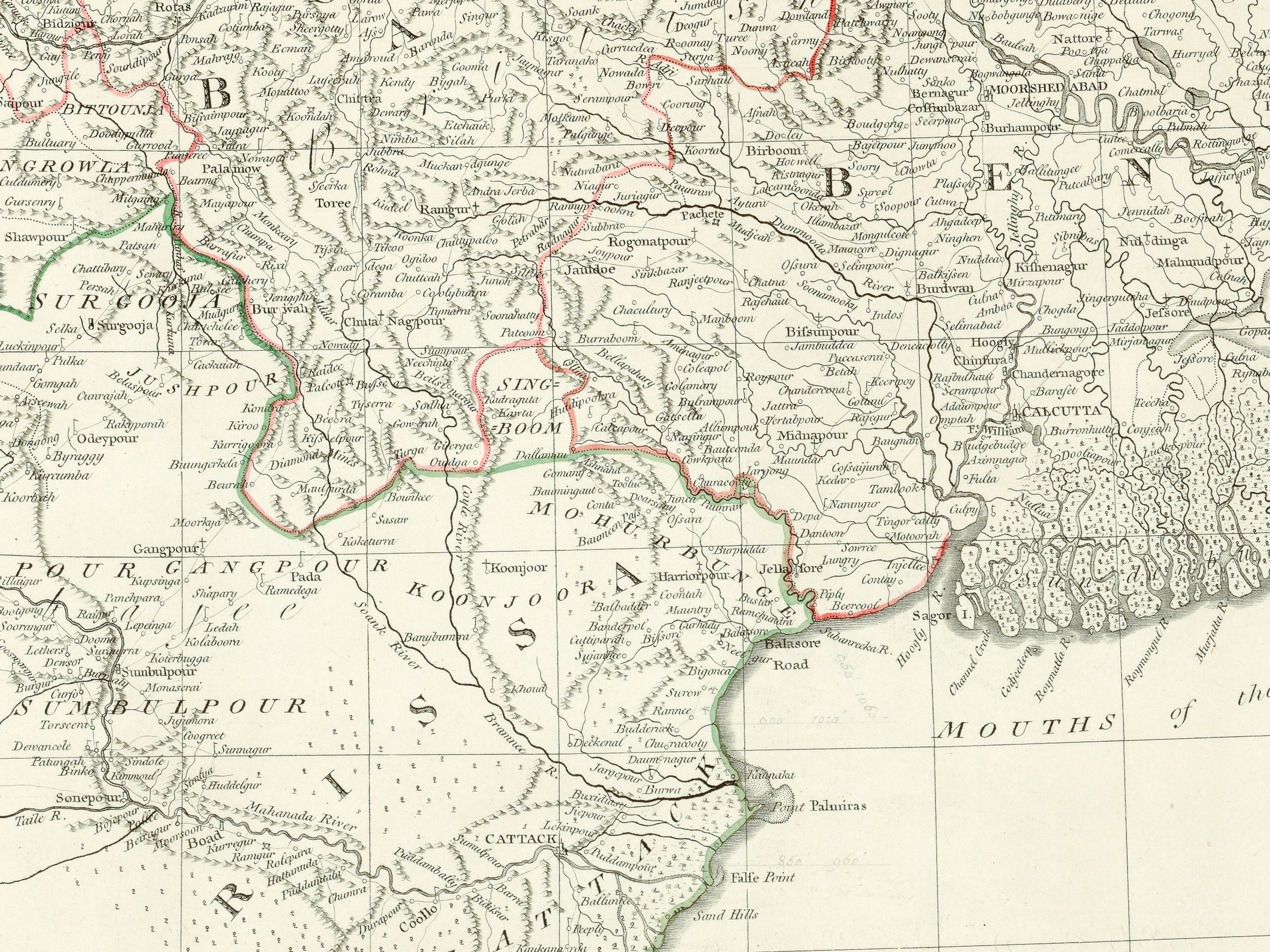
Singhbhum during Mughal rule, as depicted in the map by Rennell, 1788.

The Singhbhum area was never invaded by either the Marathas or the Mughals. The first relationships between the Raja of Singhbhum and the British were established in 1767 when he approached the Resident at Midnapore requesting protection. In 1820 the Raja became a feudatory of the British. In 1837, Captain Wilkinson established the Kolhan Government Estate after Kol uprising; comprising 26 pir, bounded by Porahat in the north, Khiching of Mayurbhanj in the south, Bonai in the west, and Seraikela in the east. Further, Dhalbhum region also incorporated into the district in 1846. The state was under the political control of the Commissioner of the Bengal Presidency until 1912, under the Bihar and Orissa Province until 1936 and then under Chhota Nagpur Division until the end of the British Raj.

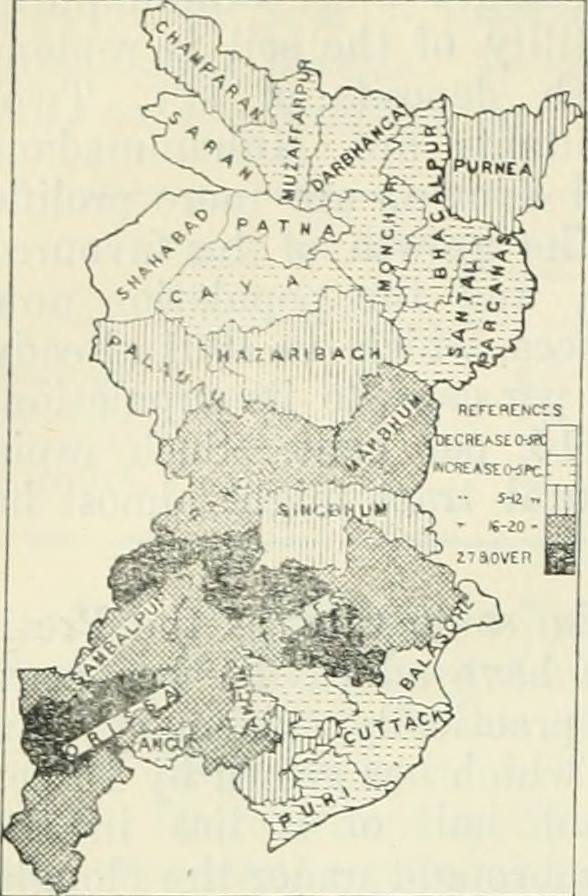
Bihar and Orissa in a 1912 map of British India

Following the independence of India Singhbhum district became part of the Indian Union as a district of Bihar. In 1990, for administrative convenience, the district was divided into two districts: East Singhbhum and West Singhbhum. In 2000, South Bihar separated from North Bihar to form the state of Jharkhand. In 1956, Ichagarh, Chandil, and Patamda are merged with East Singhbhum district by curving out of erstwhile Manbhum district of West Bengal, viz State Reorganization Act. Subsequently, in 2001, the princely state region Saraikela and Kharsawan along with Inchagarh and Chandil was bifurcated from East Singhbhum district to form Saraikela Kharsawan district of Jharkhand.

== Geography ==
It is bounded by Ranchi District in the north, with the Saraikela and Kharsawan princely states in the east, with Mayurbhanj and Keonjhar in the south as well as with Bonai and Gangpur in the southwest. Singhbhum District had an area of 10,078 square kilometres (3,891 sq mi) and a population of 613,579 in 1901.

== Demographics ==
Historical population
Year	Pop.	±%
1872	318,180	—
1881	453,775	+42.6%
1891	545,488	+20.2%
1901	909,655	+66.8%
1911	1,015,656	+11.7%
1921	1,074,254	+5.8%
1931	1,312,630	+22.2%
1941	1,565,306	+19.2%
1951	1,700,590	+8.6%
1961	2,049,911	+20.5%
1971	2,437,799	+18.9%
1981	2,861,799	+17.4%
Post 1981 census, the district bifurcated into East and West Singhbhum district, subsequently Saraikela Kharsawan district. Note: The census data exhibit discrepancies at different sources owing to changes in areas of Singhbhum. The above table primarily based on 1961 Singhbhum Gazzetters. Source: Census of India

According to the 1931 census, the total population of Singhbhum (including Dhalbhum but excluding Saraikela and Kharsawan states) was 929,802 in 3,879 square miles (10,050 km^{2}) area. The predominant communities in the region were the Ho, comprising 32.39% of the population, followed by the Santal at 11.71%, Bhumij at 5.71%, Munda at 5.48%, Gaura at 5.04%, Tanti at 4.09%, Goala at 3.79%, Hajjam at 2.68%, Kurmi at 2.42%, Bhuiyan at 1.97%, Kamar at 1.87%, Brahman at 1.71%, Kumhar at 1.49%, Rajput at 1.4%, Teli at 1.31%, Oraon at 1.09%, Kayastha at 1.04%, and others such as Karan, Bania, Khandayat, Kewat, Gadaba, Dhobi, Kharia, Dom, Mahli, Chamar, Hari, Kahar, Jolaha, Mallah, Karmali, Bathudi, Savar, Korwa, Mochi, and Birhor.

Language of Singhbhum district (1931)
1. Ho (32.8%)
2. Odia (18.5%)
3. Bengali (15.9%)
4. Santali (11.2%)
5. Hindi & Urdu (5.72%)
6. Mundari (5.85%)
7. Bhumij (3.25%)
8. Kurukh (1.09%)
9. Other (5.76%)

In terms of language, the Ho language was the most prevalent at 32.83%, followed by Odia at 18.49%, Bengali at 15.87%, Santali at 11.15%, Hindi and Urdu at 8.72%, Mundari at 5.85%, Bhumij at 3.25%, and other notable spoken languages such as Telugu, Panjabi, Tamil, Mahli, Gujurati, Nepali, Gondi, Marwari, Pashtu, and some European languages.
