= Banki State =

Coordinates: 20°23′N 85°32′E

- Princely State of British India
- 1807–1840
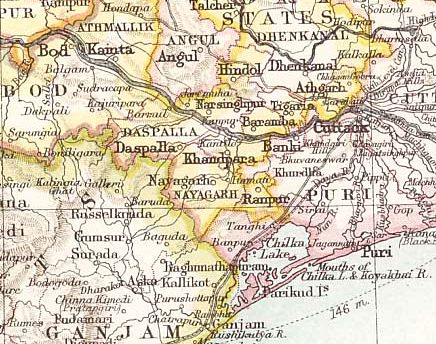
- Banki in the Imperial Gazetteer of India
- Area
  - 1881: 300 km^{2} (120 sq mi)
- Population
  - 1881: 56,900
- History
  - Established as a British protectorate: 1807
  - Annexed by the British Raj: 1840
Succeeded by
Presidencies and provinces of British India
- Today part of: Odisha, India

Banki or Bānki State was a princely state in Odisha during the British Raj. Its capital was Banki, in the western part of present day Cuttack district.

The last Raja was arrested for murder and Banki State was subsequently annexed by the British Raj. Until 1840, it paid an annual tribute of £443.

== History ==
Banki was a zamindari state situated in the western part of Cuttack District. The Mahanadi River flowed along the northern part of the state. The area was ruled by the Dhal Dynasty , whose dynasty was founded by Balabhadra Dhal. Banki was annexed by the British in 1840. The rulers of Banki bore the title of Raja

Raja who in the 17th century had established the zamindari of Dompada as a gift to his second son.

The king of Banki got married with Rajkumari Sukadei of Badamba kingdom, the daughter of king of Badamba. The king of Khurda challenged Banki's king for a war. King of Banki was killed in the war and Sukadei got widowed. She vowed to take revenge from king of khurda for her husband's death. She took help of her brother, the prince of Badamba to win the war. She defeated the king of Khurda but did not kill him as she did not want the queen of Khurda to get widowed like her. Sukadei annexed some parts of Khurda with Banki and took the title Maharani.

The river Mahanadi flowed to the north of the state, separating it from Baramba and Tigiria. It was bound in the south by Puri district and in the west by Khandpara State; a little part of the state was located north of the Mahanadi. The state included 177 villages, the most important of which were Charchika, Baideswar, Kalapathar and Subarnapur.

Banki became a British protectorate in 1807 following the defeat of the Maratha Empire in the area. In 1821 it was made part of the Feudatory States of Orissa. The population grew from 49,426 inhabitants in 1872 to 56,900 in 1881, with a density of 377 per square mile in 1901. 99.5% of the population were Hindu and the main ethnic group in the hills were the Juang people.

=== Rulers ===
The rulers of Banki State bore the title 'Raja'. In 1840 the last Raja was deposed and the state was confiscated after he was condemned by a British tribunal to life in prison for murder. After annexation Banki was put under direct control of the Bengal Presidency, being administered by the Cuttack Commissioner.

== See also ==
- Doctrine of Lapse
- Orissa Tributary States
