= Rairakhol State =

Princely state in the British Raj

Coordinates: 21.75°N 84.97°E

Rairakhol State ରେଢ଼ାଖୋଲ ରାଜ୍ୟ
- Princely State of British India
- 1825–1948
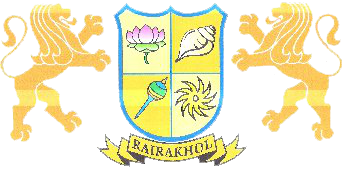
- Flag

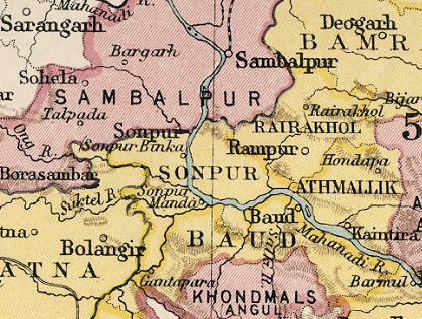
- Rairakhol State in the Imperial Gazetteer of India
- Area
  - 1901: 2,157 km^{2} (833 sq mi)
- Population
  - 1901: 26,888
- History
  - Established: 1825
  - Accession to the Union of India: 1948
Succeeded by
India

Rairakhol State (Odia: ରେଢ଼ାଖୋଲ ରାଜ୍ୟ) was a princely state during the British Raj in India. It was one of the Chota Nagpur States and had its capital at Rairakhol (Redhakhol), located in the present-day Sambalpur district in Odisha. It had an area of 2,157 square kilometres (833 sq mi) and a population of 26,888 in 1901. The average revenue was Rs. 55,000 in 1904.

Most of the state was covered by dense forest where wild elephants were roamed. Rairakhol State's inhabitants spoke mostly the Odia (Sambalpuri variety)spoken significant in the bordering region, although there were also large Kol people groups speaking Munda and Oraon language. The Chasa were the predominant caste in the state.

== History ==
Although records are obscure, according to tradition, around the 17th century a branch of the Kadamba dynasty of Bonai State was ruling in the region and the chiefs were feudatories of Bamra State until the 18th century, when the rulers of Sambalpur State freed it from its dependence.

During the 19th century, Raja Bishan Chandra Jenamuni, whose reign lasted 75 years, was recognized as Raja and in 1867 a sanad was granted by the British recognizing Rairakhol as a state in its own right. The state was under the political control of the Commissioner of the Chhattisgarh Division of the Central Provinces until 1905, coming then under the Bengal Presidency. His successor, Gaura Chandra Deo, adopted Bir Chandra Jadumani Deo Jenamuni, a scion of the Kadamba dynasty branch of Bonai as his successor. On 1 January 1948, he signed the instrument of accession to the Indian Union. The princely state then became part of Sambalpur district.

== Rulers ==
The rulers of Rairakhol State of the Kadamba dynasty branch:

- 1 Bishan Chandra Jenamani (13 March 1825 – 10 June 1900)
- 2 Gaura Chandra Deo Jenamani (10 June 1900 – 3 July 1906)
- 3 Bir Chandra Jadumani Deo Jenamani (3 July 1906 – 1 January 1948)

=== Titular ===
- 3 Bir Chandra Jadumani Deo Jenamani (1 January 1948 – 14 November 1973)
- 4 Girish Chandra Jadumani Deo Jenamani (14 November 1973 – 7 April 1975)
- 5 Hari Shankar Jadumani Deo Jenamani (7 April 1975 – 15 December 2014)
- 6 Nav Chandra Jadumani Deo Jenamani (15 December 2014 - current head of family)

== See also ==
- Eastern States Agency
- Orissa Tributary States
