= Bonaigarh =

- Town
- Location in Odisha, India Bonaigarh (India)
- Coordinates: 21.75°N 84.97°E
- Country: India
- State: Odisha
- District: Sundargarh

Government
  - Sub Collector: Sri Akshya Pillay, I.A.S
- Time zone: UTC+5:30 (IST)
- PIN: 770038
- Telephone code: 06626
- Vehicle registration: Nearest RTO; OD-14 (Rourkela); OD-28 (Deogarh)
- Official languages: Odia

Bonaigarh, also locally known as Bonai, is a subdivision of Sundergarh district of the Indian state of Odisha. It is 162 km east of the district headquarters in Sundargarh. It is a sub-divisional headquarter. The town is surrounded by the River Brahmani and the Khandadhar and Singardei Hills. Notable places of interest include a temple to the Hinduism deity Shiva (Baneswar Temple) and a royal palace.

The Bonaigarh subdivision is further divided into four tehsils or blocks. These include Bonaigarh, Koida, Lahunipara, and Gurundia.

== Demographics ==
The primary language spoken is Odia. Dialects spoken in the region include Sundargadi.

== History and geography ==
During the British Raj, Bonaigarh was the capital of Bonai State. It was one of the minor princely states of the Chota Nagpur States belonging to the Eastern States Agency.

Bonaigarh is located at 21.75°N 84.97°E.

== Most searched ==
Bonai Police Station = 9438916623 Baba Baneswar Temple Bonai = 7978357210 prist

== Transport ==
Bonaigarh is situated besides Bhubaneswar-Rourkela National Highway which goes via Talcher, Pallahara and Barkote. From Barkote it is only 55 km. Though there is no train link to Bonaigarh, frequent buses ply between Rourkela and Barkote. Once or twice a day, buses ply from Kuchinda, Keonjhar, Deogarh, Cuttack, and Bhubaneswar.

There is no railway station in Bonaigarh. However, Rourkela Railway Station is the major railway station at a distance of 65 kms.

Buses are well connected to Bonaigarh from various places. For example, Rourkela is connected by Sainath bus, Raahi Travels, Dildar Travels, Rakesh Travels, Tarini Travels and Sarala Travels. Deogarh, Barkote, Angul, Jharsuguda, Sambalpur and Sundergarh are connected by Sainath bus and Rakesh Coach (Rakesh Travels). Three private night buses namely "Krishna Jee", "A-ONE" and “Babamani” run to capital city Bhubaneswar via Dhenkanal and Cuttack.

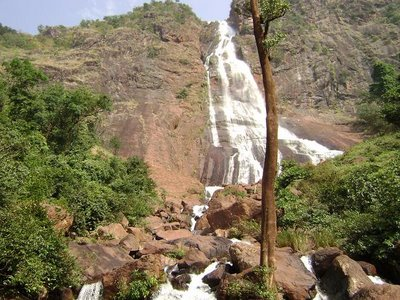
Khandadhar Waterfall

== Festivals ==
Bonaigarh is famous for an annual festival known as "Chaitra Mela", which starts during mid-April and continues up to mid-May every year. A goddess known as "Maa Basuli" is worshiped by the local folks for the relevant period along with many small temporary vending markets, circuses, rides, and Operas are found in the "Mela." Rath Yatra, Dussehra, Kantha Puja, Ramnavmi, Janmastami, Raja, Holi are the major festivals celebrated every year. During this time, Dussehra a goddess known as "Kanta Devi," is especially worshiped on the 9th day of the festival. Bonaigarh also has Muslim population who celebrate festivals such as Eid al-Fitr, Eid al-Adha & Muharram together with the people from other religion. A small Christian population is also found who normally visit Bonaigarh Catholic Church and celebrate festivals like Christmas and Good Friday. Apart from various religious practices, customs and traditions. Secularism is prevailed widely which keeps the people united in Bonai region.

== Education ==
The town is steadily growing in the field of education. It has produced many accomplished professionals, including doctors, engineers, and lawyers, who hold reputed positions in various organizations across India and abroad. The town is home to several schools and a college affiliated with Sambalpur University. However, for higher education in fields such as Medicine, Engineering, Law, Commerce, and Business Administration, residents often have to move to other cities.

== Agriculture and economy ==
There are many crops like rice, corn etc., harvested during the year. Seasonal vegetables are also available throughout the year in a cheaper rate. One villages named Talita famous for producing cauliflowers and cabbages during the winter. There are two weekly markets held on every Monday and Thursday where many local things including fruits, vegetables, groceries, utensils, pottery and plastics are traded between sellers and consumers.

It is also a business center with 5 national banks present here.

- STATE BANK OF INDIA, Bonai Branch (IFSC code - SBIN0001343)
- PUNJAB NATIONAL BANK, Bonai Branch (IFSC code - PUNB0498600)
- PUNJAB NATIONAL BANK, Banki Branch (IFSC code - PUNB0244500)
- STATE BANK OF INDIA, Gurundia Branch (IFSC code - SBIN0005900)
- AXIS BANK, Near Church Chowk, Deogaon
- CANARA BANK, Main road, Near post office square
- ICICI BANK LTD., Main road, Near church square
- Sundargarh District Central Cooperative Bank Bonaigarh Branch (IFSC code - YESB0SNGB02)
- HDFC BANK LTD, Bonai branch(IFSC Code - HDFC0005678)

== Medical facilities ==
There is one government hospital named "Bonaigarh Sub-Divisional Hospital," situated in the jail road. People from all the nearby villages and blocks depend on this hospital. However, some private clinics and dispensaries also exist to treat the people.

== Schools and colleges ==
S.No	Name	Type	Location	Distance in KM from Bus Stand	Medium	BOARD
1	Amalapara UP School	UP	Nearby Doordarshan Office	0.5	Oriya	Odisha
2	Town UP School	UP	Nearby BSNL Office	0.2	Oriya	Odisha
3 4	Gopinathpur UP School Kendrikala UP School	UP UP	Nearby Rath Chowk Kendrikala	1 2	Oriya Oriya	Odisha Odisha
4	Jakeikala UP School Jakeikala ME School	UP ME	Jakeikala Jakeikala	6 6	Oriya Oriya	Odisha Odisha
5	Gopinathpur M.E. School	ME	Nearby Bus Stand	0.2	Oriya	Odisha
6	R.D.D High School	High School	Nearby R.D.D. Multipurpose Ground(Football Field)	1	Oriya	HSC, Odisha
7	Govt. Girls High School	High School	In front of BSNL Office	0.2	Oriya	HSC, Odisha
8	Kiran Kishore High School	High School	Jakeikala	6	Oriya	HSC, Odisha
9	Gogua High School	High School	Badgogua	10	Oriya	HSC, Odisha
10	Sri Aurobindo Integral Education Research Centre	High School	Nearby Bonaigarh Children Park	0.5	Odia	HSC, Odisha
11	St. Joseph's Convent School	High School	Nearby Church Chowk, Bonaigarh	0.5 km	English	ICSE
12	Bonaigarh College, Bonaigarh	College( +2,+3 & vocational)		0.8	English, Oriya	CHSE, Odisha
13	Deogaon Primary SChool	Primary School	Bonaigarh	5	Oriya	Odisha
