= Eastern States =

Eastern States can refer to several locations:

- states located in the eastern United States, or, more narrowly, along its east coast
- Eastern states of Australia
- Eastern States Agency, a former administrative division of British India
