= Daspalla State =

Princely state of India during the British Raj

Coordinates: 20°21′N 84°51′E

Daspalla State ଦଶପଲ୍ଲା
- Princely State of British India
- 1498–1948
- Flag

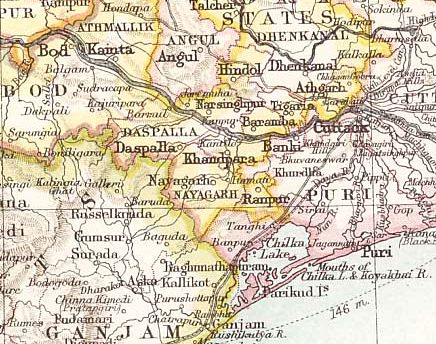
- Daspalla State in the Imperial Gazetteer of India
- Area
  - 1901: 1,471 km^{2} (568 sq mi)
- Population
  - 1901: 51,987
- History
  - Established: 1498
  - Accession to the Union of India: 1948
Succeeded by
India

Daspalla State (Odia: ଦଶପଲ୍ଲା) was one of the princely states of India during the period of the British Raj. Its capital was Kunjabangarh, located in present-day Nayagarh district, Odisha.

== History ==
The region of Daspalla used to be part of Baudh State ruled by the kings of Bhanja dynasty. Around 1498, the Raja of Baudh made his brother Naren Bhanja the chieftain of the region. Eventually due to political intrigues, he seceded from the Baudh kingdom and laid the foundation of the Daspalla state along with help from the neighbouring rulers of Khandpara State.

The state acceded to India in 1948 following independence and merged into the Nayagarh district of Odisha.

== Rulers ==
The rulers of Daspalla of the Bhanja dynasty:

- Naren Bhanja (1498 CE)
- ...
- Chakradhar Deo Bhanja (1653–1701)
- Padmanav Deo Bhanja (1701–1753)
- Trilochan Deo Bhanja (1753–1775)
- Makunda Bhank Deo Bhanja (1775–1795)
- Guri Charan Deo Bhanja (1795–1805)
- Krishna Chanda Deo Bhanja (1805–1845)
- Madhusudan Deo Bhanja (1845–1861)
- Narsimha Deo Bhanja (1861–1873)
- Chaitan Deo Bhanja (1873–19 April 1897)
- Narayan Deo Bhanja (19 April 1897 – 11 Dec 1913)
- Kishor Chandra Deo Bhanja (11 December 1913 – 1 January 1948)

=== Titular ===
- Kishor Chandra Deo Bhanja (1 January 1948 – 16 January 1960)
- Purna Chandra Deo Bhanja (16 January 1960 – 19 June 2006)
- Digvijay Deo Bhanja (19 June 2006–current)

== See also ==
- Eastern States Agency
- Political integration of India
