= Ranpur State =

Princely state in Odisha, India

- Princely State of British India
- 17th cen–1948
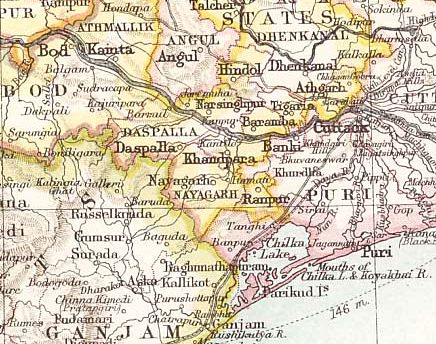
- Ranpur State in the Imperial Gazetteer of India
- Area
  - Coordinates: 20.062646°N 85.343878°E
  - 1931: 526 km^{2} (203 sq mi)
- Population
  - 1931: 47,711
- History
  - Established: 17th cen
  - Accession to the Union of India: 1948
Succeeded by
India

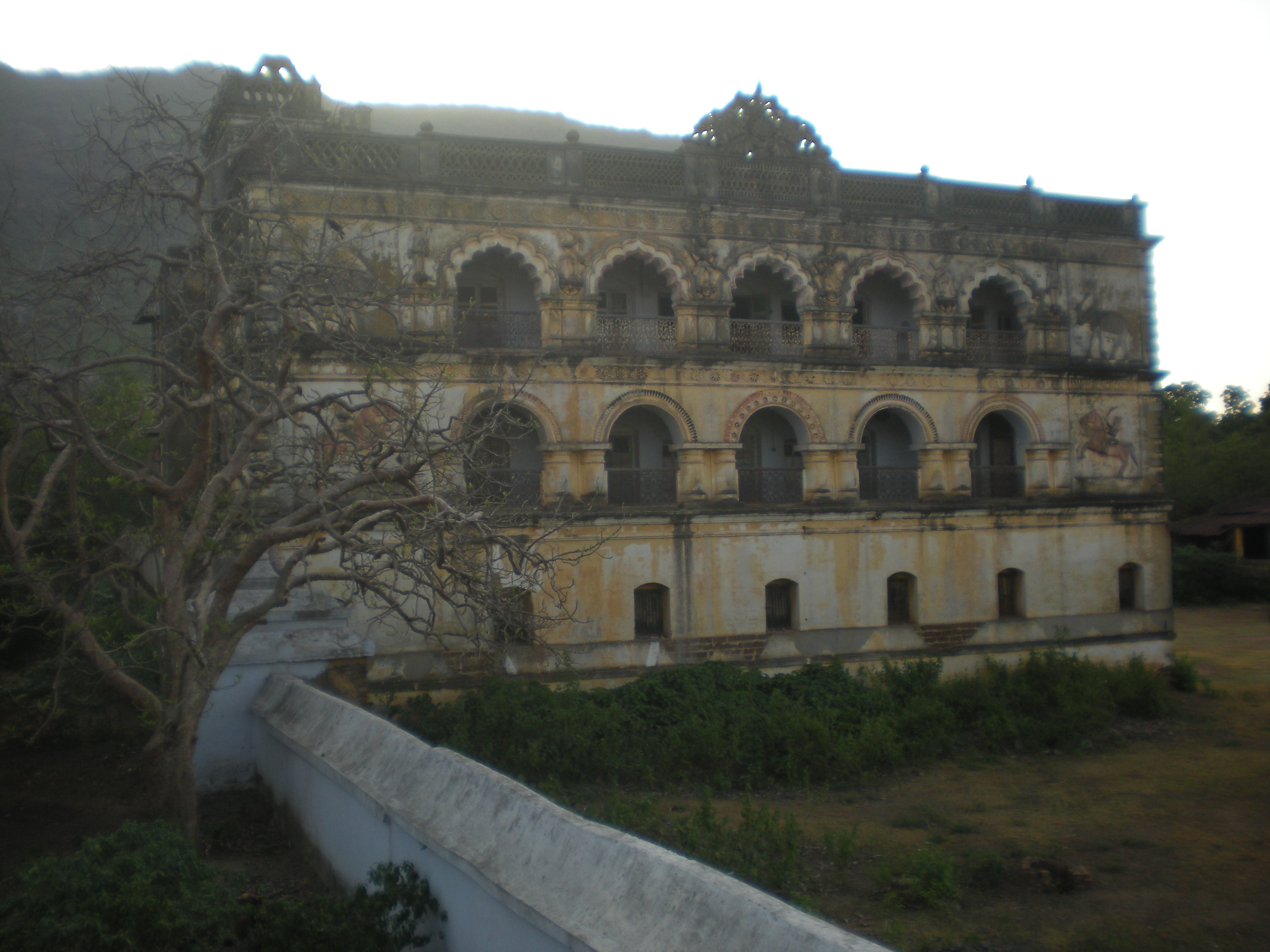
View of the Ranpur palace, former residence of the ruling family of Ranpur. Owing to lack of maintenance it is currently in a much dilapidated condition.

Ranpur State was one of the princely states of India during the period of the British Raj. It was one of the four native states located in present-day Nayagarh district, Odisha.

The state was bounded in the west by Nayagarh State and in all other directions by Puri district. It was very close to the seashore but had no coastline. Its southwestern part was thickly forested and was mostly uninhabited. The Ranpur ruling family claimed descent from the most ancient lineage of the princely rulers of the Orissa Tributary States. The capital of the state was Ranpur, a small town near Kalupara Ghat railway station where the Raja resided.

== History ==
According to legendary tradition, Ranpur State is of very ancient origin. The legendary date of its foundation is placed some time in the 18th century BC when the founder, a hunter named Basara Basuk, having defeated a giant demon named Ranasura, established his rule in the area. The name of the place is derived from the demon's name and was initially known as Ranasurapura, shortened to Ranpur in the course of time.

The Ranpur state rulers claimed to be the most ancient of all the lineages of the Orissa Tributary States, with a list of generations of rulers covering a period of 3,600 years with the Raja declaring indigenous origin in an inquiry in 1814. According to the family history, the founder of the kingdom was Biswabasab, a Sabara who hailed from the Nilagiri hills region, established his rule in the region after subduing the Bhuiyas of the neighbouring villages. Later the chiefs received the title of Narendra from the Eastern Ganga monarch Ananga Bhimadeva owing to his prowess in battle.

The state became a British protectorate in 1803 after the British defeated the Marathas in the Second Anglo-Maratha War and took over the region. The last Raja of Ranpur signed the instrument of accession to the Indian Union, on 1 January 1948, merging his state into Odisha

== Rulers ==
The rulers of Ranpur State:

- Narayan Narendra (1683–1692)
- Ramachandra Narendra (1692–1727)
- Sarangadhar Bajradhar Narendra (1727–1754)
- Narsingh Bajradhar Narendra (1754–1789)
- Brujdaban Bajradhar Narendra (1789–1821)
- Brajsundar Bajradhar Narendra (1821–1842)
- Benudar Bajradhar Narendra Mahapatra (1842–12 July 1899)
- Birbar Krishna Chandra Narendra Mahapatra (12 July 1899 – 21 June 1945)
- Brajendra Chandra Singh Deo Bajradhar Narendra Mahapatra (21 June 1945 – 1 January 1948)

=== Titular ===
- Brajendra Chandra Singh Deo Bajradhar Narendra Mahapatra (1 January 1948 – 1980)
- Pradeep Chandra Singh Deo Bajradhar Narendra Mahapatra (1980–1982)
- Dileep Chandra Singh Deo Bajradhar Narendra Mahapatra (1980–current)

== See also ==
- Eastern States Agency
- Political integration of India
