= Badamba, Odisha =

Badamba Badambagarh
- Town
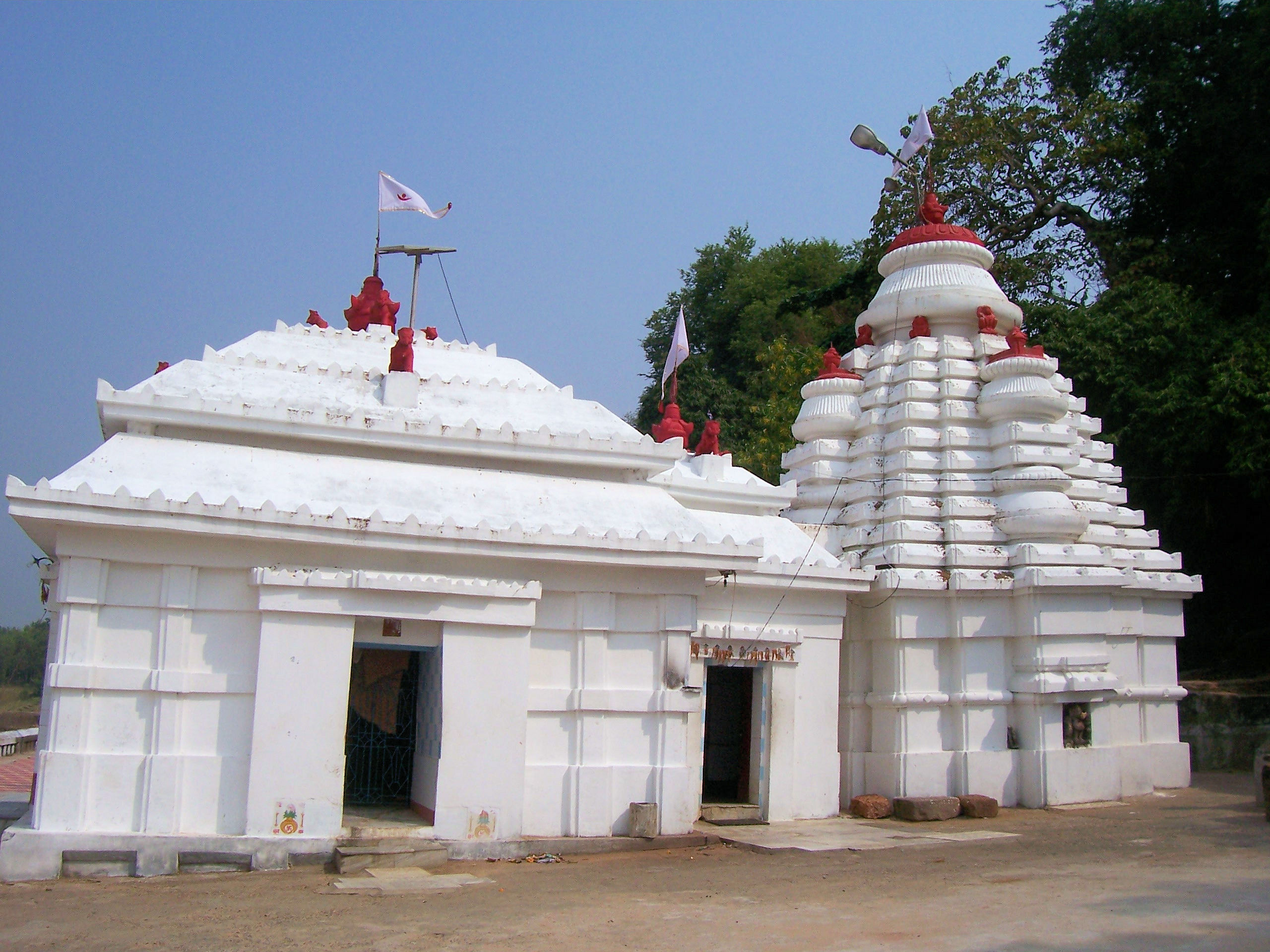
- Maa Bhattarika Temple
- Nickname: Bruhadamba Khetra
- Location in Odisha, India
- Coordinates: 20°25′15″N 85°22′41″E
- Country: India
- State: Odisha
- District: Cuttack
- Notified Area Council: Badamba
- Badambagada: 1305 CE
- Founder: King Hatakeshwar Raut

Government
  - Body: Badamba N.A.C.
  - Chairman: vacant
  - Executive officer: vacant

Population
  - Total: 149,793
  - Density: 420.91/km^{2} (1,090.2/sq mi)

Languages
  - Official: Odia, Hindi, English
- Time zone: UTC+5:30 (IST)
- PIN: 754031
- Vehicle registration: OD 05
- Ethnicity: Odia people
- Climate: Aw (Köppen)
- Avg. summer temperature: 45 °C (113 °F)
- Avg. winter temperature: 10 °C (50 °F)
- Website: odisha.gov.in

Badamba is a town and Notified Area Council in Cuttack district in the Indian state of Odisha.

There are 138 villages in 38 (Gram Panchayats) under the Badamba Block. On 24 February 2024, the Government of Odisha upgraded Badamba village to be a NAC.

Badamba is a historical place located in the middle of Mahanadi River and the mountain ranges.

== History ==
During the British Raj era, Baramba was the capital of Baramba State, one of several princely states of the Eastern States Agency.

The Bhattarika Temple, located in Sasanga village, Baramba, is believed to have been constructed between the 6th and the 16th century. The major festivals celebrated at this temple are Pana Sankranti in April, Akshaya Tritiya in May, and Dussehra in October.

== Politics ==
Badamba is part of the Baramba constituency, which includes Baramba block and Narasinghpur block.
