= Chota Nagpur Tributary States =

Minor princely states during British Raj in India

- Group of princely states of British India
- 1821–1947
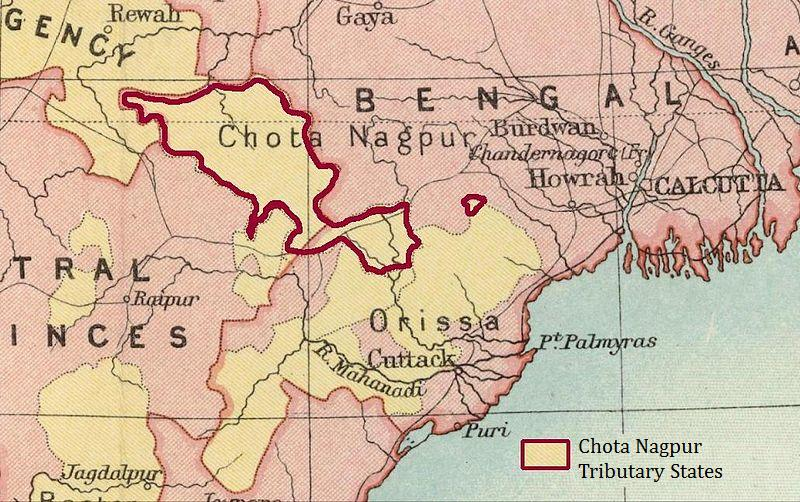
- Area
  - 1881: 41,580 km^{2} (16,050 sq mi)
- Population
  - 1881: 678,002
- History
  - Sanads issued to Chota Nagpur rulers: 1821
  - Accession to the Indian Union: 1947
Preceded by	Succeeded by
Agencies of British India	India
- Today part of: Chhattisgarh, Jharkhand and Odisha

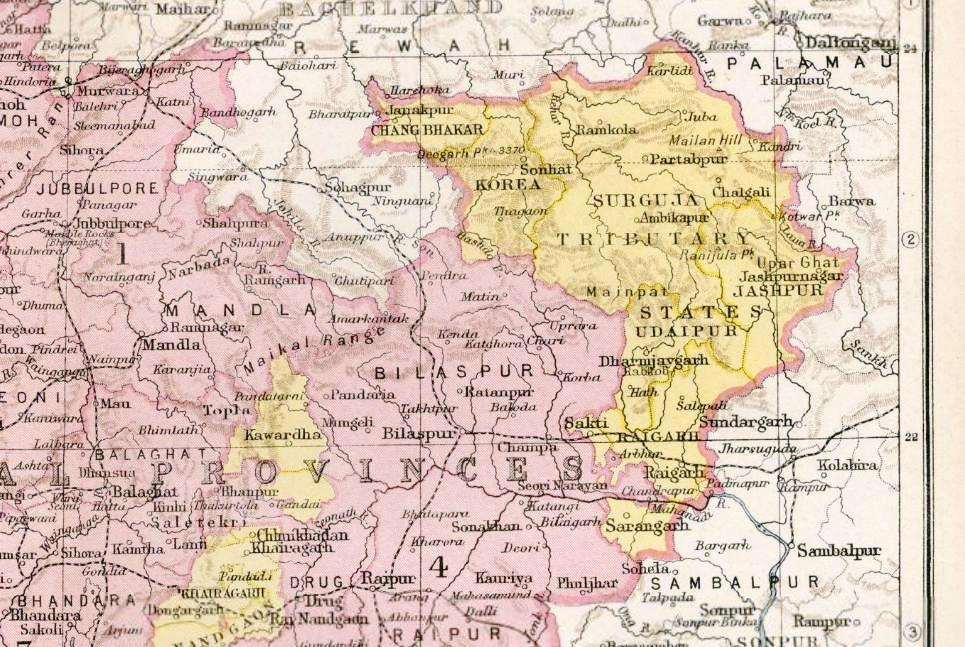
Chota Nagpur States; group under the Chhattisgarh States Agency

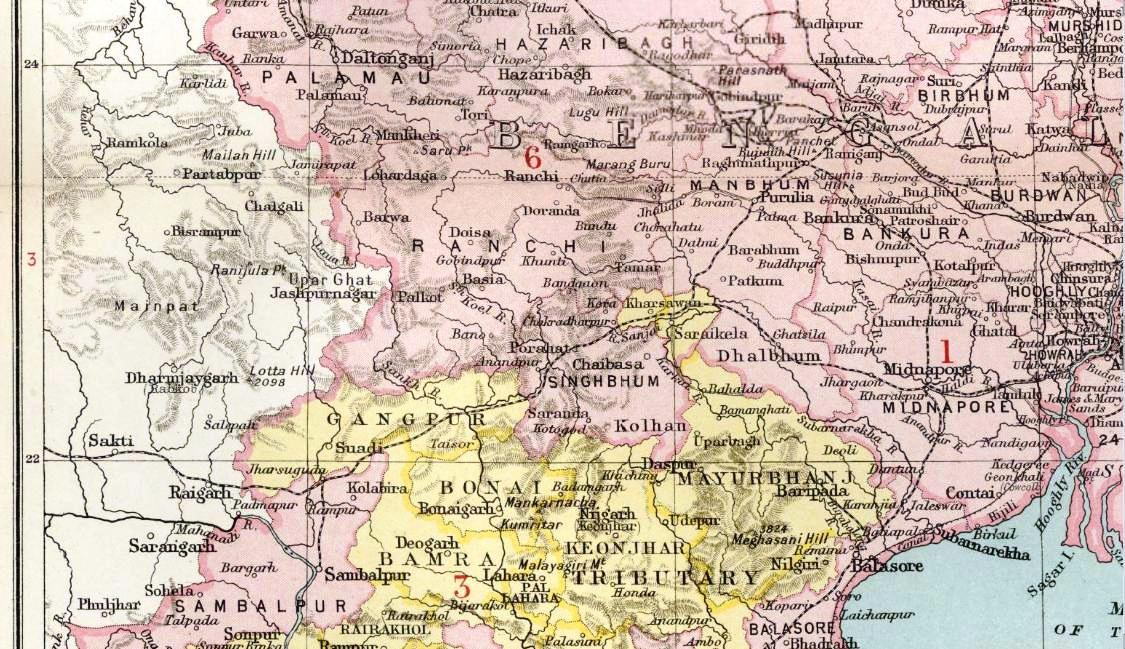
Chota Nagpur States; group under the Orissa States Agency

The Chota Nagpur Tributary States or Chota Nagpur States were a group of small, non-salute states (minor princely states) during the British Raj in India, located on the Chota Nagpur Plateau. British suzerainty over the states was exercised through the government of the Bengal Presidency.

These states were nine in number and became part of the Indian states of Madhya Pradesh, Bihar and Odisha following Indian Independence.

== History ==
In the 18th century, the states came within the sphere of influence of the Maratha Empire, but they became tributary states of British India as a result of the Anglo-Maratha Wars in the early 19th century.

In October 1905, the exercise of British influence over the predominantly Hindi-speaking states of Chang Bhakar, Jashpur, Koriya, Surguja, and Udaipur was transferred from the Bengal government to that of the Central Provinces, while the two Oriya-speaking state Gangpur and Bonai were attached to the Orissa Tributary States, leaving only Kharsawan and Saraikela answerable to the Bengal governor.

In 1936, all nine states were transferred to the Eastern States Agency, the officials of which came under the direct authority of the Governor-General of India, rather than under that of any provinces.

After Indian independence in 1947, the rulers of these minor princely states all chose to accede to the Dominion of India. Changbhakar, Jashpur, Koriya, Surguja and Udaipur later became part of Madhya Pradesh state, Gangpur and Bonai part of Orissa state, and Kharsawan and Saraikela part of Bihar state.

== Princely States ==
The following princely states were collectively called 'Chhota Nagpur Tributary States' :

- Orissa States Agency (together with the Orissa Tributary States) :
  - Bonai
  - Gangpur
  - Kharsawan
  - Saraikela
- Chhattisgarh States Agency :
  - Changbhakar
  - Jashpur
  - Koriya (Korea)
  - Surguja (Sarguja)
  - Udaipur (Dharamjaigarh) (not to be confused with the Mewar state Udaipur, in Rajasthan)

== See also ==
- Chota Nagpur Division
- Eastern States Union
- Orissa Tributary States
