= Eastern States Agency =

Agency of India from 1933 to 1947

Coordinates: 21°22′N 85°15′E

- 1933–1948
- Flag

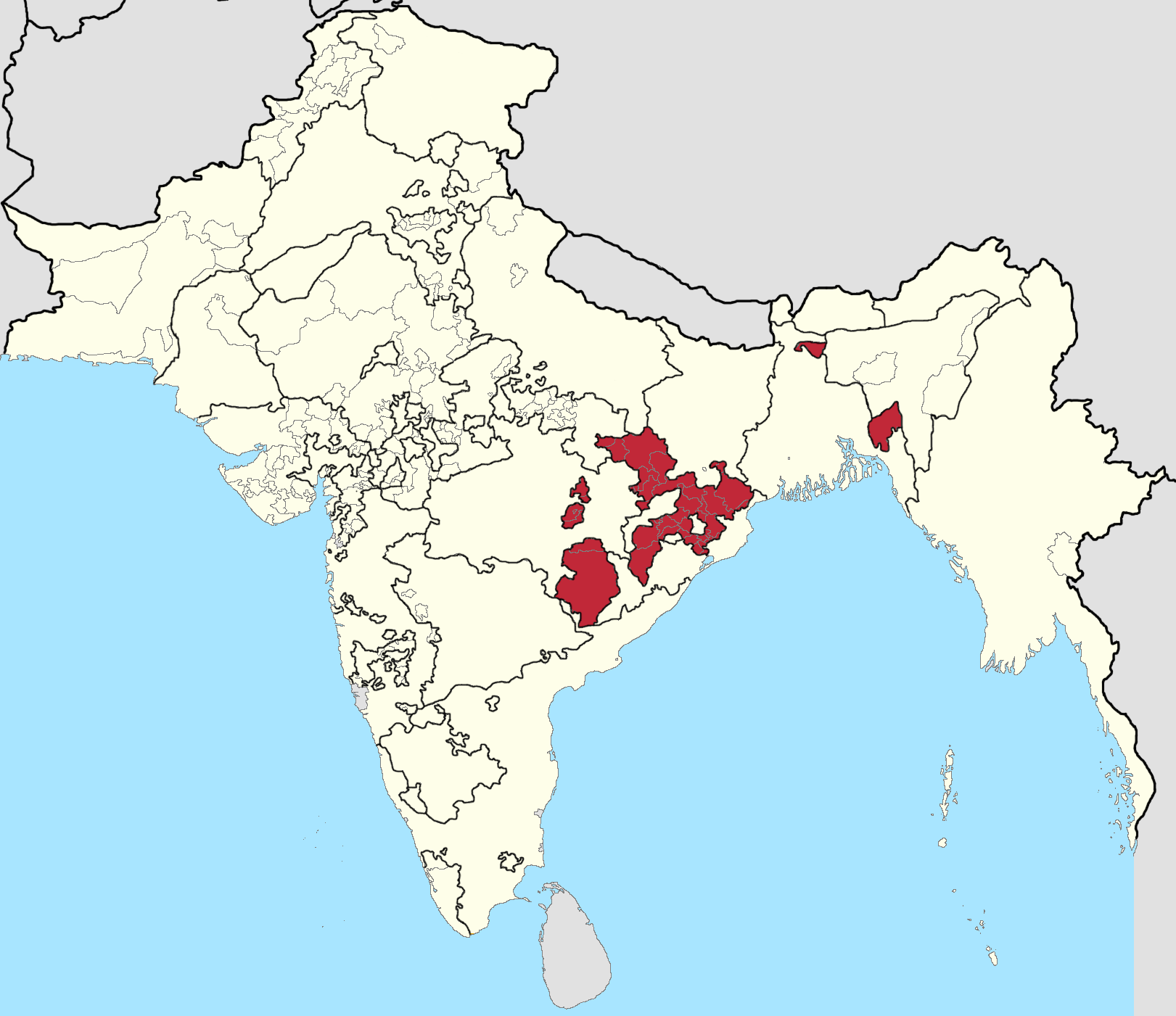
- The Eastern States Agency in the Indian Empire in 1940
- Capital: Ranchi
- States under AGG for Eastern States: Kingdom of Tripura; Cooch Behar State; Mayurbhanj State; Other 37 states
- Government: Indirect imperial rule over a group of hereditary monarchies
- Agent to the Governor-General
  - 1933 (first): E.C. Gibson, ICS
- Historical era: Interwar era • World War II
  - Merger of former Bengal, Chhattisgarh and Orissa states: 1933
  - Cooch Behar and Tripura added: 1936
  - Accession to the Indian Union: 1948

Area
- 1936: 154,570 km^{2} (59,680 sq mi)
Preceded by
Central Provinces
Bihar and Orissa
Bengal
Succeeded by
Eastern States Union

The Eastern States Agency was an agency or grouping of princely states in eastern India, during the latter years of the British Raj. It was created in 1933, by the unification of the former Chhattisgarh States Agency and the Orissa States Agency; the agencies remained intact within the grouping. In 1936, the Bengal States Agency was added.

== History ==
Since the 19th century the princely states and the tributary states of Orissa and Chhota Nagpur were not part of Bengal, but British relations with them were managed by its government through the Bengal Presidency.

The Eastern States Agency was created on 1 April 1933. This agency dealt with 42 princely states in eastern India, located in the present-day Indian states of Chhattisgarh, Jharkhand, Odisha, West Bengal and Tripura. Before the creation of the Eastern States Agency in 1933, 23 native states of the former Orissa Tributary States and Chhota Nagpur States were under the suzerainty of the British provinces of Bihar and Orissa and 16 under that of the Central Provinces.

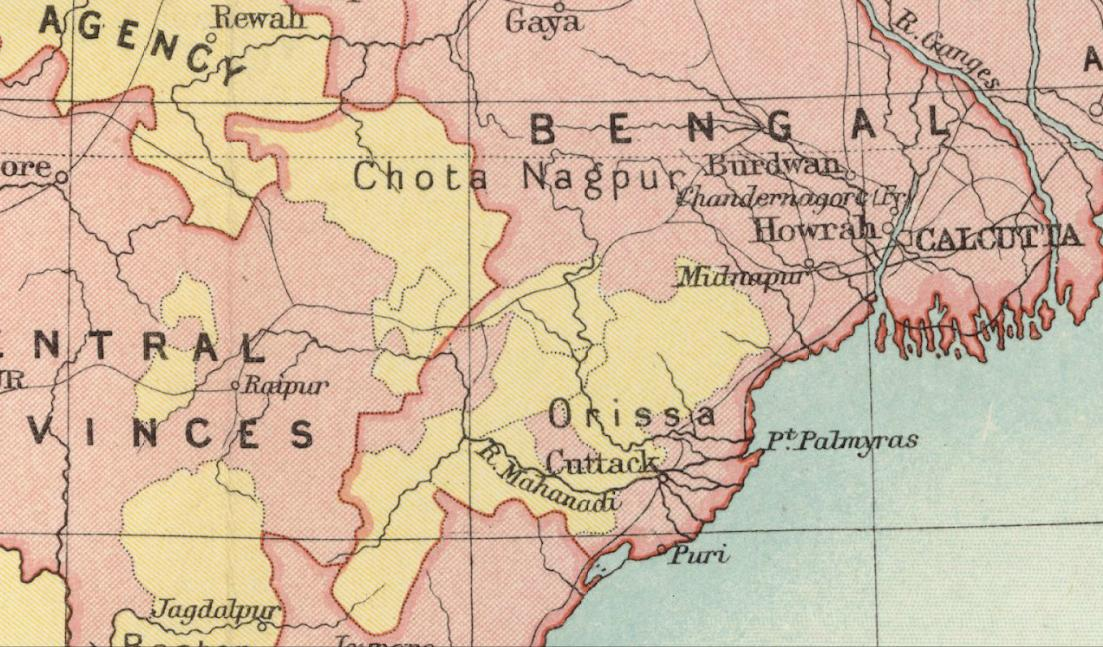
Chota Nagpur and Orissa area during the British Raj. Political Divisions. 1909 Imperial Gazetteer of India map section.

The Agent reported to the Governor General of India and two Political Agents under his supervision were posted at Sambalpur and Raipur.

Cooch Behar and Tripura were transferred from Bengal Province to the Eastern States Agency on 1 November 1936.

On 1 December 1944, the status of this agency was raised to that of a first-class residency. These states were grouped into three political agencies, under the "Resident" in Calcutta. The headquarters of the Orissa States Agency was at Sambalpur, the headquarters of the Chhattisgarh States Agency was at Raipur and the headquarters of the Bengal States Agency was at Calcutta. After the withdrawal of the British from India in 1947, the states acceded to the new Union of India and some of the states formed the Eastern States Union, an organisation that failed. Later they were integrated into the Indian states of Madhya Pradesh, Bihar, West Bengal and Orissa. The eastern portion of Madhya Pradesh and the southern portion of Bihar became the states of Chhattisgarh and Jharkhand, respectively, in November 2000.

Link to the Map of Eastern States Agency

== Princely states of the Eastern States Agency ==
=== Orissa States Agency ===
Salute states, by precedence:

- Kalahandi, title HH Maharaja, Hereditary salute of 9-guns
- Mayurbhanj, title HH Maharaja, Hereditary salute of 9-guns
- Patna, title HH Maharaja, Hereditary salute of 9-guns
- Sonepur, title HH Maharaja, Hereditary salute of 9-guns

Non-salute states, alphabetically:

- Athgarh, title Raja
- Athmallik, title Raja
- Bamra, title Raja
- Baramba, title Rawat
- Baudh, title Raja
- Bonai, title Raja
- Daspalla, title Raja
- Dhenkanal, title Raja (from 1869 Maharaja)
- Gangpur, title Raja
- Hindol, title Raja
- Keonjhar, title Raja
- Khandpara, title Raja
- Kharsawan, title Thakur (from 1907 Raja)
- Nayagarh, title Raja
- Narsinghpur, title Raja
- Nilgiri, title Raja
- Pal Lahara, title Raja
- Rairakhol, title Raja
- Ranpur, title Raja
- Saraikela (Seraikela), title Kunwar (from 1884 Raja)
- Talcher, title Raja
- Tigiria, title Raja

=== Chhattisgarh States Agency ===
Only non-salute states:

- Bastar, title Raja (from 1936 Maharaja)
- Changbhakar (Chang Bhakar), title Raja (from 1865, Bhaiya)
- Chhuikandan (Kondka), title Mahant
- Jashpur, title Raja
- Kanker, title Maharajadhiraja
- Kawardha, title Thakur
- Khairagarh, title Raja
- Koriya (Korea), title Raja
- (Raj) Nandgaon, title Manhat
- Raigarh, title Raja Bahadur
- Sakti, title Rana
- Sarangarh, title Raja
- Surguja, title Raja (from 1820 HH Maharaja Bahadur)
- Udaipur State, title Raja Bahadur

=== Bengal States Agency ===
Salute states:

- Cooch Behar, title Maharaja, Hereditary salute of 13-guns
- Tripura, title Maharaja, Hereditary salute of 13-guns

== See also ==
- Political integration of India
