= Narsinghpur State =

Princely state of India before 1948

Coordinates: 20.467°N 85.083°E

- Princely State of British India
- 17th cen–1948
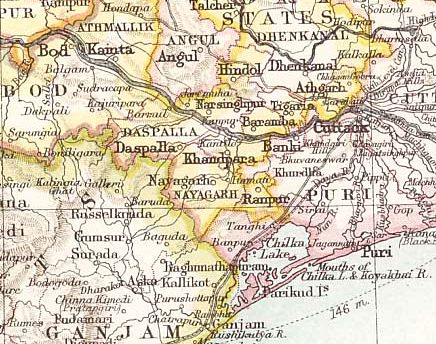
- Narsinghpur State in the Imperial Gazetteer of India
- Area
  - 1901: 515 km^{2} (199 sq mi)
- Population
  - 1901: 39,613
- History
  - Established: 17th cen
  - Accession to the Union of India: 1948
Succeeded by
India

Narsinghpur State (Odia: ନରସିଂହପୁର) was one of the princely states of India during the British Raj. The state was founded in the 17th century and had its capital in Narasinghpur town. The last ruler of Narsinghpur joined the state to the Indian Union in 1948 and Narsinghpur state was made part of the Cuttack district of Odisha.

The state was bound in the north by a forested mountain range which marked the border with Hindol State and Angul District; in the east it was bound by Baramba State and in the south and southwest by the Mahanadi River.

== History ==
According to legends, Narsinghpur was founded in the 13th century by two powerful Khond chiefs named Narsingh and Poro, the state being named after the former, who were defeated by a chieftain Dharma Singh. Historically, no records or farmans exist about Narsinghpur during both the Mughal and Maratha Empires. Eventually it was under the Puri Gajapati raja under whom it was a feudatory state, that the local chief received the title Harichandan Mahapatra.

The last ruler of Narsinghpur Princely State signed the accession to the Indian Union on 1 January 1948.

== Rulers ==
The rulers of the Narsinghpur state:

- Mandardhar Harichandan Mahapatra (1671–1701)
- Kochali Harichandan Mahapatra (1701–1723)
- Biswambar Harichandan Mahapatra (1723–1765)
- Rrishna Chandra Harichandan Mahapatra (1765–1775)
- Nimai Charan Harichandan Mahapatra (1775–1798)
- Jaganath Harichandan Mahapatra (1798–1826)
- Somanath Harichandan Mahapatra (1826–1859)
- Braja Sundar Harichandan Mahapatra (1859–4 December 1884)
- Sadhu Charan Mansingh Harichandan Mahapatra (4 December 1884 – 18 July 1912)
- Ramchandra Man Singh Harichandan Mahapatra (18 July 1912 – 5 July 1921)
- Ananta Narayan Mansingh Harichandan Mahapatra (5 July 1921 – 1 January 1948)

=== Titular ===
- Maharaj Shri Ananta Narayan Mansingh Harichandan Mahapatra (1 January 1948 – 15 November 1963)
- Maharaj Shri Trilochan Mansingh Harichandana Mahapatra (Trilochan Singh Deo) (15 November 1963 – 17 July 2007)
- Maharaj Shri Debashish Singh Deo (17 July 2007 – 2017)
- Maharaj Shri Ankitraj Singh Deo ( 2017 - Current )

== See also ==
- Eastern States Agency
- Political integration of India
