= Pratap Karn =

- Raja
- Reign: c.1451-c.1469 CE
- Successor: Chhatra Karn
- Dynasty: Nagvanshi
- Religion: Hinduism

Pratap Karn (c.1451-c.1469) was Nagvanshi king in 15th century.

According to Nag vanshavali written by Beniram Mahata, during reign of Pratap Karn, king of Sandhya, Tamar, ghatwar kings rebelled. The king of Tamar indulged in plunder and loot. He seized fort of Nagvanshi king in Khukhragarh. Pratap Karn sought help of chief Baghdeo of Khayaragarh. Khayaragarh was capital of Khayaravala dynasty. Baghdeo was made Fauzdar of Karra Pargana and he suppressed the rebellion in Tamar. The son of king of Tamar made king of Karnpura but he did not paid tax for three years. Baghdeo was sent to Karnpura to extract tax. Baghdeo defeated king of Kapardeo and killed him. He also destroyed their fort Mahudigarh. Then He declared himself king of Karnpura. For this help Pratap Karn declared Baghdeo as King of Karnpura which gives rise to Ramgarh Raj. After Pratap Karn, Chhatra Karn became king of Nagvansh.
