= Singhbhumi Odia =

Odia dialect of India

Singhabhumi Odia
- ସିଂହଭୂମି ଓଡ଼ିଆ
- Native to: Jharkhand
- Region: Kolhan region (erstwhile Singhbhum district)
- Ethnicity: Odia people
- Native speakers: (undated figure of est. 20 lakh)
- Language family: Indo-Iranian: Indo-Aryan; Eastern; Odia; Singhabhumi Odia
- Writing system: Odia script, Devnagari script

Language codes
- ISO 639-3: –
- Singhbhumi Odia speaking region.

Singhabhumi Odia is the northernmost dialect of the Odia language, spoken in the Kolhan region of Jharkhand, which includes the Seraikella-Kharsawan, West Singhbhum, and East Singhbhum district.
