= Nayagarh State =

Princely state in Odisha, India

Coordinates: 20.13°N 85.1°E

- Princely State of British India
- 1480–1948
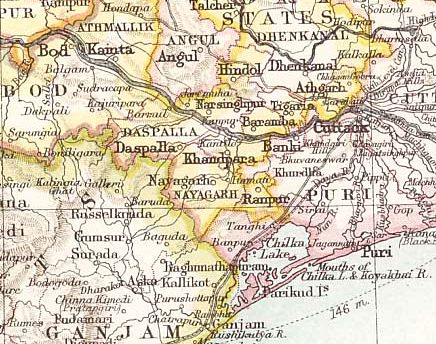
- Nayagarh State in the Imperial Gazetteer of India
- Area
  - 1931: 1,528 km^{2} (590 sq mi)
- Population
  - 1931: 142,406
  - Type: Odisha government
- History
  - Established: 1480
  - Accession to the Union of India: 1948
Succeeded by
India

Nayagarh State was one of the princely states of India during the British Raj. It was located in present-day Nayagarh district, Odisha.

The state was bounded in the north by Khandpara State and Puri District. The capital was at Nayagarh. The southern part of the state was forested and mountainous and was inhabited mainly by Khonds.

== History ==
According to traditions, Nayagarh state was alleged to have been founded by a scion from the Rewa State before 15th century, but lack of written archival historical records marks them as untenable due to the non-alignment of timelines of both Nayagarh and its collateral Khandpara state with that of the corresponding Rewa state which was founded in 1618 succeeding from Bandhavgarh kingdom, which possibly points to its legendary origins due to the historical obscurity. None of the chiefs of Nayagarh appear to have received farmans from either Mughals or Marathas until the Bhonsle Maharaja of Nagpur Raghoji I Bhonsle gifted the chiefs for his assistance during the Maratha conquest of Orissa. Although it is likely that a local chieftain by the name Baghel Singh (1480-1510 CE) who is reputed to be the founder of Nayagarh, as it was known as Baghua Nayagarh, may likely be the founder of the state and also the progenitor of the dynasty with the same name.

Under Raghunath Singh's (1565–1595) successors, Khandpara State which was initially part of Nayagarh State became a separate kingdom in 1599 with his younger son Jadunath Singh inheriting Khandpara while his elder son Harihar Singh continuing at Nayagarh.

The last ruler signed the instrument of accession to the Indian Union on 1 January 1948, merging his state into Odisha forming a part of the Nayagarh district.

== Rulers ==
The rulers of Nayagarh State bore the title of Raja. The emblem of the royal families of both Nayagarh and the neighbouring Khandpara State was the head of a tiger.

- Baghel Singh (1480–1510 CE)
- N/A
- Raghunath Singh (1565–1595)
- Harihar Singh
- N/A
- Chandrasekhar Singh Mandhata
- Purushottam Singh Mandhata
- Mrutyunjay Singh Mandhata (...–1784)
- Binayak Singh Mandhata (1784–1825)
- Braja Bandhu Singh Mandhata (1825 – 30 September 1851)
- Ladhu Kishore Singh Mandhata (30 September 1851 – 1889)
- Balbhadra Singh (1889–1890)
- Raghunath Singh Mandhata (2 Mar 1890–4 Sep 1897)
- Narayan Singh Mandhata (1897 – 7 Dec 1918)
- Krushna Chandra Singh Mandhata (7 Dec 1918 – 1 January 1948)

=== Titular ===
Krushna Chandra Singh Mandhata

Brajendra Kishore Singh Mandhata

Gajendra Chandra Singh Mandhata(Present)

== See also ==
- Eastern States Agency
- Political integration of India
