= Pal Lahara State =

Indian princely state

Coordinates: 21°27′N 85°11′E

- Princely State of British India
- 18th century–1948
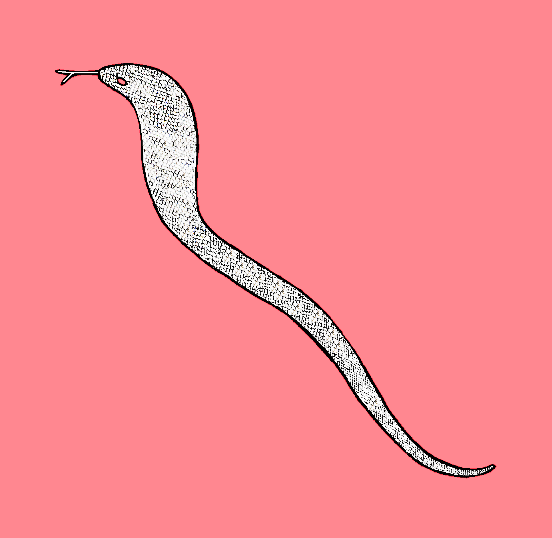
- Flag

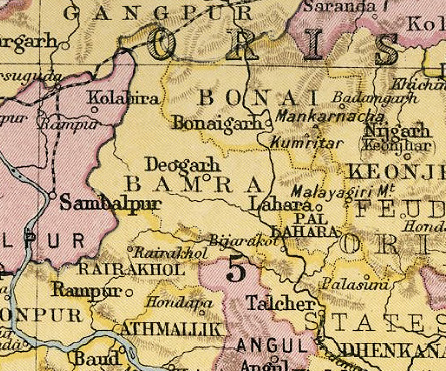
- Pal Lahara State in the Imperial Gazetteer of India
- Area
  - 1892: 1,171 km^{2} (452 sq mi)
- Population
  - 1892: 14,887
- History
  - Established: 18th century
  - Accession to the Union of India: 1948
Succeeded by
India
- Today part of: Odisha, India

Pal Lahara was a princely state in what is today India during the British Raj. It had its capital at Pal Lahara.

The state had an area of 452 square miles (1,170 km^{2}) and a population of 34,130 in 1892. In 1947 it was merged into independent India, becoming Dhenkanal District in the state of Odisha in 1948.

== History ==
According to traditions, the state is alleged to have been founded by Santosh Pal who claimed numerous legendary origins, came across a dispute between various aboriginal tribes in the region and was eventually selected by the Sabara tribe to be the ruler of the region. But most historical records from the Gajapati, Maratha or early British colonial era don't show any records pertaining to the dynasty and no firmans recording it exist from the Mughal or Maratha period, thus suggesting the traditional accounts of family traditions hence acquired distinct mythical and legendary characteristics. Most research into the origins of the dynasty points that the founders of the Pallhara State belonged to the head of the Sabara clans of the region which was later acquired mythical characteristics as evident from the traditional accounts of the tribal clans and the close relationship of the Sabara chiefs with the rituals of the dynasty. The state emblem is the cobra, which also figures in the founding myths of dynasty and regional tribal traditions.

Existing records start from 1778 CE with the death of chief Muni Pal which points to the ensuing succession politics and the feud with Keonjhar State under whose it was a feudatory. In 1867, chief Chakradhar Pal was recognized as Raja by the British for his efforts in suppressing the local tribal rebellions and a sanad was granted by the British recognizing Pal Lahara as a state in its own right.

On 1 January 1948, the last ruler signed the instrument of accession to the Indian Union following independence and the region currently forms a part of Angul district.

== Rulers ==
The rulers of this State were formerly styled zamindars and had the hereditary title of Raja from 1874.

The rulers of the Pal Lahara state:

- Muni Pal (? - 1778 CE)
- Anna Purna (f) (1778 - 1815)
- Nanda Pal (1815 - 1825)
- Badyanath Pal (1825 - 1859)
- Chakradhar Pal (1859 - 30 August 1888)
- Dwiti Krishna Pal (30 August 1888 – 30 July 1912)
- Sarat Chandra Muni Pal (18 April 1913 – 1 January 1948)

=== Titular ===
- Sarat Chandra Muni Pal (1 Jan 1948-2 Feb 1965)
- Sachidananda Pal (2 Feb 1965-??)
- Ram Chandra Muni Pal (19??-Date)
