= Saraikela State =

Princely state of British India in modern-day Jharkhand

Coordinates: 22°41′52″N 85°58′28″E

Saraikella State ଷଢ଼େଇଖଳା ରାଜ୍ୟ
- Princely State of British India
- Flag

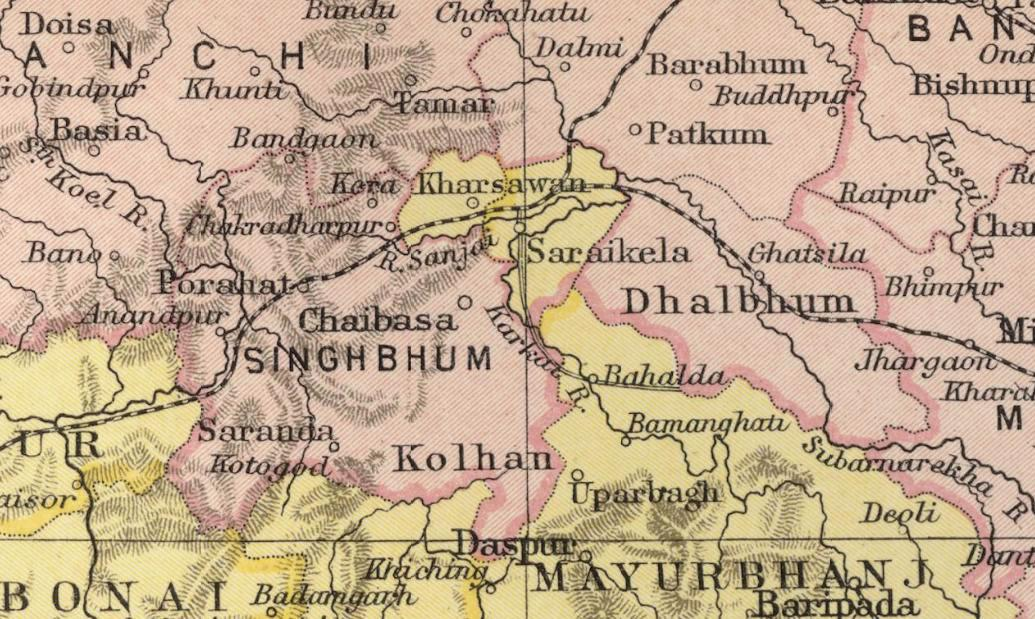
- Saraikela State in a 1909; Imperial Gazetteer of India map
- Capital: Saraikela
- Area
  - 1892: 1,163 km^{2} (449 sq mi)
  - 1901: 1,162 km^{2} (449 sq mi)
  - 1941: 1,210 km^{2} (470 sq mi)
- Population
  - 1872: 66,347
  - 1891: 93,839
  - 1901: 104,539
  - 1941: 154,844
- History
  - Established: 1620
  - Independence of India: 15 August 1947
  - Accession to the Union of India: 13 December 1948
  - Merged with Bihar: 1 August 1949
Succeeded by
India
- Today part of: Saraikela Kharsawan district, Jharkhand

Saraikela State also spelt Seraikela, Saraikella or Seraikella, was a odia princely state in India during the British Raj, in what is now the Seraikela-Kharsawan district of the Jharkhand state. Its capital was at Saraikela.

The state had an area of 1163 km^{2} which yielded an average revenue of Rs. 92,000 in 1901, and was one of the nine Chota Nagpur States, a group of small, non-salute states (minor princely states), under the authority of the governor of Bengal Presidency. The last ruler of the state, Raja Aditya Pratap Singh Deo, signed the merger agreement acceding to the Indian Union on 18 May 1948.

== History ==
The state was founded in 1620 by Raja Bikram Singh, from Rathore clan of Rajputs. The state came under the influence of the Maratha rulers of Nagpur in the 18th century, and became a princely state of British India in 1803, at the conclusion of the Second Anglo-Maratha War at Deogaon of Orissa. After the war, the East India Company included the Saraikela princely state under the governance of the Chhota Nagpur Commissioner.

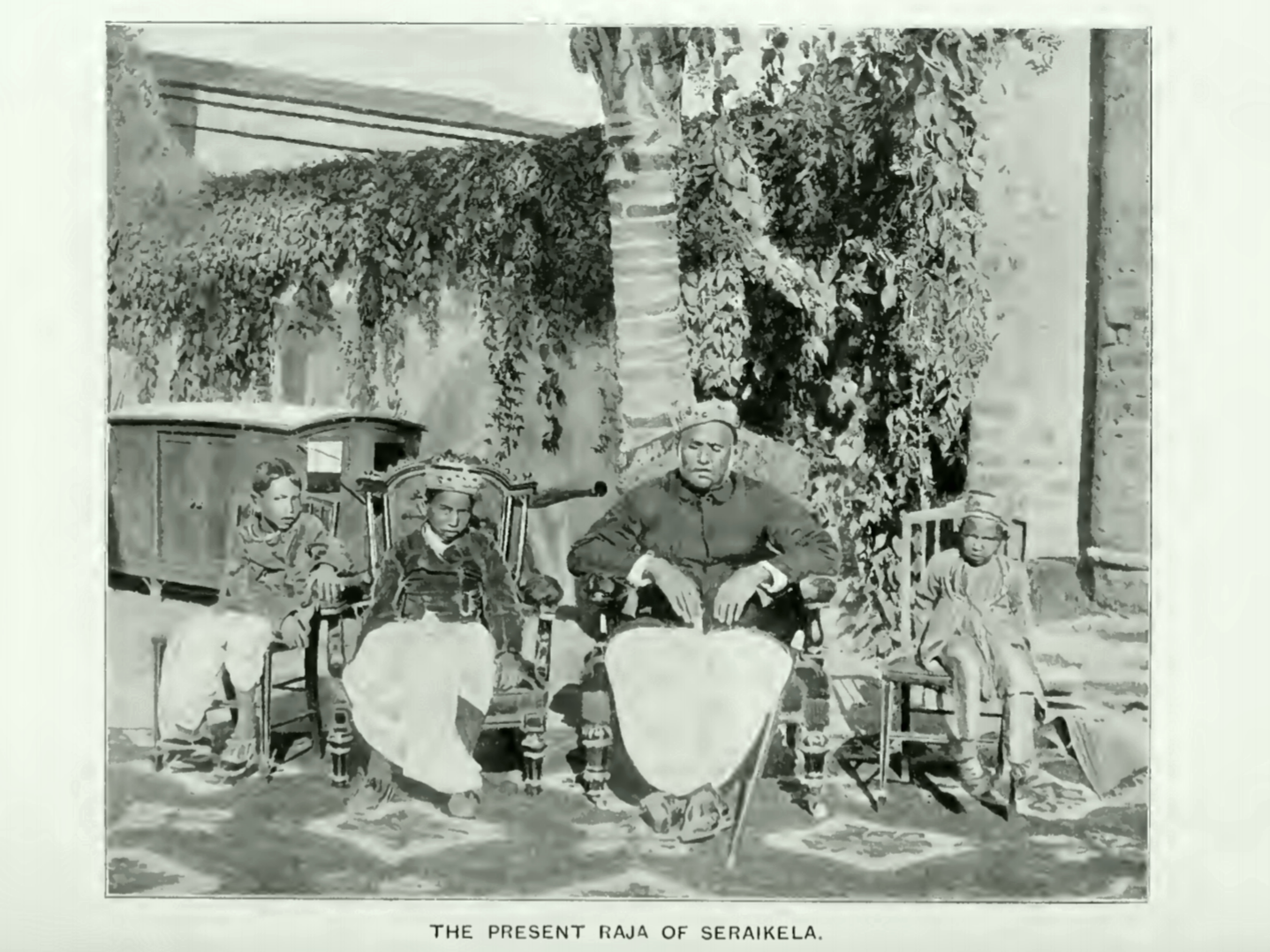
Raja of Saraikela state (1903).

In 1912 Saraikela came under the authority of the province of Bihar and Orissa, which was newly created from the eastern districts of Bengal. In 1936 the state was placed under the authority of the Orissa Province.

=== Post independence ===
Saraikela, along with 24 other princely states of the Eastern States Agency, acceded to the Government of India on 1 January 1948, with a will to merge the princely state with Orissa province of the Indian Republic.

As a result, both Saraikela and Kharsawan princely states were merged with Orissa in 1948. On 1 January 1948 itself, the tribals of these two princely states, who were in a majority, revolted against the merger with Orissa. This was supported by Patayet Sahib Maharajkumar Bhoopendra Narayan Singh Deo, third son of Raja Aditya, as a result of which he was imprisoned to ensure the popular movement died down. The central government appointed a commission under Mr. Baudkar to look into the matter. On the basis of the Baudkar commission report, Saraikela and Kharsawan princely states were merged with Bihar on 18 May 1948.

These two princely states became part of Jharkhand when the state was carved out of Bihar on 15 November 2000. From 18 May 1948 onward, many non-tribal Oriyas of the districts of Saraikela Kharsawan, East Singhbhum, and West Singhbhum have migrated and settled permanently in Odisha.

== Demographics ==
Historical population
Year	Pop.	±%
1891	93,839	—
1901	104,539	+11.4%
1911	109,794	+5.0%
1921	115,192	+4.9%
1931	143,525	+24.6%
1941	154,844	+7.9%
Source: Census of British India

=== Communities ===
According to the 1941 Census, the Seraikela State covered an area of 466 square miles (1,210 km^{2}) and had a population of 154,844. The state was primarily inhabited by tribal communities, including Santal (20.78%), Ho (15.18%), Bhumij (7.11%), Munda (1.43%), Oraon (0.57%), Mahli (0.5%), and Gond (0.02%). The overall literacy rate stood at 6.39%, with 8,948 literate males and 946 literate females.

Religious demographics of Seraikela State (1941)
1. Tribal beliefs (52.0%)
2. Hinduism (46.8%)
3. Islam (1.21%)
4. Sikhism & Jainism (0.04%)
5. Christianity (0.02%)
Total population: 154,844

==== Language ====
Linguistic breakdown of Seraikela State (1931 Census)
1. Bengali (27.5%)
2. Odia (23.2%)
3. Ho (19.3%)
4. Santali (17.1%)
5. Bhumij (3.99%)
6. Hindustani (3.77%)
7. Mundari (3.36%)
8. Oraon (0.55%)
9. Others (1.11%)
Excludes the neighboring Kharsawan State dataset. Total population: 143,525.

Bengali formed the largest single language group at 27.50%, serving as a prominent language across the eastern and rural boundaries of the princely state. This was followed by Odia at 23.23%, which held a significant historical presence and served as an administrative anchor within the state territory.

Austroasiatic languages also made up a robust portion of the population, dominated by Ho at 19.34% and Santali at 17.15%, aligning with the large tribal population within the state's boundaries. The remainder of the population spoke Bhumij (3.99%), Hindustani (3.77%), Mundari (3.36%), Oraon (0.55%), and other unclassified tribal or regional tongues (1.11%).

== Rulers ==
The rulers were Rajputs of the Rathore clan and bore the title of 'Kunwar' until 1884. The rulers are descendants of the Porahat royal family.

=== Kunwars ===
- 1620 – 1677 Bikram Singh I
- 1677 – 1728 Nru Singh
- 1728 – 1743 Satrughan Singh
- 1743 – 1818 Abhiram Singh
- 1818 – 1823 Bikram Singh II
- 1823 – 1837 Ajamber Singh
- 1837 – 1883 Chakradhar Singh
- 25 Nov 1883 – Nov 1884 Udit Narayan Singh (b. 1849 – d. 1931)

=== Rajas ===
- Nov 1884 – 9 December 1931 Udit Narayan Singh (s.a.)
- 9 December 1931 – 15 August 1947 Aditya Pratap Singh (b. 1887 – d. 1969)

=== Titular Rajas ===
- Tribhuvan Singhdeo 1969 – 1993 ( b. 1930 – d. 1993)
- Vikram Singhdeo 1993 – Present

== See also ==
- Political integration of India
- Kharsawan State

== Bibliography ==
- O'Malley, L. S. S. (1910). Bengal district gazetteers : Singhbhum, Saraikela and Kharsawan. Calcutta: Bengal Secretariat Book Depot. OCLC 220796364. Archived from the original on 18 January 2017.
- Singh Deo, Tikayet Nrupendra Narayan (c. 1957). Singhbum, Seraikella & Kharswan through the ages.
- Paty, Chittaranjan Kumar (2002). History Of Seraikella Kharsawan States (1620–1956). Classical publishing company. ISBN 9788170543596.
