= Baudh State =

Coordinates: 20.84°N 84.32°E

- Princely State of British India
- 14th century–1948
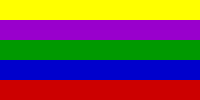
- Flag

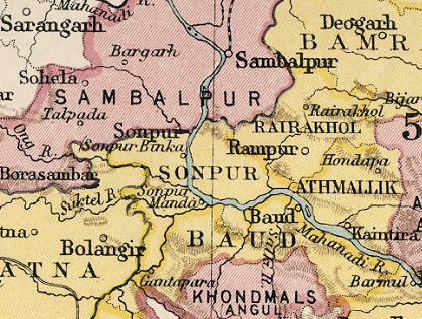
- Baudh State in the Imperial Gazetteer of India
- Area
  - 1921: 3,274 km^{2} (1,264 sq mi)
- Population
  - 1921: 130,103
- History
  - Established: 14th century
  - Accession to the Union of India: 1948
Succeeded by
India

Baudh State, also known as Boudh State, was one of the princely states of India during the British Raj. It was recognized as a state in 1874 and had its capital in Boudh town. Its last ruler signed the document of accession to the Indian Union on 1 January 1948.

== History ==
According to traditions, after the fall of the Somavamshi dynasty to Eastern Gangas, local chieftains were installed in the region as feudatories. A childless Brahmin chieftain adopted the nephew of the neighbouring Raja of Keonjhar who belonged to the Bhanj dynasty. This prince styled himself Ananga Deva and founded the state in the 14th century.

== See also ==
- Eastern States Agency
- Political integration of India
