= Athmallik State =

Princely State of British India

Coordinates: 20°43′11″N 84°31′48″E

State of Athmallik ଆଠମଲ୍ଲିକ ରାଜ୍ୟ
- Princely State of British India
- 16th century–1948
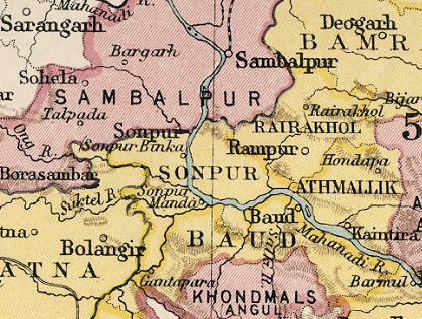
- Athmallik State in the Imperial Gazetteer of India
- Capital: Kaintragarh
- Demonym: Athmallikia
- Area
- 1,890 km^{2} (730 sq mi)
- Population
- 64,276
- Government
  - Type: Monarchy
  - Motto: salus populi suprema lex esto
- Raja
  - 11th century: Pratap Deo
  - 1785-1802: Lakshmidhar Deo
  - 1852-1879: Jogindra Deo
  - 1876-1901: Maharaja Mahendra Deo
  - 1901-1918: Bibhubendra Deo
  - 1918-1948: Kishore Chandra Deo
- Historical era: 11th century
  - Established: 16th century
  - Accession to the Union of India: 1948
Succeeded by
India
- Today part of: Angul, Odisha

Athmallik State (Odia: ଆଠମଲ୍ଲିକ) was a princely state of India from its formation in 1874, through the time of the British Raj, to its merging with Orissa State in 1948. During the British Raj, the princely state of Athmallik covered an area of 1,890 km^{2} with a population of 64,276.

== Geography ==
The princely state of Athmallik was located in present day Odisha in east central India. Within Odisha, it was located in the present day Angul district at its southwest border on the Mahanadi river. Its capital was Kaintaragarh, also called Athmallik.

Athmallik was heavily covered in jungle. Hills run from north to south along the Mahanadi river. In the south, the Mahanadi river plain provides a belt of arable land to a width of approximately 13 km. Athmallik included part of the Talcher Coalfield.

In 1872, British surveyors recorded their finding of iron ore and smelting, a catechu trade and hot springs at Athmallik. However, the population was sparse. There was only one village that had more than 100 houses. The crops consisted of coarse rice, poor quality grains and oil seeds.

In the early 1900s, the Raja conducted an elephant capturing program which caught between 10 and 15 animals each three years.

== History ==
=== Athmallik prior to 1874 ===
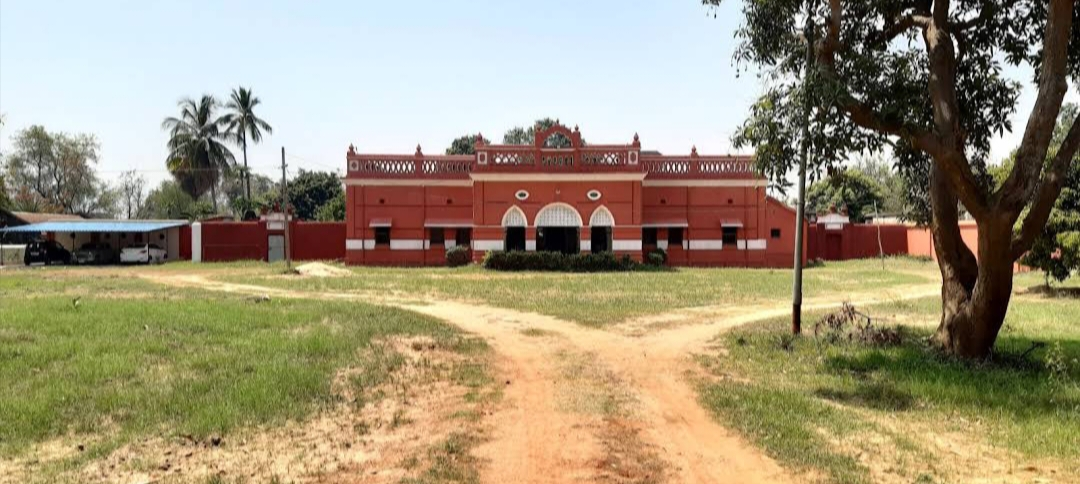
Athmallik royal palace

In 1910, L.E.B. Cobden-Ramsay wrote about the history of Athmallik in the Bengal District Gazetteer. He says that prior to its treaty with the British, official records of the estate of Athmallik are scant.

Local lore suggests the ruler of Jaipur had seven sons. The sons and their families travelled to Puri district on a pilgrimage. An altercation with the ruler of Puri lead to the execution of two of the brothers. The living five fled to the hills where there was a high plain or garh. One of the sons, Pratap Deva, captured a fortified residence. There, he found a metal vessel (handa) and named the Handapa. In later times, the ruler of Handapa divided the estate into eight parts. Athmallik with its own ruler was one of these parts.

Cobden-Ramsay refers to a mention of Athmallik in 1804 as part of the Baudh estate. After 1834, it was known as part of the South-West Frontier Agency, a British administrative area and then in 1837 Athmallik was transferred to the Orissa administrative district.

=== Athmallik after 1874 ===
Athmallik's treaty arrangement was not part of the original 11 associated with the Orissa state but was one of the eventual 26. Hence, Athmillik was a Orissa Tributary Mahal.

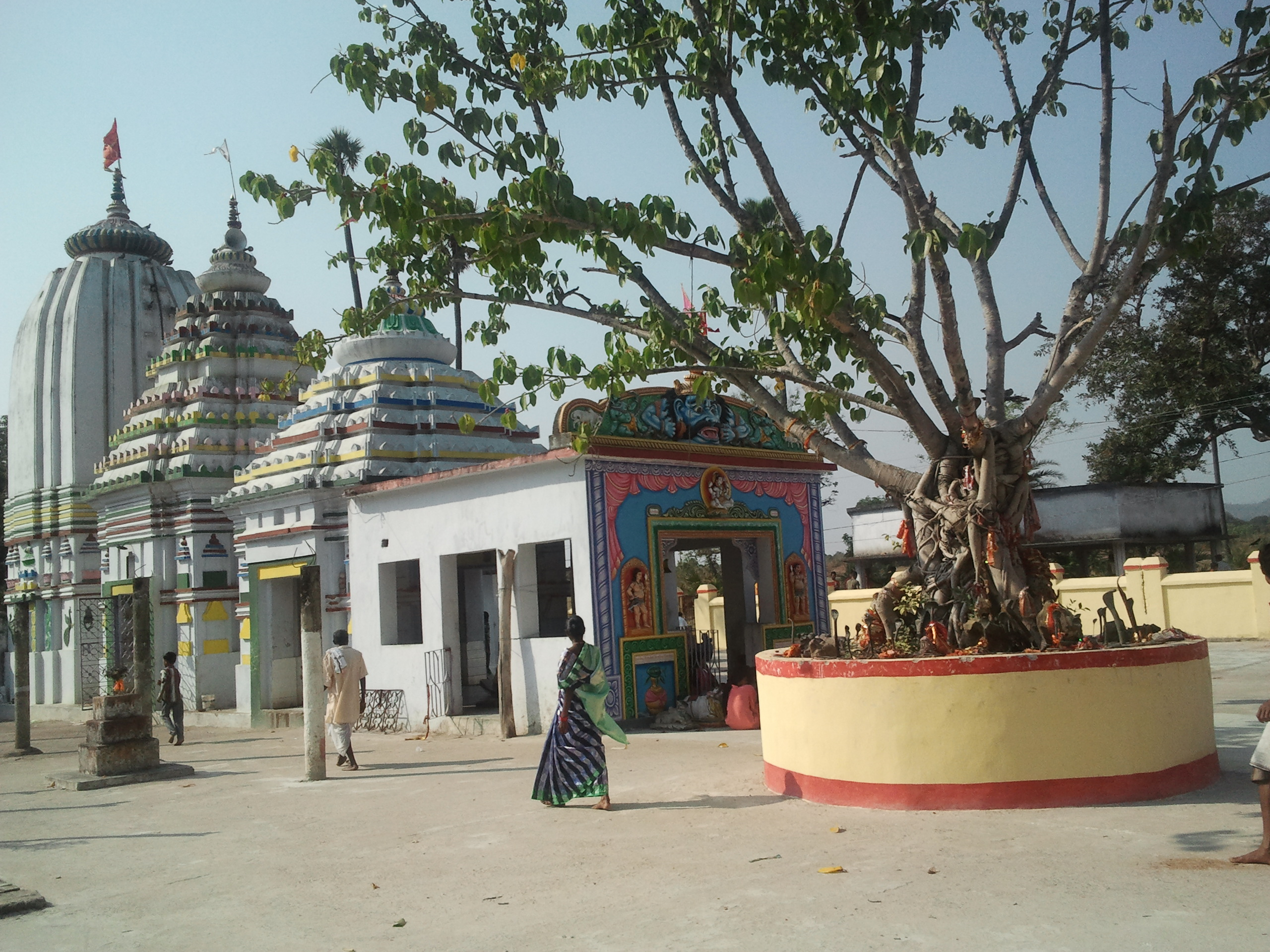
Deulajhari Shiva Temple, built by Raja Kishore Chandra

At the recognition of Athmallik as a princely state, its ruler was given the style of Raja. The royal dynasty of Athmallik may have descended from the Kadamba dynasty as a branch of the Bonai royal family. The Athmallik dynasty's emblem was a flower of the Kadamba tree bearing an umbrella and two swords. Its presiding deity was Parvati.

The Deo Samant Raja of Athmallik were Lakshmidhar (1785-1802); Jogindra (1852-1879); Mahendra (1876-1901); Bibhendra (1901-1918) and Kishore Chandra (3 November 1918 – 1 January 1948).

Mahendra was the only ruler of the Athmallik dynasty to be styled Maharaja. This was due to his efforts to advance Athmallik through promotion of agriculture and education. Between 1873 and the census of 1881, the population of Athmallik increased by 49.8%. Population growth was also seen at the 1901 census. Rajas of Athmallik maintained a military force of around 360 soldiers or Paikas (state militia) as sanctioned by the British administration/government for guard and escort duties or for appearance in other occasions.

In 1901, Athmallik represented a land area of 730 square miles. There were no towns but 460 villages. The population was 40,753 which was an increase of 28.9 percent from 1891. The literacy rate was 1.4%.

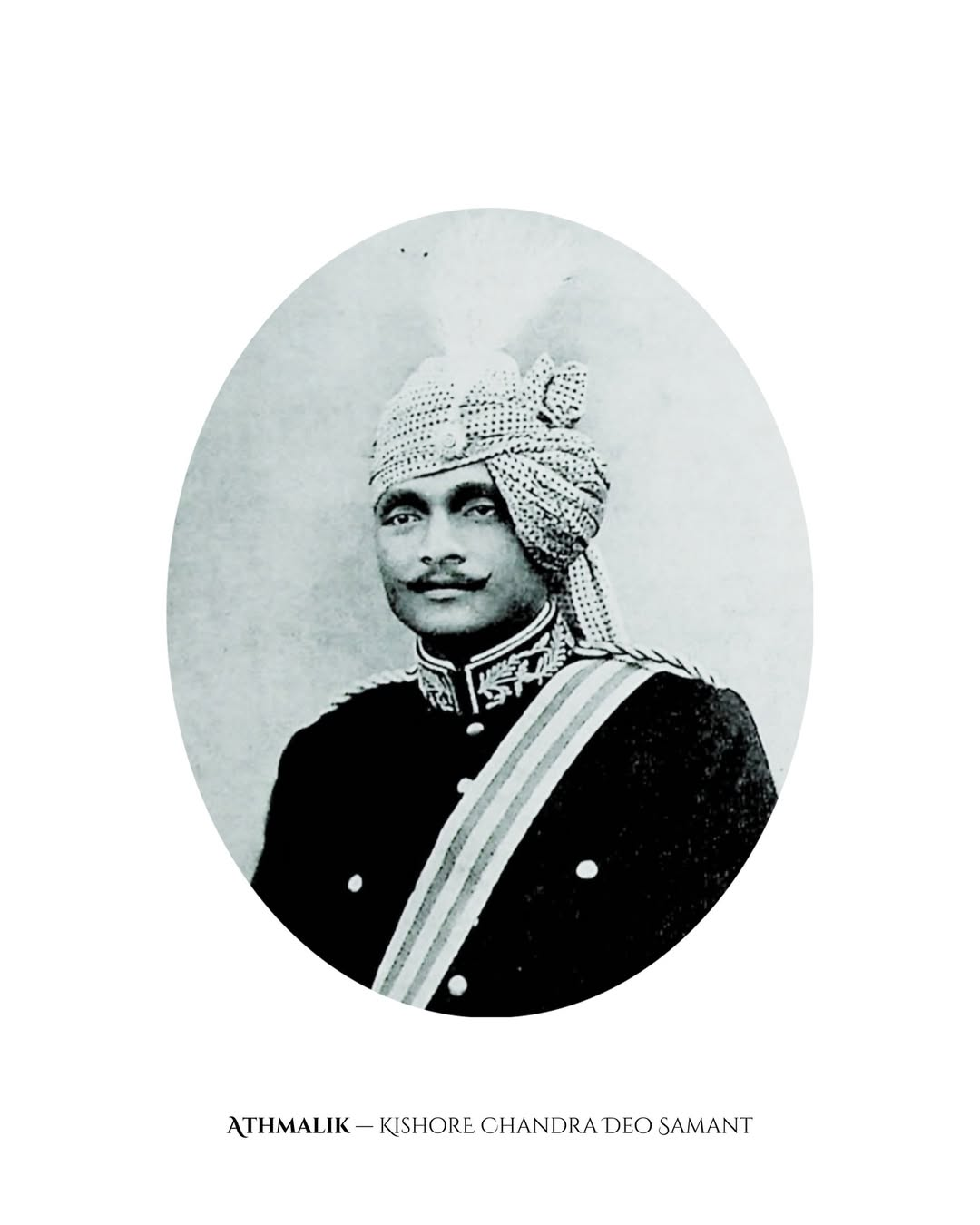
Raja Kishore Chandra

Kishore Chandra was the last princely ruler of Athmallik. On 1 January 1948, he signed the Instrument of Accession by which Athmallik entered the Indian Union of States. Athmallik then merged with Odisha state as part of the Dhenkanal district. On 1 April 1999, Dhenkanal was divided creating the Angul district where Athmallik was a subdivsion.

== See also ==
- Eastern States Agency
