= Khandpara State =

Princely state in Odisha, India

Coordinates: 20°15′50″N 85°12′51″E

- Princely State of British India
- 1599–1948
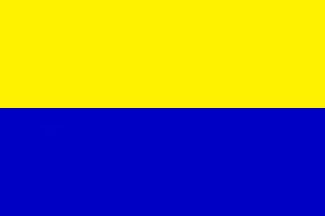
- Flag

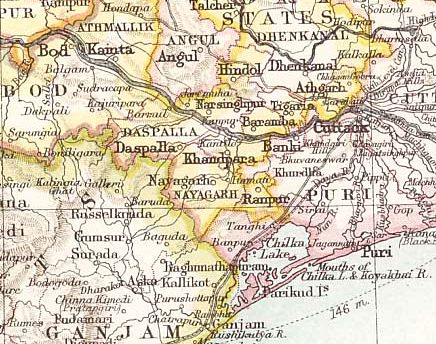
- Khandpara State in the Imperial Gazetteer of India
- Area
  - 1901: 632 km^{2} (244 sq mi)
- Population
  - 1901: 77,929
- History
  - Established: 1599
  - Accession to the Union of India: 1948
Succeeded by
India

Khandpara State was one of the princely states of India in the British Raj. It was located in present-day Nayagarh district, Odisha.

The state was bounded in the north by the Mahanadi River. The main town was Kantilo, but the capital was at Khandpara.

== History ==
Khandpara State is said to have been founded by Jadunath Singh Mangaraj, the youngest son of Raja Raghunath Singh of Nayagarh, who retained possession of four Garhs or forts, as his share, viz. Kadua, Ghuntasahi, Saradhapur, and Khedapada, which are located in Nayagarh region. Jadunath Singh is also said to have received the title Mangaraj from the Gajapati Maharaja. In the reign of Raja Narayan Singh Mangraj, Khandpara extended on the east up to Banki, on the west to Balaramprasad in Daspalla, on the north to Kantilo, and on the south up to Jogiapali.

The last ruler signed the instrument of accession to the Indian Union on 1 January 1948, merging the former princely state into Odisha, forming a part of the Nayagarh district.

== Rulers ==
The rulers of Khandpara State bore the title of Raja. The emblem of the Khandpara royal family was the head of a tiger; state symbols were identical in neighboring Nayagarh State.

- Jadunath Singh Mangaraj (1599 – 1675)
- Narayan Singh Mangaraj (1675 – 1709)
- Balunkeshwar Singh Mangaraj (1709 – 1723)
- Banamali Singh Mardaraj Bhramarbar Rai (1723 – 1732)
- Bairagi Singh Mardaraj Bhramarbar Rai (1734 – 1770)
- Niladri Singh Mardaraj Bhramarbar Rai (1770 – 1794)
- Narasimha Singh Mardaraj Bhramarbar Rai (1794 – 1815)
- Purushottam Mardaraj Bhramarbar Rai (1815 – 1821)
- Krushna Chandra Singh Bhramarbar Rai (1821 – 1842)
- Kunja Bihari Singh Bhramarbar Rai (1842 – 28 February 1867)
- Natabar Mardaraj Bhramarbar Rai (28 February 1867 – 1905)
- Ram Chandra Singh Mardaraj Bhramarbar Rai (1905 – 26 December 1922)
- Harihar Singh Mardaraj Bhramarbar Rai (26 December 1922 – 1 January 1948)

=== Titular ===
- Harihar Singh Mardaraj Bhramarbar Rai (1 January 1948 – 1977)
- Bibhuti Bhusan Singh Mardaraj Bhramarbar Rai (1977 – current)

== See also ==
- Eastern States Agency
- Political integration of India
