= Baramba State =

Coordinates: 20°25′15″N 85°22′41″E

Baramba State ବଡମ୍ବା ରାଜ୍ୟ
- Princely State of British India
- 1305–1948
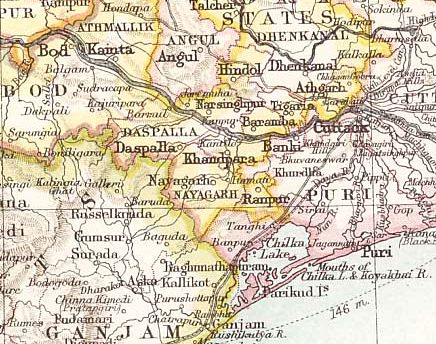
- Baramba State in the Imperial Gazetteer of India
- Area
  - 1892: 368 km^{2} (142 sq mi)
- Population
  - 1892: 29,772
- History
  - Established: 1305
  - Accession to the Union of India: 1948
Succeeded by
India
- Today part of: Odisha, India

Baramba State (Odia: ବଡମ୍ବା ରାଜ୍ୟ) was one of the princely states of India during the British Raj. It had its capital in Baramba town. The last ruler acceded to the Indian Union on 1 January 1948. Baramba state was made part of Cuttack district of Odisha in 1948.

== History ==
According to family and court records, Baramba State was founded in 1305 when the land comprising two villages, Sonkha and Mohuri, was granted by the then Eastern Ganga emperor Narasimha Deva II, to a wrestler Hatakeshwar Raut in recognition for his valour. The last ruler of Baramba Princely State signed the accession to the Indian Union on 1 January 1948.

== See also ==
- Eastern States Agency
- Political integration of India
