= Bonai State =

Indian princely state

Coordinates: 21.75°N 84.97°E

Bonai State ବଣାଇ
- Princely State of British India
- 16th century–1948
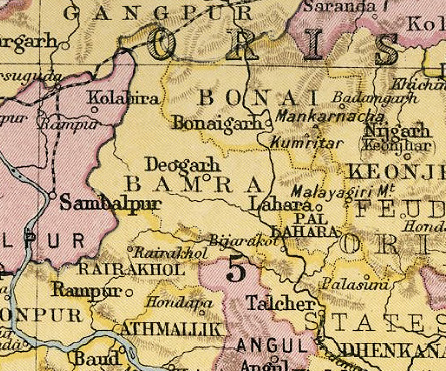
- Bonai State in the Imperial Gazetteer of India
- Area
  - 1892: 8,907 km^{2} (3,439 sq mi)
- Population
  - 1892: 24,026
- History
  - Established: 16th century
  - Accession to the Union of India: 1948
Succeeded by
India

Bonai State (Odia: ବଣାଇ) was a minor princely state during the British Raj in what is today India. It was one of the Chota Nagpur States and had its capital at Bonaigarh, located in the present-day Sundergarh district of Odisha. It had an area of 8,907 square kilometres (3,439 sq mi), a population of 24,026 in 1892 and an average annual revenue of Rs. 60,000 in 1901.

== History ==
=== Origins of the Kadamba dynasty of Bonai ===
As per legend, the founders of the dynasty claimed numerous obscure origins but lack of written archival records dispute them as untenable due to the mythical legends which shrouds the ancestry of the founding clans. Most research into the origins of the dynasty points that the founders of the Bonai State belonged to the head of the Bhuyan clans of the region which was later acquired mythical characteristics.

The founding of the Bonai State led to the establishment of the Kadamba dynasty, named after the flowers of the Kadamba tree (Neolamarckia cadamba) which is also present in the founding legendary myths of the dynasty and also remains the symbol of one of its collateral branch of Athmallik State. The Kadamba tree also plays a central element in the legends of the dominant Bhuyan clans of the region demonstrating the close relationship that the clans play in the royal traditions and rituals of the dynasty. Reconstruction of the court records points that the founder of the dynasty Pratap Bhanu Deo founded the State with the help of local Bhuyan landlords and subjugated the region. The local Bhuyan landlords maintained a strong presence at the royal court, administrative levels and socio-religious traditions of the kingdom.

=== Modern period ===
On 1 January 1948 the last ruler of Bonai signed the certificate of accession to the Indian Union after independence and following which it merged with the state of Odisha (then Orissa). It is located in Western Odisha, forming a part of the Sundergarh district. The Bonai region is mostly inhabited by Sambalpuri speaking people.

== Rulers ==
The rulers of the Bonai State of Kadamba dynasty:

- Pratap Bhanu Deo
- ...
- Dayanidhi Chandra Deo (1804–1851)
- Chandra Deo (1851–12 September 1876)
- Indra Deo (12 September 1876 – 1898)
- Nilambar Chandra Deo (1898 – 19 February 1902)
- Dharani Dhar Deo (19 February 1902 – 1 January 1948)

=== Titular ===
- Dharani Dhar Deo (1948)
- Kadamba Keshari Chandra Deo (1948 – 17 December 2002)
- Bir Keshari Deo (17 December 2002 – current)

== See also ==
- Eastern States Agency
- Chota Nagpur States
