= Imperial Gazetteer of India =

Gazetteer of the British Raj in India

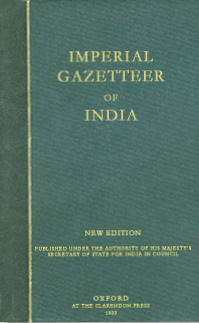
- Cover of the 1937 edition, published by the Clarendon Press, Oxford
- Publication date: 1881; 145 years ago
- Media type: gazetteer
- Text: Imperial Gazetteer of India at Wikisource

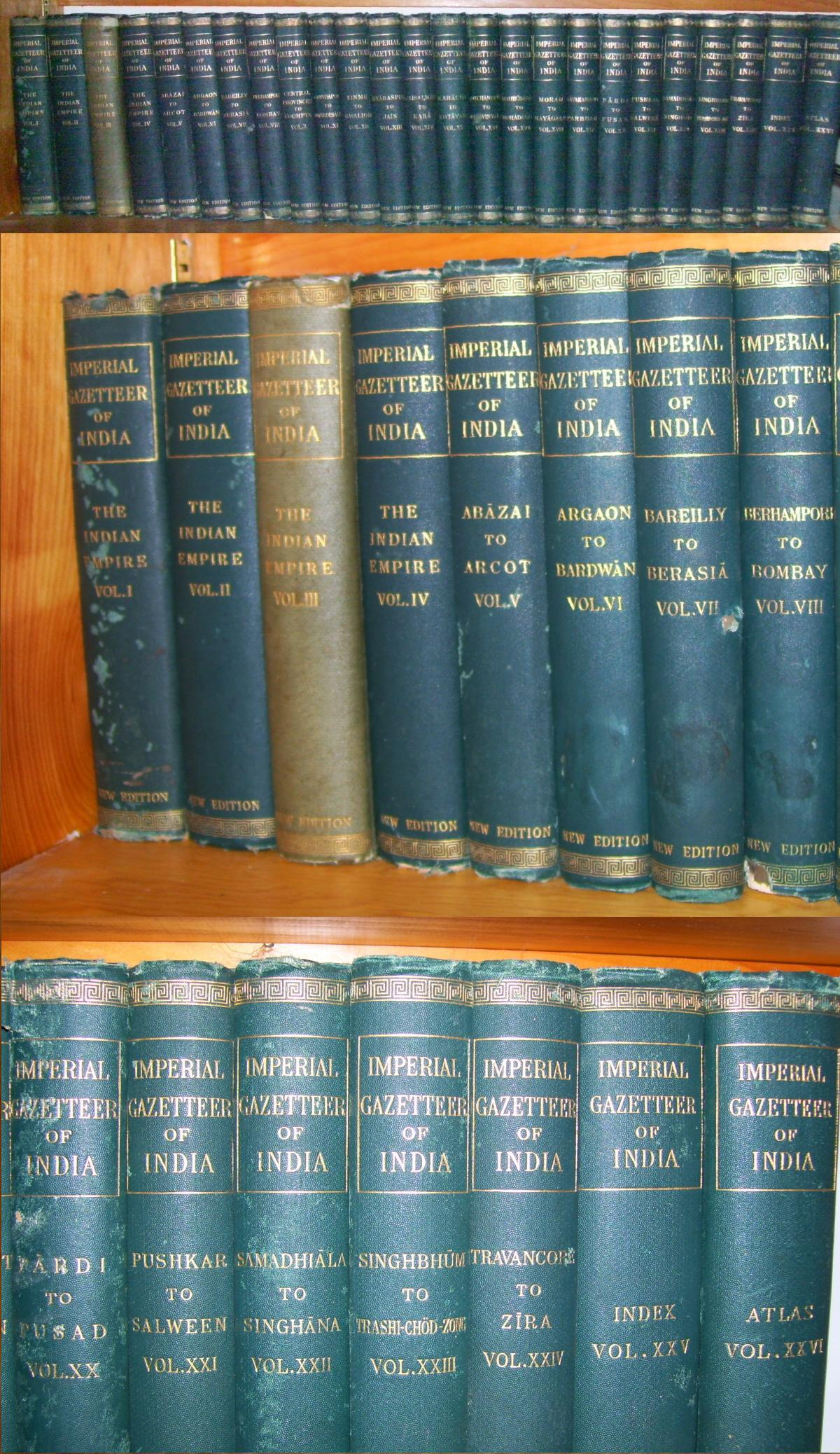
The 1908 edition, in 26 volumes, including the first four encyclopaedic volumes entitled Indian Empire: Descriptive, Historical, Economic and Administrative, and the last volume (26), Atlas.

The Imperial Gazetteer of India was a gazetteer of the British Indian Empire, and is now a historical reference work. It was first published in 1881. Sir William Wilson Hunter made the original plans of the book, starting in 1869.

The 1908, 1909 and 1931 "New Editions" have four encyclopedic volumes covering the geography, history, economics, and administration of India; 20 volumes of the alphabetically arranged gazetteer, listing places' names and providing statistics and summary information; and one volume each comprising the index and atlas. The New Editions were all published by the Oxford University Press, Oxford, UK.

== Editions ==
The first edition of the Imperial Gazetteer of India was published in nine volumes in 1881. A second edition, augmented to fourteen volumes, was issued in the years 1885–87. After the death of Sir William Wilson Hunter in 1900, Sir Herbert Hope Risley, William Stevenson Meyer, Sir Richard Burn and James Sutherland Cotton compiled the twenty-six volume Imperial Gazetteer of India.

A revised form of the article on India, greatly enlarged and with statistics brought up to date, appeared as an independent volume in 1893, under the title of The Indian Empire: Its Peoples, History, and Products.

All of these were edited by Hunter, who formed the original plan of the work in 1869. A parallel series of publications known as the Imperial Gazetteer of India: Provincial Series was prepared.

== Volumes ==
- William Wilson Hunter (1881). The Imperial Gazetteer of India (1st ed.). London: Trübner & Co.
  - v. 1: A–B
  - v. 2: B-C
  - v. 3: C–G
  - v. 4: G–J
  - v. 5: J–K
  - v. 6: K–N
  - v. 7: N–R
  - v. 8: R–T
  - v. 9: T–Z
- William Wilson Hunter (1885). Imperial Gazetteer of India (2nd ed.). London: Trübner.
  - v. 1: A–B
  - v. 2: B
  - v. 3: B–C
  - v. 4: C–G
  - v. 5: G–I
  - v. 6: I
  - v. 7: I–K
  - v. 8: K–M
  - v. 9: M
  - v. 10: M–P
  - v. 11: P–R
  - v. 12: R–S
  - v. 13: S–Z
  - v. 14: Index
- Imperial Gazetteer of India (New ed.). Oxford: Clarendon Press. 1908–1909.
  - v. 1: Descriptive
  - v. 2: Historical
  - v. 3: Economic
  - v. 4: Administrative
  - v. 5: Abazai–Arcot
  - v. 6: Argaon–Bardwan
  - v. 7: Bareilly–Berasia
  - v. 8: Berhampore–Bombay
  - v. 9: Bomjur–Central India
  - v. 10: Central Provinces–Coompta
  - v. 11: Coondapoor–Edwardesabad
  - v. 12: Einmen–Gwalior
  - v. 13: Gyaraspur–Jais
  - v. 14: Jaisalmer–Kara
  - v. 15: Karachi–Kotayam
  - v. 16: Kotchandpur–Mahavinyaka
  - v. 17: Mahbubabad–Moradabad
  - v. 18: Moram–Nayagarh
  - v. 19: Nayakanhatti–Parbhani
  - v. 20: Pardi–Pusad
  - v. 21: Pushkar–Salween
  - v. 22: Samadhiala–Singhana
  - v. 23: Singhbhum–Trashi-Chod-Zong
  - v. 24: Travancore–Zira
  - v. 25: Index
  - v. 26: Atlas

== See also ==
- The Gazette of India
