= 2nd Orissa Provincial Assembly =

2nd Provisional state legislature of the Indian state of Orissa

←	1st Provincial Assembly	1st Assembly	→
- Flag of British Raj

Overview
- Meeting place: Ravenshaw College Hall, Cuttack, Odisha, India
- Term: 18 April 1946 – 20 February 1952
- Election: 1946
- Government: Indian National Congress
- Website: assembly.odisha.gov.in

Orissa Provincial Assembly
- House Composition as on 1946
- Members: 60 (till 9/9/1949); 91 (after 9/9/1949) (Note: On the 9th September 1949, the Governor-General of India nominated 31 persons to fill the additional seats in the Orissa Provincial Legislative Assembly to represent the people of 26 Gadajat States who joined India by singing Instrument of Accession. It increased house strength to 91.)
- Governor: Chandulal Madhavlal Trivedi; Kailash Nath Katju; Asaf Ali; V. P. Menon (Acting)
- Speaker: Lal Mohan Patnaik, INC
- Deputy Speaker: Adruti Lakshmi Bai, INC
- Leader of the House (Prime Minister): Harekrushna Mahatab, INC; Nabakrushna Choudhuri, INC
- Party control: Indian National Congress (47/60) (till 9/9/1949) (47/91) (after 9/9/1949)
- 14 sessions with 224 sitting days

The Second Orissa Provincial Assembly was convened after the 1946 Indian provincial elections.

== House Composition ==
Party	Strength
Indian National Congress	47
All India Muslim League	4
Communist Party of India	1
Nominated	4
Independent	4
No Party Affiliation	31

== Office Bearers ==
Post	Portrait	Name	Tenure		Party
Governor		Chandulal Madhavlal Trivedi	Assembly Begins	14 August 1947	N/A
Governor		Kailash Nath Katju	15 August 1947	20 June 1948	N/A
Governor		Asaf Ali	21 June 1948	5 May 1951	N/A
Governor		V. P. Menon (Acting)	6 May 1951	17 July 1951	N/A
Governor		Asaf Ali	18 July 1951	Assembly Dissolves	N/A
Speaker		Lal Mohan Patnaik; Member from Indian Christian Orissa	29 May 1946	6 March 1952	Indian National Congress
Deputy Speaker		Adruti Lakshmi Bai; Member from Berhampur Town	29 May 1946	20 February 1952	Indian National Congress
Prime Minister		Harekrushna Mahatab; Member from East Bhadrak	23 April 1946	12 May 1950	Indian National Congress
Prime Minister		Nabakrushna Choudhuri; Member from North Kendrapara	12 May 1950	20 February 1952	Indian National Congress

== Council of Ministers ==
=== First Harekrushna Mahatab Ministry ===
Portfolio	Portrait	Name Constituency	Tenure		Party
Prime Minister; Home; Finance; Planning & Reconstruction		Harekrushna Mahatab; Member from East Bhadrak	23 April 1946	25 January 1950	Indian National Congress
Chief Minister; Home; Finance; Planning & Reconstruction		Harekrushna Mahatab; Member from East Bhadrak	26 January 1950	12 May 1950	Indian National Congress
Revenue; Supply and Transport		Harekrushna Mahatab; Member from East Bhadrak	23 April 1948	19 August 1948	Indian National Congress
Public Relation		Harekrushna Mahatab; Member from East Bhadrak	16 November 1949	12 May 1950	Indian National Congress
Law; Development		Nityanand Kanungo; Member from South Cuttack Sadar	23 April 1946	12 May 1950	Indian National Congress
Local Self Government		Nityanand Kanungo; Member from South Cuttack Sadar	23 April 1946	1 September 1946	Indian National Congress
Commerce; Labour		Nityanand Kanungo; Member from South Cuttack Sadar	1 September 1946	12 May 1950	Indian National Congress
Public Works		Nityanand Kanungo; Member from South Cuttack Sadar	23 June 1947	7 August 1947	Indian National Congress
Education; Health		Pandit Lingaraj Misra; Member from North Puri Sadar	23 April 1946	12 May 1950	Indian National Congress
Local Self-Government		Pandit Lingaraj Misra; Member from North Puri Sadar	1 September 1946	12 May 1950	Indian National Congress
Revenue; Supply & Transport		Nabakrushna Choudhuri; Member from North Kendrapara	23 April 1946	23 April 1948	Indian National Congress
Revenue; Supply & Transport		Sadasiba Tripathy; Member from Nawarangpur	19 August 1948	12 May 1950	Indian National Congress
Commerce; Labour		Radhakrushna Biswasroy; Member from Koraput	23 April 1946	1 September 1946	Indian National Congress
Public Works		Radhakrushna Biswasroy; Member from Koraput	23 April 1946	22 June 1947	Indian National Congress
Minister Without Portfolio		Radhakrushna Biswasroy; Member from Koraput	23 June 1947	6 August 1947	Indian National Congress
Public Works		Radhakrushna Biswasroy; Member from Koraput	7 August 1947	28 February 1948	Indian National Congress
Backward Classes Welfare		Radhakrushna Biswasroy; Member from Koraput	13 September 1947	13 July 1948	Indian National Congress
Public Works		Lal Ranjit Singh Bariha; Member from East Bargarh	28 February 1948	16 November 1949	Indian National Congress
Backward Classes Welfare		Lal Ranjit Singh Bariha; Member from East Bargarh	13 July 1948	19 August 1948	Indian National Congress
Rural Welfare		Lal Ranjit Singh Bariha; Member from East Bargarh	16 November 1949	12 May 1950	Indian National Congress
Backward Classes Welfare		Rajakrushna Bose; Member from East Kendrapara	19 August 1948	16 November 1949	Indian National Congress
Publicity; Roads and Buildings; Irrigation and Drainage; Electricity		Rajakrushna Bose; Member from East Kendrapara	16 November 1949	12 May 1950	Indian National Congress

=== First Nabakrushna Choudhuri Ministry ===
Portfolio	Portrait	Name Constituency	Tenure		Party
Chief Minister; Finance; Relief & Rehabilitation; River Valley Development		Nabakrushna Choudhuri; Member from North Kendrapara	12 May 1950	20 February 1952	Indian National Congress
Agriculture; Forestry; Excise; Local Self Government; Co-operation		Nabakrushna Choudhuri; Member from North Kendrapara	12 May 1950	11 November 1950	Indian National Congress
Home; Planning		Nabakrushna Choudhuri; Member from North Kendrapara	11 November 1950	20 February 1952	Indian National Congress
Local Self Government		Nabakrushna Choudhuri; Member from North Kendrapara	15 November 1951	20 February 1952	Indian National Congress
Law; Industries		Nityanand Kanungo; Member from South Cuttack Sadar	12 May 1950	20 February 1952	Indian National Congress
Home; Planning		Nityanand Kanungo; Member from South Cuttack Sadar	12 May 1950	11 November 1950	Indian National Congress
Education; Health		Pandit Lingaraj Misra; Member from North Puri Sadar	12 May 1950	20 February 1952	Indian National Congress
Tribal & Rural Welfare		Lal Ranjit Singh Bariha; Member from East Bargarh	12 May 1950	20 February 1952	Indian National Congress
Roads and Buildings; Irrigation and Drainage; Electricity		Raja Krushna Bose; Member from East Kendrapara	12 May 1950	15 November 1951	Indian National Congress
Transport		Raja Krushna Bose; Member from East Kendrapara	1 September 1950	11 November 1950	Indian National Congress
Transport; Works		Raja Krushna Bose; Member from East Kendrapara	15 November 1951	20 February 1952	Indian National Congress
Revenue; Supply		Sadasiba Tripathy; Member from Nawarangpur	12 May 1950	20 February 1952	Indian National Congress
Transport		Sadasiba Tripathy; Member from Nawarangpur	12 May 1950	15 November 1951	Indian National Congress
Excise		Sadasiba Tripathy; Member from Nawarangpur	11 November 1950	20 February 1952	Indian National Congress
Commerce; Labour; Public Relations		Pabitra Mohan Pradhan; Member from Athgarh	12 May 1950	20 February 1952	No Party Affiliation
Local Self Government		Kapileswar Prasad Nanda; Member from Patna	12 May 1950	15 November 1951	No Party Affiliation
Development		Kapileswar Prasad Nanda; Member from Patna	15 November 1951	20 February 1952	No Party Affiliation

== Members of Provincial Assembly ==
Source
#	Constituency	Member	Party	Remarks
Cuttack District
1	East Cuttack Sadar	Sarangadhar Das	Indian National Congress	
1	East Cuttack Sadar	Narayan Birabar Samanta	Indian National Congress	Won in bypoll.
2	North Cuttack Sadar	Bhairab Chandra Mohanty	Indian National Congress	
3	North Cuttack Sadar (SC)	Kanhu Charan Das	Indian National Congress	
4	Central Cuttack Sadar	Biju Patnaik	Indian National Congress	
5	West Cuttack Sadar	Gouranga Charan Das	Indian National Congress	
6	South Cuttack Sadar	Nityananda Kanungo	Indian National Congress	Minister
7	Angul	Hrusikesh Tripathy	Indian National Congress	
8	Central Kendrapara	Dinabandhu Sahoo	Indian National Congress	
9	East Kendrapara	Raj Krushna Bose	Indian National Congress	Minister
10	North Kendrapara	Nabakrushna Choudhuri	Indian National Congress	Chief Minister
11	East Jajpur	Gadadhar Dutta	Indian National Congress	
12	East Jajpur (SC)	Santanu Kumar Das	Indian National Congress	
13	North Jajpur	Madan Mohan Patnaik	Indian National Congress	
14	West Jajpur	Dwarakanath Das	Indian National Congress	
Puri District
15	East Puri Sadar	Jayakrushna Mohanty	Indian National Congress	
16	North Puri Sadar	Lingaraj Misra	Indian National Congress	Minister
17	North Puri Sadar (SC)	Purnananda Samal	Indian National Congress	
18	South Puri Sadar	Lokanath Mishra	Indian National Congress	
19	East Khurda	Banamali Patnaik	Indian National Congress	
20	West Khurda	Shatyabadi Nanda	Indian National Congress	
Balasore District
21	Central Balasore Sadar	Surendra Nath Das	Indian National Congress	
2 2	North Balasore Sadar	Karunakar Panigrahi	Indian National Congress	
23	South Balasore Sadar	Kailash Chandra Mohanty	Indian National Congress	
24	East Bhadrak	Harekrushna Mahatab	Indian National Congress	Chief Minister, Resigned to join First Nehru ministry
24	East Bhadrak	Sahadev Das	Indian National Congress	Elected in bypoll.
25	West Bhadrak	Bhagabat Sahu	Indian National Congress	
26	West Bhadrak (SC)	Brundabana Das	Indian National Congress	
Sambalpur District
27	Sambalpur Sadar	Bodh Ram Dube	Indian National Congress	Resigned.
27	Sambalpur Sadar	Shraddhakar Supakar	Indian National Congress	Elected in bypoll.
28	Sambalpur Sadar (BT)	Mohan Singh	Indian National Congress	
29	East Bargarh	Lakshmi Narayan Mishra	Indian National Congress	
30	East Bargarh (SC)	Bisi Ganda	Indian National Congress	
31	West Bargarh	Lal Ranjit Singh Bariha	Indian National Congress	
32	Khariar	Artatrano Deo	Independent	
Ganjam District
33	Berhampur (Group 1)	Uma Charan Patnaik	Indian National Congress	
34	Berhampur (Group 2)	Somanath Panda	Indian National Congress	
35	Berhampur (Group 3)	Narayan Murty Gade	Indian National Congress	
36	Paralakimedi	Ananta Tripathy Sarma	Indian National Congress	
37	Ghumsur	Dinabandhu Behera	Indian National Congress	
38	Kudala	Jagannath Mishra	Indian National Congress	
39	Chatrapur	Narayan Panda	Indian National Congress	
40	Aska Suruda	Madhusudan Mohapatra	Indian National Congress	
41	Aska Suruda (SC)	Iswar Naik	Indian National Congress	
Koraput District
42	Jeypore Malkangiri	Radhamohan Sahu	Indian National Congress	
43	Nawarangpur	Sadasiba Tripathy	Indian National Congress	
44	Koraput	Radhakrushna Biswasray	Indian National Congress	Minister
45	Baliguda Khondmals	Narayan Patra	Indian National Congress	
Muhammadan Constituencies
46	Cuttack Sadar	Mahammed Yusuf	All-India Muslim League	
47	North Cuttack cum Anugul	Saiyid Fazle Haque	All-India Muslim League	
48	Balasore cum Sambalpur	Mahammed Khan	All-India Muslim League	
49	South Orissa	Latifur Rahman	All-India Muslim League	
Woman Constituencies
50	Cuttack Town	Priyambada Devi	Indian National Congress	
51	Berhampur Town	Adruti Lakshmi Bai	Indian National Congress	Deputy Speaker
Land Holder Constituencies
52	East Orissa	Raja Sailendra Narayan Bhanja Deo	Independent	
53	West Orissa	Raibahadur Lokanath Mishra	Independent	
Other Reserved Constituencies
54	Indian Christian Orissa	Lal Mohan Patnaik	Indian National Congress	Speaker
55	Commerce and Industry Orissa	Ghanshyam Das Thirani	Independent	
56	Labour Orissa	Baidyanath Rath	Communist Party of India	
Nominated Members
57	Nominated	Lakshmi Narayan Sahoo	No Party Affiliation	
58	Nominated	Anne Catherine Munro	No Party Affiliation	
59	Nominated	Godavarthi Ramdas	No Party Affiliation	
60	Nominated	Antarjyami Mallick	No Party Affiliation	
Members from Gadjat States
61	Baudh	Mohan Misra	No Party Affiliation	
62	Athmallik	Dasaratha Pradhan	No Party Affiliation	
63	Hindol, Narsinghpur, Khandpara	Radhanath Rath	No Party Affiliation	
64	Dhenkanal	Surendra Mohan Patnaik	No Party Affiliation	
65	Dhenkanal	Mahesh Chandra Subahusingh	No Party Affiliation	
66	Kalahandi	Kaliprasad Babu	No Party Affiliation	
67	Kalahandi	Gajanan Nayak	No Party Affiliation	
68	Kalahandi	Thatraja Rudra Pratap Singh Deo	No Party Affiliation	
69	Kalahandi	Utsabananda Pradhan	No Party Affiliation	
70	Rairakhol, Sonepur	Sashibhusan Pradhan	No Party Affiliation	
71	Bamra	Jallandhar Deb	No Party Affiliation	
72	Patna	Ram Charan Patel	No Party Affiliation	
73	Patna	Nimai Charan Panigrahi	No Party Affiliation	
74	Patna	Kapur Chand Naik	No Party Affiliation	
75	Patna	Kapileswar Prasad Nanda	No Party Affiliation	Minister
76	Sundergarh (Gangpur State)	Ram Charan Patel	No Party Affiliation	
77	Sundergarh (Gangpur State)	Shib Narayan Singh Mohapatra	No Party Affiliation	
78	Bonai	Narahari Dandapat	No Party Affiliation	
79	Keonjhar	Manikram Mahanto	No Party Affiliation	
80	Keonjhar	Laxmi Narayan Bhanja Deo	No Party Affiliation	
81	Mayurbhanj	Harish Chandra Das	No Party Affiliation	
82	Mayurbhanj	Gopinath Naik	No Party Affiliation	
83	Mayurbhanj	Lal Mohan Pati	No Party Affiliation	
84	Mayurbhanj	Siris Chandra Das	No Party Affiliation	
85	Mayurbhanj	Mangovind Pati	No Party Affiliation	
86	Mayurbhanj	Sarat Chandra Das	No Party Affiliation	
87	Nilgiri	Kirtan Behari Mohanty	No Party Affiliation	
88	Nilgiri	Sarat Chandra Mohanty	No Party Affiliation	
89	Athgarh	Pabitra Mohan Pradhan	No Party Affiliation	Minister
90	Ranpur	Antarjyami Sahu	No Party Affiliation	
91	Nayagarh	Sridhar Das	No Party Affiliation	
