= First Harekrushna Mahatab ministry =

Government of Odisha (1946 – 1950)

- 4th Ministry of Orissa
- 1946 – 1950
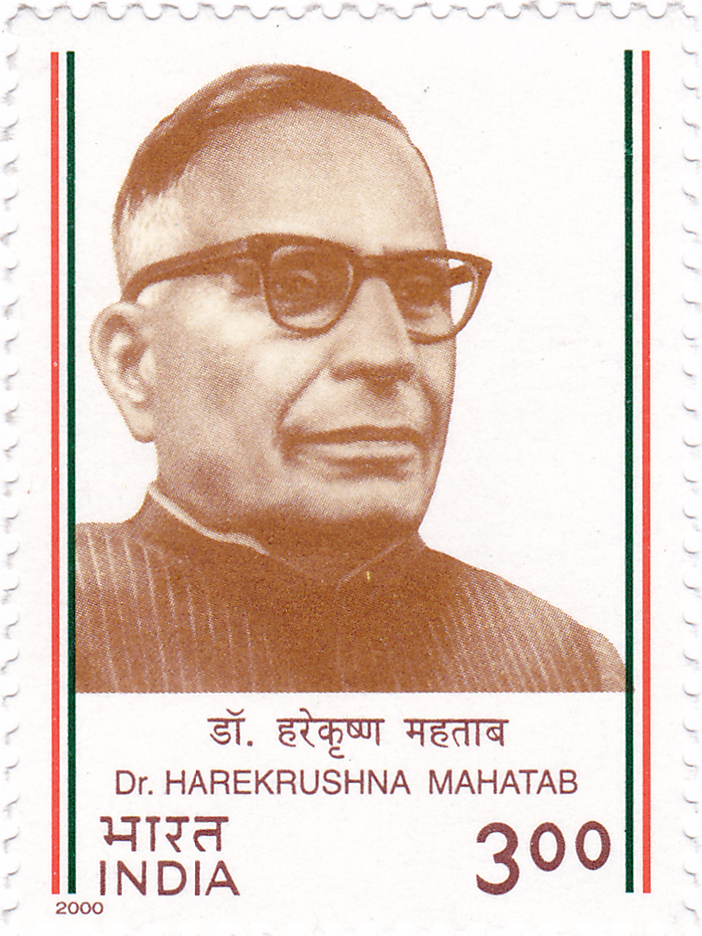
- Harekrushna Mahatab; Hon'ble Chief Minister of Orissa
- Date formed: 23 April 1946
- Date dissolved: 12 May 1950

People and organisations
- Governor: Chandulal Madhavlal Trivedi
- Chief Minister: Harekrushna Mahatab
- No. of ministers: 8
- Member parties: Indian National Congress

History
- Incoming formation: 2nd Provincial Assembly
- Outgoing formation: 1st Provincial Assembly
- Election: 1946 Provincial election
- Legislature terms: 4 years, 19 days
- Predecessor: Second Krushna Chandra Gajapati ministry
- Successor: First Nabakrushna Choudhuri ministry

Harekrushna Mahatab was sworn in as the prime minister of Orissa following Congress victory in 1946 Provincial election.

== Brief history ==
Shri Mahatab along with 4 Cabinet ministers were administered the oath of office by Governor Chandulal Madhavlal Trivedi on 23 April 1946.

Shri Mahatab resigned on 12 May 1950 to join First Nehru ministry.

== Council of Ministers ==
Portfolio	Portrait	Name Constituency	Tenure		Party
Prime Minister; Home; Finance; Planning & Reconstruction		Harekrushna Mahatab; Member from East Bhadrak	23 April 1946	25 January 1950	Indian National Congress
Chief Minister; Home; Finance; Planning & Reconstruction		Harekrushna Mahatab; Member from East Bhadrak	26 January 1950	12 May 1950	Indian National Congress
Revenue; Supply and Transport		Harekrushna Mahatab; Member from East Bhadrak	23 April 1948	19 August 1948	Indian National Congress
Public Relation		Harekrushna Mahatab; Member from East Bhadrak	16 November 1949	12 May 1950	Indian National Congress
Law; Development		Nityanand Kanungo; Member from South Cuttack Sadar	23 April 1946	12 May 1950	Indian National Congress
Local Self Government		Nityanand Kanungo; Member from South Cuttack Sadar	23 April 1946	1 September 1946	Indian National Congress
Commerce; Labour		Nityanand Kanungo; Member from South Cuttack Sadar	1 September 1946	12 May 1950	Indian National Congress
Public Works		Nityanand Kanungo; Member from South Cuttack Sadar	23 June 1947	7 August 1947	Indian National Congress
Education; Health		Pandit Lingaraj Misra; Member from North Puri Sadar	23 April 1946	12 May 1950	Indian National Congress
Local Self-Government		Pandit Lingaraj Misra; Member from North Puri Sadar	1 September 1946	12 May 1950	Indian National Congress
Revenue; Supply & Transport		Nabakrushna Choudhuri; Member from North Kendrapara	23 April 1946	23 April 1948	Indian National Congress
Revenue; Supply & Transport		Sadasiba Tripathy; Member from Nawarangpur	19 August 1948	12 May 1950	Indian National Congress
Commerce; Labour		Radhakrushna Biswasroy; Member from Koraput	23 April 1946	1 September 1946	Indian National Congress
Public Works		Radhakrushna Biswasroy; Member from Koraput	23 April 1946	22 June 1947	Indian National Congress
Minister Without Portfolio		Radhakrushna Biswasroy; Member from Koraput	23 June 1947	6 August 1947	Indian National Congress
Public Works		Radhakrushna Biswasroy; Member from Koraput	7 August 1947	28 February 1948	Indian National Congress
Backward Classes Welfare		Radhakrushna Biswasroy; Member from Koraput	13 September 1947	13 July 1948	Indian National Congress
Public Works		Lal Ranjit Singh Bariha; Member from East Bargarh	28 February 1948	16 November 1949	Indian National Congress
Backward Classes Welfare		Lal Ranjit Singh Bariha; Member from East Bargarh	13 July 1948	19 August 1948	Indian National Congress
Rural Welfare		Lal Ranjit Singh Bariha; Member from East Bargarh	16 November 1949	12 May 1950	Indian National Congress
Backward Classes Welfare		Rajakrushna Bose; Member from East Kendrapara	19 August 1948	16 November 1949	Indian National Congress
Publicity; Roads and Buildings; Irrigation and Drainage; Electricity		Rajakrushna Bose; Member from East Kendrapara	16 November 1949	12 May 1950	Indian National Congress

== Demographics ==
Division	District	Ministers	Cabinet Ministers
Central	Cuttack	3	Nabakrushna Choudhuri; Nityanand Kanungo; Rajakrushna Bose
Central	Puri	1	Pandit Lingaraj Misra
Central	Balasore	1	Harekrushna Mahatab (Chief Minister)
Central	Mayurbhanj	0	–
Northern	Sambalpur	1	Lal Ranjit Singh Bariha
Northern	Sundergarh	0	–
Northern	Keonjhar	0	–
Northern	Dhenkanal	0	–
Northern	Balangir	0	–
Southern	Ganjam	0	–
Southern	Kalahandi	0	–
Southern	Koraput	2	Sadashiva Tripathy; Radhakrushna Biswasroy
Southern	Phulbani	0	–
