= First Nabakrushna Choudhuri ministry =

Government of Odisha (1950 – 1952)

- 5th Ministry of Orissa
- 1950 – 1952
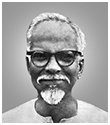
- Nabakrushna Choudhuri; Hon'ble Chief Minister of Orissa
- Date formed: 12 May 1950
- Date dissolved: 20 February 1952

People and organisations
- Governor: Asaf Ali
- Chief Minister: Nabakrushna Choudhuri
- No. of ministers: 8
- Member parties: Indian National Congress

History
- Incoming formation: 2nd Provincial Assembly
- Election: 1946 Provincial election
- Legislature terms: 1 year, 284 days
- Predecessor: First Harekrushna Mahatab ministry
- Successor: Second Nabakrushna Choudhuri ministry

Nabakrushna Choudhuri was sworn in as the chief minister of Orissa for the first time following resignation of Harekrushna Mahatab.

== Brief history ==
Shri Choudhuri along with 6 Cabinet ministers were administered the oath of office by Governor Asaf Ali on 12 May 1950.

Following Cong win in 1952 Assembly election, Shri Choudhuri resigned on 20 February 1952.

== Council of Ministers ==
Portfolio	Portrait	Name Constituency	Tenure		Party
Chief Minister; Finance; Relief & Rehabilitation; River Valley Development		Nabakrushna Choudhuri; Member from North Kendrapara	12 May 1950	20 February 1952	Indian National Congress
Agriculture; Forestry; Excise; Local Self Government; Co-operation		Nabakrushna Choudhuri; Member from North Kendrapara	12 May 1950	11 November 1950	Indian National Congress
Home; Planning		Nabakrushna Choudhuri; Member from North Kendrapara	11 November 1950	20 February 1952	Indian National Congress
Local Self Government		Nabakrushna Choudhuri; Member from North Kendrapara	15 November 1951	20 February 1952	Indian National Congress
Law; Industries		Nityanand Kanungo; Member from South Cuttack Sadar	12 May 1950	20 February 1952	Indian National Congress
Home; Planning		Nityanand Kanungo; Member from South Cuttack Sadar	12 May 1950	11 November 1950	Indian National Congress
Education; Health		Pandit Lingaraj Misra; Member from North Puri Sadar	12 May 1950	20 February 1952	Indian National Congress
Tribal & Rural Welfare		Lal Ranjit Singh Bariha; Member from East Bargarh	12 May 1950	20 February 1952	Indian National Congress
Roads and Buildings; Irrigation and Drainage; Electricity		Raja Krushna Bose; Member from East Kendrapara	12 May 1950	15 November 1951	Indian National Congress
Transport		Raja Krushna Bose; Member from East Kendrapara	1 September 1950	11 November 1950	Indian National Congress
Transport; Works		Raja Krushna Bose; Member from East Kendrapara	15 November 1951	20 February 1952	Indian National Congress
Revenue; Supply		Sadasiba Tripathy; Member from Nawarangpur	12 May 1950	20 February 1952	Indian National Congress
Transport		Sadasiba Tripathy; Member from Nawarangpur	12 May 1950	15 November 1951	Indian National Congress
Excise		Sadasiba Tripathy; Member from Nawarangpur	11 November 1950	20 February 1952	Indian National Congress
Commerce; Labour; Public Relations		Pabitra Mohan Pradhan; Member from Athgarh	12 May 1950	20 February 1952	No Party Affiliation
Local Self Government		Kapileswar Prasad Nanda; Member from Patna	12 May 1950	15 November 1951	No Party Affiliation
Development		Kapileswar Prasad Nanda; Member from Patna	15 November 1951	20 February 1952	No Party Affiliation

== Demographics ==
Division	District	Ministers	Cabinet Ministers
Central	Cuttack	3	Nabakrushna Choudhuri (Chief Minister); Nityanand Kanungo; Rajakrushna Bose
Central	Puri	2	Rajbahdur Kishore Chandra Deo Bhanj; Pandit Lingaraj Misra
Central	Balasore	0	–
Central	Mayurbhanj	0	–
Northern	Sambalpur	1	Lal Ranjit Singh Bariha
Northern	Sundergarh	0	–
Northern	Keonjhar	0	–
Northern	Dhenkanal	1	Pabitra Mohan Pradhan
Northern	Balangir	1	Kapileswar Prasad Nanda
Southern	Ganjam	0	–
Southern	Kalahandi	0	–
Southern	Koraput	1	Sadashiva Tripathy
Southern	Phulbani	0	–
