= 1st Orissa Provincial Assembly =

1st Provisional state legislature of the Indian state of Orissa

2nd Provincial Assembly	→
- Flag of British Raj

Overview
- Meeting place: Ravenshaw College Hall, Cuttack, Odisha, India
- Term: 3 February 1937 – 14 September 1945
- Election: 1937
- Government: Indian National Congress
- Website: assembly.odisha.gov.in

Orissa Provincial Assembly
- House Composition as on 1937
- Members: 60
- Governor: Sir John Austen Hubback; George Townsend Boag(Acting); Sir Hawthorne Lewis
- Speaker: Mukunda Prasad Das, INC
- Deputy Speaker: Nanda Kishore Das, INC
- Leader of the House (Prime Minister): Krushna Chandra Gajapati, NP; Bishwanath Das, INC; Krushna Chandra Gajapati, NP
- Party control: Indian National Congress (36/60)
- 10 Sessions with 188 sitting days

The First Orissa Provincial Assembly was convened after the 1937 Indian provincial elections.

== House Composition ==
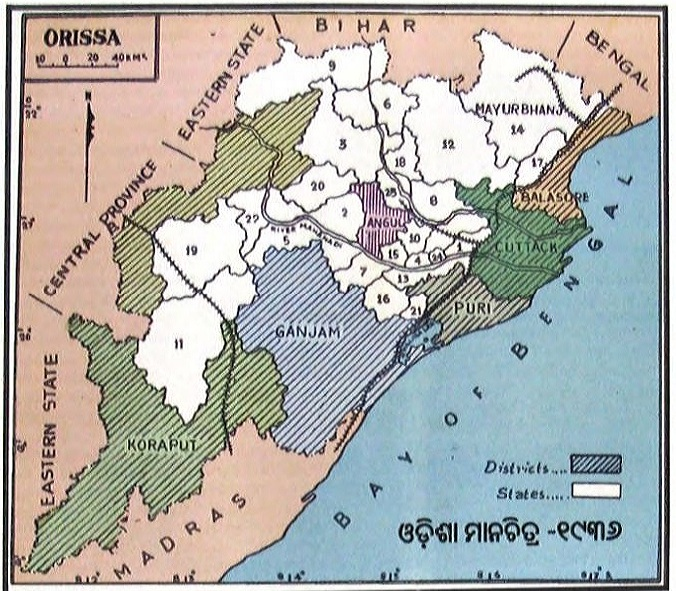
Orissa Province

Party	Strength
Indian National Congress	36
United Party	6
National Party	4
No Party Affiliation	4
Nominated	4
Independent	6

== Office Bearers ==
Post	Portrait	Name	Tenure		Party
Governor		Sir John Austen Hubback	Assembly Begins	11 August 1938	N/A
Governor		George Townsend Boag (Acting)	11 August 1938	7 December 1938	N/A
Governor		Sir John Austen Hubback	8 December 1938	31 March 1941	N/A
Governor		Sir Hawthorne Lewis	1 April 1941	Assembly Dissolves	N/A
Speaker		Mukunda Prasad Das; Member from Central Balasore Sadar	28 July 1937	29 May 1946	Indian National Congress
Deputy Speaker		Nanda Kishore Das; Member from South Balasore Sadar	28 July 1937	14 September 1945	Indian National Congress
Prime Minister		Krushna Chandra Gajapati; Member from Parlakimedi	1 April 1937	19 July 1937	National Party
Prime Minister		Bishwanath Das; Member from Ghumsur	19 July 1937	6 November 1939	Indian National Congress
Prime Minister		Krushna Chandra Gajapati; Member from Paralakimedi	24 November 1941	30 June 1944	National Party

== Council of Ministers ==
=== First Krushna Chandra Gajapati ministry (1937) ===
First Krushna Chandra Gajapati Ministry
Portfolio	Portrait	Minister	Constituency	Took office	Left office	Party
Prime Minister; Home Affairs; Finance; Law; Commerce		Krushna Chandra Gajapati	Paralakimedi	1 April 1937	19 July 1937	National Party
Revenue; Education		Mandhata Gorachand Patnaik	Chatrapur	1 April 1937	19 July 1937	National Party
Health; Local Self-Government; Public Works		Latifur Rahman	South Orissa (M)	1 April 1937	19 July 1937	National Party

=== First Bishwanath Das ministry (1937–1939) ===
First Bishwanath Das Ministry
Portfolio	Portrait	Minister	Constituency	Took office	Left office	Party
Cabinet Ministers
Prime Minister; Finance		Bishwanath Das	Ghumsur	19 July 1937	6 November 1939	INC
Home Affairs; Education		Bishwanath Das	Ghumsur	10 September 1937	6 November 1939	INC
Revenue; Public Works		Nityanand Kanungo	South Cuttack Sadar	19 July 1937	6 November 1939	INC
Home Affairs		Nityanand Kanungo	South Cuttack Sadar	10 September 1937	6 November 1939	INC
Law; Commerce; Health; Local Self-Government		Bodhram Dubey	Sambalpur Sadar	19 July 1937	6 November 1939	INC
Education		Bodhram Dubey	Sambalpur Sadar	10 September 1937	6 November 1939	INC
Parliamentary Secretaries
Parliamentary Secretary		Jadumani Mangaraj	Central Kendrapara	19 July 1937	6 November 1939	INC
Parliamentary Secretary		Jagannath Mishra	North Puri Sadar	19 July 1937	6 November 1939	INC
Parliamentary Secretary		Raj Krushna Bose	West Cuttack Sadar	19 July 1937	6 November 1939	INC
Parliamentary Secretary		Radhakrishna Biswasray	Koraput	19 July 1937	6 November 1939	INC

=== Second Krushna Chandra Gajapati ministry (1941–1944) ===
Second Krushna Chandra Gajapati Ministry
Portfolio	Portrait	Minister	Constituency	Took office	Left office	Party
Prime Minister; Home Affairs (except Publicity); Local Self-Government; Public Works		Krushna Chandra Gajapati	Paralakimedi	24 November 1941	29 June 1944	National Party
Finance; Home Affairs (Publicity); Development; Education		Godabarish Misra	West Khurda	24 November 1941	29 June 1944	Independent
Law; Commerce; Revenue; Health		Abdus Sobhan Khan	Balasore Cum Sambalpur (M)	24 November 1941	29 June 1944	Independent

== Members of Provincial Assembly ==
Member of Assembly
District	Constituency			Elected Candidate	Party
District	No.	Name	Type	Elected Candidate	Party
Balasore District	1	Balasore North	General	Charu Chandra Roy Mahasaya	Indian National Congress
Balasore District	2	Balasore Sadr Central	General	Mukunda Prasad Das	Indian National Congress
Balasore District	3	Balasore South	General	Nanda Kishore Das	Indian National Congress
Balasore District	4	Bhadrak East	General	Chakradhar Behera	Indian National Congress
Balasore District	5	Bhadrak West	General	Jagannath Das	Indian National Congress
Balasore District	6	Bhadrak West	General (reserved for Scheduled Caste)	Nidhi Das	Indian National Congress
Cuttack District	7	Jajpur North	General	Sadhu Charan Das	Indian National Congress
Cuttack District	8	Jajpur East	General	Bira Kishore Behera	Indian National Congress
Cuttack District	9	Jajpur East	General (reserved for Scheduled Caste)	Dwarakanath Das	Indian National Congress
Cuttack District	10	Jajpur West	General	Birabar Narayan Chandra Dhir Narendra	United Party
Cuttack District	11	Kendrapara North	General	Govinda Prasad Singh	Independent
Cuttack District	11	Kendrapara North	General	Brajanath Mishra (by election)	Indian National Congress
Cuttack District	12	Kendrapara Central	General	Jadumani Mangaraj	Indian National Congress
Cuttack District	13	Kendrapara East	General	Lokanath Misra	Indian National Congress
Cuttack District	14	Cuttack Sadr North	General	Atal Behary Acharya	Indian National Congress
Cuttack District	15	Cuttack Sadr North	General (reserved for Scheduled Caste)	Kanai Samal	United Party
Cuttack District	16	Cuttack Sadr West	General	Raj Krushna Bose	Indian National Congress
Cuttack District	17	Cuttack Sadr Central	General	Bichitrananda Das	Indian National Congress
Cuttack District	18	Cuttack Sadr East	General	Nabakrushna Choudhury	Indian National Congress
Cuttack District	19	Cuttack Sadr South	General	Nityananda Kanungo	Indian National Congress
Cuttack District	20	Cuttack Sadr	Muhammadan	Khan Bahadur Sayad Ahmed Baksh	Independent
Cuttack District	21	Cuttack town	General Women	Sarla Devi	Indian National Congress
Cuttack District	22	Cuttack North-cum-Angul	Muhammadan	Sayad Fazle Haque	Independent
Cuttack District	23	Angul	General	Girija Bhusan Dutta Krupasindhu Bhukta (bye election)	Indian National Congress
Cuttack District	24	Balasore cum-Sambalpur	Muhammadan	Maulvi Abdus Sobhan Khan	Independent
Puri District	25	Khurda East	General	Prananath Patnaik	Indian National Congress
Puri District	26	Khurda West	General	Godabarish Misra	Indian National Congress
Puri District	27	Puri Sadr North	General	Jagannath Mishra	Indian National Congress
Puri District	28	Puri Sadr North	General (reserved for Scheduled Caste)	Bisi Behera	Indian National Congress
Puri District	29	Puri Sadr East	General	Mohan Das	Indian National Congress
Puri District	30	Puri Sadr South	General	Jagabandhu Singha	Indian National Congress
Ganjam District	31	Berhampur town	General Women	A. Lakshmi Bai	Indian National Congress
Ganjam District	32	Kodala	General	Raja Bahadur Sri Ramachandra Mardaraj Deo Garu	United Party
Ganjam District	33	Chhattrapur	General	Mandhata Gorachand Patnaik Mahasayo	National Party
Ganjam District	34	Aska-Suruda	General	Govind Padhan	Indian National Congress
Ganjam District	35	Aska-Suruda	General (reserved for Scheduled Caste)	Punia Naik	Indian National Congress
Ganjam District	36	Ghumsar	General	Bishwanath Das Ananda Chandra Rout (bye election)	Indian National Congress
Ganjam District	37	Berhampur	General	Dibakar Patnaik	Indian National Congress
Ganjam District	38	Berhampur	General	Rama Chandra Debo	No Party Affiliation
Ganjam District	39	Berhampur	General	Vysyaraju Kasi Biswanatham Raju	No Party Affiliation
Ganjam District	40	Baliguda-Khandamals	General	Govinda Chandra Thatraj Uma Charan Patnaik Bharat Bhoi	Independent
Ganjam District	41	Paralakhemundi	General	Krushna Chandra Gajapati	National Party
Ganjam District	42	South Orissa	Muhammadan	Maulavi Latifur Rahman	National Party
Koraput District	43	Koraput	General	Radhakrishna Biswasray	Indian National Congress
Koraput District	44	Jeypur-Malkangiri	General	Radhamohan Sahu Mahasoyo	Indian National Congress
Koraput District	45	Nawarangapur	General	Sadasiba Tripathy Mahasoyo	Indian National Congress
Sambalpur District	46	Khariar	General	Lal Artatrana Deo	United Party
Sambalpur District	47	Bargarh East	General	Phakir Behera	Indian National Congress
Sambalpur District	48	Bargarh East	General (reserved for Scheduled Caste)	Bisi Ganda	National Party
Sambalpur District	49	Bargarh West	General	Prahallad Rai Lath	Indian National Congress
Sambalpur District	50	Sambalpur Sadr	General	Bodharam Dube	Indian National Congress
Sambalpur District	51	Sambalpur Sadr	General (reserved for Scheduled Caste)	Nrupalal Singh	United Party
Special Interest	52	Orissa	Indian Christian	Premananda Mohanty	No Party Affiliation
Special Interest	53	Orissa	Commerce and Ind.	Rangalal Modi	Independent
Special Interest	54	East Orissa	Landholders	Raja Sir Rajendra Narayan Bhanja Deo Bahadur	United Party
Special Interest	54	East Orissa	Landholders	Braja Sundar Das (bye election)	National Party
Special Interest	55	West Orissa	Landholders	Raja Krishna Chandra Mansingh Harichandan Mardaraj Bhramarbar Rai	No Party Affiliation
Special Interest	56	Orissa	Labour	Pyari Sankar Ray	Indian National Congress
Special Interest	57	Ghumsar-Udayagiri, Ganjam District	Nominated	Rev. E.M. Evans	No Party Affiliation
Special Interest	58	Serongo, Ganjam District	Nominated	Haripani Jennah	No Party Affiliation
Special Interest	59	Agency Public Prosecutor Koraput	Nominated	M.R.R.Y. Arabolu Appalaswami Naidu	No Party Affiliation
Special Interest	60	Rayagada, District Koraput	Nominated	Radhamohan Panda	No Party Affiliation
