= Purnachandra Bidika =

Indian powerlifter (born 1957)

Personal information
- Full name: Purnachandra Bidika
- Nationality: India
- Born: April 4, 1957 (age 69) Rayagada, Odisha, India

Sport
- Country: India
- Sport: Powerlifting
- Event: 56kg-Powerlifting

Purnachandra Bidika (born 4 April 1957) is an Indian powerlifter from Odisha. He has won 4 gold medals in 2006-World Power Lifting Championship. Bidika hails from an Adivasi family of Rayagada, Odisha. The Chief Minister of Odisha has made a financial assistance of Rs.2 lakhs for his participation in international event.

== Achievements ==
| Year | Competition | Venue | Position | Notes |
Representing India
| 2005 | World Power Lifting Championship | South Africa | Silver | Four medals |
| 2005 | World Power Lifting Championship | Tokyo, Japan | Seventh Position | 70-kg group |
| 2006 | World Power Lifting Championship | Texas, United States | Gold | Four Gold Medals |
| 2010 | World Power Lifting Championship | Ulan Bator, Mongolia | Gold | One Gold Medal |

== Other awards and achievements ==
- Finished 3rd in 60-kg Master-II category of World power lifting championship held in Palmspring City in USA in 2008
- Won District level Weight lifting championship in 1985 which he continued to win for consecutive 7 times
- Won 52-kg Master Title at the National Arms Wrestling Championship in Bhilai
- Won 52-kg Master Title at the National Arms Wrestling Championship in U.P. in 2006
