= Malati Choudhury =

Indian civil rights activist (1904–1998)

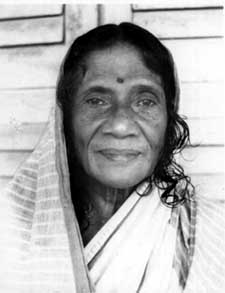
- Born: Malati Sen; 26 July 1904; Bihar, British India
- Died: 15 March 1998 (aged 93)
- Education: Santiniketan
- Spouse: Nabakrushna Choudhuri
- Parent(s): Barrister Kumud Nath Sen; Snehalata Sen
- Awards: Jamnalal Bajaj Award

Malati Devi Choudhury (née Sen) (26 July 1904 – 15 March 1998) was an Indian civil rights and freedom activist and Gandhian. She was born in 1904 in an upper middle class Brahmo family. She was the daughter of Barrister Kumud Nath Sen, whom she had lost when she was only two and a half years old, and Snehalata Sen, who brought her up.

== Early life and education ==
Malati's family originally belonged to Brahmin family of Kamarakhanda in Bikrampur, Dhaka, (now in Bangladesh), but her family members had settled in Simultala, Bihar. Her maternal grandfather was Behari Lal Gupta, ICS, who became the Dewan of Baroda. Her first cousins on her mother's side of the family were Ranajit Gupta, ICS, a former Chief Secretary of West Bengal, and Indrajit Gupta, the famous parliamentarian and former Home Minister of India. Her eldest brother, P. K. Sen Gupta, a former Income Tax Commissioner, belonged to the Indian Revenue Service, and another brother, K. P. Sen, a former Postmaster General, was from the Indian Postal Service. Being the youngest child of her parents, she was a darling of all her brothers and sister. Her mother Snehalata was a writer in her own right, and had translated some works of Tagore, as is seen from her book Jugalanjali.

Malati Choudhury adopted to a completely different life style once she joined Rabindranath Tagore's Vishva-Bharati. In an article entitled 'Reminiscences of Santiniketan', her mother had written: "Malati was very happy and benefited much from her residence at Viswa-Bharati as a student. The personal influence of Gurudev and his teachings, his patriotism and idealism, have influenced and guided Malati throughout her life."

Malati was deeply influenced by both Tagore and Mahatma Gandhi. It was the former at whose feet she learnt and acquired some rare values and principles of education, development, art and culture, which had been the guiding principles in her life; and it was the latter who cast a magic spell on her and at whose instance she plunged herself into the freedom struggle.

Malati came to Santiniketan in 1921, when she was only sixteen years old, and lived there for a little more than six years. In those days Santiniketan was small and beautiful. There were nine girls of her age living in the hostel called Notun Bari (New House). They were Manjushree, Surekha (who later on became her sister-in-law), Eva, Satyabati, Latika, Saraju, Tapasi, Amita (mother of Professor Amartya Sen) and herself. They attended classes in the open under trees, learnt embroidery, handicrafts, music, dancing, painting and gardening. Leonard Knight Elmhirst, an Englishman, was in charge of the Agricultural Institute at Surul in Sriniketan, and he used to encourage them to learn gardening. Mr. Pearson, another Englishman, also taught them. It was he who inspired Malati to work for the tribals. Gurudev used to take classes on Balaka, when he read poems from his book 'Balaka', and explained the significance of the poems to them. Miss Stella Kramisch, who came to India on Gurudev's invitation, taught them the principles of Indian Art and dancing. Malati and her friends spent very happy days at Santiniketan. As a young student there, she was quite famous for her outgoing personality, taking active part in Gurudev's dance dramas and music sessions, as well as being the source of innocent mischiefs in the community.

At this time, a young man, Nabakrushna Choudhuri, from a well known Zamindar family of Odisha, came to Santiniketan as a student. He came from Sabarmati Ashram at the instance of the Mahatma. He had as batchmates G. Ramachandran, B. Gopala Reddy, and Syed Mujtaba Ali. Malati got engaged to and later married Nabakrushna Choudhury, who later became the Chief Minister of Odisha and the two left Santiniketan in 1927.This proved to be a turning point in her life.

== Social work and politics ==
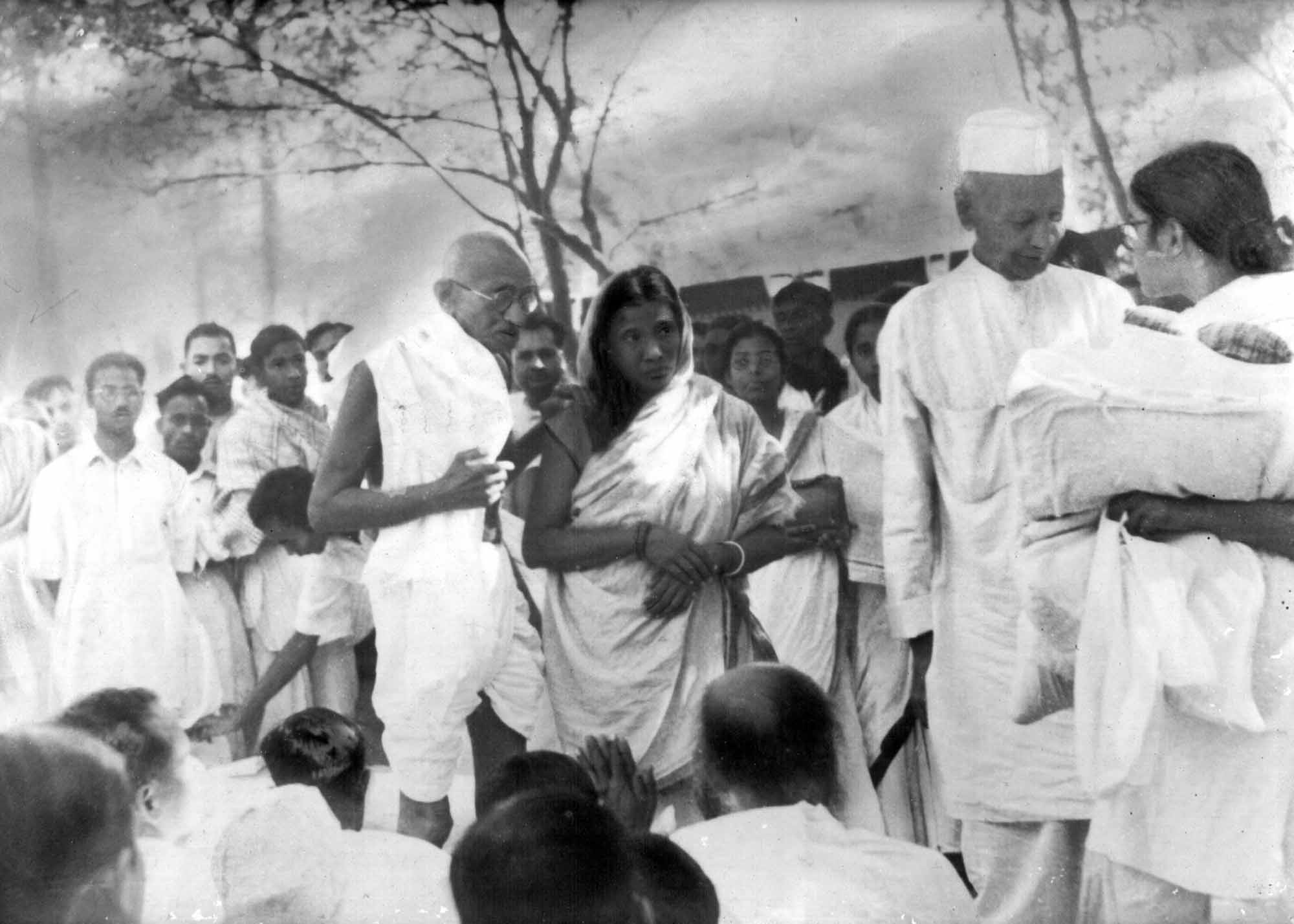
Gandhiji used to call her "Tofanee"

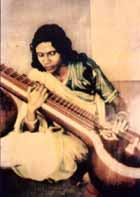
She was Tagore's favourite "Minu"

After her marriage, Orissa became her home and her area of activities. The Chaudhuris settled in a small village named Anakhia, now in Jagatsinghpur District of Orissa, where her husband started improved sugarcane cultivation. Apart from agriculture, establishing rapport with the surrounding villages was their main concern. In their concept and scheme of rural reconstruction, people are at the center of activities. Their development depended on their empowerment, which was again the result of education. They started adult education work in the neighbouring villages. Soon came the Salt Satyagraha, and they jumped into the movement. As activists they used principles of education and communication in creating a conducive environment for Satyagraha. Even as prisoners, they taught fellow prisoners, organized choral singing and disseminated Gandhiji's teachings.

In February 1933 the Chaudhuris organized the Utkal Congress Samajvadi Karmi Sangh, which later became the Orissa Provincial Branch of the All India Congress Socialist Party.

Proverbial courage, sheer dynamism and a strong zeal to fight for the rights of the oppressed and have-nots were the dominant features of her character. She was frank and outspoken, and was never afraid to speak up. In 1934, she had accompanied Gandhiji in his "padayatra" in Orissa. After a daylong walk, he was obviously too tired to visit a Harijan village which was in his itinerary. The villagers, who had waited long, were disappointed, but were prepared to forgive Gandhiji for the minor lapse. Malati Choudhury did not spare Gandhiji, and told him point blank, "Bapu, you have not done the right thing." Gandhiji apologized, and cooled her down with his disarming smile.

She was arrested several times (in 1921, 1936, 1942) with other women independence activists like Sarala Devi, Ramadevi Choudhury and others and was sent to jail

Even before Independence, she had established the Bajiraut Chhatravas at Angul in Orissa in 1946, and the Utkal Navajeevan Mandal, also at Angul, in 1948.

The Bajiraut Chhatravas had its genesis in the Prajamandal Movement (the resistance movement organized and sustained by the people) and its initial activities were geared towards providing residential facilities and educational opportunities to the children of the freedom fighters. Over the passage of time, there was a societal demand on the Bajiraut Chhatravas to provide educational facilities to children belonging to the "Scheduled Castes, Scheduled Tribes, Other Backward Classes" and under-privileged sections of the society coming from all over Orissa. Established in the memory of a twelve-year-old boy Bajiraut, who sacrificed his life by disallowing the British forces to cross Brahmani River by boat, the Bajiraut Chhatravas has become an institution of national importance.

The Utkal Navajeevan Mandal is a voluntary organization of repute, engaged in rural development and tribal welfare in the rural and tribal areas of Orissa. The State Resource Centre for Adult Education, which was established by the Government of India, under the auspices of the Utkal Navajeevan Mandal, at Angul in 1978, had done pioneering work in Adult Education.

She had organized the 'Krusaka Andolana' (Farmers Movement) as part of the freedom struggle against the zamindars and moneylenders, who exploited the poor. She had seen and experienced the untold sufferings of the people while walking through many villages in Orissa. She had also realized that women were victims of many superstitious beliefs, and they alone were to fight against superstitions for their own empowerment. As a member of the Constituent Assembly of India, she felt restless, because she was not in tune with the views of other members; when the Mahatma's famous Noakhali yatra began, she joined it at the instance of Thakkarbappa.

After independence, Malati Choudhury, as a member of the Constituent Assembly of India, and as the President of the Utkal Pradesh Congress Committee, tried her best to emphasize the role of education, especially adult education in rural reconstruction. When Nabakrushna Choudhuri became the Chief Minister of Orissa in 1951, she highlighted the plight of the have-nots, particularly those belonging to the Scheduled Castes and Scheduled Tribes. Eventually, she decided not to join politics, because Gandhiji had advised that all Congress activists need not join politics, but should work for and with the people with service as their goal.

A dynamic person like her did not slow down her efforts after the Bajiraut Chhatravas, Utkal Navajeevan Mandal and the Postbasic School at Champatimunda, near Angul, were established. She had joined the Bhoodan Movement of Acharya Vinoba Bhave. During the Emergency she raised her voice against the anti-people policy and oppressive measures adopted by the government and was imprisoned.

Malati Choudhury lived an eventful life and died at the age of ninety-three.

== Honours and awards ==
- National Award for Child Welfare (1987)
- Jamnalal Bajaj Award (1988)
- Utkal Seva Sammaan (1994)
- Tagore Literacy Award (1995)
- Honour by the Lok Sabha and Rajya Sabha on the occasion of the 50th Anniversary of the first sitting of the Constituent Assembly (1997)
- Honour by the State Social Welfare Advisory Board (1997)
- Honour by the Rajya Mahila Commission (1997)
- Deshikottama (D.Litt. Honoris Causa) from Viswa-Bharati
- In 1988, she refused to receive the prestigious Jamnalal Bajaj Award from the hands of the Prime Minister Rajiv Gandhi, because, according to her, Rajiv Gandhi had not done anything to promote Gandhian values.
