= Second Bishwanath Das ministry =

Government of Odisha (1971 – 1972)

- 13th Ministry of Orissa
- 1971 – 1972
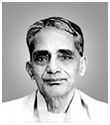
- Bishwanath Das; Hon'ble Chief Minister of Orissa
- Date formed: 3 April 1971
- Date dissolved: 14 June 1972

People and organisations
- Governor: Shaukatullah Shah Ansari; Jogendra Singh (acting)
- Chief Minister: Bishwanath Das
- No. of ministers: 26
- Member parties: Swatantra Party + Utkal Congress + Praja Socialist Party
- Status in legislature: Majority
- Opposition party: Indian National Congress (R)
- Opposition leader: Binayak Acharya

History
- Incoming formation: 5th Orissa Legislative Assembly
- Outgoing formation: 4th Orissa Legislative Assembly
- Election: 1971 Assembly election
- Legislature terms: 1 year, 72 days
- Predecessor: Rajendra Narayan Singh Deo ministry
- Successor: First Nandini Satpathy ministry

Bishwanath Das was sworn in for the second time as the chief minister of Orissa following a hung assembly verdict in 1971 Assembly election. After verdict of a hung assembly, Shri Bishwanath Das was chosen as a consensus candidate to led the coalition govt formed by Swatantra Party, Utkal Congress and Praja Socialist Party

== Brief history ==
After verdict of a hung assembly, Shri Bishwanath Das Das was chosen as a consensus candidate to led the coalition govt formed by Swatantra Party, Utkal Congress and Praja Socialist Party. Shri Das along with 13 Cabinet ministers and 12 Deputy Ministers were administered the oath of office and secrecy by Governor Shaukatullah Shah Ansari at the Raj Bhavan, Bhubaneswar on 3 April 1971. He wasn't the member of house as he didn't contest in 1971 election. Later, He contested and won the bypoll from Rourkela constituency.

With large number of defection of ruling coalition members to Indian National Congress (R), Shri Das resigned on 14 June 1972, barely ruling the state for over a year. On same day, Leader of Congress (R) Party, Smt. Nandini Satpathy was sworn in as the first female CM of the state.

== Council of Ministers ==
Source
Portfolio	Portrait	Name Constituency	Tenure		Party
Chief Minister; Finance; Planning & Coordination; Other departments not allocated to any Minister.		Bishwanath Das; MLA from Rourkela	3 April 1971	14 June 1972	Independent
Cabinet Minister
Political and Services (except River Valley Development); Tourism & Public Relations in Home; Industries		Rajendra Narayan Singh Deo; MLA from Bolangir	3 April 1971	14 June 1972	SWA
Home (except Tourism & Public Relations); Supply; State Public Corporation & Under-taking		Nilamani Routray; MLA from Basudebpur	3 April 1971	14 June 1972	Utkal Congress
Labour & Employment; Housing		Sidhalal Murmu; MLA from Rairangpur	3 April 1971	14 June 1972	All India Jharkhand Party
Excise; Commerce		Dayanidhi Naik; MLA from Bhawanipatna	3 April 1971	14 June 1972	SWA
Co-operation; Rural Development; Urban Development		Brundaban Nayak; MLA from Hinjili	3 April 1971	14 June 1972	Utkal Congress
Animal Husbandry		Gangadhar Pradhan; MLA from Talsara	3 April 1971	14 June 1972	SWA
Irrigation & Power (except Lift Irrigation); River Valley Development in Political and Services		Prahlad Mallik; MLA from Patamundai	3 April 1971	14 June 1972	Utkal Congress
Agriculture; Community Development & Panchayati Raj		Ananta Narayan Singh Deo; MLA from Suruda	3 April 1971	14 June 1972	SWA
Revenue; Lift Irrigation in Irrigation & Power		Pratap Chandra Mohanty; MLA from Tirtol	3 April 1971	14 June 1972	Utkal Congress
Forest; Works		Ainthu Sahoo; MLA from Patnagarh	3 April 1971	14 June 1972	SWA
Education; Culture		Sarat Kumar Kar; MLA from Mahanga	3 April 1971	14 June 1972	Utkal Congress
Law; Tribal & Rural Welfare		Natabara Pradhan; MLA from Baudh	3 April 1971	14 June 1972	SWA
Health & Family Planning		Ram Krushna Patnaik; MLA from Kodala	3 April 1971	14 June 1972	Utkal Congress
Deputy Minister
Agriculture; Co-operation; Transport		Damburu Majhi; MLA from Dabugam	3 April 1971	14 June 1972	SWA
Finance; Culture		Jadunath Das Mohapatra; MLA from Soro	3 April 1971	14 June 1972	Utkal Congress
Tribal & Rural Welfare; Tourism & Public Relations in Home		Ghasiram Majhi; MLA from Nawapara	3 April 1971	14 June 1972	SWA
Irrigation & Power (except Lift Irrigation)		Birabhadra Singh; MLA from Khunta	3 April 1971	14 June 1972	Utkal Congress
Industries; Planning & Coordination		Bhanuganga Tribhuban Deb; MLA from Bhanjanagar	3 April 1971	14 June 1972	SWA
Rural Development; Urban Development; Mines & Geology		Saharai Oram; MLA from Champua	3 April 1971	14 June 1972	Utkal Congress
Commerce; Animal Husbandry		Prafulla Kumar Das; MLA from Karanjia	3 April 1971	14 June 1972	SWA
Home (except Tourism & Public Relations); Supply; State Public Corporation & Under-taking		Debaraja Sahu; MLA from Angul	3 April 1971	14 June 1972	Utkal Congress
Works; Excise		Sarat Kumar Deb; MLA from Aul	3 April 1971	14 June 1972	SWA
Revenue; Lift Irrigation in Irrigation & Power		Gobinda Chandra Sethi; MLA from Nimapara	3 April 1971	14 June 1972	Utkal Congress
Community Development & Panchayati Raj		Ramachandra Praharaj; MLA from Banpur	3 April 1971	14 June 1972	SWA
Health & Family Planning		Rabi Singh Majhi; MLA from Umerkote	3 April 1971	14 June 1972	Utkal Congress

== Demographics ==
Division	District	Ministers	Cabinet Ministers	Deputy Ministers
Central	Cuttack	4	Prahlad Mallik; Pratap Chandra Mohanty; Sarat Kumar Kar	Sarat Kumar Deb
Central	Puri	2	–	Gobinda Chandra Sethi; Ramachandra Praharaj
Central	Balasore	2	Nilamani Routray	Jadunath Das Mohapatra
Central	Mayurbhanj	3	Sidhalal Murmu	Birabhadra Singh; Prafulla Kumar Das
Northern	Sambalpur	0	–	–
Northern	Sundergarh	2	Bishwanath Das (Chief Minister); Gangadhar Pradhan	–
Northern	Keonjhar	1	–	Saharai Oram
Northern	Dhenkanal	1	–	Debaraja Sahu
Northern	Balangir	2	Rajendra Narayan Singh Deo; Ainthu Sahoo	–
Southern	Ganjam	4	Brundaban Nayak; Ananta Narayan Singh Deo; Ram Krushna Patnaik	Bhanuganga Tribhuban Deb
Southern	Kalahandi	2	Dayanidhi Naik	Ghasiram Majhi
Southern	Koraput	2	–	Damburu Majhi; Rabi Singh Majhi
Southern	Phulbani	1	Natabara Pradhan	–
