= Hauswirth =

Hauswirth is a German Swiss surname, German Hauswirt means landlord. Notable people with the surname include:

- Christian Hauswirth (born 1965), Swiss ski jumper
- Frieda Hauswirth (1886–1974), Swiss artist and writer
- Luke Hauswirth (born 1995), American soccer player
- Sabine Hauswirth (born 1987), Swiss orienteering competitor
