= Angul Lok Sabha constituency =

Angul was a Lok Sabha constituency in Orissa state in eastern India till 2008. In 1971, the total number of electoral in the Angul constituency was 529706.

== Members of Parliament ==
Year	Member	Party
1952: Constituency does not exist
1957	Badakumar Pratap Gangadeb	GP
1962	Harekrushna Mahatab	Congress
1967	D. N. Deb	Swatantra Party
1971	Badakumar Pratap Gangadeb	Congress
1977 Onwards: Constituency does not exist
