= Biren Mitra =

Indian politician (1917–1978)

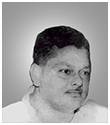

4th Chief Minister of Odisha
- In office 2 October 1963 – 21 February 1965
- Governor: A. N. Khosla
- Preceded by: Biju Patnaik
- Succeeded by: Sadashiva Tripathy

Deputy Chief Minister of Odisha
- In office 23 June 1961 – 2 October 1963
- Preceded by: Office established
- Succeeded by: Nilamani Routray

Member of the Odisha Legislative Assembly
- In office 20 February 1952 – 23 January 1971
- Constituency: Cuttack Town (1952–1957); Cuttack City (1957–1971)

Personal details
- Born: 26 November 1917 Cuttack, Bihar and Orissa Province, British India
- Died: 25 May 1978 (aged 60) Cuttack, Odisha, India
- Party: Indian National Congress; All India Students' Federation (Student wing)
- Spouse: Iswarama Mitra
- Children: 2 sons, 1 daughter
- Parent: Bipin Behari Mitra (father)
- Education: Bachelor of Arts (BA)
- Alma mater: Ravenshaw College, Cuttack
- Profession: Politician, Freedom fighter, Student leader

Biren Mitra (26 November 1917 – 25 May 1978) was an Indian politician, student activist, and freedom fighter who served as the 4th Chief Minister of Odisha from 2 October 1963 to 21 February 1965. A prominent leader of the Indian National Congress, he also served as the first Deputy Chief Minister of Odisha from 23 June 1961 to 2 October 1963 under the administration of Biju Patnaik.

Mitra was a formidable grassroots organiser who played a pivotal role in strengthening the Congress party's presence in coastal Odisha. He represented the Cuttack Town and Cuttack City constituencies in the Odisha Legislative Assembly for four consecutive terms, winning elections in 1952, 1957, 1961, and 1967. His political journey spanned from the student agitations of the pre-independence era to senior state craftsmanship during Odisha's post-colonial industrial expansion. His executive career culminated with his resignation in February 1965 following a period of intense student unrest across the state.

== Personal life ==
Mitra was born in a Karan family. He started his student politics with AISF (Communist Party of India students wing). The Biren Mitra Park located at Sector-11 of CDA in Cuttack has been named in his honour.

== Political career ==
=== Early political activism and entry into the Assembly (1930s–1950s) ===
Mitra began his political journey during his student days at Ravenshaw College in the 1930s as an active organiser for the All India Students' Federation (AISF). He subsequently joined the Indian National Congress and participated heavily in the anti-colonial struggle, which led to his imprisonment during the Quit India Movement in 1942. Following independence, Mitra focused on expanding the grassroots organizational network of the Congress party across coastal Odisha.

He contested the first state elections in 1952 and was elected as a Member of the Legislative Assembly (MLA) from the Cuttack Town constituency to the First Odisha Legislative Assembly. He successfully retained his seat from the newly configured Cuttack City constituency during the subsequent 1957 state legislative elections. During this initial decade in the assembly, Mitra did not join the state cabinet, serving instead as a key party strategist.

=== Deputy Chief Minister (1961–1963) ===
Following the 1961 midterm elections, the Congress party secured a decisive majority under the leadership of Biju Patnaik. Mitra, who won his third consecutive election from Cuttack City, was appointed as the Deputy Chief Minister of Odisha in Patnaik's cabinet on 23 June 1961.

As Deputy Chief Minister, Mitra was entrusted with several heavy governance responsibilities. He held the key portfolios of Political & Services, Law, Health (Local Self-Government), and Planning & Co-ordination. In his planning portfolio, he worked closely with Patnaik to design structural frameworks for rural decentralisation, community development projects, and the expansion of Gram Panchayats throughout the state.

=== Chief Minister of Odisha (1963–1965) ===
On 2 October 1963, Biju Patnaik resigned under the Kamaraj Plan to dedicate himself to party organizational work, and Mitra was chosen to succeed him, becoming the 4th Chief Minister of Odisha.

As Chief Minister, Mitra assumed direct, centralised control over the state's economic and resource machinery, managing the portfolios of Finance, Industries, Mining & Geology, Irrigation & Power, Commerce, Health, Cultural Affairs, and Planning & Co-ordination. His administration focused on expanding state-driven industrial infrastructure and advancing mining enterprises in western Odisha. However, his tenure was short-lived and faced severe challenges, most notably the historic 1964 Odisha student agitation, which caused widespread political instability across the state. Amid mounting political pressure and internal party shifts, Mitra resigned from the post on 21 February 1965 and was succeeded by Sadashiva Tripathy.

=== Later legislative years (1965–1971) ===
Following his resignation from the top executive post, Mitra withdrew from front-line ministerial governance but continued his legislative responsibilities as a regular member of the assembly. He served out the remaining term of the Third Assembly and went on to win a fourth consecutive legislative term from the Cuttack City constituency during the 1967 state elections. He remained a senior voice in the assembly until its eventual dissolution in January 1971, marking the conclusion of his career in the state legislature.

Preceded by Biju Patnaik	Chief minister of Odisha; 2 October 1963–21 February 1965	Succeeded by Sadashiva Tripathy
