= Harekrushna Mahtab State Library =

Library in Bhubaneswar, Odisha, India

- ହରେକୃଷ୍ଣ ମହତାବ ରାଜ୍ୟ ଗ୍ରନ୍ଥାଗାର
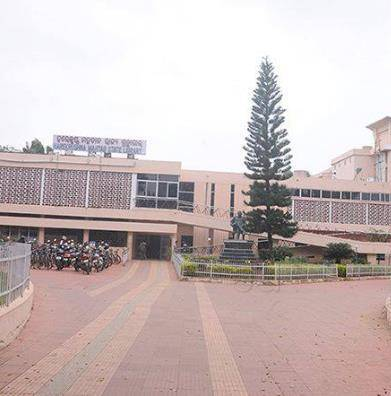
- 20.275666°N 85.833818°E
- Location: Bhubaneswar, Odisha, India
- Type: Public Library
- Established: 1959

Collection
- Items collected: Books, magazines, newspapers, journals, databases, maps, postage stamps, prints, drawings, manuscripts and media.
- Size: 217,640 books (2007)

Access and use
- Population served: 10,000(2017)

Other information
- Budget: ₹62,590(2007-08)
- Employees: 24
- Website: hkmsl.gov.in

The Harekrushna Mahtab State Library is a library in the city of Bhubaneswar, Odisha, India. This is situated on the Sachivalay Marg, next to State Secretariat. Completed in 1959, it houses the State Library of Odisha and the Public Library for the city of Bhubaneswar. As part of the birth centenary celebration of Mahatma Gandhi, it was named as "Gandhi Bhawan" in 1967 . In 1987, it was renamed after the first chief minister of Odisha Harekrushna Mahatab.

This library has been awarded as the Best State Library of India .
