= Lal Mohan Pati =

Indian politician

Member of the Constituent Assembly of India

Lal Mohan Pati was an Indian politician who was the Member of the Constituent Assembly of India representing Orissa constituency.

== Career ==
Pati became a Member of the Constituent Assembly of India from Orissa. (Note: The assembly was elected to frame the Constitution of India, and its members played a crucial role in defining the country's governance. Pati was said to have added to this legislative body. Odisha,) He contributed to Biswanath Das, Bichitrananda Das, and Harekrushna Mahatab.
