= Chief Minister of Odisha =

Head of government of Odisha, India

- ଓଡ଼ିଶାର ମୁଖ୍ୟମନ୍ତ୍ରୀ
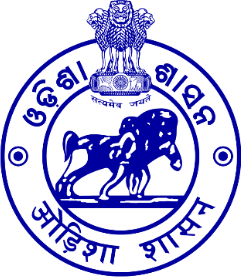
- Emblem of Odisha

- Flag of India

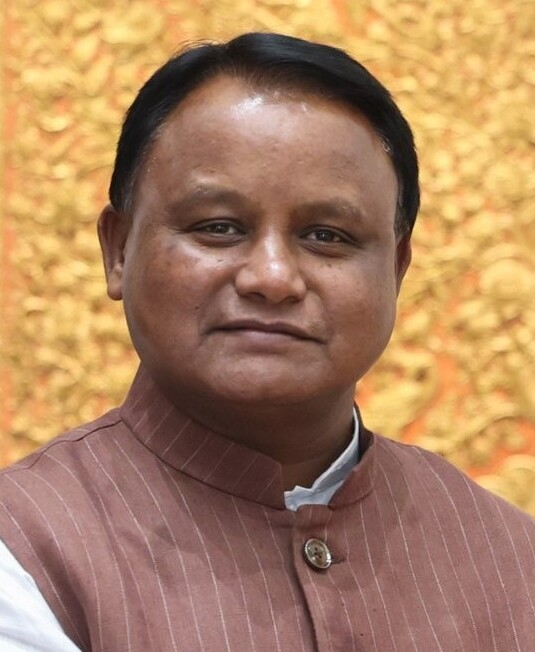
- Incumbent; Mohan Charan Majhi since 12 June 2024
- Chief Minister's Office; Government of Odisha
- Style: The Honourable
- Type: Head of government
- Status: Leader of the Executive
- Abbreviation: CM of Odisha
- Member of: Odisha Legislative Assembly; Odisha Council of Ministers
- Reports to: Governor of Odisha; Odisha Legislative Assembly
- Residence: Chief Minister's Official Residence, Raj Bhavan Marg, Bhubaneswar
- Seat: Lok Seva Bhavan, Bhubaneswar
- Nominator: Members of the majority party or coalition in the Legislative Assembly
- Appointer: Governor of Odisha; by convention, based on the appointee's ability to command confidence in the Odisha Legislative Assembly
- Term length: At the confidence of the assembly; five years (no term limits)
- Precursor: Prime Minister of Orissa
- Inaugural holder: Krushna Chandra Gajapati (as Prime Minister); Harekrushna Mahatab (as Chief Minister)
- Formation: 1 April 1937 (89 years ago) (as Prime Minister); 26 January 1950 (76 years ago) (as Chief Minister)
- Deputy: Deputy Chief Minister of Odisha; Incumbents: Kanak Vardhan Singh Deo & Pravati Parida
- Salary: ₹98,000 (US$1,000) monthly; ₹1,176,000 (US$12,000) annually
- Website: cm.odisha.gov.in

The chief minister of Odisha is the head of government of the Indian state of Odisha. Under the Constitution of India, the governor is the state's de jure head, while de facto executive authority rests with the chief minister. Following elections to the Odisha Legislative Assembly, the governor invites the party or coalition with a majority of seats to form the state government. The governor appoints the chief minister, whose council of ministers is collectively responsible to the assembly. Subject to the confidence of the assembly, the chief minister's term is for five years and carries no term limits. By convention and under the rules of procedure of the house, the chief minister also serves as the Leader of the House in the Legislative Assembly.

== History ==
Orissa Province was constituted as a separate province of British India on 1 April 1936. Following the 1937 Indian provincial elections held under the Government of India Act 1935, the first provincial government was formed on 1 April 1937 with Krushna Chandra Gajapati as Prime Minister. He headed a minority ministry until July 1937, when Indian National Congress leader Bishwanath Das took office as Prime Minister. The Congress ministry resigned in November 1939 in protest against India's inclusion in the Second World War without legislative consultation. After a period of direct Governor's rule, Gajapati returned to lead a coalition ministry from November 1941 until June 1944. Following the 1946 Indian provincial elections, Congress leader Harekrushna Mahatab assumed office as Prime Minister in April 1946, serving through Indian independence in August 1947.

Upon the commencement of the Constitution of India on 26 January 1950, the provincial office of Prime Minister was redesignated as Chief Minister. Mahatab continued as the state's first Chief Minister until May 1950, when he resigned to join the Union Cabinet and was succeeded by Nabakrushna Choudhuri. Choudhuri subsequently led the Congress to victory in the first legislative assembly election in 1952.

Since 1950, 15 individuals have served as the Chief Minister of Odisha. Naveen Patnaik of the Biju Janata Dal, who held the office for five consecutive terms from March 2000 to June 2024, is the longest-serving chief minister in the state's history. The incumbent chief minister is Mohan Charan Majhi of the Bharatiya Janata Party, who took office on 12 June 2024.

== List of prime ministers ==
Parties

National Party (2) Indian National Congress (2)

No.	Portrait	Name (Birth–Death) Constituency	Term of office Electoral mandates Time in office		Other ministerial offices held while Prime Minister	Political party of PM	Government		Appointer (Governor)	Refs
1		Krushna Chandra Gajapati (1892–1974); Paralakhemundi	1 April 1937	19 July 1937	Home Affairs; Finance; Law; Commerce	National Party	Gajapati I	1st Provincial	Sir John Austen Hubback	
1		Krushna Chandra Gajapati (1892–1974); Paralakhemundi	1937		Home Affairs; Finance; Law; Commerce	National Party	Gajapati I	1st Provincial	Sir John Austen Hubback	
1		Krushna Chandra Gajapati (1892–1974); Paralakhemundi	3 months and 18 days		Home Affairs; Finance; Law; Commerce	National Party	Gajapati I	1st Provincial	Sir John Austen Hubback	
1		Krushna Chandra Gajapati (1892–1974); Paralakhemundi	Gajapati formed an interim minority ministry on 1 April 1937 after the Congress declined to take office over disputes regarding the Governor's special powers. He resigned on 19 July 1937 once the Congress agreed to form the administration.						Sir John Austen Hubback	
2		Bishwanath Das (1889–1984); Ghumsur	19 July 1937	6 November 1939	Finance; Home Affairs; Education	Indian National Congress	Das I	1st Provincial	Sir John Austen Hubback	
2		Bishwanath Das (1889–1984); Ghumsur	1937		Finance; Home Affairs; Education	Indian National Congress	Das I	1st Provincial	Sir John Austen Hubback	
2		Bishwanath Das (1889–1984); Ghumsur	2 years, 3 months and 18 days		Finance; Home Affairs; Education	Indian National Congress	Das I	1st Provincial	Sir John Austen Hubback	
2		Bishwanath Das (1889–1984); Ghumsur	Das led the first Congress ministry in the province. The ministry resigned in November 1939 alongside other provincial Congress ministries across British India after the Viceroy declared India a belligerent in World War II without consulting provincial legislatures.						Sir John Austen Hubback	
(1)		Krushna Chandra Gajapati (1892–1974); Paralakhemundi	24 November 1941	30 June 1944	Home Affairs (except Publicity); Local Self-Government; Public Works	National Party	Gajapati II	1st Provincial	Sir Hawthorne Lewis	
(1)		Krushna Chandra Gajapati (1892–1974); Paralakhemundi	—		Home Affairs (except Publicity); Local Self-Government; Public Works	National Party	Gajapati II	1st Provincial	Sir Hawthorne Lewis	
(1)		Krushna Chandra Gajapati (1892–1974); Paralakhemundi	2 years, 7 months and 6 days		Home Affairs (except Publicity); Local Self-Government; Public Works	National Party	Gajapati II	1st Provincial	Sir Hawthorne Lewis	
(1)		Krushna Chandra Gajapati (1892–1974); Paralakhemundi	Gajapati formed a coalition government with dissident Congress members and the Muslim League following two years of direct Governor's rule. His administration established Utkal University in 1943. He resigned in June 1944 due to disagreements within the coalition.						Sir Hawthorne Lewis	
3		Harekrushna Mahatab (1899–1987); East Bhadrak	23 April 1946	26 January 1950	Home; Finance; Planning & Reconstruction	Indian National Congress	Mahatab I	2nd Provincial	Chandulal Trivedi	
3		Harekrushna Mahatab (1899–1987); East Bhadrak	1946		Home; Finance; Planning & Reconstruction	Indian National Congress	Mahatab I	2nd Provincial	Chandulal Trivedi	
3		Harekrushna Mahatab (1899–1987); East Bhadrak	3 years, 9 months and 3 days		Home; Finance; Planning & Reconstruction	Indian National Congress	Mahatab I	2nd Provincial	Chandulal Trivedi	
3		Harekrushna Mahatab (1899–1987); East Bhadrak	Mahatab formed the ministry after Congress won the 1946 elections, serving through the transfer of power in August 1947. He negotiated the merger of 24 princely states into the province between 1947 and 1949. On 26 January 1950, when the Constitution of India took effect, the title of the head of government changed from Prime Minister to Chief Minister.						Chandulal Trivedi	

== List of chief ministers ==
Parties

Indian National Congress
Indian National Congress (R)
Swatantra Party
Independent
Janata Party
Janata Dal
Biju Janata Dal
Bharatiya Janata Party

No.	Portrait	Name (Birth–Death) Constituency	Term of office Electoral mandates Time in office		Other ministerial offices held while Chief Minister	Political party	Government		Appointer (Governor)	Refs
1		Harekrushna Mahatab (1899–1987); East Bhadrak	26 January 1950	12 May 1950	—	Indian National Congress	Mahatab I	2nd Provincial	Chandulal Trivedi	
1		Harekrushna Mahatab (1899–1987); East Bhadrak	1946		—	Indian National Congress	Mahatab I	2nd Provincial	Chandulal Trivedi	
1		Harekrushna Mahatab (1899–1987); East Bhadrak	3 months and 16 days		—	Indian National Congress	Mahatab I	2nd Provincial	Chandulal Trivedi	
1		Harekrushna Mahatab (1899–1987); East Bhadrak	Assumed office as the first Chief Minister of Odisha following the commencement of the Constitution of India, having previously served as Prime Minister of Orissa since 1946. Oversaw the integration of former princely states, initial construction of the Hirakud Dam, and the establishment of Bhubaneswar as the state capital. Resigned after appointment to the Union Cabinet as Minister of Commerce and Industry.						Chandulal Trivedi	
2		Nabakrushna Choudhuri (1901–1984); North Kendrapara	12 May 1950	20 February 1952	—	Indian National Congress	Choudhuri I	2nd Provincial	Asaf Ali	
2		Nabakrushna Choudhuri (1901–1984); North Kendrapara	—		—	Indian National Congress	Choudhuri I	2nd Provincial	Asaf Ali	
2		Nabakrushna Choudhuri (1901–1984); North Kendrapara	1 year, 9 months and 8 days		—	Indian National Congress	Choudhuri I	2nd Provincial	Asaf Ali	
2		Nabakrushna Choudhuri (1901–1984); North Kendrapara	Appointed by the Congress Legislature Party to succeed Mahatab. Initiated land reform measures, including the introduction and passage of the Orissa Estates Abolition Act of 1951 to dismantle the zamindari tenure system.						Asaf Ali	
2		Nabakrushna Choudhuri (1901–1984); Barchana	20 February 1952	19 October 1956	—	Indian National Congress	Choudhuri II	1st	Asaf Ali	
2		Nabakrushna Choudhuri (1901–1984); Barchana	1952		—	Indian National Congress	Choudhuri II	1st	Asaf Ali	
2		Nabakrushna Choudhuri (1901–1984); Barchana	4 years, 7 months and 29 days		—	Indian National Congress	Choudhuri II	1st	Asaf Ali	
2		Nabakrushna Choudhuri (1901–1984); Barchana	Formed the ministry after the Congress secured a plurality in the 1952 general elections. Enacted the Orissa Official Language Act of 1954, making Odia the state's official language, and passed the Orissa Tenants Relief Act. Resigned in October 1956 following demonstrations regarding the boundary decisions of the States Reorganisation Commission.						Asaf Ali	
(1)		Harekrushna Mahatab (1899–1987); Not Contested	19 October 1956	5 April 1957	—	Indian National Congress	Mahatab II	1st	Bhim Sen Sachar	
(1)		Harekrushna Mahatab (1899–1987); Not Contested	—		—	Indian National Congress	Mahatab II	1st	Bhim Sen Sachar	
(1)		Harekrushna Mahatab (1899–1987); Not Contested	5 months and 17 days		—	Indian National Congress	Mahatab II	1st	Bhim Sen Sachar	
(1)		Harekrushna Mahatab (1899–1987); Not Contested	Returned to the Chief Ministership following Choudhuri's resignation, stepping down as Governor of Bombay. Maintained administrative continuity after boundary-related demonstrations and oversaw the inauguration of the Hirakud Dam in January 1957 prior to the second general elections.						Bhim Sen Sachar	
(1)		Harekrushna Mahatab (1899–1987); Soro	6 April 1957	25 February 1961	—	Indian National Congress	Mahatab III	2nd	Bhim Sen Sachar	
(1)		Harekrushna Mahatab (1899–1987); Soro	1957		—	Indian National Congress	Mahatab III	2nd	Bhim Sen Sachar	
(1)		Harekrushna Mahatab (1899–1987); Soro	3 years, 10 months and 19 days		—	Indian National Congress	Mahatab III	2nd	Bhim Sen Sachar	
(1)		Harekrushna Mahatab (1899–1987); Soro	Headed a minority administration following an inconclusive election, later forming a coalition with the All India Ganatantra Parishad in May 1959. Resigned in February 1961 due to internal opposition within the state Congress party against the coalition, resulting in the assembly's dissolution and the imposition of President's rule.						Bhim Sen Sachar	
—	State Emblem of India	Vacant (President's rule)	25 February 1961	23 June 1961	Not applicable	N/A	N/A	Dissolved	N/A	
—	State Emblem of India	Vacant (President's rule)	—		Not applicable	N/A	N/A	Dissolved	N/A	
—	State Emblem of India	Vacant (President's rule)	3 months and 29 days		Not applicable	N/A	N/A	Dissolved	N/A	
—	State Emblem of India	Vacant (President's rule)	President's rule was declared under Article 356 following the collapse of the Congress–Ganatantra Parishad coalition, continuing until mid-term elections in June 1961.						N/A	
3		Biju Patnaik (1916–1997); Choudwar	23 June 1961	2 October 1963	—	Indian National Congress	Biju I	3rd	Yashwant Narayan Sukthankar	
3		Biju Patnaik (1916–1997); Choudwar	1961		—	Indian National Congress	Biju I	3rd	Yashwant Narayan Sukthankar	
3		Biju Patnaik (1916–1997); Choudwar	2 years, 3 months and 9 days		—	Indian National Congress	Biju I	3rd	Yashwant Narayan Sukthankar	
3		Biju Patnaik (1916–1997); Choudwar	Took office after the Congress won 82 seats in the 1961 mid-term elections. Initiated major industrial and infrastructure projects, including Paradip Port, the Balimela hydro-electric project, the Express Highway, and the Regional Engineering College at Rourkela. Resigned voluntarily under the Kamaraj Plan to conduct organizational work for the party.						Yashwant Narayan Sukthankar	
4		Biren Mitra (1917–1978); Cuttack City	2 October 1963	21 February 1965	—	Indian National Congress	Mitra	3rd	Ajudhia Nath Khosla	
4		Biren Mitra (1917–1978); Cuttack City	—		—	Indian National Congress	Mitra	3rd	Ajudhia Nath Khosla	
4		Biren Mitra (1917–1978); Cuttack City	1 year, 4 months and 19 days		—	Indian National Congress	Mitra	3rd	Ajudhia Nath Khosla	
4		Biren Mitra (1917–1978); Cuttack City	Succeeded Patnaik as leader of the Congress Legislature Party. Continued development on Paradip Port while managing statewide student demonstrations in 1964 and administrative inquiries into government transactions. Resigned in February 1965 following the completion of an inquiry by the Central Bureau of Investigation.						Ajudhia Nath Khosla	
5		Sadashiva Tripathy (1910–1980); Umerkote	21 February 1965	8 March 1967	—	Indian National Congress	Tripathy	3rd	Ajudhia Nath Khosla	
5		Sadashiva Tripathy (1910–1980); Umerkote	—		—	Indian National Congress	Tripathy	3rd	Ajudhia Nath Khosla	
5		Sadashiva Tripathy (1910–1980); Umerkote	2 years and 15 days		—	Indian National Congress	Tripathy	3rd	Ajudhia Nath Khosla	
5		Sadashiva Tripathy (1910–1980); Umerkote	Elected to succeed Mitra as Chief Minister. Continued implementation of the Orissa Land Reforms Act and coordinated administrative relief efforts during drought conditions in southern and western districts in 1966. Completed the assembly term before the general elections of 1967.						Ajudhia Nath Khosla	
6		Rajendra Narayan Singh Deo (1912–1975); Bolangir	8 March 1967	9 January 1971	—	Swatantra Party	Singh Deo	4th	Ajudhia Nath Khosla	
6		Rajendra Narayan Singh Deo (1912–1975); Bolangir	1967		—	Swatantra Party	Singh Deo	4th	Ajudhia Nath Khosla	
6		Rajendra Narayan Singh Deo (1912–1975); Bolangir	3 years, 10 months and 1 day		—	Swatantra Party	Singh Deo	4th	Ajudhia Nath Khosla	
6		Rajendra Narayan Singh Deo (1912–1975); Bolangir	Formed the state's first non-Congress ministry, leading a coalition of the Swatantra Party and the Orissa Jana Congress. Established the Mudholkar Commission to examine administrative allegations concerning prior governments and set up the state Vigilance Commission. Resigned in January 1971 after the Jana Congress withdrew support.						Ajudhia Nath Khosla	
—	State Emblem of India	Vacant (President's rule)	9 January 1971	3 April 1971	Not applicable	N/A	N/A	Dissolved	N/A	
—	State Emblem of India	Vacant (President's rule)	—		Not applicable	N/A	N/A	Dissolved	N/A	
—	State Emblem of India	Vacant (President's rule)	2 months and 25 days		Not applicable	N/A	N/A	Dissolved	N/A	
—	State Emblem of India	Vacant (President's rule)	President's rule was declared upon the dissolution of the Fourth Assembly, remaining in place until mid-term elections in March 1971.						N/A	
7		Bishwanath Das (1889–1984); Rourkela	3 April 1971	14 June 1972	—	Independent	Das II	5th	Shaukatullah Shah Ansari	
7		Bishwanath Das (1889–1984); Rourkela	1971		—	Independent	Das II	5th	Shaukatullah Shah Ansari	
7		Bishwanath Das (1889–1984); Rourkela	1 year, 2 months and 11 days		—	Independent	Das II	5th	Shaukatullah Shah Ansari	
7		Bishwanath Das (1889–1984); Rourkela	Headed a United Front coalition government consisting of the Utkal Congress, Swatantra Party, and Jharkhand Party, later winning a by-election from Rourkela. Resigned in June 1972 after a substantial section of coalition legislators joined the Congress (R).						Shaukatullah Shah Ansari	
8		Nandini Satpathy (1931–2006); Cuttack City	14 June 1972	3 March 1973	—	Indian National Congress (R)	Satpathy I	5th	Jogendra Singh	
8		Nandini Satpathy (1931–2006); Cuttack City	—		—	Indian National Congress (R)	Satpathy I	5th	Jogendra Singh	
8		Nandini Satpathy (1931–2006); Cuttack City	8 months and 17 days		—	Indian National Congress (R)	Satpathy I	5th	Jogendra Singh	
8		Nandini Satpathy (1931–2006); Cuttack City	Formed a ministry following the collapse of the United Front government, subsequently winning a by-election from Cuttack City. Introduced statutory amendments reducing land ceiling limits under land-reform laws. Resigned in March 1973 when floor-crossings reduced the government's legislative strength.						Jogendra Singh	
—	State Emblem of India	Vacant (President's rule)	3 March 1973	6 March 1974	Not applicable	N/A	N/A	Dissolved	N/A	
—	State Emblem of India	Vacant (President's rule)	—		Not applicable	N/A	N/A	Dissolved	N/A	
—	State Emblem of India	Vacant (President's rule)	1 year and 3 days		Not applicable	N/A	N/A	Dissolved	N/A	
—	State Emblem of India	Vacant (President's rule)	President's rule remained in effect for twelve months following the fall of the first Satpathy ministry until elections in February 1974.						N/A	
(8)		Nandini Satpathy (1931–2006); Dhenkanal	6 March 1974	16 December 1976	—	Indian National Congress (R)	Satpathy II	6th	Basappa Danappa Jatti	
(8)		Nandini Satpathy (1931–2006); Dhenkanal	1974		—	Indian National Congress (R)	Satpathy II	6th	Basappa Danappa Jatti	
(8)		Nandini Satpathy (1931–2006); Dhenkanal	2 years, 9 months and 10 days		—	Indian National Congress (R)	Satpathy II	6th	Basappa Danappa Jatti	
(8)		Nandini Satpathy (1931–2006); Dhenkanal	Formed a ministry following the 1974 elections with legislative support from the Communist Party of India. Administered state programs during the national Emergency declared in June 1975, executing rural debt-relief legislation and land distribution measures. Resigned in December 1976 amid leadership disputes within the party.						Basappa Danappa Jatti	
—	State Emblem of India	Vacant (President's rule)	16 December 1976	29 December 1976	Not applicable	N/A	N/A	6th	N/A	
—	State Emblem of India	Vacant (President's rule)	—		Not applicable	N/A	N/A	6th	N/A	
—	State Emblem of India	Vacant (President's rule)	13 days		Not applicable	N/A	N/A	6th	N/A	
—	State Emblem of India	Vacant (President's rule)	Thirteen-day period of President's rule under a suspended assembly during ministerial reorganization within the ruling party.						N/A	
9		Binayak Acharya (1918–1983); Berhampur	29 December 1976	30 April 1977	—	Indian National Congress (R)	Acharya	6th	Siba Narain Sankar	
9		Binayak Acharya (1918–1983); Berhampur	—		—	Indian National Congress (R)	Acharya	6th	Siba Narain Sankar	
9		Binayak Acharya (1918–1983); Berhampur	4 months and 1 day		—	Indian National Congress (R)	Acharya	6th	Siba Narain Sankar	
9		Binayak Acharya (1918–1983); Berhampur	Succeeded Satpathy as Chief Minister during the late Emergency period. The ministry was dismissed under Article 356 in April 1977 when the central government dissolved nine state legislative assemblies following the 1977 parliamentary elections.						Siba Narain Sankar	
—	State Emblem of India	Vacant (President's rule)	30 April 1977	26 June 1977	Not applicable	N/A	N/A	Dissolved	N/A	
—	State Emblem of India	Vacant (President's rule)	—		Not applicable	N/A	N/A	Dissolved	N/A	
—	State Emblem of India	Vacant (President's rule)	1 month and 27 days		Not applicable	N/A	N/A	Dissolved	N/A	
—	State Emblem of India	Vacant (President's rule)	President's rule was declared upon the dissolution of the assembly pending fresh elections in June 1977.						N/A	
10		Nilamani Routray (1920–2004); Basudevpur	26 June 1977	17 February 1980	—	Janata Party	Routray	7th	Harcharan Singh Brar	
10		Nilamani Routray (1920–2004); Basudevpur	1977		—	Janata Party	Routray	7th	Harcharan Singh Brar	
10		Nilamani Routray (1920–2004); Basudevpur	2 years, 7 months and 22 days		—	Janata Party	Routray	7th	Harcharan Singh Brar	
10		Nilamani Routray (1920–2004); Basudevpur	Assumed office after the Janata Party secured 110 of 147 seats in the 1977 elections. Focused on administrative decentralization and organized statewide panchayat elections. The ministry was dismissed under Article 356 in February 1980 following the parliamentary change of government at the Centre.						Harcharan Singh Brar	
—	State Emblem of India	Vacant (President's rule)	17 February 1980	9 June 1980	Not applicable	N/A	N/A	Dissolved	N/A	
—	State Emblem of India	Vacant (President's rule)	—		Not applicable	N/A	N/A	Dissolved	N/A	
—	State Emblem of India	Vacant (President's rule)	3 months and 23 days		Not applicable	N/A	N/A	Dissolved	N/A	
—	State Emblem of India	Vacant (President's rule)	President's rule was enforced following the dissolution of the assembly, lasting until assembly elections in May 1980.						N/A	
11		Janaki Ballabh Patnaik (1927–2015); Athagarh	9 June 1980	10 March 1985	—	Indian National Congress	Janaki I	8th	C. M. Poonacha	
11		Janaki Ballabh Patnaik (1927–2015); Athagarh	1980		—	Indian National Congress	Janaki I	8th	C. M. Poonacha	
11		Janaki Ballabh Patnaik (1927–2015); Athagarh	4 years, 9 months and 1 day		—	Indian National Congress	Janaki I	8th	C. M. Poonacha	
11		Janaki Ballabh Patnaik (1927–2015); Athagarh	Former Union Minister of State for Defence who assumed office after the Congress won 118 seats in 1980. Enacted policies promoting industrial growth and facilitated central public sector investments, including the National Aluminium Company (NALCO). Became the first Chief Minister of Odisha to complete a full five-year term.						C. M. Poonacha	
11		Janaki Ballabh Patnaik (1927–2015); Athagarh	10 March 1985	7 December 1989	—	Indian National Congress	Janaki II	9th	Bishambhar Nath Pande	
11		Janaki Ballabh Patnaik (1927–2015); Athagarh	1985		—	Indian National Congress	Janaki II	9th	Bishambhar Nath Pande	
11		Janaki Ballabh Patnaik (1927–2015); Athagarh	4 years, 8 months and 27 days		—	Indian National Congress	Janaki II	9th	Bishambhar Nath Pande	
11		Janaki Ballabh Patnaik (1927–2015); Athagarh	Re-elected following the Congress victory in 1985. Continued the expansion of designated industrial areas and infrastructure around Bhubaneswar. Resigned in December 1989 following internal party deliberations and the defeat of the Congress in the state during the 1989 general elections.						Bishambhar Nath Pande	
12		Hemananda Biswal (1939–2022); Laikera	7 December 1989	5 March 1990	—	Indian National Congress	Biswal I	9th	Saiyid Nurul Hasan	
12		Hemananda Biswal (1939–2022); Laikera	—		—	Indian National Congress	Biswal I	9th	Saiyid Nurul Hasan	
12		Hemananda Biswal (1939–2022); Laikera	2 months and 26 days		—	Indian National Congress	Biswal I	9th	Saiyid Nurul Hasan	
12		Hemananda Biswal (1939–2022); Laikera	Elected to succeed J. B. Patnaik as Chief Minister, becoming the first tribal leader to head the state administration. Served for three months until the conclusion of the Ninth Assembly's term and the March 1990 elections.						Saiyid Nurul Hasan	
(3)		Biju Patnaik (1916–1997); Bhubaneswar	5 March 1990	15 March 1995	—	Janata Dal	Biju II	10th	Yagya Dutt Sharma	
(3)		Biju Patnaik (1916–1997); Bhubaneswar	1990		—	Janata Dal	Biju II	10th	Yagya Dutt Sharma	
(3)		Biju Patnaik (1916–1997); Bhubaneswar	5 years and 10 days		—	Janata Dal	Biju II	10th	Yagya Dutt Sharma	
(3)		Biju Patnaik (1916–1997); Bhubaneswar	Returned to office after the Janata Dal won 123 of 147 seats in the 1990 assembly elections. Enacted 33 percent statutory reservation for women in local self-government institutions, revised agricultural minimum wages, established the State Commission for Women, and created public grievance redressal mechanisms. Completed a full five-year term.						Yagya Dutt Sharma	
(11)		Janaki Ballabh Patnaik (1927–2015); Begunia	15 March 1995	17 February 1999	—	Indian National Congress	Janaki III	11th	B. Satya Narayan Reddy	
(11)		Janaki Ballabh Patnaik (1927–2015); Begunia	1995		—	Indian National Congress	Janaki III	11th	B. Satya Narayan Reddy	
(11)		Janaki Ballabh Patnaik (1927–2015); Begunia	3 years, 11 months and 2 days		—	Indian National Congress	Janaki III	11th	B. Satya Narayan Reddy	
(11)		Janaki Ballabh Patnaik (1927–2015); Begunia	Formed his third ministry after the Congress won 80 seats in the 1995 elections. Enacted statutory liquor prohibition in the state and carried out power-sector restructuring through the unbundling of the state electricity board and the establishment of GRIDCO. Resigned in February 1999 following public controversies and law-and-order incidents.						B. Satya Narayan Reddy	
13		Giridhar Gamang (born 1943); Laxmipur	17 February 1999	6 December 1999	—	Indian National Congress	Gamang	11th	C. Rangarajan	
13		Giridhar Gamang (born 1943); Laxmipur	—		—	Indian National Congress	Gamang	11th	C. Rangarajan	
13		Giridhar Gamang (born 1943); Laxmipur	9 months and 19 days		—	Indian National Congress	Gamang	11th	C. Rangarajan	
13		Giridhar Gamang (born 1943); Laxmipur	Appointed Chief Minister following J. B. Patnaik's resignation. Participated in the April 1999 parliamentary confidence motion in the Lok Sabha. Directed early disaster-relief coordination during the October 1999 Odisha cyclone before stepping down in December 1999.						C. Rangarajan	
(12)		Hemananda Biswal (1939–2022); Laikera	6 December 1999	5 March 2000	—	Indian National Congress	Biswal II	11th	M. M. Rajendran	
(12)		Hemananda Biswal (1939–2022); Laikera	—		—	Indian National Congress	Biswal II	11th	M. M. Rajendran	
(12)		Hemananda Biswal (1939–2022); Laikera	2 months and 28 days		—	Indian National Congress	Biswal II	11th	M. M. Rajendran	
(12)		Hemananda Biswal (1939–2022); Laikera	Appointed for a second term in December 1999 to supervise relief and rehabilitation administration in districts affected by the 1999 cyclone and conduct the administration through the February 2000 assembly elections.						M. M. Rajendran	
14		Naveen Patnaik (born 1946); Hinjili	5 March 2000	16 May 2004	—	Biju Janata Dal	Naveen I	12th	M. M. Rajendran	
14		Naveen Patnaik (born 1946); Hinjili	2000		—	Biju Janata Dal	Naveen I	12th	M. M. Rajendran	
14		Naveen Patnaik (born 1946); Hinjili	4 years, 2 months and 11 days		—	Biju Janata Dal	Naveen I	12th	M. M. Rajendran	
14		Naveen Patnaik (born 1946); Hinjili	Former Union Minister of Mines who took office heading the Biju Janata Dal–Bharatiya Janata Party coalition government. Addressed state fiscal management to reduce budgetary deficits and established the Mission Shakti program to organize women's self-help groups.						M. M. Rajendran	
14		Naveen Patnaik (born 1946); Hinjili	16 May 2004	21 May 2009	—	Biju Janata Dal	Naveen II	13th	M. M. Rajendran	
14		Naveen Patnaik (born 1946); Hinjili	2004		—	Biju Janata Dal	Naveen II	13th	M. M. Rajendran	
14		Naveen Patnaik (born 1946); Hinjili	5 years and 5 days		—	Biju Janata Dal	Naveen II	13th	M. M. Rajendran	
14		Naveen Patnaik (born 1946); Hinjili	Formed a second coalition ministry with the BJP following the 2004 elections. Concluded state industrial development agreements in mineral processing, steel, and energy. The coalition ended in March 2009 following political differences, after which he led an independent ministry through the 2009 elections.						M. M. Rajendran	
14		Naveen Patnaik (born 1946); Hinjili	21 May 2009	21 May 2014	—	Biju Janata Dal	Naveen III	14th	Murlidhar Chandrakant Bhandare	
14		Naveen Patnaik (born 1946); Hinjili	2009		—	Biju Janata Dal	Naveen III	14th	Murlidhar Chandrakant Bhandare	
14		Naveen Patnaik (born 1946); Hinjili	5 years		—	Biju Janata Dal	Naveen III	14th	Murlidhar Chandrakant Bhandare	
14		Naveen Patnaik (born 1946); Hinjili	Secured a legislative majority without pre-poll alliances in 2009. Expanded public distribution of subsidized foodgrains for low-income households and coordinated large-scale preventive evacuations during Cyclone Phailin in October 2013.						Murlidhar Chandrakant Bhandare	
14		Naveen Patnaik (born 1946); Hinjili	21 May 2014	29 May 2019	—	Biju Janata Dal	Naveen IV	15th	S. C. Jamir	
14		Naveen Patnaik (born 1946); Hinjili	2014		—	Biju Janata Dal	Naveen IV	15th	S. C. Jamir	
14		Naveen Patnaik (born 1946); Hinjili	5 years and 8 days		—	Biju Janata Dal	Naveen IV	15th	S. C. Jamir	
14		Naveen Patnaik (born 1946); Hinjili	Formed his fourth ministry after the BJD won 117 seats in 2014. Instituted the Biju Swasthya Kalyan Yojana health coverage program, the KALIA financial support initiative for cultivators, and upgraded sports infrastructure in Bhubaneswar, hosting the 2018 Men's Hockey World Cup.						S. C. Jamir	
14		Naveen Patnaik (born 1946); Hinjili	29 May 2019	12 June 2024	—	Biju Janata Dal	Naveen V	16th	Ganeshi Lal	
14		Naveen Patnaik (born 1946); Hinjili	2019		—	Biju Janata Dal	Naveen V	16th	Ganeshi Lal	
14		Naveen Patnaik (born 1946); Hinjili	5 years and 14 days		—	Biju Janata Dal	Naveen V	16th	Ganeshi Lal	
14		Naveen Patnaik (born 1946); Hinjili	Took office for a fifth term following the 2019 elections. Directed disaster management during Cyclone Fani, state public health operations during the COVID-19 pandemic, and the development of the Jagannath Heritage Corridor in Puri. Stepped down following the 2024 elections and assumed the post of Leader of the Opposition.						Ganeshi Lal	
15		Mohan Charan Majhi (born 1972); Keonjhar	12 June 2024	Incumbent	Home; General Administration and Public Grievance; Finance; Information and Public Relations; Water Resources; Planning and Convergence	Bharatiya Janata Party	Majhi	17th	Raghubar Das	
15		Mohan Charan Majhi (born 1972); Keonjhar	2024		Home; General Administration and Public Grievance; Finance; Information and Public Relations; Water Resources; Planning and Convergence	Bharatiya Janata Party	Majhi	17th	Raghubar Das	
15		Mohan Charan Majhi (born 1972); Keonjhar	2 years, 4 months and 11 days		Home; General Administration and Public Grievance; Finance; Information and Public Relations; Water Resources; Planning and Convergence	Bharatiya Janata Party	Majhi	17th	Raghubar Das	
15		Mohan Charan Majhi (born 1972); Keonjhar	Four-term MLA from Keonjhar who formed the first Bharatiya Janata Party ministry in Odisha after the 2024 elections. Implemented administrative measures including reopening the gates of the Jagannath Temple in Puri, revising the minimum support price for paddy, and initiating the Subhadra direct-benefit transfer scheme for women.						Raghubar Das	

== Statistics ==
=== Timeline of governance by party and administration ===
Share of time in office by political party and constitutional administration
Pre-independence and transitional era (1 April 1937 – 20 February 1952)	Republican era (20 February 1952 – present)
1. Indian National Congress (57.2%); 2. National Party (20.4%); 3. Governor's / Section 93 Rule (22.5%)	1. Indian National Congress (44.6%); 2. Biju Janata Dal (32.5%); 3. Janata Dal (6.74%); 4. Swatantra Party (5.14%); 5. Janata Party (3.54%); 6. Bharatiya Janata Party (3.14%); 7. President's rule (2.77%); 8. Independent (1.61%)

(Note: The first chart covers the administration of Orissa Province from 1 April 1937 through the transitional period ending on 20 February 1952, incorporating the premiers' tenures as well as periods of direct provincial administration under Section 93 of the Government of India Act 1935 (Governor's Rule). Percentages are calculated from elapsed days in office. The second chart covers the period from 20 February 1952 to 19 October 2026 (27,270 elapsed days), reflecting the share of days in office for each political party and periods of President's rule.)

=== List of chief ministers by length of tenure ===
Chief Ministers of Odisha by length of tenure (1950–present)
Rank	Chief Minister	Political party	Length of tenure	
Rank	Chief Minister	Political party	Longest continuous term	Total time in office
1	Naveen Patnaik	Biju Janata Dal	24 years, 99 days	24 years, 99 days
2	Janaki Ballabh Patnaik	Indian National Congress	9 years, 181 days	13 years, 155 days
3	Biju Patnaik	Janata Dal (INC: 1961–1963)	5 years, 10 days	7 years, 111 days
4	Nabakrushna Choudhuri	Indian National Congress	6 years, 160 days	6 years, 160 days
5	Harekrushna Mahatab	Indian National Congress	4 years, 129 days	4 years, 236 days
6	Rajendra Narayan Singh Deo	Swatantra Party	3 years, 307 days	3 years, 307 days
7	Nandini Satpathy	Indian National Congress (R)	2 years, 285 days	3 years, 182 days
8	Nilamani Routray	Janata Party	2 years, 236 days	2 years, 236 days
9	Mohan Charan Majhi (Incumbent)	Bharatiya Janata Party	2 years, 133 days	2 years, 133 days
10	Sadashiva Tripathy	Indian National Congress	2 years, 15 days	2 years, 15 days
11	Biren Mitra	Indian National Congress	1 year, 142 days	1 year, 142 days
12	Bishwanath Das	Independent	1 year, 72 days	1 year, 72 days
13	Giridhar Gamang	Indian National Congress	292 days	292 days
14	Hemananda Biswal	Indian National Congress	90 days	178 days
15	Binayak Acharya	Indian National Congress (R)	122 days	122 days

== See also ==
- Government of Odisha
- Governor of Odisha
- Deputy Chief Minister of Odisha
- Speaker of the Odisha Legislative Assembly
- Leader of the Opposition in the Odisha Legislative Assembly
- Odisha Legislative Assembly
- Elections in Odisha
- History of Odisha
- Politics of Odisha
- List of current Indian chief ministers
