= National Award for Child Welfare =

Indian civil award

- Civilian award
- Awarded for: Award given to institutions and individuals for outstanding performance in field of child development and welfare.
- Sponsored by: Government of India
- Rewards: ₹100,000 (US$1,100) (for individuals) ₹300,000 (US$3,200) (for institutions)
- First award: 1979
- Final award: 2016

National Award for Child Welfare is a national award in India. Instituted in 1979, the award is conferred to "institutions and individuals for their outstanding performance in the field of child development and welfare". The award consists of a cash prize of ₹100,000 (US$1,100) (for individuals) and ₹300,000 (US$3,200) (for institutions).

== See also ==
- Indian honours system
