= Vysyaraju Kasi Viswanadham Raju =

Indian politician

Vysyaraju Kasi Viswanadham Raju was an Indian politician from Odisha.

== Life ==
Raju was a member of the first Orissa Legislative Assembly which met from 1937 to 1945. He was one of the members from Berhampur. He was a member of the opposition.
