= Bodhram Dubey =

20th-c. Indian government official

Bodhram Dubey (born 1894 – died ?) was an Indian government official.

== Early life and education ==
Bodhram Dubey was born in 1894 in Jharsuguda district of Orissa. He was the eldest son of Sri Sobharam Dubey. His grandfather, Sri Loknath Dubey was a close associate of Veer Surendra Sai, a revolutionary who fought against the British rule of India.

He passed his matriculation examination at CSB Zilla School, Sambalpur. After graduating from Ravenshaw College, he gained a first-class post-graduate qualification in mathematics from Calcutta University. He also obtained his law degree there, after which practiced as an advocate in Sambalpur.

== Career ==
Bodhram Dubey (3rd Left) in First Ministry of Orissa

Dubey participated in the independence movement and was a member of the Congress Party. In 1937, he became a member of first Congress Ministry. He was in charge of education under the premiership of Bishwanath Das until 4 November 1939.

His Ministry introduced the basic system of education as per the Zakir Husain committee recommendation, and the committee constituted by the Central Advisory Board of Education (CABE). This was meant to encourage the spirit of self-esteem in young children in Orissa. Under his tenure as an education minister, the number of students in primary school rose from 279,924 to 2,869,201 and in secondary school from 30,427 to 34,587.

He resigned on 3 September 1939 in protest at the decision to take British India into World War II without consulting the Congress party.

Subsequently, Sri Dubey became a member of Rajya Sabha. He served as a standing Councillor of Odisha government.
