= Frieda Hauswirth =

Swiss artist

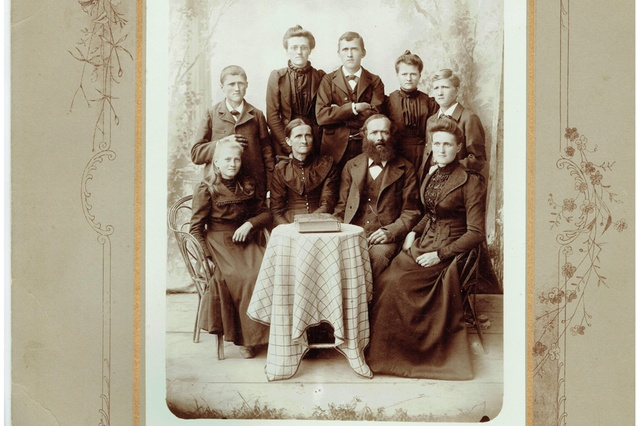
Frieda Hauswirth (left front) with family c. 1900

Frieda Mathilda Hauswirth (8 February 1886 – March 1974) was a Swiss artist and writer. She lived in California and for some time in India after her second marriage to Sarangadhar Das. A staunch anti-imperialist, she wrote on a range of topics from Indian culture to feminism. Her book A Marriage to India was autobiographical.

Hauswirth was born, the ninth of ten children of Maria Magdalena (Reuteler) and Karl Emanuel Hauswirth from a farming family in Gstaad, Berne. After studying at Bern and Zurich she went to Stanford University, graduating in 1910. She studied with Gottardo Piazzoni and attended the California School of Fine Art, San Francisco. She married another Stanford art student, Arthur Lee Munger, in an unusual marriage at Temple Square, Palo Alto, on 7 August 1910, where there was no inferiority or submission on the part of the bride and involved only placement of wedding rings with a statement of nuptial vows. They divorced in 1916.

In 1916, Hauswirth assisted Lala Lajpat Rai by writing two chapters, on the history of the United States and the women movement, for his book The United States of America: A Hindu’s Impressions and a study. Around the same time she met Sarangadhar Das in Berkeley and they married in 1917. Shortly after their marriage, her association with Har Dayal led to their being called as witnesses in the Hindu-German Conspiracy Trial during which one Indian was assassinated in the courtroom. The couple moved to Calcutta in 1920 as Das was refused US citizenship on account of being a Hindu (at that time, naturalization was limited to "free white persons" and those of African nativity and descent) while Hauswirth herself also lost her citizenship. After they moved to India, she was not accepted by Das's family and some of his orthodox Hindu friends and seeing that she came in the way of Das's political ambitions, she later chose to live separately. Hauswirth wrote extensively and painted. She held exhibitions of her paintings around the world including in New York, Boston, San Francisco, Paris, London, and Bangalore. She left India after nine years, disillusioned, to live in Brooklyn, New York but visited India periodically. She collected Indian sculpture. She died in Davis, California, and her ashes were buried in Saanen Cemetery.

Her books include:

- A Marriage to India (1931)
- Gandhi. A Portrait from Life (1931)
- Leap-home and Gentlebrawn (1932)
- Purdah: The Status of Indian Women (1932)
- Into the Sun (1933)
- Meine indische Ehe (1933)
- Schleier vor Indiens Frauengemächern (1935)
- Two chapters in Lala Lajpat Rai's The United States of America: A Hindu’s Impression, 1916.
