= Gouranga Charan Das =

- Born: 26 January 1899; Bagalpur, Cuttack District (Now Jagatshingpur), British India
- Died: 19 February 1972; Cuttack, Odisha
- Other names: Gouri Bhai

Gouranga Charan Das (1899–1972) was a Gandhian freedom fighter, and leader of the socialist Kissan Movement and Gadajat Praja Andolon in Odisha. He was a renowned personality in British India.

== Biography ==
Gouranga Charan Das was born in Bagalpur in the then-district of Cuttack (now Jagatshingpur district) in British India on January 26, 1899. He was physically handicapped from birth, with his right hand critically crippled. In his early youth, he was inspired by Mahatma Gandhi's call and joined the Freedom Movement. He was jailed many times for his participation in the freedom struggle.

Das began his first imprisonment on April 13, 1930, by leading the salt movement at Inchudi. He was incarcerated for more than six years by the British authorities for participating in the Salt Movement, the Individual Satyagraha, and the Quit India Movement. During the Quit India Movement, eighteen freedom fighters from his village, Bagalpur, were imprisoned, and thousands joined the struggle under his leadership. He was also deeply involved with the Charkha movement.

Das was a key organizer of the Congress Socialist Party alongside Nabakrushna Choudhuri and Bhagabati Charan Panigrahi. He made significant strides in social reform by persuading the aristocratic Karans of his village to permit Harijans to enter the famous Dadhibamanjew temple.

Das was elected uncontested to the Orissa Assembly in 1946 and served as Chairman of the Cuttack Zilla Parishad from 1961 to 1967. Known for his simplicity and decisiveness, he died on February 19, 1972. His only son, Shashi Bhusan Das, also participated in the freedom movement and was imprisoned by the British. Both father and son dedicated their lives to the cause of India's independence, becoming formidable forces against the British and local oppressors allied with them.
