= Sarangadhar Das =

Indian politician

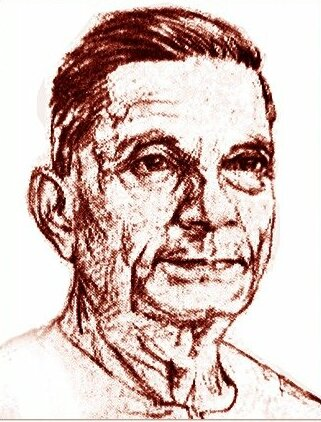
- Born: 17 October 1886; Dhenkanal princely state, British India
- Died: 18 September 1957 (aged 70); Cuttack, Odisha, India
- Education: Ravenshaw College; Tokyo Institute of Technology; University of California, Berkeley
- Known for: Indian freedom movement
- Spouse: Frieda Hauswirth

Sarangadhar Das (1886—1957) was an Indian nationalist revolutionary and Orissa politician. Das fought against the feudal chiefs in Orissa (present day Odisha) and, post-independence, was a member of India's Constituent Assembly, a Member of Parliament, and a leader of the Socialist Party.

== Early life ==
Sarangadhar Das was born in Dhenkanal in 1886, the son of Harekrishna Sumanta Patnaik.

== Education ==
He studied at the Ravenshaw College in Cuttack.

In 1907, he traveled to Japan to study at the Tokyo Institute of Technology, with financial support from the King of Dhenkanal.

In 1909, he traveled to the United States, where he studied sugar technology at the University of California, Berkeley. He then worked as a chief chemist at a sugar factory in Honolulu, Hawaii. In 1911, while in Berkeley, he published an informational document called "Information for Indian Students Intending to Come to the Pacific Coast of the United States", that contained practical information and advice about student life for Indians in the United States.

== Return to India ==
After returning to India, Sarangadhar tried establishing a sugar factory in Orissa, but failed. He then worked as an activist against the feudal chiefs who held power at the time.

== Political life ==
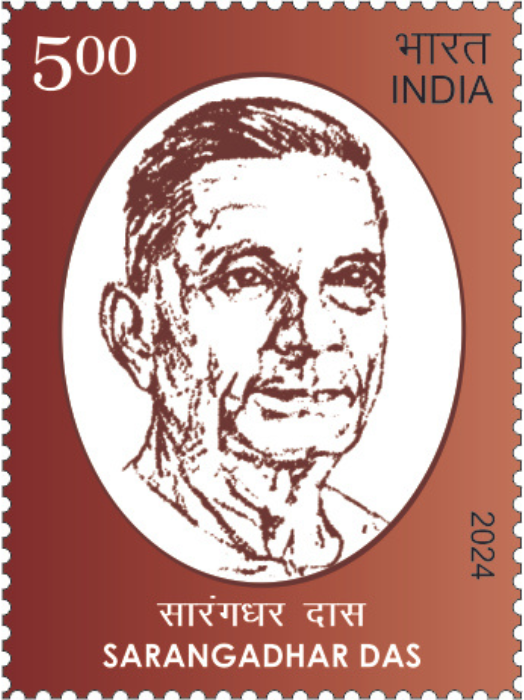
A 2024 stamp of India dedicated to Sarangadhar Das

From 1937 to 1946, he was the General Secretary of the Orissa States People's Conference. He was President of the Orissa and C.P. States Regional Council from 1946 to 1947. He was also a member of the Standing Committee of the All India States People's Conference from 1939-1943, and its General Secretary from 1947-1948.

His political career included both the Congress Party and the socialist parties. He was a member of the AICC from 1939 to 1945, and of the Orissa Legislative Assembly from 1946 to 1949. He then resigned from Congress and joined the Socialist Party.

Das joined the Constituent Assembly of India charged with framing newly independent India's constitution, and of the Provisional Parliament.

He served as Chairman of the Socialist Party (Utkal) from 1951 to 1952, and Deputy Leader of the Praja Socialist Party in the House of the People, from 1952 to 1953.

He remained with the Socialist Party until his death in 1957.

According to his Lok Sabha profile, his areas of interest included "basic education and work among Adivasis and Harijans, and the education of peasants and labourers."

== Publications ==
- "Information for Indian Students Intending to Come to the Pacific Coast of the United States" (1909)
- "The Development of Sugar Industry in India"
- "Bikaner—a Political and Economic Survey"
- "Orissa Sarakara Kathagadare (The Govt of Odisha is in Dock) "
