= Harekrushna Mahatab =

Indian politician (1899 – 1987)

Utkal Keshari Harekrushna Mahatab
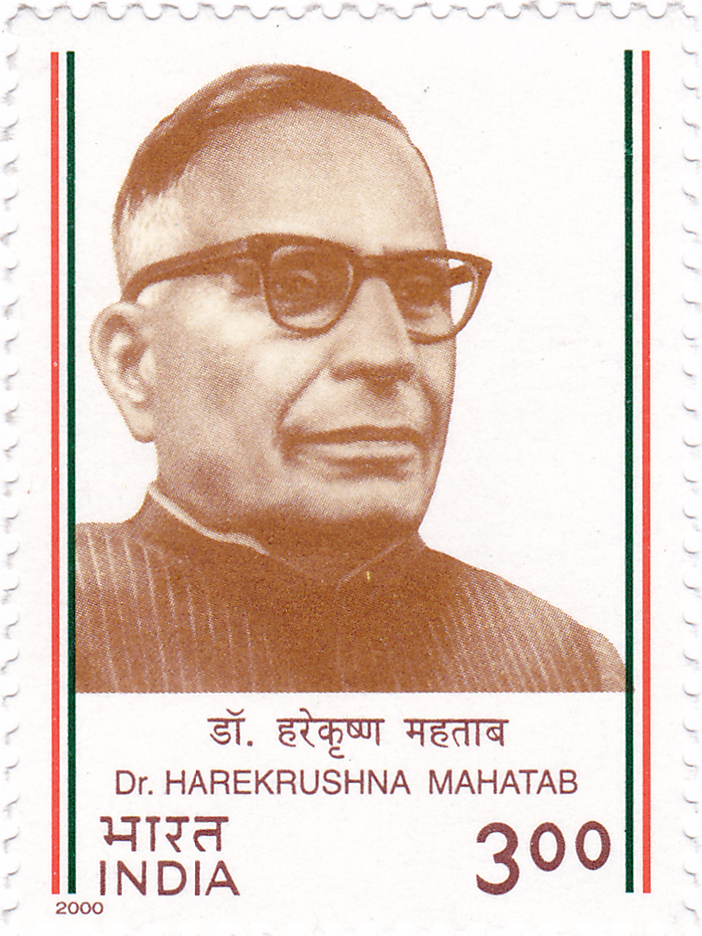
- Mahatab on a 2000 stamp of India

1st Chief Minister of Odisha
- In office 19 October 1956 – 25 February 1961
- Preceded by: Nabakrushna Choudhuri
- Succeeded by: Bijayananda Pattanaik
- In office 26 January 1950 – 12 May 1950
- Preceded by: Office Established (himself as Prime Minister of Orissa)
- Succeeded by: Nabakrushna Choudhuri

3rd Prime Minister of Orissa
- In office 23 April 1946 – 26 January 1950
- Preceded by: Krushna Chandra Gajapati
- Succeeded by: Position Abolished (himself as Chief Minister of Orissa)

Governor of Bombay
- In office 2 March 1955 – 14 October 1956
- Chief Minister: Morarji Desai
- Preceded by: Girija Shankar Bajpai
- Succeeded by: Sri Prakasa

Member of Parliament, Lok Sabha
- In office 1952–1955
- Succeeded by: Nityanand Kanungo
- Constituency: Cuttack
- In office 1962–1967
- Preceded by: Badakumar Pratap Gangadeb
- Succeeded by: D. N. Deb
- Constituency: Angul

Minister of Commerce and Industry of India
- In office 13 May 1950 – 26 December 1950
- Preceded by: Syama Prasad Mukherjee
- Succeeded by: Nityanand Kanungo

Personal details
- Born: Harekrushna Das; 21 November 1899 Agarpada, Bengal Presidency, British India (now in Odisha)
- Died: 2 January 1987 (aged 87)
- Party: Indian National Congress; Orissa Jana Congress; Janata Party
- Spouse: Subhadra Devi
- Children: Bhartruhari Mahtab
- Education: Ravenshaw College
- Writing career
- Language: Odia, English
- Period: Colonial/Post Colonial India
- Genres: History, Biographies, Academic Theses
- Subjects: Indian Politics, History
- Notable work: Gaon Majlis
- Notable awards: Sahitya Akademi Award

Harekrushna Mahatab (born Harekrushna Das, 21 November 1899 – 2 January 1987) was a leader of the Indian National Congress, a notable figure in the Indian independence movement and the Chief Minister of Odisha from 1946 to 1950 and from 1956 to 1961. He was popularly known by the sobriquet "Utkal Keshari".

== Early life ==
Harekrushna Mahtab was born in Agarpada village of present-day Bhadrak district, Odisha, to Krushna Charan Das and Tohpha Debi. According to Mahtab's own account, his family traced its origins to Amritsar in Punjab. It is believed that their ancestors belonged to a Kshetri community that accompanied the Mughal army during Emperor Akbar's campaign in Odisha. He was adopted by his maternal grandfather Jaganath Mahtab, a zamindar of Agarpada. After passing his matriculation examination from Bhadrak High School, he joined Ravenshaw College, Cuttack but left his studies in 1921 to join the independence movement.

== Political career ==
In 1922, Mahatab was imprisoned and charged with sedition. He was the Chairman of Balasore District Board from 1924 to 1928. He became a member of Bihar and Odisha Council in 1924. He joined the Salt Satyagraha movement and was imprisoned again in 1930. He was elected as the General Officer Commanding of Congress Sevadal for the AICC session at Puri in 1932 and was arrested when the party was banned. He participated in the movement against untouchability in 1934 and opened his ancestral temple to all for the first time in Odisha. Later, he started Gandhi Karma Mandir at Agarpada. He was the President of Utkal Pradesh Congress Committee from 1930 to 1931 and again in 1937. He was nominated to the Congress Working Committee by Subhas Chandra Bose in 1938 and continued till 1946 and again from 1946 to 1950. He was the President of State Peoples' Enquiry Committee in 1938 and recommended cancellation of Sanada of the rulers and merger of the erstwhile princely states with Odisha Province. He participated in the Quit India Movement in 1942 and was imprisoned from 1942 to 1945.

Mahatab was the first Chief Minister of Odisha from 23 April 1946 to 12 May 1950. He was the Union Minister of Commerce and Industry from 1950 to 1952. He became the secretary general of the Congress Parliamentary Party in 1952. He was the Governor of Bombay from 1955 to 1956. After resigning from Governorship in 1956, he again became the Chief Minister of Odisha from 1956 to 1960. During his tenures as the Chief Minister, he played a significant role in the merger and integration of former princely states, shifting of the capital from Cuttack to Bhubaneshwar and the sanction and construction of the multi-purpose Hirakud Dam Project. He was elected to the Lok Sabha in 1962 from Angul and became the vice-president of the Indian National Congress in 1966. In 1966, he resigned from the Congress and led the Orissa Jana Congress. He was elected to the Odisha Legislative Assembly in 1967, 1971 and 1974. He was imprisoned in 1976 for protesting against the Emergency.

== Intellectual pursuits ==
He was the founder of the Prajatantra Prachar Samiti and started the weekly magazine Prajatantra in 1923 at Balasore, which later became the Daily Prajatantra. He was the chief editor of a monthly journal Jhankar since its inception. He also published the Weekly English paper The Eastern Times and was its chief editor.

He received the Sahitya Academy award in 1983 for the third volume of his well-known work, Gaon Majlis.

== Awards and honours ==
He was the President of Orissa Sahitya Academy and Sangit Natak Academy for a couple of terms. He received an honorary Doctorate degree from Andhra University, an honorary D.Litt. from Utkal University and an honorary Doctorate of Law from Sagar University.
The Odisha State Central Library, the apex library of the state public library system of Odisha is named after him as Harekrushna Mahtab State Library. It was established in 1959 with 3 acre campus at state capital, Bhubaneswar.

Government offices
Preceded by Bishwanath Das	Chief Minister of Odisha; 23 April 1946 to 12 May 1950	Succeeded by Nabakrushna Choudhuri
Preceded by Girija Shankar Bajpai	Governor of Bombay; 2 March 1955 to 14 October 1956	Succeeded by Sri Prakasa
Preceded by Nabakrushna Choudhuri	Chief Minister of Odisha; 19 October 1956 to 25 February 1961	Succeeded by Biju Pattanaik
