= Lingaraj Misra =

Indian politician

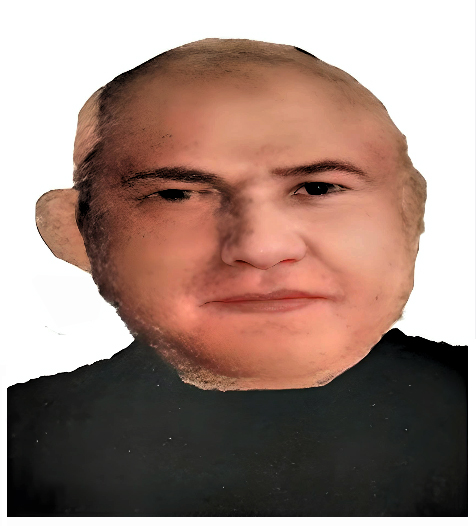
- Colorized image of Lokanath Mishra

Member of Parliament, Rajya Sabha
- In office 1957-1957
- Constituency: Odisha

Personal details
- Born: 1894
- Died: 19 December 1957 (aged 62–63)
- Party: Indian National Congress
- Spouse: Uma Devi

Lingaraj Misra was an Indian politician. He was a Member of Parliament, representing Odisha in the Rajya Sabha the upper house of India's Parliament as a member of the Indian National Congress.
