= Bishwanath Das =

Indian politician, lawyer, and philanthropist

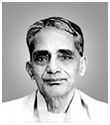

7th Chief Minister of Orissa
- In office 3 April 1971 – 14 June 1972
- Preceded by: Rajendra Narayan Singh Deo
- Succeeded by: Nandini Satpathy
- In office 19 July 1937 – 4 November 1939 (Note: As Prime Minister of Orissa Province.)
- Preceded by: Krushna Chandra Gajapati
- Succeeded by: Governor's rule

Governor of Uttar Pradesh
- In office 16 April 1962 – 30 April 1967
- Preceded by: Burgula Ramakrishna Rao
- Succeeded by: Bezawada Gopala Reddy

Personal details
- Born: Bishwanath Dash; 8 March 1889 Belagan, Madras Presidency, British India
- Died: 2 June 1984 (aged 95) Cuttack, Orissa, India
- Education: Ravenshaw College; Calcutta University

Bishwanath Das (né Dash; 8 March 1889 – 2 June 1984) was an Indian politician, lawyer and philanthropist. He was the prime minister of Orissa Province of British India 1937–1939, the governor of Uttar Pradesh 1962–1967 and later Chief Minister of Odisha 1971–1972.

== Early life ==
He was born on 8 March 1889 in a Kanyakubja Brahmin family at Belgan village in Ganjam district of the erstwhile Madras Presidency, which is in the state of Odisha. He graduated from Ravenshaw College, Cuttack. Married at an early age his only child Dr. Trinath Dash also followed on the steps of philanthropic legal practice for the poor.

== Political career ==
Bishwanath Das supported the Indian independence movement from both Odisha and Uttar Pradesh. He was a member of the legislative council of Madras Province from 1921 to 1930. He was instrumental in the creation of a separate state for the Odia-speaking people. After the separation of Orissa/Odisha from Bihar and Orissa Province on 1 April 1936, he became its prime minister (premier) on 19 July 1937. He became a member of the Constituent Assembly of India in 1946 representing Orissa. He served as the governor of Uttar Pradesh from 16 April 1962 to 30 April 1967. In 1966, he was made the president of Servants of the People Society (Lok Sevak Mandal founded by Lala Lajpat Rai).

After the 1971 Odisha Legislative Assembly election, the Utkal Congress, Swatantra Party and Jharkhand Party formed a coalition. Das became Chief Minister of Odisha under the coalition government. He was in office from 3 April 1971 to 14 June 1972. He set up multiple trusts for providing free legal support, food and vedantic learning institutions for the poor in Orissa and Uttar Pradesh from his lifetime earnings and salary. The institutions include Veda Bhavan at Puri.
