= Sadashiva Tripathy =

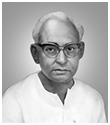

5th Chief Minister of Odisha
- In office 21 February 1965 – 8 March 1967
- Preceded by: Biren Mitra
- Succeeded by: Rajendra Narayan Singh Deo
- Constituency: Umarkot

Personal details
- Born: 21 April 1910 Nabarangpur, Madras Presidency, British India
- Died: 9 September 1980 (aged 70) Cuttack, Odisha, India
- Party: Indian National Congress
- Spouse: Tilottama Tripathy
- Children: 3 sons
- Profession: Politician

Sadashiva Tripathy (21 April 1910 – 9 September 1980) was an Indian politician, a leader of the Indian National Congress political party and the Chief Minister of Odisha from 21 February 1965 to 8 March 1967.

== Early life ==
Sadashiva was born in Nabrangpur city of Odisha on 21 April 1910 into an aristocratic family which owned large tracts of land. He participated in the Indian independence movement and went to jail.

== Political career ==
He was the member of Indian National Congress. He was elected to the Odisha Legislative Assembly for four consecutive terms first in 1951 then in 1957, 1961, and 1967. He served as the revenue minister of Odisha for a long time. He served as the Chief Minister of Odisha between 1965 February 21 to 1967 March 8.During his tenure as the Chief Minister of Odisha the Land Reforms Act was introduced in Odisha. He distributed 22 acres of land to each of his three sons and handed over the rest of the land to the government. The Indian National Congress led by him lost the assembly elections in 1967. He served as the Leader of the opposition in Odisha Legislative Assembly from 18 March 1967 to 14 September 1970.

== Later life ==
During the last stage of his life he spent a lower middle class life. At that time he was seriously ill and the state government gave him treatment for five months, he died on 9 September 1980.

Preceded by Biren Mitra	Chief Minister of Odisha; 21 February 1965 – 8 March 1967	Succeeded by Rajendra Narayan Singh Deo
