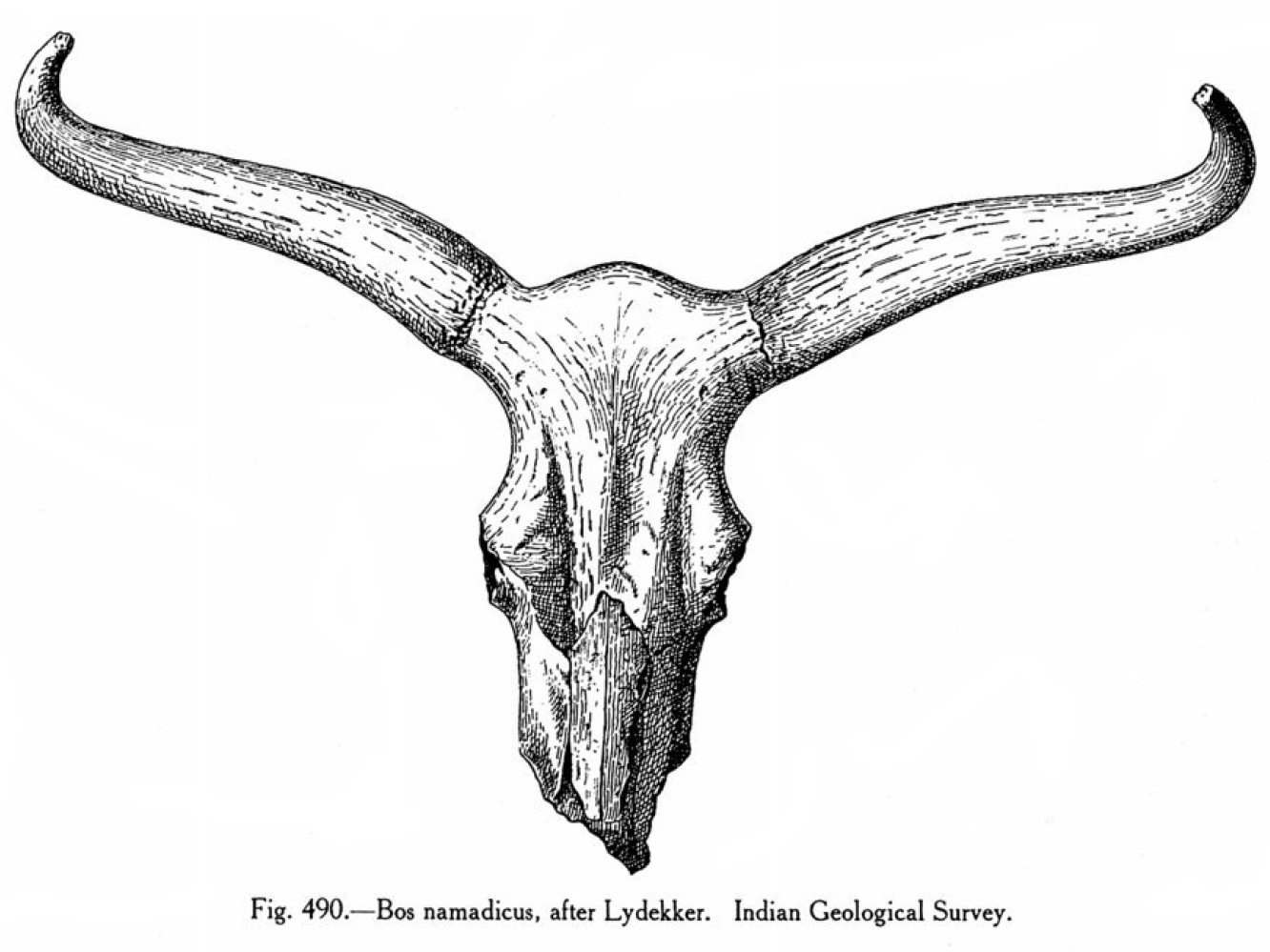
- Indian aurochs skull
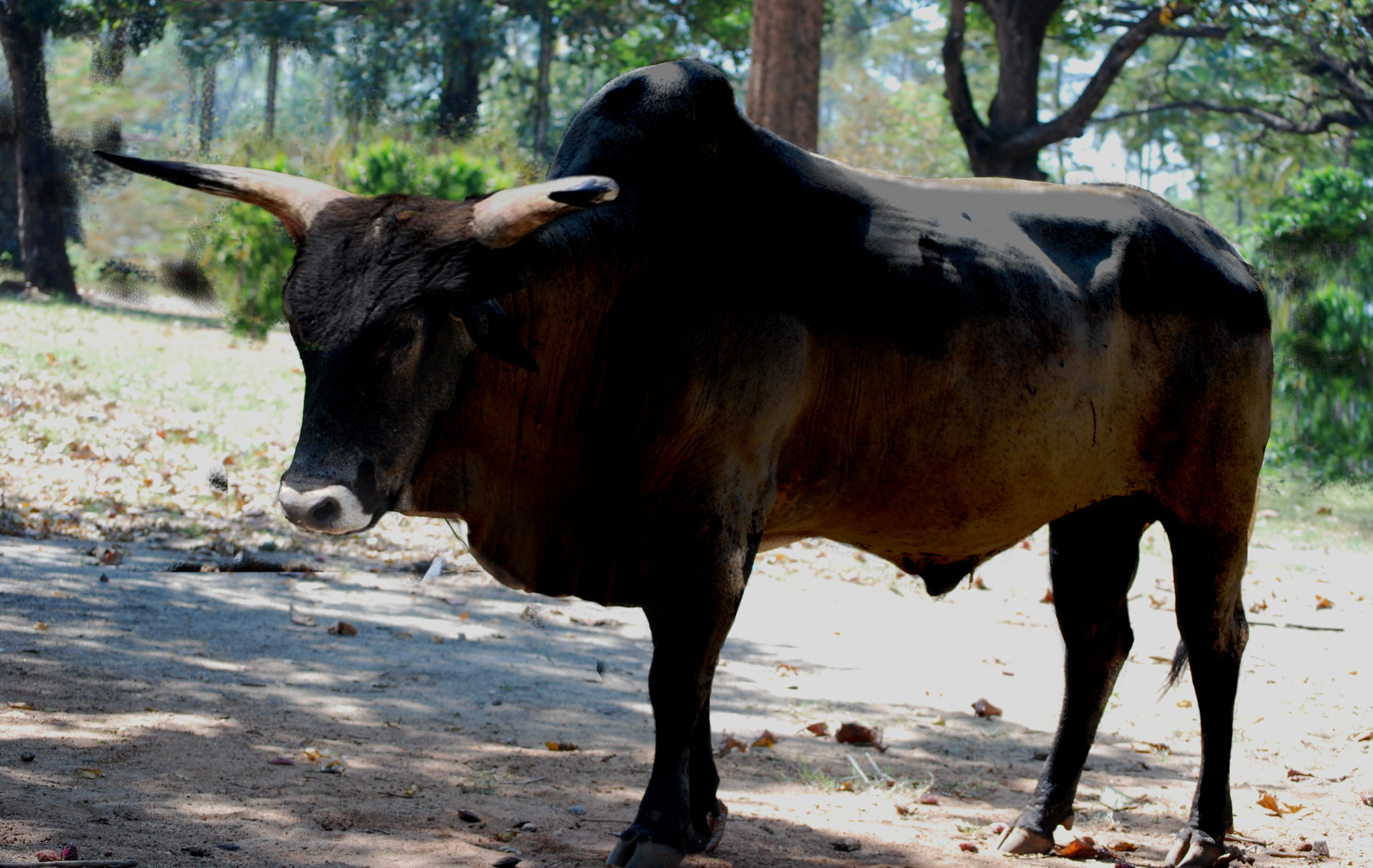

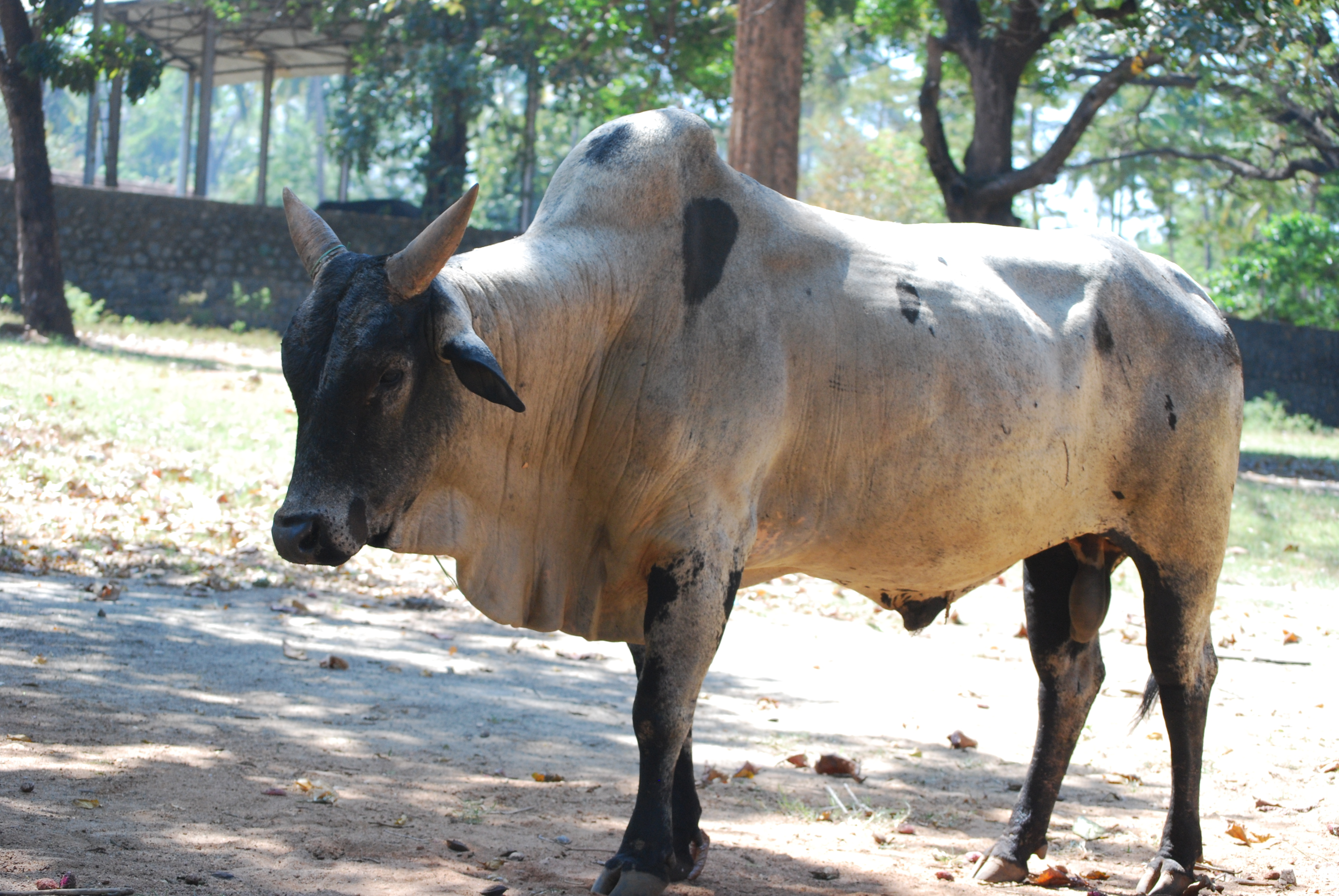
- Artist's impression (Note: aurochs horns and taurine cattle's head edited into this image of a zebu:)

Conservation status
- Extinct (no records after 3,800 YBP) (IUCN 3.1)

Scientific classification
- Kingdom: Animalia
- Phylum: Chordata
- Class: Mammalia
- Order: Artiodactyla
- Family: Bovidae
- Subfamily: Bovinae
- Genus: Bos
- Species: †B. primigenius
- Subspecies: †B. p. namadicus

Trinomial name
- †Bos primigenius namadicus (Falconer, 1859)
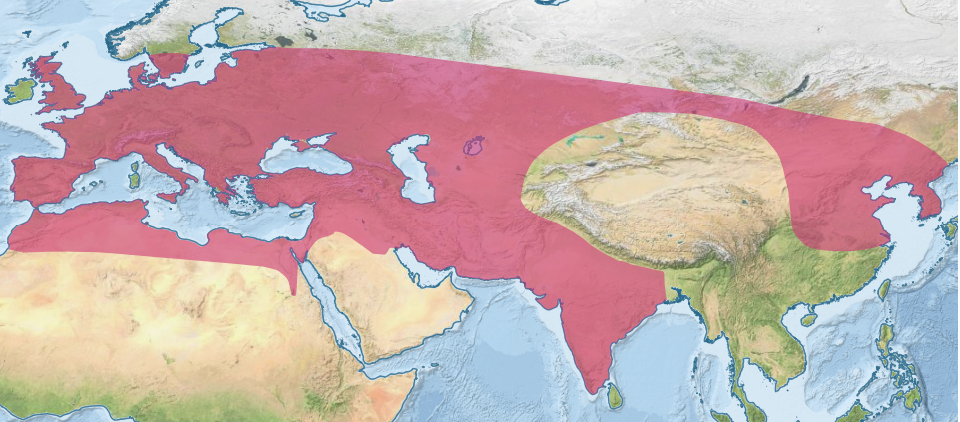
- Map of the species' distribution

Synonyms
- Bos namadicus

= Indian aurochs =

Subspecies of mammals

The Indian aurochs (Note: "Aurochs" is both the singular and the plural term used to refer to the animal.) (Bos primigenius namadicus) is an extinct subspecies of aurochs that inhabited West Asia and the Indian subcontinent from the Late Pleistocene until its eventual extinction during the South Asian Stone Age. With no remains younger than 3,800 YBP ever recovered, the Indian aurochs was the first of the three aurochs subspecies to become extinct; the Eurasian aurochs (B. p. primigenius) and the North African aurochs (B. p. mauritanicus) persevered longer, with the latter being known to the Roman Empire, and the former surviving until the mid-17th century in Central Europe.

The modern zebu breed (B. Indicus) can trace their genetic heritage to the Indian auroch and the modern day sanga breed (B. t. africanus) is partly of Indian auroch origin with additional Taurine cattle genetic influence.

== Description ==
The Indian aurochs is known exclusively from fossil and subfossil records, where it shows only minimal morphologic differences to the Eurasian subspecies (B. p. primigenius). The Indian aurochs was probably smaller than its Eurasian counterpart but had proportionally larger horns. Because the range of the aurochs species was continuous from the Atlantic coasts of North Africa and Europe to Bengal, it is uncertain whether there was a distinction or a continuum between the Eurasian, North African and Indian subspecies.

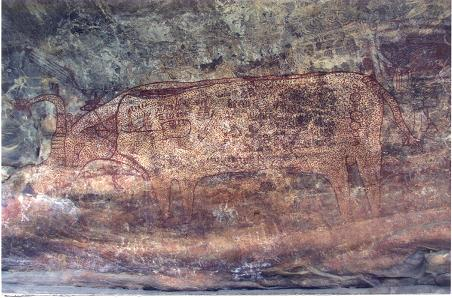
Rock painting at Bhimbetka dated to 8,000 - 3,000 BCE depicting a humpless bovine.

The last common ancestor of Indian aurochs and Eurasian aurochs (B. p. primigenius) is estimated to have lived about 150±50 ka BP, based on genetic analyses of living zebus and taurine cattle, the domesticated but heavily interbred descendants of those two aurochs subspecies. Zebu and many Sanga cattle breeds are phenotypically distinguished from taurine cattle by the presence of a prominent shoulder hump.

== Range ==
The author Cis Van Vuure considers the aurochs species to have originated about 2 million years ago in India and spread westwards. Most other authors consider an origin in Africa, where the species' oldest ever remains were found, from ancestors in the Pelorovis genus and a subsequent expansion into Eurasia more likely.

A grazing ruminant like all members of its species, the Indian aurochs roamed throughout West and South Asia in the Late Pleistocene and Early Holocene ages. Most remains are from the Kathiawar Peninsula, along the Ganges and Narmada rivers in what is today India. Some bone remains classified as Indian aurochs were also found further south, such as on the Deccan Plateau and along the Krishna River.

The most recent remains from presesnt-day southern India, which clearly belong to the Indian aurochs are from Banahalli in Karnataka, with an age of about 4,200 YBP. Further north, the most recent remains date from 3,800 YBP and were found at Mahagara in what is now Uttar Pradesh.

The Indian aurochs survived into the South Asian Stone Age, when its natural habitat steadily diminished by human pastoralism and agriculture spreading throughout the region around 5,500–4,000 YBP.

Possible predators preying on Indian aurochs are speculated to have been big cats such as lions, leopards and tigers, as well as other predatory mammals such as dholes and even giant hyenas and machairodonts such as Homotherium and Megantereon during prehistoric times.

== Domestication ==
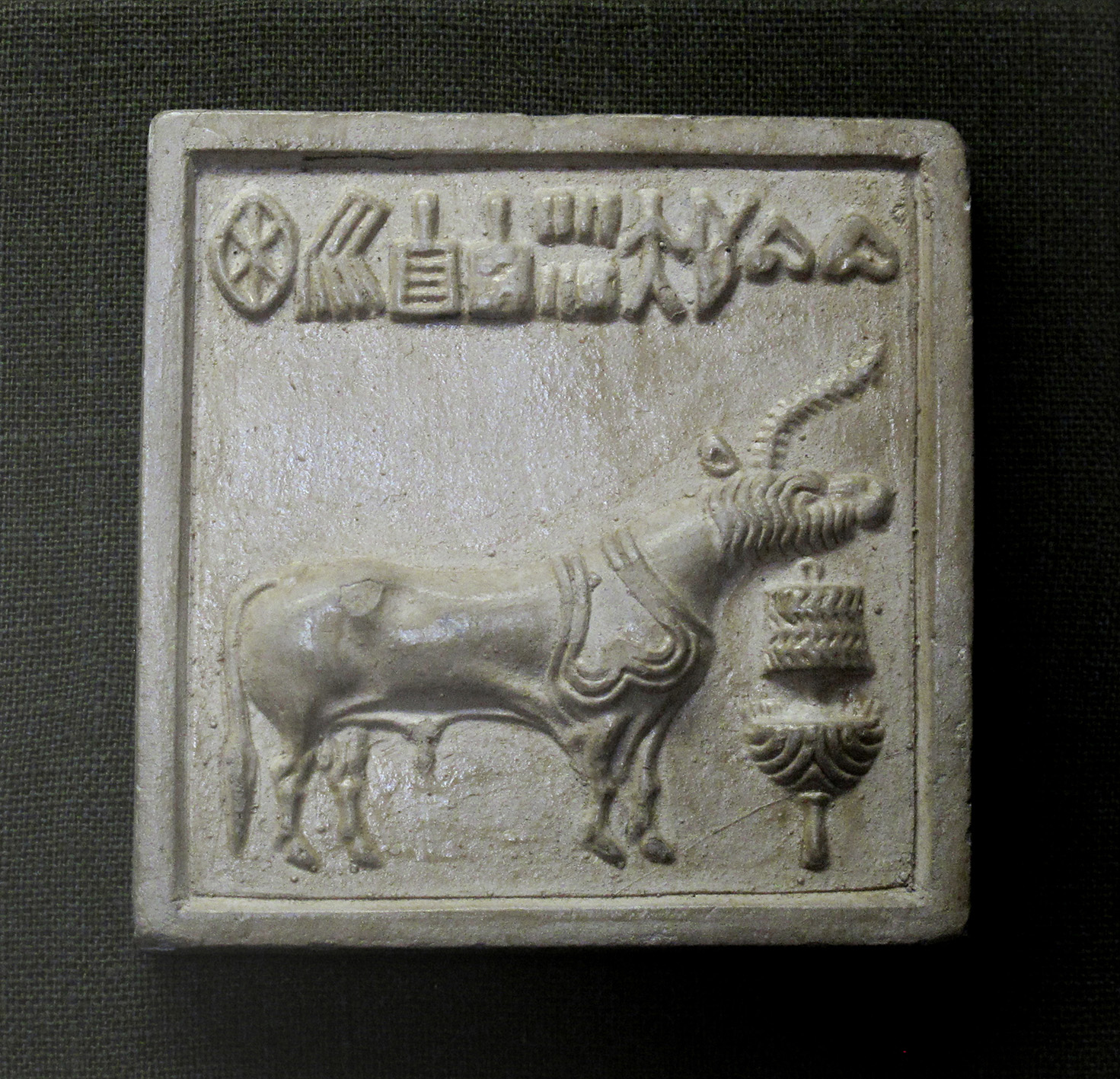
Seal of Indus valley civilization

The Indian aurochs was most likely domesticated in the Mehrgarh North Pakistan now the Baluchistan region of Pakistan around 9,000-7000 YBP, with subsequent breeding efforts eventually leading to zebu or indicine cattle. The domescation of Indicine cattle was done by people arriving from near east who promoted the neolthic in Mehrgarh.The domestication process seems to have also been prompted by the arrival of new crop species from the Near East around 9,000 YBP. Human pastoralism, enabled by domestic cattle, spread throughout the subcontinent around 5,500–4,000 YBP. Secondary domestication events - instances of additional genetic diversity acquired from interbreeding domesticated proto-indicine stock with wild aurochs cows - occurred very frequently in the Ganges basin but less so in southern India.

Domestic zebu are recorded from the Indus region since 6,000 BCE and from south India, the middle Ganges region, and present-day Gujarat since 3,500–2,000 BCE. Discounting gayal and banteng, domestic cattle seem to have been absent in southern China and southeast Asia until 2,000–1,000 BCE, when indicine cattle first appeared there.

== Feral zebu rewilding attempts ==
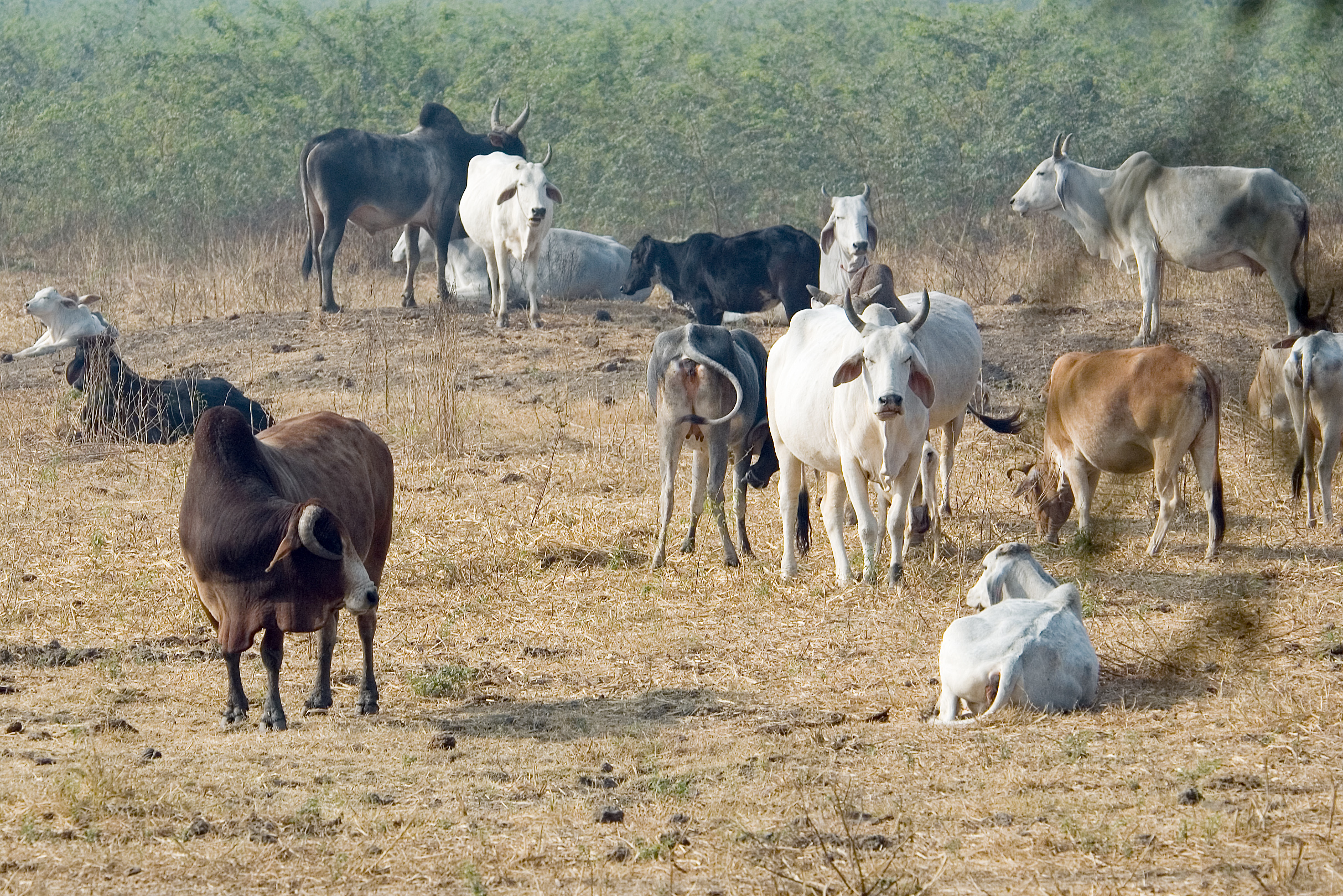
Feral zebu cattle roaming free at Keoladeo Ghana National Park, India

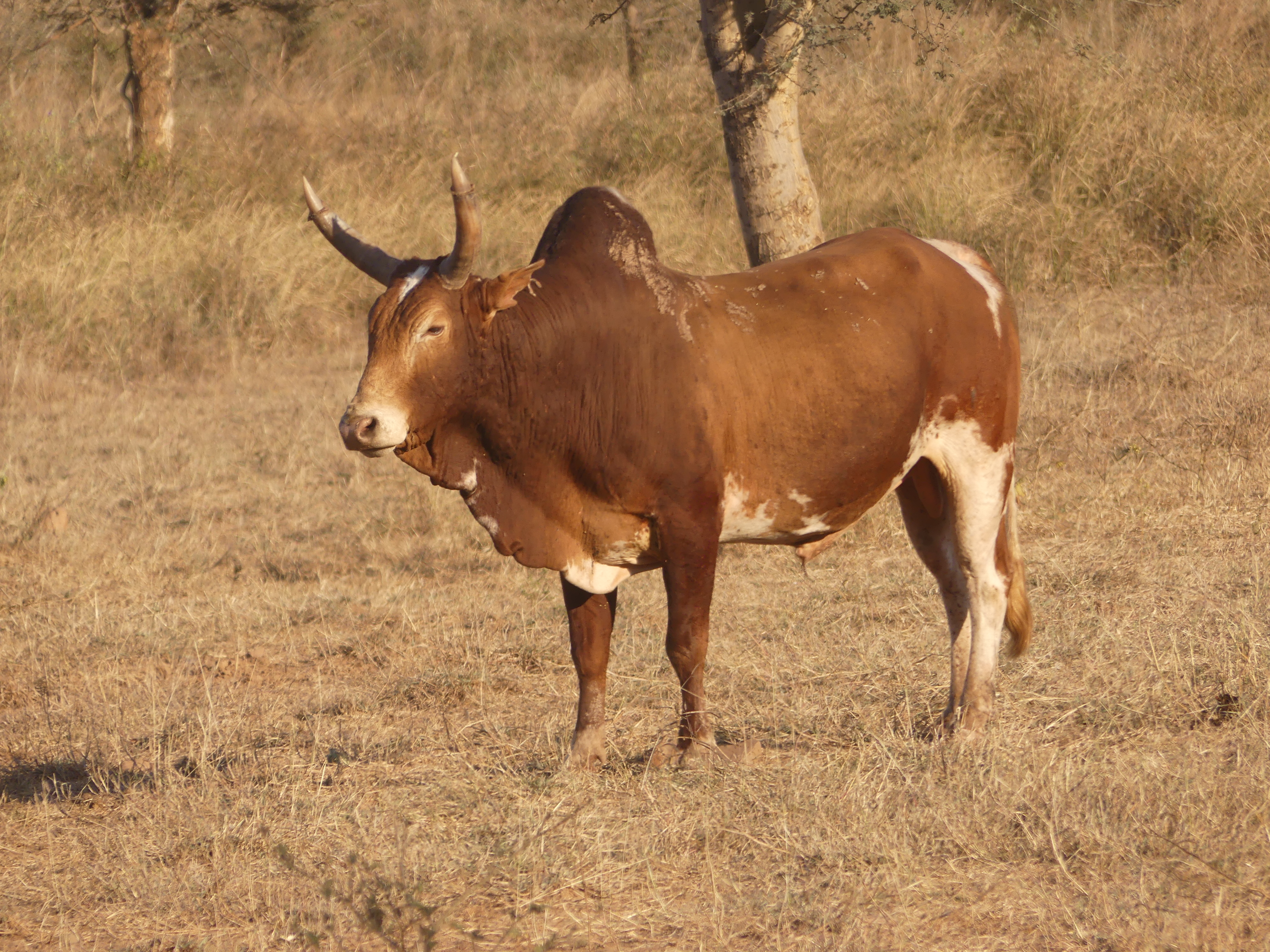
A Zebu bull in Kuno National Park, India

A feral zebu herd was initiated at Kuno Wildlife Sanctuary in Madhya Pradesh. The cattle were set free in the sanctuary to act as an attractant for the critically endangered Asiatic lion (Panthera leo persica). To the west, in the state of Gujarat, is the Asiatic lions' true last bastion, where the big cats are known to have a taste for zebu—notably in and around Gir National Park. Furthermore, the presence of the zebu within Kuno can potentially conserve and improve the entire ecosystem and landscape dramatically, as apex predators are vital to a healthy functioning ecosystem, on all levels. By attracting Asiatic lions—or possibly other rare or vulnerable predators (such as Bengal tigers, dholes, Indian wolves, or Indian leopards)—the zebu will fill the ecological niche of their prehistoric ancestors.
