= African cheetah translocation to India =

Introduction of African cheetahs in India

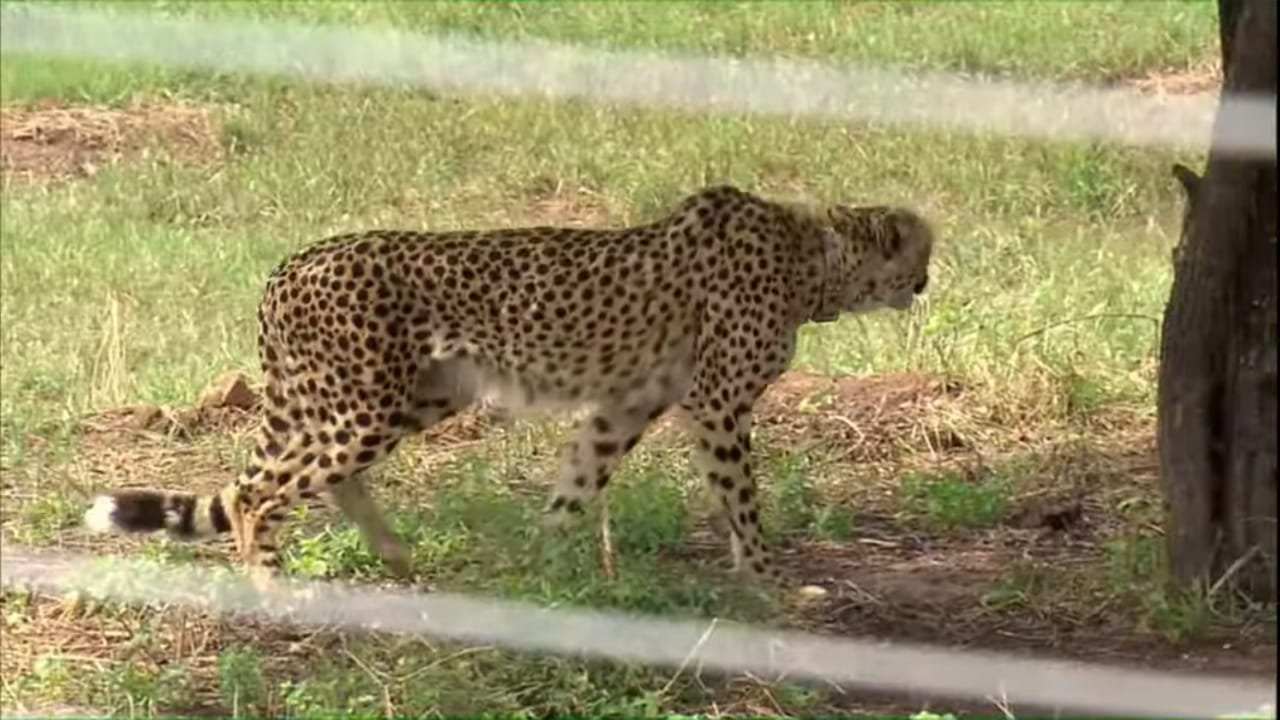
A Southeast African Cheetah inside the quarantine facility in Kuno National Park

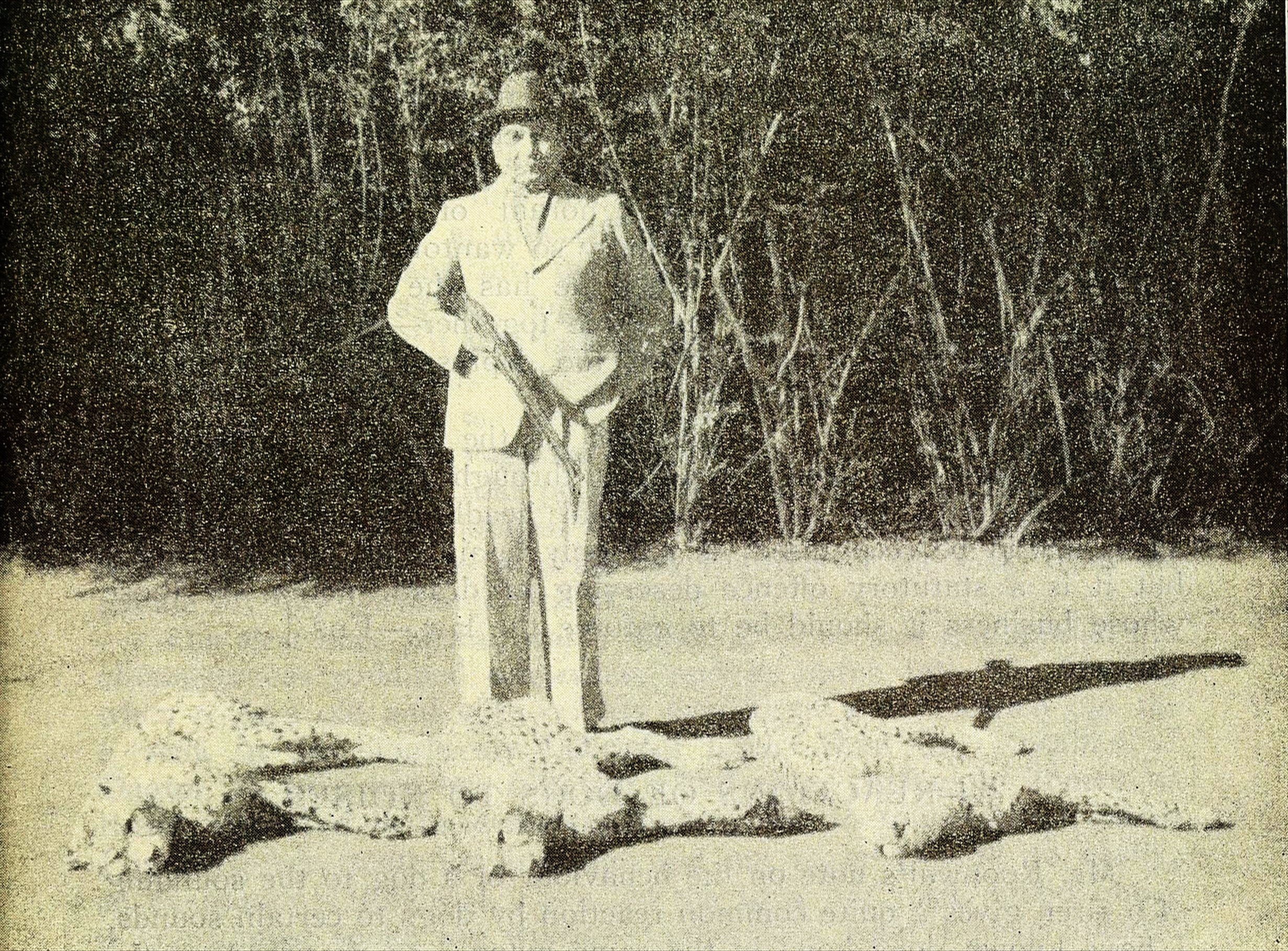
The last documented Asiatic cheetahs in India, three males from the same litter, were shot in 1947—while they were sitting together at night—by Maharajah Ramanuj Pratap Singh Deo of Surguja State, Madhya Pradesh, who poses behind them with his rifle. His private secretary provided this picture, which was communicated to the Journal of the Bombay Natural History Society on January 9, 1948.

India's native subspecies of the cheetah—the Asiatic cheetah (Acinonyx jubatus venaticus)—became extinct there in the mid-20th century. Since then, the Asiatic subspecies has survived only in Iran in critically endangered numbers. In September 2022, small numbers of Southeast African cheetah (Acinonyx jubatus jubatus), a non-native sub-species in India, were translocated from Namibia and South Africa to a national park in India. The translocation to Kuno National Park in Central India was permitted on a short-term basis by the Supreme Court of India in January 2020.

The Asiatic cheetah whose significant cultural history in India had given the Sanskrit-derived vernacular name "cheetah", or "spotted", to the species, Acinonyx jubatus, also experienced gradual habitat loss in the region. Before the thorn forests in the Punjab region—to the northwest—were cleared for agriculture and human settlement, they were intermixed with open grasslands grazed by large herds of blackbuck; these co-existed with their main natural predator, the Asiatic cheetah. In the early modern era, tame cheetahs had been kept for the pursuit of game by Indian nobility. As a result, the blackbuck is no longer a living species in the Punjab region. A combination of similar habitat loss, prey depletion, and trophy hunting during the British Raj in India led to the extinction of the Asiatic cheetah in other regions of its habitat, the last recorded killing taking place in 1947, when India was on the verge of decolonization.

Discussions on cheetah introduction began after the mid-1950s. Proposals were made to the governments of Iran in the 1970s, but unsuccessfully. Offers were made by the government of Kenya beginning in the 1980s but by 2012 the Supreme Court of India had outlawed the project for a species translocation, considering it, in addition, an "introduction" rather than a "reintroduction." In January 2020, the court reversed its 2012 decision, and allowed for the import of small numbers on an experimental basis. On 17 September 2022, five female and three male southeast African cheetahs, between the ages of four and six, were transported by air from Namibia and released in a quarantined enclosure within Kuno National Park in the state of Madhya Pradesh. The relocation was supervised by Laurie Marker, of the Namibia-based Cheetah Conservation Fund and Yadvendradev Jhala of the Wildlife Institute of India. The cheetahs, fitted with radio collars, were moved to a larger enclosure in November. A further 12 cheetahs arrived from South Africa in February 2023 and began to be released into the park in March 2023. That month a cheetah gave birth to four cubs, the first recorded live cheetah birth in India in over 70 years. The first death was reported later in the month and by January 2024, ten animals had died. (Note: While wildlife expert Vincent van der Merwe commented that cheetah deaths does not mean that the project is failing, as similar mortality rates have been reported in African reintroduction, Cheetah Conservation Fund suggested that the cheetah deaths could have been prevented with better monitoring and adequate veterinary care.)

The scientific reaction to the translocation has been mixed. Veterinary pharmacologist Adrian Tordiffe views India as providing a "protected space" for a threatened population. Zoologist K. Ullas Karanth has been critical of the effort, conjecturing that potential mortalities might require a continual import of African cheetahs. Kuno National Park is a relatively new national park fully established in 2018. Scientists have expressed concern that 20 cheetahs from Africa with typically large individual territories of 100 km^{2} (39 sq mi) might be difficult to accommodate in a park with a core zone of 748 km^{2} (289 sq mi) and a buffer zone of 487 km^{2} (188 sq mi). Increasing cheetah populations might lead to the animals venturing out of the core zones of the park into adjoining agricultural lands and non-forested areas, bringing them into conflict with humans. With this in mind, the Supreme Court of India ordered the Indian government to look for alternative parks to accommodate a potentially growing population. The African cheetahs had been projected to be a key species of a new phase of ecological restoration in India. By September 17, 2024, the second anniversary of the introduction, all surviving 12 adult cheetahs and 12 cubs were limited to protective enclosures.

== Background ==
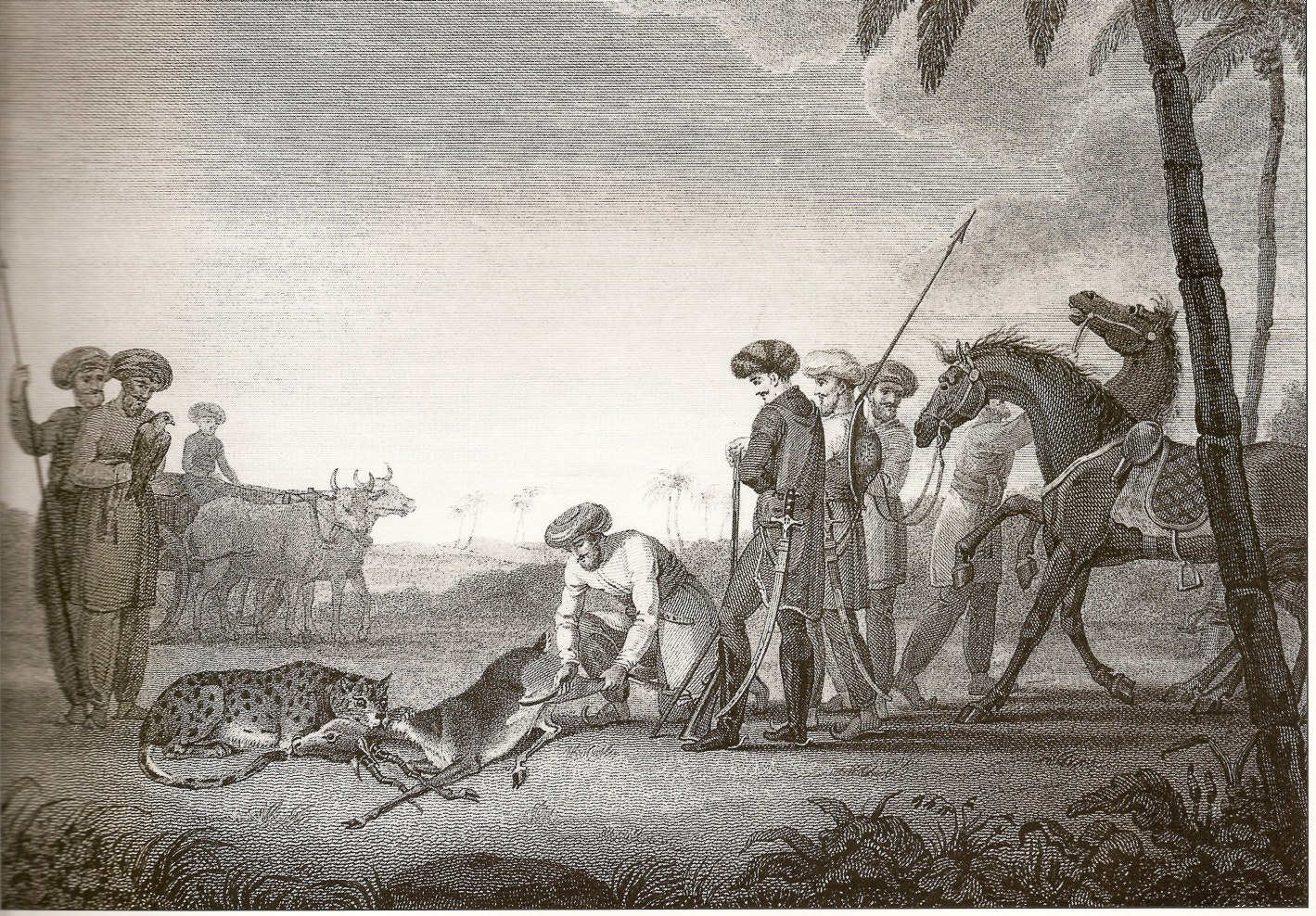
Hunting of blackbuck with Indian cheetah; Drawing by James Forbes, Oriental Memoirs, c.1812

The Asiatic cheetah (Acinonyx jubatus venaticus) once ranged from north western India to the Gangetic plain in the east, extending to the Deccan Plateau in the south. In the early modern period in India, rulers in the Mughal Empire used cheetahs for coursing blackbucks, chinkaras and antelopes. The species had a gradual history of habitat loss. In Punjab in Northern India, before the thorn forests were cleared for agriculture and human settlement, they were intermixed with open grasslands grazed by large herds of blackbuck and these co-existed with their main natural predator, the Asiatic cheetah. The blackbuck is also no longer extant in the region. Trapping of sub-adult cheetahs that have learned hunting skills from their mothers in the wild, for assisting in royal hunts is said to be the major cause of the species' rapid decline. Trophy hunting during the British Raj further impacted the already dwindling population of cheetahs. Asiatic cheetahs rarely breed in captivity as there is only one record of a litter ever born to captive animals.

By the beginning of the 20th century, wild cheetah sightings were rare in India, so much so that between 1918 and 1945, Indian princes imported cheetahs from Africa for coursing. The last confirmed three cheetahs were shot by Maharajah of Surguja Ramanuj Pratap Singh Deo in 1948. The last known sighting was that of a female in 1951 in Koriya district in northwestern Chhattisgarh. With the death of the last known population and no further sightings, the species was declared locally extinct in 1952. The Asiatic subspecies is now found only in Iran and is declared as critically endangered.

== Early re-introduction plans ==
In 1955, the State Wildlife Board of Andhra Pradesh suggested the reintroduction of the Asiatic cheetah on an experimental basis in two districts of the state. In the 1970s, the Ministry of Environment, Forest and Climate Change of Government of India formally wrote to the Iranian government requesting Asiatic cheetahs for reintroduction and received a positive response. The talks stalled after the Iranian Revolution. In 1984, wildlife conservationist Divyabhanusinh wrote a paper on the subject on the request of Ministry of Environment and Forests, which was subsequently sent to the Cat Specialist Group of Species Survival Commission of the IUCN. In the late 1980s, Government of Kenya reportedly offered to send a few members of related sub-species Southeast African cheetah (Acinonyx jubatus jubatus).

During the early 2000s, scientists from the Centre for Cellular and Molecular Biology (CCMB), Hyderabad, proposed a plan to clone Asiatic cheetahs from Iran. In August 2009, talks were rekindled with Iran for sharing a few of the animals. The dwindling population of the species in the existent range made Iran hesitant to commit to the idea. Iran proposed that Asiatic lions which are existent only in India be given in exchange for cheetahs for which India refused and the plan to source cheetahs from Iran was eventually dropped in 2010.

== Project Cheetah ==
=== Project formulation ===
Location of the sites which were under consideration for the project. The chosen site is marked in green.

In September 2009, a workshop was organised in Gajnar, Rajasthan, to discuss the appropriateness of relocating some African cheetahs to India. Experts differed in their views, and the Environment Minister, Jairam Ramesh, was cautious, saying more study was required.

=== Legal troubles and clearance ===
In May 2012, the Supreme Court of India put the project of importing cheetahs from Africa and reintroducing them in India on hold after a petition was filed against the same. In the petition, it was argued that Kuno, the proposed location for the re-introduction was prepared for reintroduction of native lions from Gir National Park and introducing cheetahs will be used as a pretext to delay the lion re-introduction project. It was also argued that the reintroduction of African cheetah has not been placed before the Standing Committee of India's National Board for Wildlife and that the scientific studies show the African cheetahs to be genetically different from Asian Cheetahs which is against the International Union for the Conservation of Nature (IUCN) guidelines on translocation of wildlife species.

On 28 January 2020, the Supreme Court allowed the central government to proceed with the introduction of Southern African cheetahs to a suitable habitat in India as part of a trial, in response to an application filed by the National Tiger Conservation Authority (NTCA) seeking permission to introduce Southern African cheetahs from Namibia. The Supreme Court set up a three-member committee to guide the NTCA and asked the committee to submit a progress report every four months. Subsequently, a scientific assessment of all potential reintroduction sites was conducted to understand the habitat conditions, prey species availability, protection status and other ecological criteria for shortlisting initial introduction site with a detailed scientific action plan published in January 2022. In August 2022, the Union minister of Environment stated that African cheetahs would be reintroduced from Namibia to Kuno Wildlife Sanctuary in September and that the Indian Government was also attempting to trans locate another 12 cheetahs from South Africa.

=== African cheetah translocation ===
On 17 September 2022, five female and three male southeast African cheetahs, between the ages of four and six, were flown in from Namibia and released in a quarantined enclosure within the Kuno National Park. The cheetahs were fitted with radio collars, and were planned to be retained in quarantined enclosures for a month, followed by the release of males (and later the females) into the park. The relocation was supervised by Yadvendradev Jhala of the Wildlife Institute of India and zoologist Laurie Marker, of the Namibia-based Cheetah Conservation Fund. Subsequently, plans were made for flying in 12 cheetahs from South Africa and scaling up to 40 individuals. In November 2022, the cheetahs were shifted to a larger enclosure for further adaption after their mandatory quarantine period. In January 2023, following the signing of the agreement between South Africa and India, a first batch of 12 cheetahs arrived next month. The agreement between both countries involved South Africa relocating a further 12 cheetahs every year for the next eight to ten years.

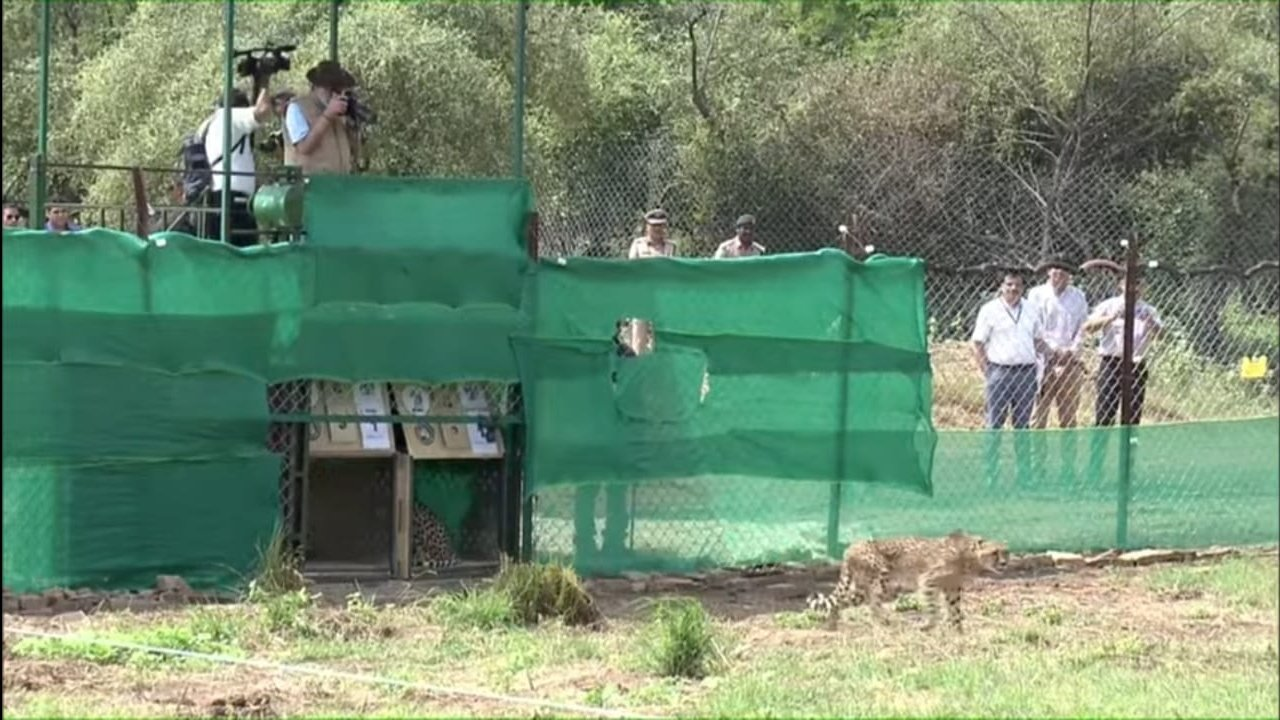
The first cheetah being introduced into the park

On 11 March 2023, a male and a female were released together into the wild and were confirmed to have successfully hunted prey in the park. In the subsequent weeks, further cheetahs were released into the wild and the released animals were tracked by radio collars. Later in the month, a female died due to kidney complications. On April 24, another cheetah death was reported due to heart failure. In May, three more animals were released into the wild. Following the death of three cheetah cubs, the Central government appointed a high-level steering committee, comprising national and international experts, to oversee the implementation on May 25.

In May 2023, South African wildlife expert Vincent van der Merwe clarified that recent cheetah deaths does not mean that the Project Cheetah is failing, as similar mortality rates have been reported in African reintroduction and 50 percent mortality rate is expected in the first year. In July 2023, Namibia-based Cheetah Conservation Fund wrote a letter to the Supreme Court of India, suggesting that the cheetah deaths could have been prevented with better monitoring and adequate veterinary care. It was based on the postmortem reports which indicated that cheetahs had died of various causes including starvation and infection due to wounds made by the tracking radio collar. By January 2024, three more deaths were recorded pushing the count of dead animals to ten since the start of the project. As of September 2024, the remaining 12 animals were moved to enclosures due to the apparent mortality.

=== Breeding ===
One of the released cheetahs, gave birth to four cubs on 24 March 2023, the first recorded live cheetah birth in over 70 years. On 9 May 2023, a female was killed during a fight with a male cheetah during mating. Following the incident, wildlife experts raised concerns on the sex ratio of the cats in the park and suggested that adequate number of animals of both sexes in the breeding age are required for successful breeding. Three cubs were born in January and a further six cubs were born in March 2024, raising the total number of cheetahs in the national park to 27.

=== Sustainability and impact ===
The scientific reaction to the translocation has been mixed. Veterinary pharmacologist Adrian Tordiffe viewed India as providing a "protected space" for the fragmented and threatened cheetah population. Zoologist K. Ullas Karanth was critical of the effort, considering it to be a "public relations exercise." He further commented that the "realities" such as human overpopulation, and the presence of larger feline predators and packs of feral dogs, could cause potentially "high mortalities," and require a continual import of African cheetahs.

Kuno National Park is a relatively new national park, having declared as such in 2018. It was founded previously as a wildlife sanctuary to implement the Asiatic Lion Reintroduction Project, which aimed to establish a second Asiatic lion population in India and protect the isolated lions of the Gir National Park in Gujarat from potential mass mortality events such as an outbreak of an epizootic. Although the state government of Gujarat was ordered by the Supreme Court in April 2013 to transfer a small population of lions to Kuno within six months, the order was not ultimately impleented. It was estimated that Kuno National Park had adequate prey population to support about 20 cheetahs. With an increase in the predator population due to the introduction of cheetahs, prey population has been impacted and periodic studies of prey population is being conducted to take required corrective action.

Scientists from Namibia have indicated concern on the spatial ecology. Cheetahs in Africa typically have individual territories of 100 km^{2} (39 sq mi) and it will be difficult to sustain 20 cheetahs at Kuno National Park with a core zone of 748 km^{2} (289 sq mi) and a buffer zone of 487 km^{2} (188 sq mi). Increasing cheetah population leads to the animals venturing out of the core zones of the park into adjoining agricultural lands and non-forested areas, bringing them into conflict with humans. On 2 April 2023, a male cheetah escaped from the boundaries of the park before being captured in a village 20 km (12 mi) from the park. In the same month, the Supreme Court of India ordered the central government to look for an alternative site to augment the existing facility as the park did not have an adequate amount of space for the growing number of felines. According to Ravi Chellam, the introduced African cheetahs had been projected to be a key species of a new phase of ecological restoration in India, comprising scrub forests, savannahs and grasslands. By September 17, 2024, the second anniversary of the introduction—at first of eight adults from Namibia and thereafter 12 from South Africa; subsequent deaths of eight adults; births of 17 cubs; and deaths of five—all surviving 12 adults cheetahs and 12 cubs were limited to protective enclosures.
