= Asiatic Lion Reintroduction Project =

Initiative to prevent extinction of Asiatic lions

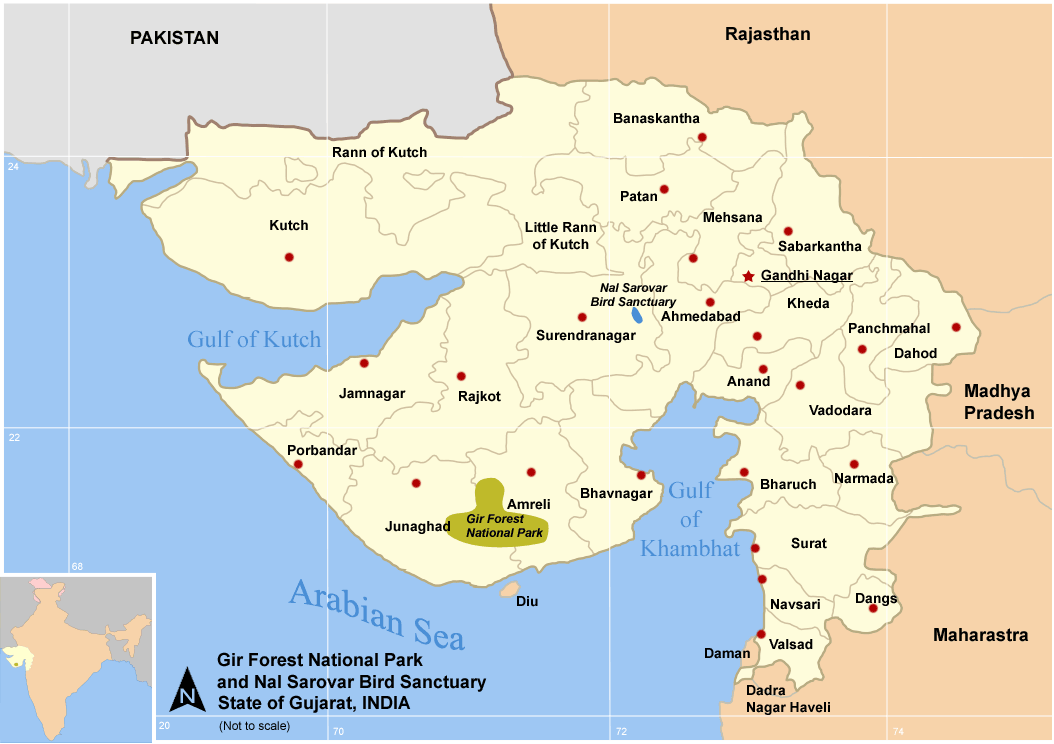
The Gir Forest in the State of Gujarat, India is the last natural habitat of more than 674 wild Asiatic lions, though plans are afoot to re-introduce some to Kuno National Park in the neighboring State of Madhya Pradesh to ensure their longterm survival against epidemics and natural calamities.

The Asiatic Lion Reintroduction Project is an initiative of the Indian Government to provide safeguards to the Asiatic lion (Panthera leo leo) (Note: In 2017, due to the Asiatic lion's close relationship with the Barbary lion, the Cat Classification Taskforce of the Cat Specialist Group subsumed P. l. persica to P. l. leo.) from extinction in the wild by means of reintroduction. The last wild population of the Asiatic lion is found in the region of Gir Forest National Park, in the state of Gujarat. The single population faces the threats of epidemics, natural disasters and other anthropogenic factors. The project aims to establish a second independent population of Asiatic lions at the Kuno National Park in the Indian state of Madhya Pradesh. However, the proposed translocation has been resisted by the Gujarat state government.

== History ==
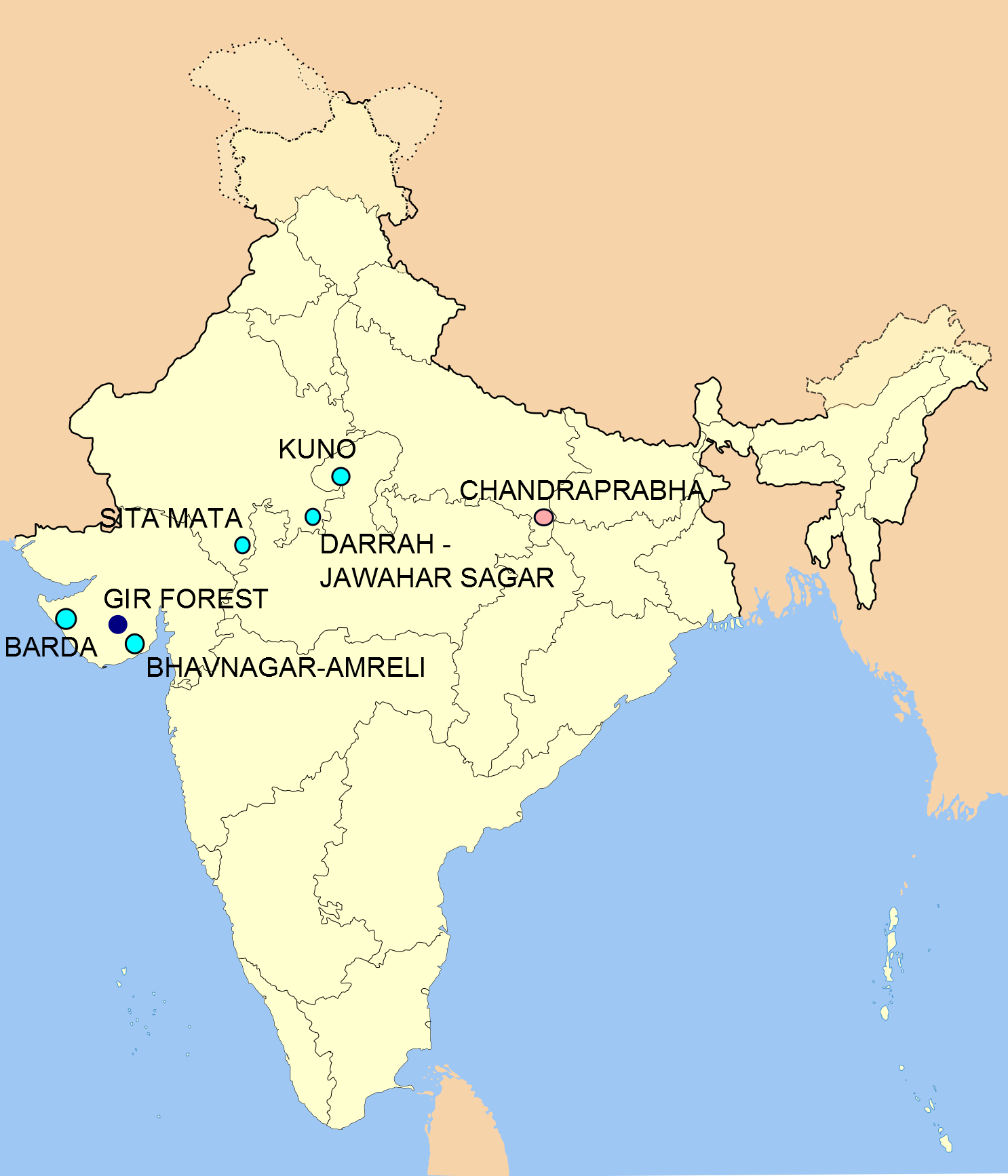
Historical and proposed lion reintroduction sites in India

The distribution of Asiatic lion was once found widely in West and South Asia. In the nineteenth century, hunting by British officials and Indian rulers caused the lion to dwindle to a single population in the Gir Forest National Park and Wildlife Sanctuary in India. The population at Gir declined to 18 individuals in 1893 but increased due to protection and conservation efforts to 284 in 1994. The Gir Wildlife Sanctuary is now highly overpopulated with lions, the 2015 census showed the strength to be 523 lions. There are numerous deaths in the population annually because of increasing competition between human and animal overcrowding. Asiatic lion prides require large territories but there is limited space at Gir wildlife sanctuary, which is boxed in on all sides by heavy human habitation. Gir lions have started moving outwards from the sanctuary and establishing homes outside the protected areas. The lions are now spread over 16,000 square kilometres (6,200 sq mi) in the vicinity of 1050 villages in four contiguous districts - Amreli, Gir Somnath, Bhavnagar and Junagadh.

=== Sheopur Introduction of 1904 ===
The Maharaja of Gwalior, on being encouraged by Lord Curzon in 1904, imported cubs of African lions and attempted to introduce them into the wild in the forests near Sheopur. The introduced lions took to raiding livestock and some even turned to man-eating, subsequent to which they were all eventually tracked down and shot.

=== The Chandraprabha Relocation of 1957 ===
The concept of reintroduction for purposes of conservation was accepted in 1956 by the Indian Wildlife Board during a meeting of their executive committee at Sasan Gir and the offer by the state government of Uttar Pradesh to host a second population in the Chakia forests was accepted. In 1956 one lion and two lionesses were captured from Gir, placed in the Sakkarbuagh Zoo in Junagadh for nine months and then translocated in 1957 to the 96 square kilometres (37 sq mi) Chandra Prabha Sanctuary, near Varanasi in Uttar Pradesh and newly established for the reintroduction. An enclosure was created with a 3 metres (9.8 ft) high barbed wire fence within the sanctuary in which the lions were temporarily housed before being released in the sanctuary. Initially the lions prospered increasing in number to four in 1958, five in 1960, seven in 1962 and eleven in 1965 after which the population died out inexplicably.

Johnsingh (2006) attributes the failure of the translocation to three causes – inadequate area, lack of systematic monitoring using scientific techniques and unrestricted movement of grazing animals throughout the sanctuary possibly leading to conflict with herders. Small size of area, the long period of captivity in Junagadh zoo, absence of education of the local villagers and lack of conflict resolution mechanisms are also listed as contributory factors in Chellam and Johnsingh (1999).

=== The Wildlife Institute of India initiative ===
The Wildlife Institute of India (WII) began studying the Asiatic lion in its habitat in from 1986 onwards and collected fundamental data about the lion, its feeding, use of habitat and ranging habits. Key findings of the study were that the lions largely preyed upon wild herbivores such as sambar (Rusa unicolor) and chital (Axis axis) and that the size of home range was 70 square kilometres (27 sq mi) for females and 140 square kilometres (54 sq mi) for the males. In 1990, the WII proposed the creation of a second wild population of Asiatic lions to safeguard the species against potential calamities in Gujarat's Gir National Park.

=== Project Lion ===
Project Lion is an Indian government initiative to conserve the Asiatic lion species that was announced on 15 August 2020 during the 74th independence day celebrations by Indian prime minister Narendra Modi. It will be under the Ministry of Environment, Forest and Climate Change and is modelled on the lines of Project Tiger. The project has established three "gene pool" sites at Rampara in Saurashtra, and Sakkarbaug and Satveerada in Junagadh for the purpose of breeding the lions. One of the aims of the project is to address human-wildlife conflict between local residents and the lions. The project has also identified six new potential sites of reintroduction of the species in the country.

The six new potential sites are:

- Madhav National Park, Madhya Pradesh
- Sitamata Wildlife Sanctuary, Rajasthan
- Mukundra Hills Tiger Reserve, Rajasthan
- Gandhi Sagar Wildlife Sanctuary, Madhya Pradesh
- Kumbhalgarh Wildlife Sanctuary, Rajasthan
- Jessore-Balaram Ambaji WLS and adjoining landscape, Gujarat

== 1993 PHVA report ==
In 1993, a workshop was held on the Population and Habitat Viability Assessment (PHVA) of Asiatic lion and the report was presented to the state forest departments in Vadodara, Gujarat. State forest departments were asked to suggest suitable sites for reintroduction and provide the basic ecological data.

During the workshop, a number of teams were formed to focus on varied aspects of the conservation biology of the Asiatic lion such as monitoring, habitat (further subdivided into Gujarat, Madhya Pradesh and Rajasthan sub-groups), population modelling, prey-base requirements, lion-human interactions, translocation, captive zoo animals, public education, veterinary, reproductive and genetic aspects etc.

The sites were assessed and ranked for suitability as follows:

- Kuno Wildlife Sanctuary - found most suitable for reintroduction.
- Sita Mata Wildlife Sanctuary - later rejected due to human interference and inadequate prey population.
- Darrah - Jawahar Sagar Wildlife Sanctuary - later rejected due to degraded habitat and unsuitable geography.
- Kumbhalgarh Wildlife Sanctuary - assessed as having limited area, unsuitable terrain, limited water and prey base as well as disturbance.
- Barda Wildlife Sanctuary - assessed as having scarcity of water, prey and forage, as well as encroachment and disturbance.

The PHVA report strongly favoured the scientific management of reintroduction of Asiatic lions to another site:

The overwhelming consensus of the Workshop was that an alternative habitat for the Asiatic lion must be established with all possible speed, but without compromise of the accepted strategies and principles governing systematic and scientific reintroduction. This should be done simultaneously with strengthening effective protection and management of the Gir Forest and assuring the viability of the captive population and alternative genetic resources.

The PHVA deliberations were followed by visits to the three most promising site, viz Kuno, Darrah-Jawaharsagar and Sitamata WLS by a survey team of WII headed by Dr Ravi Chellam. The team evaluated sites over various parameters and compared the same with respect to Gir Forest for determining the suitability of sites. They presented their findings in 1995 to the Government of India and the state forest departments. WII researchers confirmed that the Palpur-Kuno Wildlife Sanctuary was the most promising location to re-establish a free ranging population of the Asiatic lions and in 2007 certified it ready to receive its first batch of translocated lions.

== Project framework ==
The framework of the Lion Introduction Project emerged from the transformation of a Monitoring Committee, set up by the Government of India, which met on 10 March 2004 for effective implementation of the reintroduction at Kuno.

At the meeting the WII Site Survey was examined and it was understood that Kuno Palpur Sanctuary was the most suitable site for reintroduction. The Committee formulated a three phase framework for the conservation project to last for two decades as follows :

- During the first phase, slated from 1995 to 2000, the 24 villages would be shifted out of the sanctuary and the habitat would be improved.
- The second phase would last from 2000 to 2005 and would include fencing off of the lion reintroduction site, the actual trans-location, as well as research and monitoring.
- The final phase III would last from 2005 to 2015 and would focus on eco-development of the region.

At that point in time, the project was in Phase II and 18 of the 24 villages had been rehabilitated from Kuno. The refusal of Gujarat state to provide lions was mentioned during this meeting by the Chief Wildlife Warden of Gujarat. A number of steps were approved with consensus which included the engaging of the Gujarat State Government as to the necessity of the project, preparation of a trans-location road map, fresh assessment of prey base of Kuno by WII and continued funding support for welfare measures and habitat improvement for the existing fauna at Kuno.

== Lion reintroduction at Kuno National Park ==
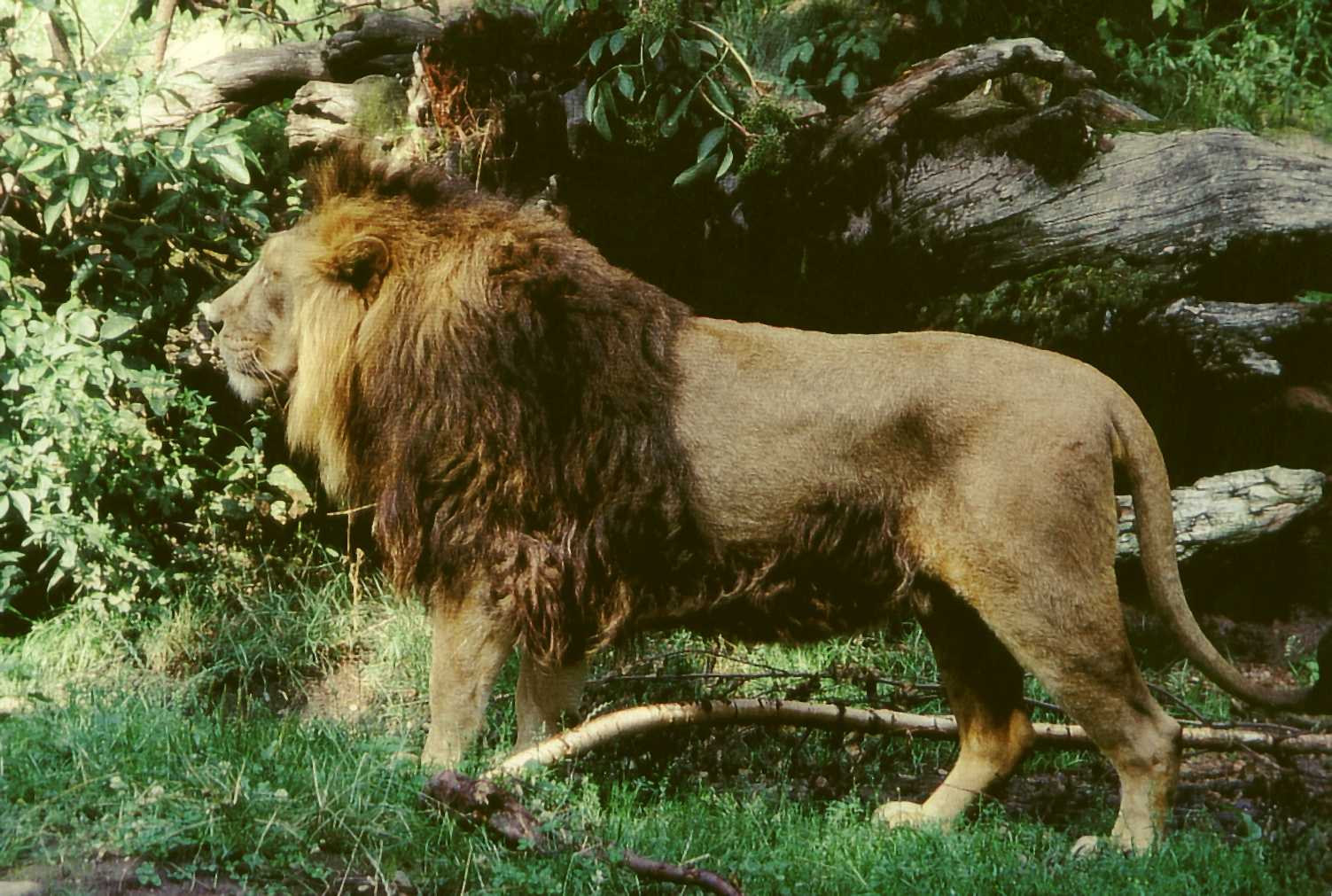
A male Asiatic lion

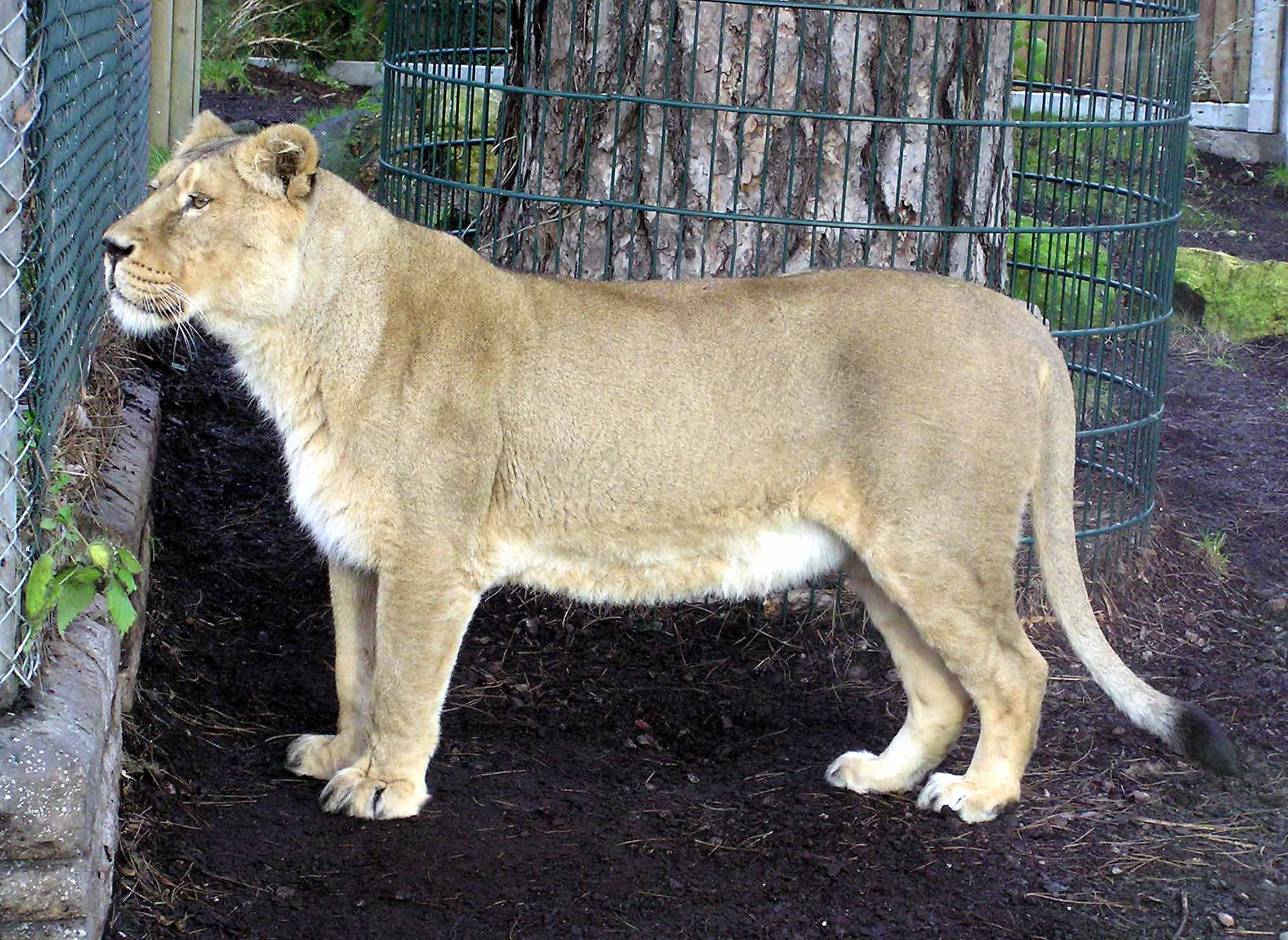
Asiatic lioness, named MOTI, at Bristol Zoo, England (1996)

=== Establishing the wildlife sanctuary ===
The Madhya Pradesh state forest department notified 345 square kilometres (133 sq mi) of the Kuno Palpur area as a Wildlife Sanctuary in 1981. In April 2002, a separate Wildlife Division was established for Kuno, effectively increasing the protected area for wildlife to 1,268.861 square kilometres (489.910 sq mi).

=== Rehabilitation of villagers ===
Twenty four villages of the Sahariya tribe, comprising 1545 families, were moved out from the core area and rehabilitated by the state government with assistance from the Central Government. Due to a paucity of suitable revenue lands in the vicinity of Kuno, the state government proposed relocating the villages on degraded protected forests, a move approved by the Ministry of Environment and Forests (MOEF) of the Government of India, which granted its approval under Section 2 of the Forest (Conservation) Act 1980 for diversion of 3,395.9 hectares (8,391 acres). By 2002–2003, all 24 villages and the identified families were relocated outside Kuno and the former village area converted into grasslands.

The Madhya Pradesh state government informed the Supreme Court that each family was given 2 hectares (4.9 acres) of cultivable land, in addition to 500 square metres (600 sq yd) for housing along with building constructional material costing Rs 1,00,000/- per house. The net outflow to the Central Government was Rs.15 crores.

Major gaps remain in the implementation of the rehabilitation measures, with villagers alleging that they have got little of the rehabilitation package they were promised. The negative economic impact of the displacement to villagers from Kuno sanctuary has raised a controversy over the merits of species preservation via dislocation of human populations living inside Protected Areas. NGOs, such as the Samrakshan Trust, have been working for better rehabilitation of villagers who agreed to move out of the Kuno Wildlife Sanctuary.

== Opposition by the Gujarat Government ==
In 2004, the state government refused to part with the first pride of 19 animals planned for relocation. The state considers the lions as "heritage of the state" and the issue of handing over lions has become a political issue. Mangubhai Patel, then State Forest Minister, went on record to state that:

There is no need to shift lions from Gir. We will ensure their survival here.

As early as 2009, the continued opposition of the Gujarat state government led to the Madhya Pradesh Forest Department's exploration of the possibility of procuring zoo-bred Asiatic lions and shifting them and their descendants to Palpur-Kuno.

The Gujarat state government has, over time, made various arguments against translocating lions to Madhya Pradesh (MP), such as that the Kuno sanctuary was not suitable lion habitat and that it had inadequate prey base, that MP had been unable to provide adequate protection to tigers in its Panna National Park and the lions if reintroduced there would be in danger, that the proposed introduction of Southern African cheetahs to Kuno rendered it unsuitable for lion reintroduction.

The Gujarat State Wildlife Department proposed new homes for lions in the Barda Wildlife Sanctuary and Bhavnagar Amreli Forest instead. Gir's lions have spread beyond the protective area and the measures of the state to engage this phenomenon are being portrayed as providing adequate dispersal to the lion population to prevent disease. Gujarat also played an emotional card by declaring before the Supreme Court that the lion was inextricably bound to the culture of Gujarat and that it was a "family member", hence could not be provided for translocation to Kuno.

This stand of Gujarat suffered a setback when on 15 April 2013, the Supreme Court of India acknowledged translocation to Kuno as being in the best interest of the species and rejected the Gujarat Government's objections, instead ordering the translocation to be carried out within six months. A bandh was called in the villages adjoining the Sasan Gir region on 18 April 2013 protesting the Supreme Court decision.

== Supreme Court verdict and aftermath ==
In light of the State Government of Gujarat's refusal to permit the reintroduction of Asiatic lions, a writ petition was filed in 1995 by the Centre for Environment Law and WWF-I in the Indian Supreme Court to get the Gujarat State Government to release a few prides of Asiatic lions for the Kuno Wildlife Sanctuary. The Indian Supreme Court fast-tracked the case and delivered a judgement on 16 April 2013 permitting the reintroduction of lions to Kuno, over-ruling the objections of the Gujarat Government.

The Gujarat Government filed on 1 July 2013 for a review in the Supreme Court of its 16 April ruling. In its petition, the Gujarat state government claimed that "top carnivores have never been successfully translocated". The state has put forward the argument that translocation would break social bonds between members of groups or prides, which are vital for lion survival. The reported presence of tiger cubs in Palpur-Kuno was emphasised, saying that it could result in conflict between these top predators. The state proposed, instead, a second home for lions within Gujarat itself, claiming it would have numerous advantages including being in tune with international guidelines. The continued reluctance of the state to part with lions for translocation has come under criticism from prominent environmentalists.

Post the verdict, fears have been voiced by Gujarati environmentalists over the gun culture of Madhya Pradesh and number of firearms in Sheopur, the region where the Kuno Palpur sanctuary is located and it is suggested that translocation to such an area would be in violation of IUCN norms on the subject. With the release of IUCN guidelines on translocation, opponents of the project have cited from the provisions and also claimed that the history of translocations especially in India is dismal and hence translocation is not favoured. The natural spread of over-populated lions from an original range of over 1,412 square kilometres (545 sq mi) to an area extending over 10,500 square kilometres (4,100 sq mi), is considered to mitigate against the risk of epidemic disease.

The Gujarat government's curative petition against relocation of the wild Asiatic lions from the Gir Forest to Madhya Pradesh was dismissed by the Supreme Court on 14 August 2014. In the face of continued opposition, the Madhya Pradesh government is considering an alternate plan to release zoo-bred lions from Hyderabad and Sakkarbaug, a move which has been criticised in the light of the deaths of two newly translocated zoo-bred lions in the safari park at Etawah, Uttar Pradesh. After the dismissal of the Gujarat State petition, two NGOs from Gujarat have filed separate petitions against the translocation order, one on the grounds that certain relevant facts have not been brought to the notice of the apex court, the other stating that the importance of Kuno-Palpur as a corridor for migrating tigers between Ranthambore National Park in Rajasthan and Madhav National Park in Madhya Pradesh had been downplayed.

Despite supreme court's order, the Gujarat Government has resisted lion relocation to Kuno National Park since 2013. In September 2022, South African cheetah were arrived from Namibia to Kuno National Park for cheetah reintroduction plan.

== Translocation plan within Gujarat ==
The plan is to reintroduce a pride or two of wild, free-ranging Asiatic lions from Gir Forest in the neighboring parts of the Indian state of Gujarat to start with.

In compliance with the Supreme Court order of 15 April 2013, the Ministry of Environment and Forests has constituted a panel for deciding the best course of action in translocation of animals to Gir. The panel comprises 12 members including member secretary National Tiger Conservation Authority, the Chief Wildlife Wardens of Gujarat and Madhya Pradesh, member Wildlife Institute of India, and scientists Drs Ravi Chellam, Y.V. Jhala, NK Ranjeet Singh and PR Sinha. The panel will advise both the states on technical aspect of translocation, decide the composition of animals to be translocated, select the prides and animals, supervise the translocation, monitor it and periodically report to the Ministry. During the first deliberations on 29 July 2013, the panel acceded the need to follow the recent IUCN translocation guidelines but brushed aside Gujarat's objections against the process. A two-member team comprising Dr Ravi Chellam and Dr Y.V. Jhala has been set up to decide the translocation protocol and report within six weeks.

Gujarat objected to meeting of the 12-member panel on 29 July 2013 before its petition had been reviewed and also to the presence of tiger experts on the panel, claiming that lion experts from Gujarat had been ignored, however that petition was rejected by the Supreme Court.

In a further development, in April 2015, the Union government has admitted that Madhya Pradesh will have to enlarge the wildlife sanctuary's size, from 349 square kilometres (135 sq mi) to 700 square kilometres (270 sq mi) in order to implement the translocation of the Asiatic lions to Kuno-Palpur from Gujarat's Sasan Gir, a suggestion made in the original project report. This is the first time that the Government of India has accepted that the sanctuary needs to be enlarged. However, the expansion would require the relocation of several big villages, a move the Madhya Pradesh government is not keen to undertake. The Madhya Pradesh Forest Department is of the view that the present sanctuary area and its buffer total over 700 km^{2} and are therefore adequate, but have made no mention of notifying the buffer zone area also as a sanctuary.

In a reversal of position, the Ministry of Environment and Forests decided in a meeting in June 2015 against translocation at present on the grounds that it would be detrimental to the breeding and survival of the lions as they lived in social prides. The turn-around of stance has been attributed by environmentalists supporting the translocation to Narendra Modi who had as Chief Minister of Gujarat stated that the lion was the pride of Gujarat and had publicly declared his opposition to the transfer of lions outside the state.

== See also ==
- Wildlife conservation
- Reintroduction
- in-situ conservation
- Ex-situ conservation
- List of Protected areas in India
- International Union for Conservation of Nature (IUCN)
- Extinction
- Indian Council of Forestry Research and Education
- Iran's Project Lion
- Cheetah reintroduction in India
