= Vikramsinh =

Vikramsinh is a given name. Notable people with the name include:

- Vikramsinh Patankar
- Vikramsinh Balasaheb Sawant
- Yadvendradev Vikramsinh Jhala
