= Kuno River =

River in India

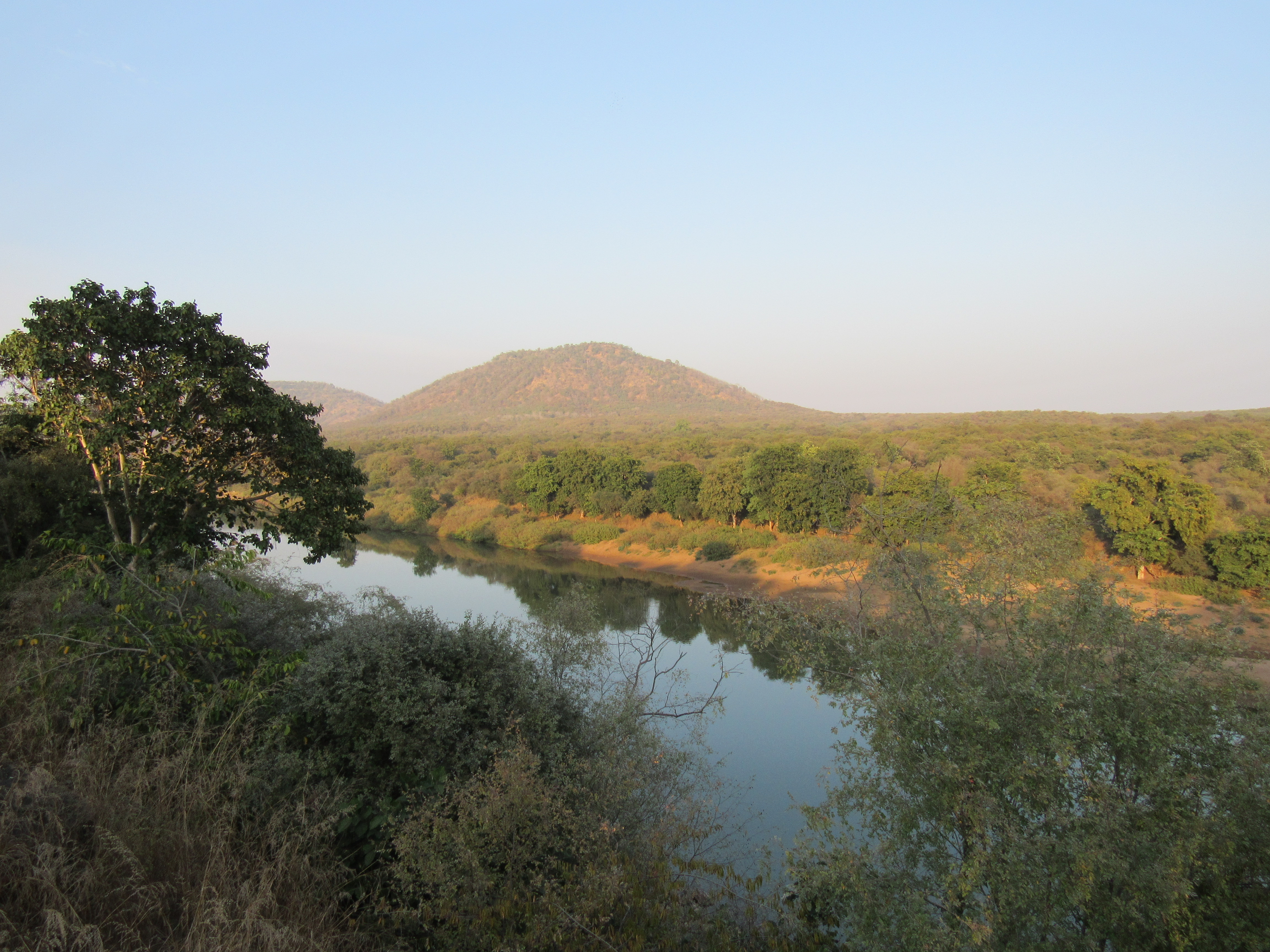
Kuno river in Kuno National Park

The Kuno River is a river that flows through the Kuno National Park from South to north in the Indian state of Madhya Pradesh. The river is a lifeline for the sanctuary's diverse flora and fauna. It passes through district like Guna, Shivpuri, Baran, Sheopur and Morena. It joins Chambal River in Morena district. 25 gharials were released in the Kuno River in Morena District. Sand mining in the river has diminished the number of this crocodile species.
