= Bhavnagar Amreli Forest =

Bhavnagar Amreli Forest is a reserved area for conservation of Asiatic lions. The new location is on the eastern side of Gir National Park in Amreli district of Gujarat. After inclusion of New Jesal sanctuary the area of this forest will go to 1600 km^{2} which is bigger than Gir sanctuary. The Gujarat state government insisted on shifting the lions to this forest claiming that lions were pride of Gujarat. However the central government is pressuring Gujarat state government to shift some lions in Kuno Wildlife Sanctuary. There are almost 110 lions outside the protected area in Gir forest. A pride of about 20 lions will be introduced in three different area in this forest. A large number of lions have been wiped out of Tanzania's Serengeti National Park. To prevent this from happing at Gir forest, Gujarat state government has proposed this habitat.

Distribution of Asiatic lions according to 2010 census:

District	Male	Female	Cubs	Total
Amreli	28	40	40	108
Bhavnagar	11	11	11	33
Junagarh	58	111	101	270
Total	97	162	152	411

According to above table 141 lions live in Bhavnagar and Amreli districts.
