= Korea State =

Princely state in the British Empire of India

Coordinates: 23°44′N 81°49′E

Korea State Koriya State
- State under the Maratha Confederacy (1790–1818); Protectorate under British India (1818–1890); Princely State under the British Raj (1890-1947)
- 16th century–1947
- Flag

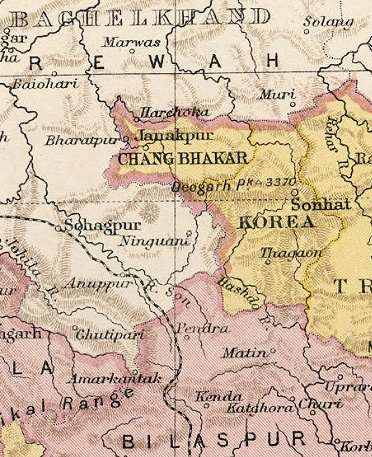
- Korya State in the Imperial Gazetteer of India
- Area
  - 1941: 4,224 km^{2} (1,631 sq mi)
- Population
  - 1941: 126,874
- Government
- Raja
  - 1795–1824: Gharib Singh Deo
  - 1909–1947: Ramanuj Pratap Singh Deo
- History
  - Established: 16th century
  - Independence of India: 1947
Succeeded by
India
- Today part of: Koriya district, Chhattisgarh
- Columbia-Lippincott Gazetteer. (New York: Columbia University Press, 1952) p. 369

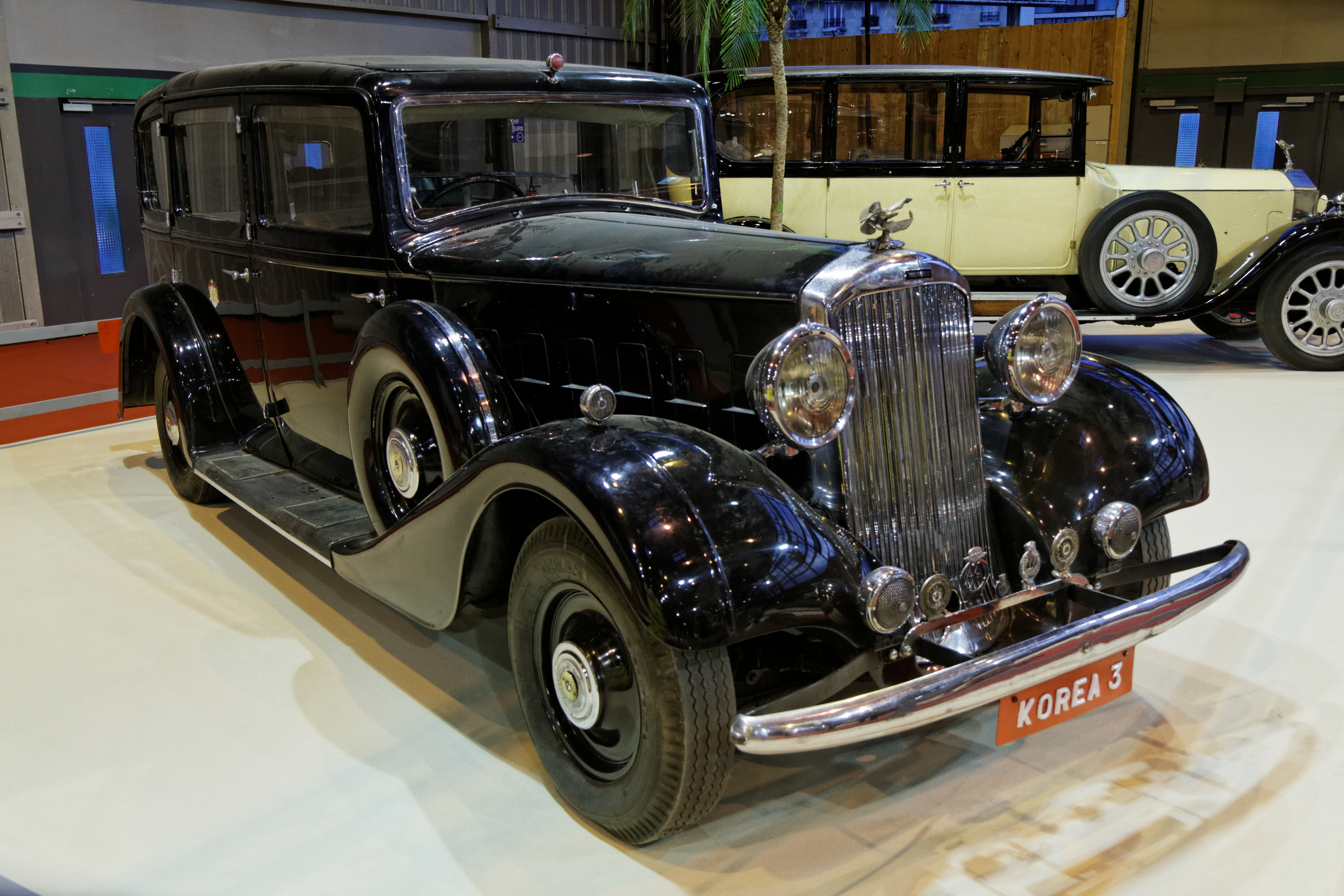
Car of Raja Ramanuj Pratap Singh Deo, a Humber with landaulette body by Thrupp & Maberly, 1932

Korea State, currently spelt as Koriya, was a Rajput princely state in the Empire of India. It was founded in the 16th century by the Chauhan dynasty. After Indian independence in 1947, the ruler of Korea acceded to the Union of India on 1 January 1948, and Koriya was made part of Surguja District of Central Provinces and Berar province. In January 1950, "Central Provinces and Berar" province was renamed Madhya Pradesh state. After November 2000, Korea and the former princely state of Changbhakar became Koriya district of Chhattisgarh state.

Korea had an area of 1,631 square miles (4,220 km^{2}) and a population of 126,874 as of 1941.

== Location ==
The state of Korea, which included 400 villages, was in what is now Chhattisgarh state. It bordered Rewa State to the north and southwest; Surguja State to the east; the British district of Bilaspur (Central Provinces) to the south; and Changbhakar State to the west.

== History ==
Korea State was founded in the 17th century. The ruling family of Koriya were Rajputs of the Chauhan dynasty who came to Koriya from Rajputana in the 13th century and conquered the country. Before the coming of the Marathas, it is alleged that the rajas of Koriya "lived in perfect independence, and never having been necessitated to submit to the payment of any tribute, they had no occasion to oppress their subjects." This situation changed in 1790 when Korea had to pay tribute to the Marathas.

Historically, Korea State also seems to have had some indefinite feudal relations with Surguja, but the British government ignored this claim when Koriya was ceded to them by the Bhonsle Raja of Nagpur in 1818. On 24 Dec 1819 the state became a British protectorate. Upon the extinction of the direct line in 1897, a distant collateral branch of the ruling family was recognized as successor by the British Raj.

In 1891, the Raj decided that the five states of the Surguja group (Surguja, Udaipur, Jashpur, Korea, and Changbhakar), as well as the states of Bonai, Gangpur, Seraikela, and Kharsawan, formerly known as the Tributary Mahals of Chhota Nagpur, were not part of British India, and revised sanads were issued in 1899, formally recognizing them as feudatory states and defining their relations with the British Raj.

== Rulers ==
The rulers of the state have apparently always held the title of 'Raja' and were so recognized by the British as early as 1819.

=== Rajas ===
- .... - .... Jit Rai Deo
- .... - .... Sagar Sahi Deo
- .... - .... Afhar Sahi Deo
- .... - .... Jahan Sahi Deo
- .... - .... Sawal Sahi Deo
- .... - .... Gajraj Singh Deo
- 1795 - Jun 1828 Gharib Singh Deo (b. 1745 - d. 1828)
- Jun 1828 - 1864 Amole Singh Deo (b. 1785 - d. 1864)
- 4 Apr 1864 - 1897 Pran Singh Deo (b. 1857/59 - d. 1897)
- 1897 - 18 Nov 1909 Sheo Mangal Singh Deo (b. 1874 - d. 1909)
- 18 Nov 1909 – 15 Aug 1947 Ramanuj Pratap Singh Deo (b. 1901 - d. 1954)

== See also ==
- Eastern States Agency
- Chirmiri
- Manendragarh
