= Ramanuj Pratap Singh Deo =

Last Raja of the Korea State (r. 1909–47)

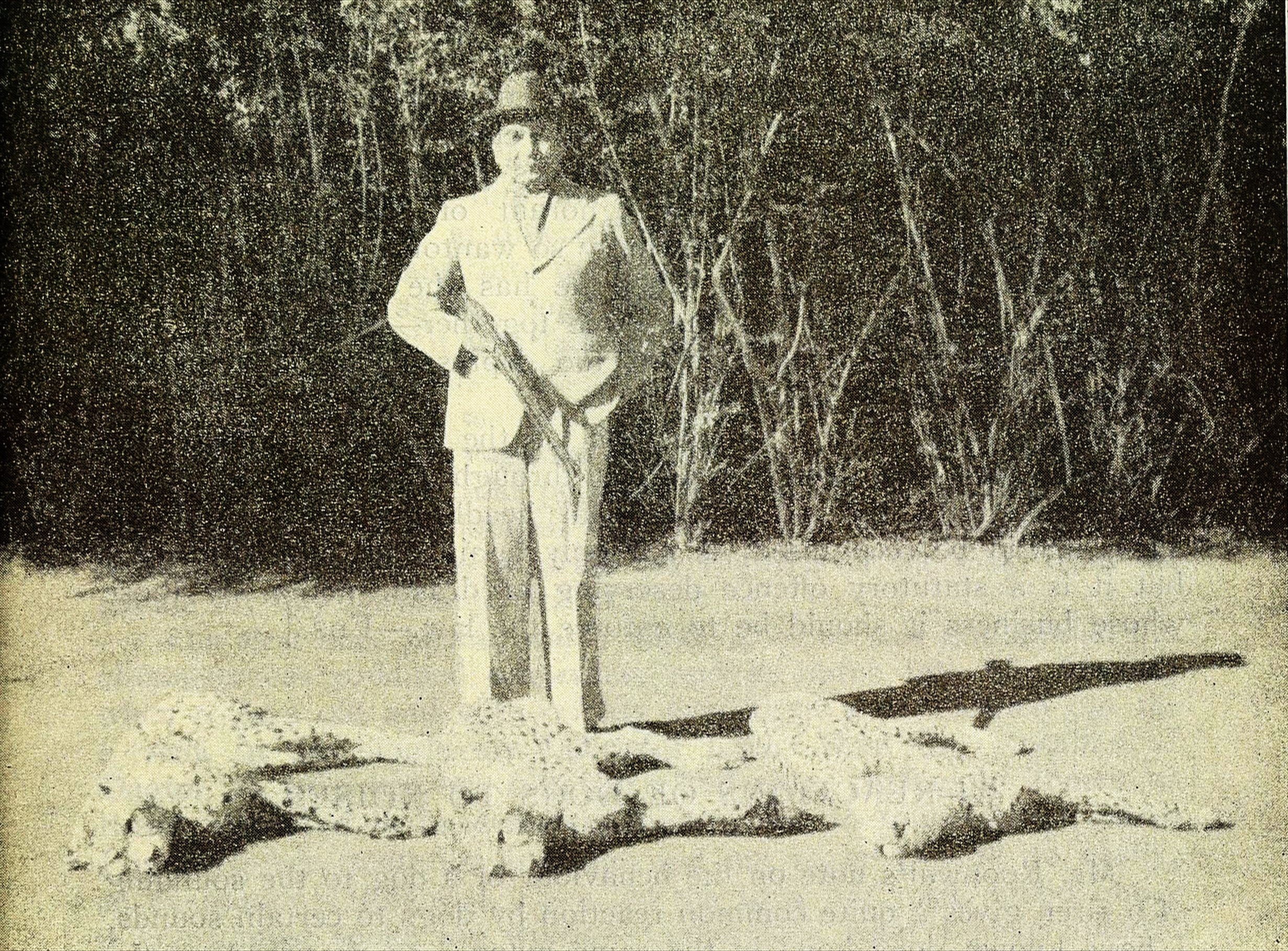
The three last Asiatic cheetahs recorded from India were shot down in 1947, by Maharaja Ramanuj Pratap Singh Deo of Korea, as seen in this photo submitted by his private secretary to JBNHS.

Ramanuj Pratap Singh Deo (1901–1958) was the last ruler of the princely Korea State in the British Raj. He was crowned as the king of Korea in 1925 and continued to rule the state until the state's merger with independent India on 1 January 1948. He was a member of the Chauhan dynasty. He had represented the ruling Chief in the second Round Table Conference held in London in 1931.

He is notorious for killing the last three surviving Asiatic cheetahs of India. It is believed that he killed as many as 1,710 tigers in the central part of India. His granddaughter, Ambica Singh, and grandson, Amba Singh, defended their grandfather by claiming that he never killed big cats for fun but rather hunted only those animals who had turned man-eaters. Nevertheless, while tigers are well-known for occasionally becoming man-eaters, there is no documentation of wild cheetahs ever killing a human, and the number of tigers reported to have become man-eaters in his lifetime is far less than the up to 1,710 tigers he reportedly killed.

In August 1947, several princely states under the Eastern States Agency attempted to form their own state called the Eastern States Union, which Deo led. However, major states like Mayurbhanj and Bastar did not join. He died in 1958.
