= Vincent van der Merwe =

South African researcher (1983–2025)

- Born: 1983; Limpopo, South Africa
- Died: 16 March 2025 (aged 41–42); Riyadh, Saudi Arabia

Vincent van der Merwe (1983 – 16 March 2025) was a South African conservationist, scientist, and National Geographic Explorer. Vincent was known for his role in cheetah conservation and reintroduction projects in Africa and Asia.

== Education and career ==
Vincent was born in 1983 in Limpopo province of South Africa. After school at Pretoria Boys High - where he was a boarder at Rissik House boarding house - he completed a BSc (Hons) degree in Entomology through the University of Pretoria and later graduating with a Master of Science (PhD) at the University of Cape Town . He founded the Cheetah Metapopulation Initiative (TMI) which managed the growth of the cheetah population across various wildlife reserves worldwide. His efforts helped improve genetic diversity and ensure the survival of the species in reserves across Africa.

In 2017 Vincent van der Merwe received a Kudu Award from the South African National Parks for his contribution to conservation through the growing of the cheetah population in and outside the national parks system.

== Death ==
Vincent was found dead in his apartment on March 16, 2025, in Riyadh, Saudi Arabia, where he was involved in India's Project Cheetah. He played a key role in Prime Minister Narendra Modi’s Project Cheetah in Madhya Pradesh, along with local officers.

== Awards and recognition ==
- The "Matric Geography Prize" at Pretoria Boys High, and recognition as a top-performing student in the Geography subject during his Matric (Grade 12) exams (2000).
- Endangered Wildlife Trust Conservation Achiever of the Year (2015).
- South African National Parks Kudu Award 2017.
