= Yadvendradev Vikramsinh Jhala =

Indian scientist and conservationist

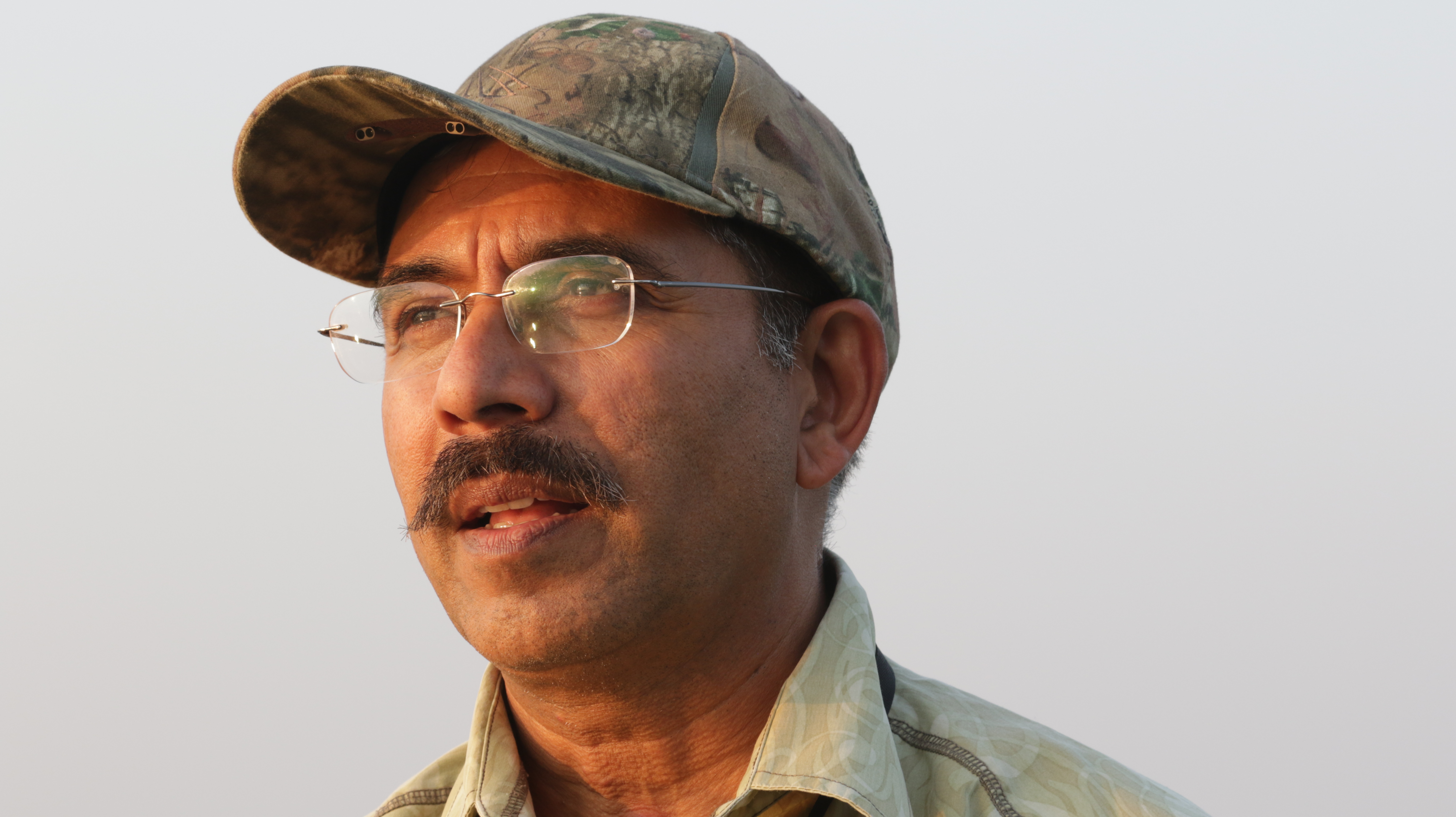
- Born: February 27, 1962 (age 64); Mumbai, Maharashtra, India
- Education: University of Mumbai Virginia Polytechnic Institute and State University Smithsonian Institution
- Known for: Project Tiger, Cheetah reintroduction in India
- Scientific career
- Fields: Ecology and wildlife restoration
- Workplaces: Wildlife Institute of India; St. Xavier's College, Mumbai; Virginia Polytechnic Institute and State University

Yadvendradev Vikramsinh Jhala is an Indian scientist and conservationist. He was the faculty and Dean (2018–23) of the Wildlife Institute of India in Dehradun for 30 years. Currently, he is a Senior Scientist of the Indian National Science Academy hosted at the National Centre for Biological Sciences, Bengaluru.

Jhala led long-term research projects on Indian wolves and Asiatic lions. Since 2002, Jhala has been working with National Tiger Conservation Authority Project Tiger, where he designed and led the implementation of national scale population assessments for tigers, other carnivores, ungulates and monitoring of habitats. He designed and implemented the conservation initiatives of reintroducing the cheetah to India, and conservation breeding of the Great Indian Bustard.

== Career ==
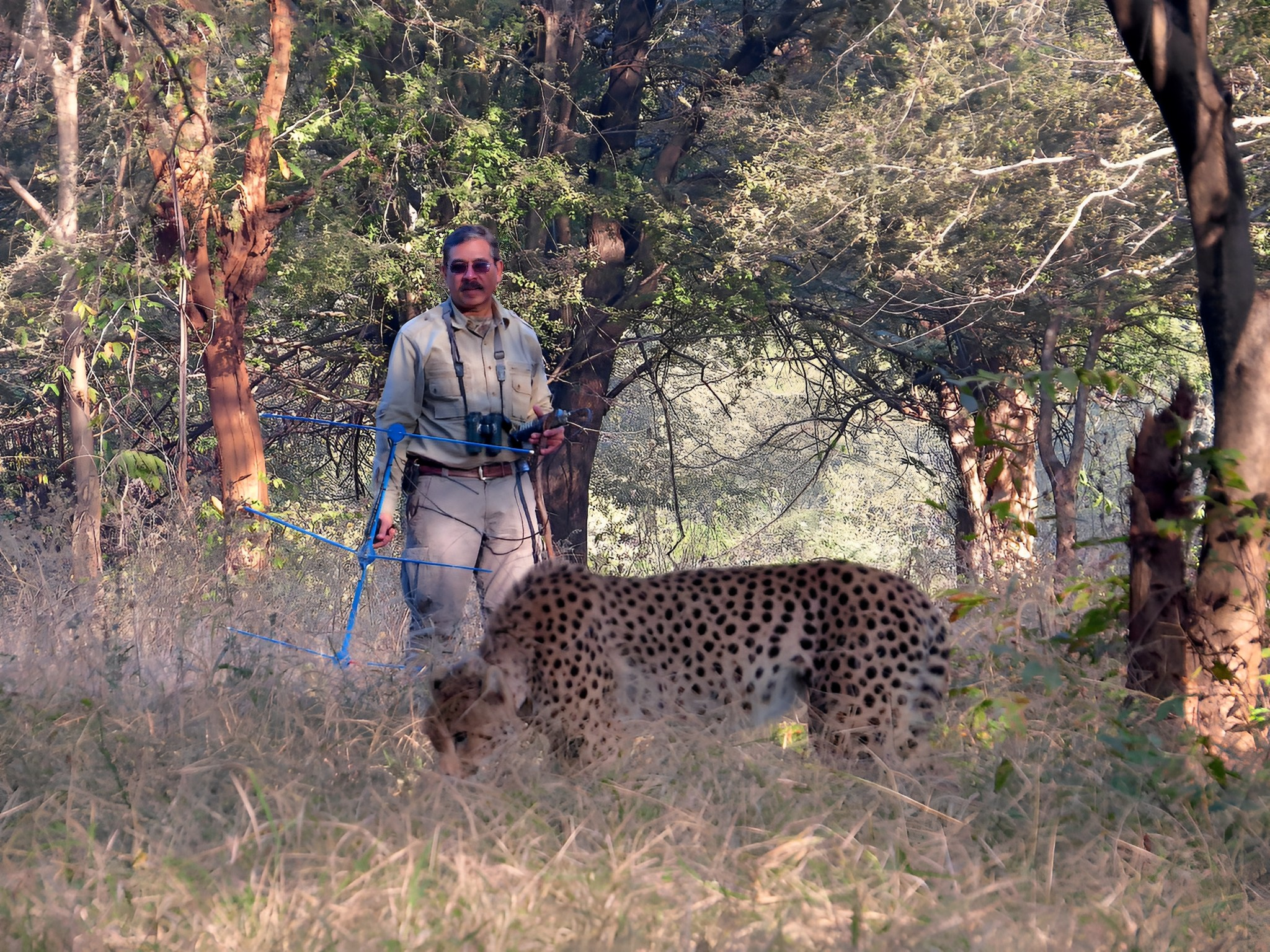
Monitoring the newly reintroduced cheetahs in Kuno, India.

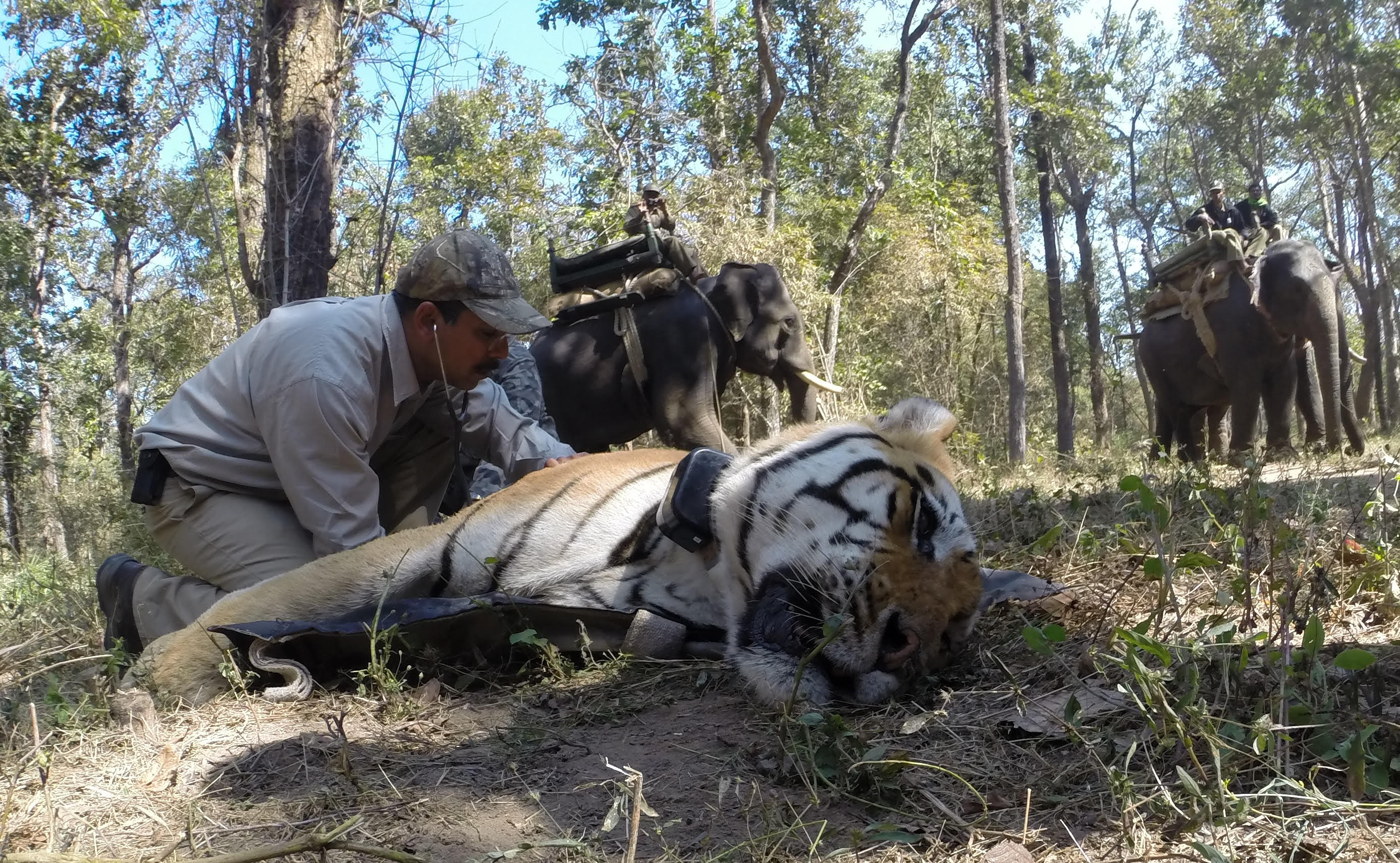
Y. V. Jhala checking the vital rates of a tranquilized tiger.

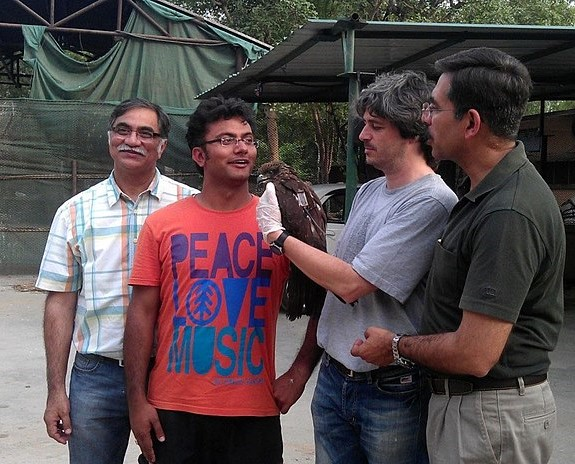
Left to right: Qamar Qureshi, Nishant Kumar, Fabrizio Sergio and Y.V. Jhala with the first GPS tagged black kite of Asia

Jhala studied zoology for his Bachelor’s (1983) and Masters degree (1985) from the University of Bombay and graduated with gold medals. He served as a lecturer at St. Xaviers College (1985-1987), Mumbai before beginning doctoral studies at Virginia Polytechnic Institute and State University in the United States in wildlife science and management. For his doctoral thesis he studied prey-predator dynamics of wolves and blackbuck. After his post-doctoral research and teaching of the Wildlife Conservation and Management Courses at the Smithsonian Institution between 1990 and 1993, he joined the Wildlife Institute of India as a member of the faculty in 1993. Jhala worked with Rajesh Gopal and subsequent heads of Project Tiger.

== Awards and distinctions ==
In December 2022, Jhala was elected a fellow of the Indian National Science Academy (INSA).

His citation read: "Professor Y V Jhala has been elected a fellow of INSA for his outstanding contribution to and leadership in the field of tiger ecology, conservation and management. Prof. Jhala’s research spans an array of topics including ecology, behaviour, genetics, evolution, participatory conservation and policy on tigers, lions and other large carnivores. His pioneering leadership on the science behind large carnivore census is key to tiger conservation globally. Dr. Jhala has emerged as an important figure in the global effort to conserve, study and manage one of the highest profile endangered species in the world. He has been credibly able to succeed at navigating his outstanding scientific works with the conservation and management of flagship carnivore species in the field."

Jhala has received the Carl Zeiss Award and the Wildlife Service Award-2008 by Sanctuary Asia and Royal Bank of Scotland for “Tiger Conservation Work in India”.

A Guinness world record accorded to Wildlife Institute of India and National Tiger Conservation Authority for the most extensive wildlife survey through trail cameras was bestowed to the 2018–19 tiger survey in India for which Jhala and Prof Qamar Qureshi are the lead scientists.

In December 2023, Jhala was elected a fellow of the National Academy of Sciences, India (NASI).

== Filmography ==
- Counting Tigers, National Geographic Society and iTV, 2019
- Great Indian Bustard Documentary
- Decoding the man eaters of Sundarbans, Animal Planet 2017
- Desert Wolves of India, BBC Wildlife Series, 2004
- Man-eaters of India, National Geographic Television 1997
- Bringing Wildlife Back: Dr. Jhala's Mission to Restore India's Endangered Species

== See also ==
- MK Ranjitsinh Jhala
- Digvijaysinh Jhala
- Population ecology
- Quantitative ecology
