= Kuno National Park =

National park in Madhya Pradesh, India

- IUCN category II (national park)
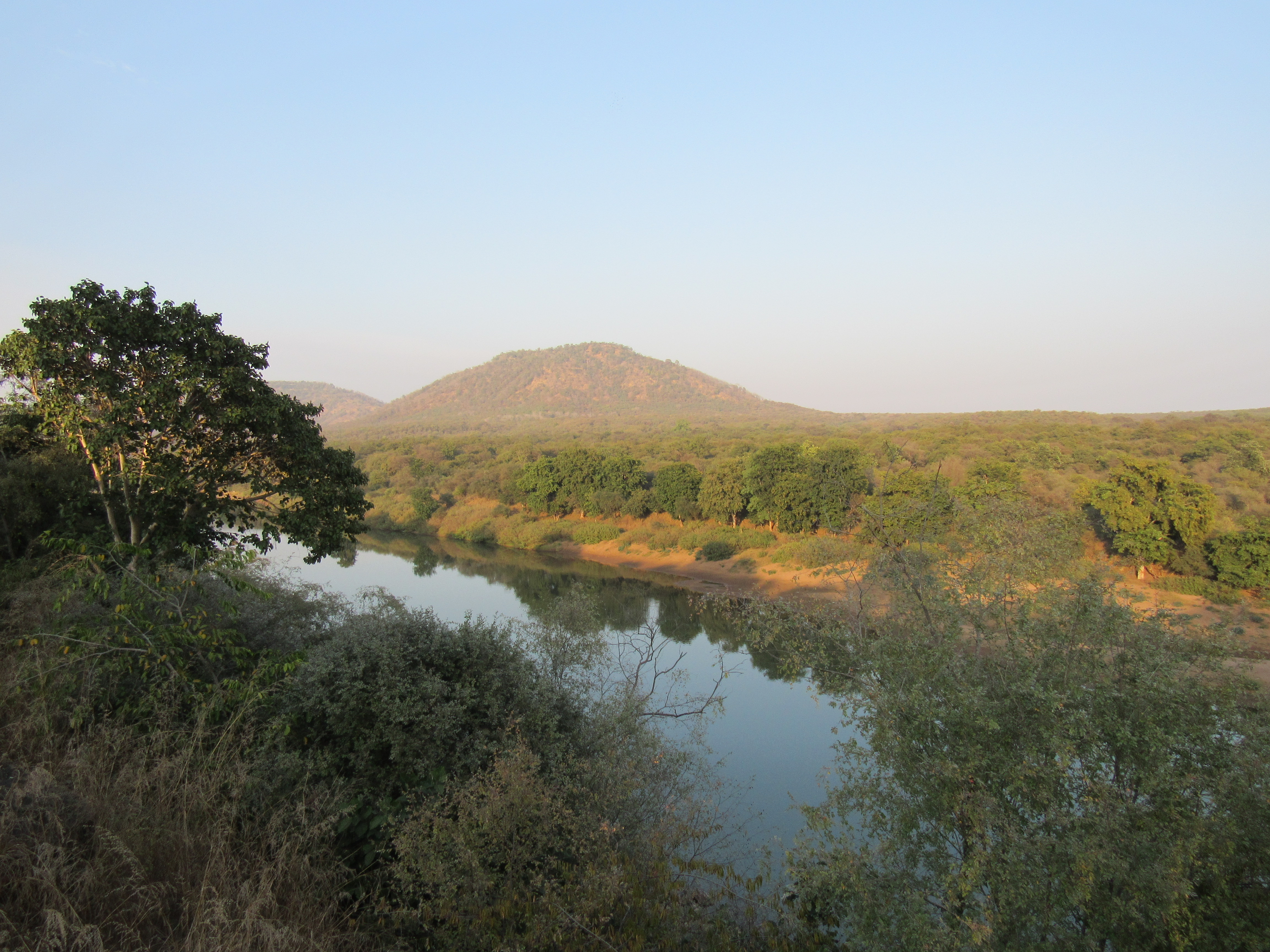
- Kuno river view in Kuno National Park

- Location within Madhya Pradesh Location within India
- Interactive map of Kuno National Park
- Location: Sheopur and Shivpuri districts in Madhya Pradesh, India
- Nearest city: Gwalior, Shivpuri, Sheopur
- Coordinates: 25°40′00″N 77°10′00″E
- Area: 748.76 km^{2} (289.10 sq mi)
- Established: 1981; 45 years ago as Wildlife Sanctuary; 2018; 8 years ago as National Park
- Named for: Kuno River
- Governing body: Divisional Forest Officer
- Website: www.kunonationalpark.org

Kuno National Park is a national park and wildlife sanctuary in the Gwalior Chambal region of Madhya Pradesh, India. It derives its name from the Kuno River. It was established in 1981 as a wildlife sanctuary with an initial area of 344.686 km^{2} (133.084 sq mi). In 2018, it was given the status of a national park with total area of 748.76 km^{2} (289.10 sq mi). The national park is the first site for the African cheetah translocation to India named Project Cheetah.

== History ==
Kuno Wildlife Sanctuary was established in 1981 with an initial area of about 344.68 km^{2} (133.08 sq mi) in the Sheopur and Morena districts. In 2018, it was given the status of a national park with total area of 748.76 km^{2} (289.10 sq mi).

In the 1990s, it was selected as a possible site to implement the Asiatic Lion Reintroduction Project, which aimed at establishing a second lion population in India. Between 1998 and 2003, about 1,650 inhabitants of 24 villages were resettled to sites outside the protected area. Most of the inhabitants were Saharia tribal people. The villages were also home to Jatav, Brahmin, Gurjar, Kushwaha and Yadav people. An area of 924 km^{2} (357 sq mi) surrounding the wildlife sanctuary was added as a buffer zone to human settlements. In 2009, Kuno Wildlife Sanctuary was also proposed as a possible site for cheetah reintroduction in India.

Gujarat state had resisted the relocation of lion, since it would make the Gir Wildlife Sanctuary lose its status as the world's only home of the Asiatic lion. In April 2013, the Indian Supreme Court ordered Gujarat to send some of their Gir lions to Madhya Pradesh to establish a second population. The court had given wildlife authorities six months to complete the transfer. In December 2018, the state government changed the status of the wildlife sanctuary to Kuno National Park and enlarged the protected area by 413 km^{2} (159 sq mi). The Gujarat government has not carried out the Supreme Court's order since 2013 and resisted the relocation of lions to other states.

In January 2022, environment minister Bhupender Yadav launched the action plan for reintroducing cheetahs in India, starting with Kuno national park. According to Bhopal-based environmentalist Ajay Dubey plans to reintroduce African cheetahs in Kuno National Park is another way to escape the transfer of lions to the Kuno National Park. According to experts and wild conservationists, the introduction of African cheetah into India did not make sense in conservation science and the project was plagued with lack of transparency and accountability.

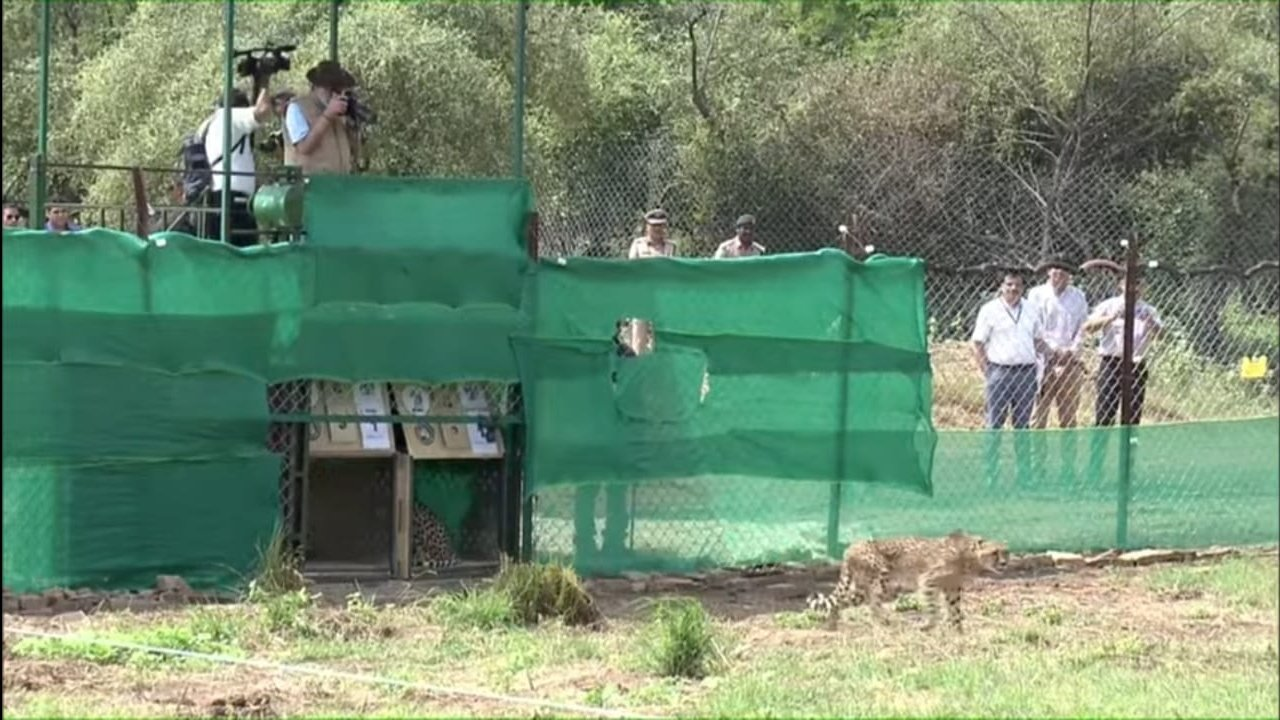
Cheetah released into Kuno National Park in September 2022 by Prime Minister of India Narendra Modi

On 17 September 2022, five females and three male cheetahs aged 4 to 6 years arrived in Kuno National Park from Namibia. On 18 February 2023, 12 more cheetahs arrived in Kuno National Park. On 11 March 2023, two cheetahs were released into the wild of Kuno National Park. On 5 February 2025, five cheetahs were released into the wild. On 21 February 2025, five more cheetahs were released.

== Geography ==
Kuno National Park is located in Sheopur and Morena district of Madhya Pradesh, India. It derives its name from the Kuno River which flows through the Park. It was established in 1981 as a wildlife sanctuary with an initial area of 344.686 km^{2} (133.084 sq mi) and later increased to 748.76 km^{2} (289.10 sq mi). It was declared a National Park in 2018. Palpur fort is located in the core area of park which was built during 18th century by rulers of Karauli state.

The nearest Airport to Kuno National Park is Gwalior Airport and nearest railway station is Gwalior Junction Railway Station.

== Flora ==
The vegetation in the park varies from tropical dry deciduous forest to savannah grasslands. It is part of the Khathiar-Gir dry deciduous forests ecoregion. The vegetation includes Anogeissus pendula forest and scrub, Boswellia and Butea forest, dry savanna forest and grassland and tropical riverine forest. The dominant tree species are Acacia catechu, Salai Boswellia serrata, Tendu Diospyros melanoxylon, Palash Butea monosperma, Dhok Anogeissus latifolia, Acacia leucophloea, Ziziphus mauritiana and Ziziphus xylopyrus. Prominent shrub species include Grewia flavescens, Helicteres isora, Hopbush viscosa, Vitex negundo. Grass species include Heteropogon contortus, Apluda mutica, Aristida hystrix, Themeda quadrivalvis, Cenchrus ciliaris and Desmostachya bipinnata. Senna tora and Argemone mexicana are also common.

== Fauna ==
=== Mammals ===
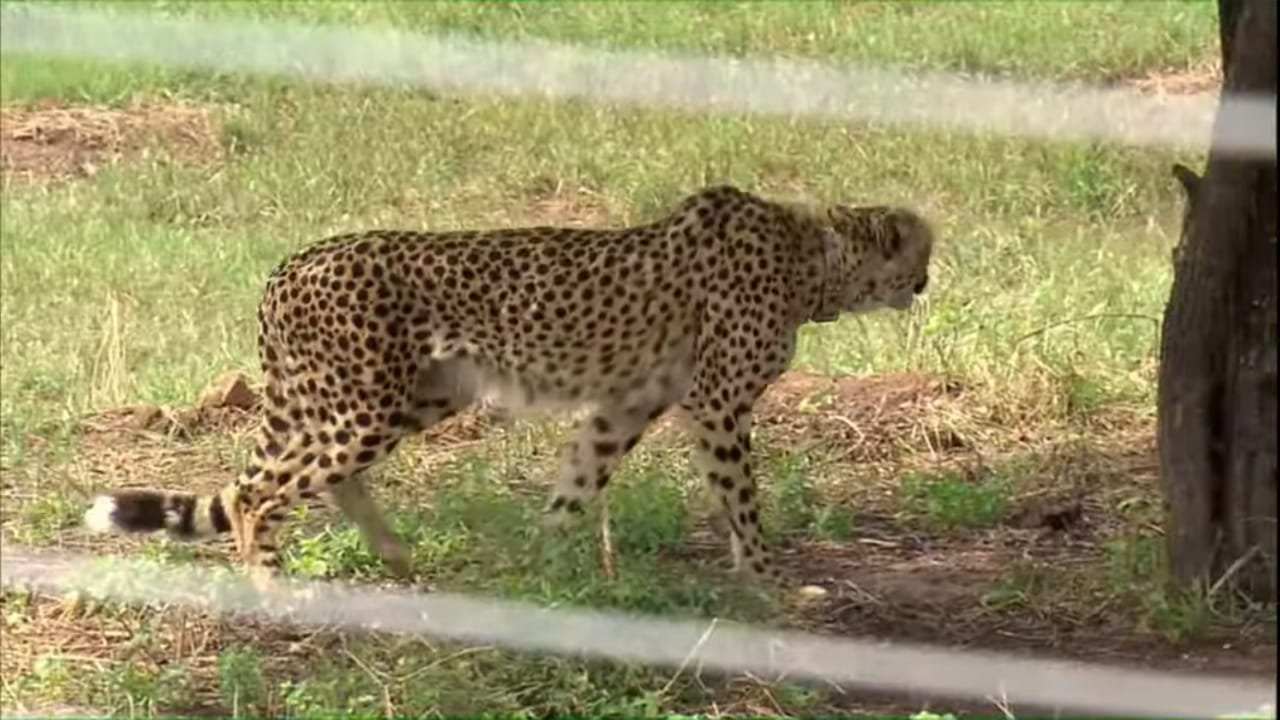
A Southeast African Cheetah inside the quarantine facility in Kuno National Park

Kuno National Park hosts many species of wildlife including chital, sambar, nilgai, chinkara, blackbuck, chousingha, wild boar, Indian porcupine, Indian hare and langurs. The main predators occurring in the protected area are Indian leopard, jungle cat, sloth bear, dhole, Indian wolf, Indian jackal, striped hyena, Bengal fox and Indian grey mongoose. More than 1,900 feral zebu cattle were estimated to occur in 2008, whereas density of wild ungulates was considered too low to sustain an introduced lion population at the time. In 2023, Southeast African cheetahs were released in Kuno National Park.

=== Reptiles ===
Mugger crocodile, gharial, Bengal monitor and Indian softshell turtle have been sighted in Kuno River.

=== Birds ===
A total of 129 bird species were sighted during a survey in spring 2007. Indian white-backed vulture, long-billed vulture, red-headed vulture, Egyptian vulture, crested serpent-eagle, short-toed snake eagle, Bonelli's eagle, white-eyed buzzard, changeable hawk-eagle, brown fish owl and spotted owlet are resident raptors. Western marsh-harrier, pied harrier, Montagu's harrier, steppe eagle, osprey, common kestrel, short-eared owl, Demoiselle crane and common crane are winter visitors.

Avifauna also includes black-winged kite, painted spurfowl, ruddy shelduck, Indian peafowl, grey francolin, Eurasian nightjar, jungle nightjar, Indian nightjar, painted sandgrouse, woolly-necked stork, great stone-curlew, Sirkeer malkoha, Indian golden oriole, black-rumped flameback, bay-backed shrike and Indian paradise flycatcher.

== See also ==
- In-situ conservation
- Ex-situ conservation
- Wildlife conservation
