= National Waterway 5 =

National waterway in India

Coordinates: 20.877733°N 85.777511°E

National Waterways 5 (NW-5)

Details
- Location: India
- Opened: November 2008
- Length: 623 km
- Owner: Inland Waterways Authority of India (IWAI)
- Operator: Central Inland Water Transport Corporation (CIWTC)

National Waterway 5 (NW-5) is one of six National Waterways in India and it covers the state of Odisha and a part of West Bengal. It runs a total length of 623 km of which 91 km is within West Bengal and the remaining 532 km is in Odisha. It was declared a National Waterway in November 2008. The NW-5 consists of the stretches from Talcher to Dhamra on the Brahmani River a distance of 265 km including the Kharsua and Dhamra river systems, the Geonkhali–Charbatia stretch of the East Coast Canal of 217 km, the Charbatia–Dhamra stretch of Matai River of 40 km and the Mangalgadi–Paradip stretch of the Mahanadi River Delta running for 101 km. The waterway also includes a 91 km stretch in Bengal between Geonkhali and Nasirabad, West Bengal.

A bill was introduced in Parliament on 8 December 2006, to declare these stretches as NW 5 and it was passed with amendments in 2008 and a sum of Rs. 1525 crore was allocated towards readying the identified waterways as the NW 5.

When the project reaches its peak capacity by 2016, it is expected to handle over 18 million tonnes of cargo annually. The traffic on the NW 5 will consist largely of cargo such as coal, fertiliser, cement, iron ore and agricultural and industrial products that will be handled at four terminals— Talcher, Nasirabd, Balasore and Rajnagar. The transport of coal from Talcher to the Dhamra and Paradip ports is expected to contribute to the bulk of the traffic and it is estimated that the total tonnage will near 23 million tonnes in about 15 years from the completion of the project.

Since the Brahmani River has a sharp river regime, 5 barrages are to be constructed on the river between Talcher and Jokadia to maintain a minimum draft. Each barrage will have navigational locks that allows for the passage of two 500 tonne vessels at a time. With the addition of NW 4 and NW 5, the total length of National Waterways in India became 4460 km.

== See also ==
- Inland Waterways Authority of India
- Inland waterways of India
