= Mouda, Odisha =

Coordinates: 21.030841°N 86.519477°E

Mouda Khandatara Mouda
- Village
- Interactive map of Mouda
- Country: India
- State: Orissa
- District: Bhadrak
- Talukas: Bhadrak

Government
  - Body: Bhadrak Municipality, Khandatara Gram Panchayat

Languages
  - Official: Oriya
- Time zone: UTC+5:30 (IST)
- Vehicle registration: OR-
- Nearest city: Bhubaneswar, Cuttack, Balasore
- Lok Sabha constituency: Bhadrak
- Vidhan Sabha constituency: Bhadrak
- Civic agency: Bhadrak Municipality, Khandatara Gram Panchayat
- Website: odisha.gov.in

Mouda is the largest village in Khandatara mauja. Khandatara is a mauja (cluster village) in Bhadrak district of Orissa. There are about 10 temples in the village.

== Places of interest ==
Salandi Escape can be visited to see how a branch (NALIA) escapes from main river Salandi river.

- A holy festival in the Month of march keeps the villagers busy and entertained for a week.
- Near by Bhadrakali Temple is a walking distance from Mouda
- Khandeswar Mahadev Temple, Mahadevpur, near Salandi Escape

== How to reach ==
This village can be approached in two ways. Mouda is about 5 km from Bhadrak Bus stand and about 7 km from Bhadrak railway station.

1. From Bhadrak Bus stand take the following chronological route — Kacheri Bazar, Santhia (Bhadrak Women's College) - Purana Bazar - Garadpur - Durgapur - Mouda
2. Alternatively From Bhadrak Bus stand take the following chronological route - Kacheri Bazar, Santhia (Bhadrak Women's College) - Purana Bazar - Banka Bazar - Uttar Bahini - Take a right turn near Baspur to reach Mouda.

== See also ==
- Bhadrak
