= Dhamara Fishing Harbour =

Coordinates: 20.793178°N 86.900656°E

Dhamra Fishing Harbour

Location
- Country: India
- Location: Dhamra, Odisha

Details
- Opened: March, 1978
- Operated by: 2009
- Owned by: Government of Odisha
- Type of harbour: Fishing port
- No. of berths: 3

Dhamara Fishing Harbour is an international standard Harbour. The Harbour is located in the North Bank of Dhamra River in the revenue village Dhamara, Dist. Bhadrak. It has become the first harbour certified by Export Inspection Agency (EIA) in the state following approval of the Export Inspection Council (EIC), India and meets the Euro standard fish food as specified by European Union.

The major species landing in the jetties are (i) Pomfret (ii) Shrimps (iii) Bombay Duck (iv) Hilsha (v) Mackerel (vi) Johnius (Vii) Ribbon fish (Viii) Megalops (ix) Borei etc. These species have high demand both in National and International market.

All these fish landings are maintained with proper cold chain and processed hygienically for value addition to fetch good price in the market which are regularly checked by the Harbour Authorities for maintenance of the quality.

== History ==
There was an old Fish landing centre operating here since long. Subsequently, it was developed with UNDP assistance and it was a FAO executed Project (1971–74). The Project was commissioned in March'1978 with a cost of 103.80 lakhs constructed by Irrigation Department and handed over to Chief Construction Engineer, Gopalpur Port Project, under Commerce & Transport (Commerce) Department during 1980s for collection of users fees. Subsequently, Stage-II was constructed on 14.7.2008 and handed over to Commerce & Transport (Commerce) Department. Both the Phase-I & Phase-II Jetties with the Whole Harbour Complex were handed over on 01.12.2009 to Management Society, Dhamara Fishing Harbour, Dhamara under Fisheries Deptt. Govt of Odisha for its day-to-day smooth management. Thus at present the Harbour is unified and under "Management Society, Dhamara Fishing Harbour, Dhamara".

== Additional information ==
Dhamara and adjacent villages are traditionally inhabited by fishermen since long and they depend on fishing and its allied activities to make their livelihood. Before 1980s these fishermen were very poor and their per capita income was below average with mud thatched roof houses. Now due to construction of harbour and its operation since 1978 onwards the living condition of the people have increased manifold. More than 40% of fishermen own fishing crafts and gears and have constructed good quality RCC house.

== Location ==
It is 20° 52'(N) latitude and 87° 04' longitude(E) and 7 K.M. from the point where the Dhamara River meets with the Bay of Bengal.

== Communication ==
The nearest Airport is Bhubaneswar & Railway Station is Bhadrak (Charampa). The distance from Bhadrak is 80 km by road and about 220 km. from Bhubaneswar, the state capital of Odisha.
