= Dhamra Airstrip =

Dhamra Airport
- IATA: none; ICAO: none

Summary
- Airport type: Public
- Owner: Dhamra Port Company Limited
- Serves: Dhamra
- Location: Dhamra, Bhadrak district, Odisha
- Coordinates: 20°49′24″N 86°57′46″E

Map
- Location within Odisha Location within India

Runways
Direction	Length		Surface
Direction	ft	m	Surface
16/34	11,483	3,500	Asphalt

Dhamra airport is an airport serving Dhamra, Odisha, India. The airport is located 20 km from Dhamra Port in the Bhadrak district of Odisha, India. The Airport is located in the Balimunda Village which is coming under the Basudevpur block of Bhadrak district.

== History ==
In 2018, the Dhamara Port Company Limited (DPCL), run by the Adani Group, forwarded a proposal to the Odisha government to set up an airport to boost commercial activities near the Dhamra port. The Odisha government accorded in-principle approval in September 2018 and sought a detail project report. In November 2018, the State Government signed a Memorandum of Understanding with DPCL for the development of a commercial airport over 500 acres at the cost of Rs. 500 crore. It will have a runway length of 3,500 meters. In January 2020, the Government approved of DPCL's proposal to acquire 274 acres of land for the airstrip. The State Government would take a call on acquiring the remaining land for the project at a later date.
