= Dhamra =

Dhamara "ଧାମରା"
- Town
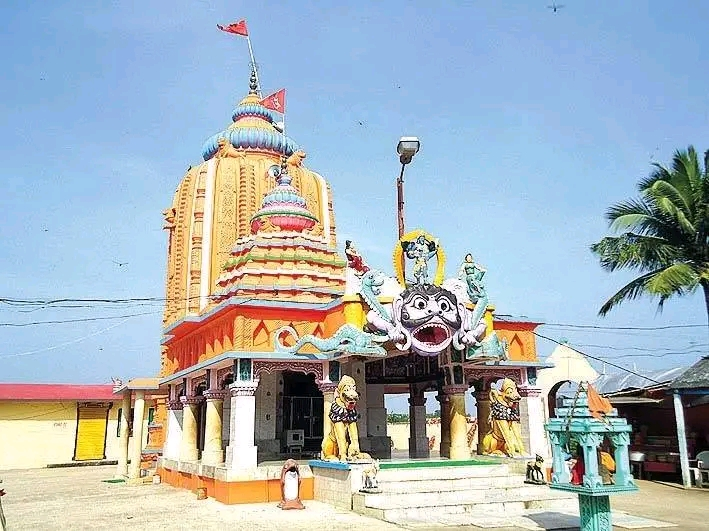
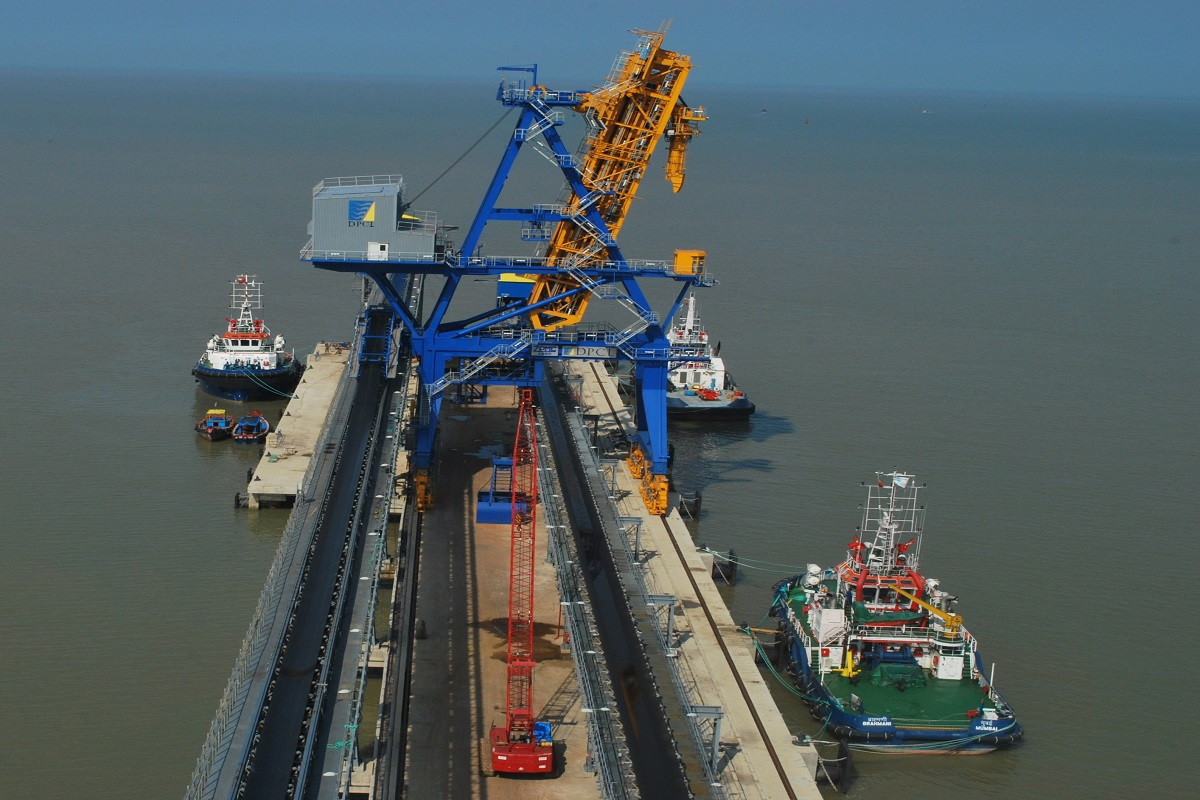
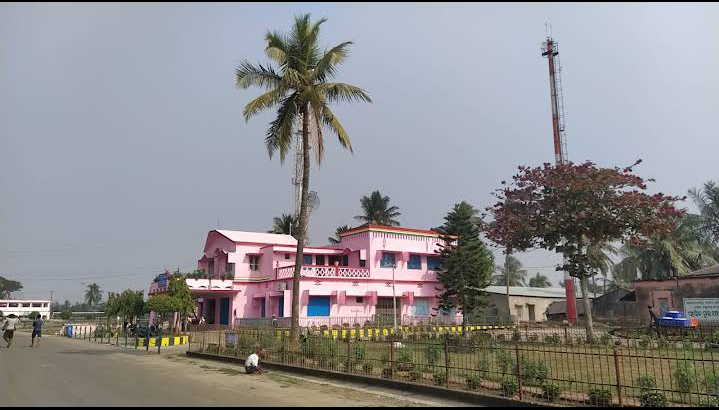
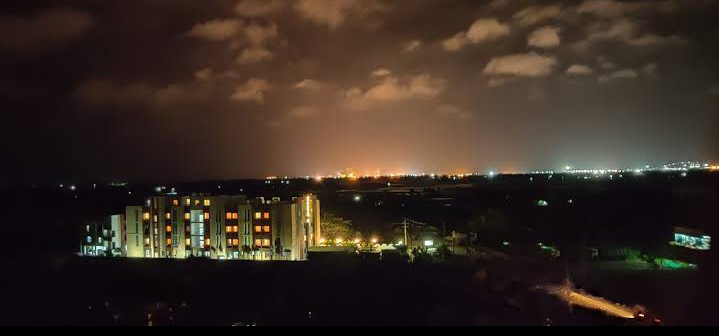
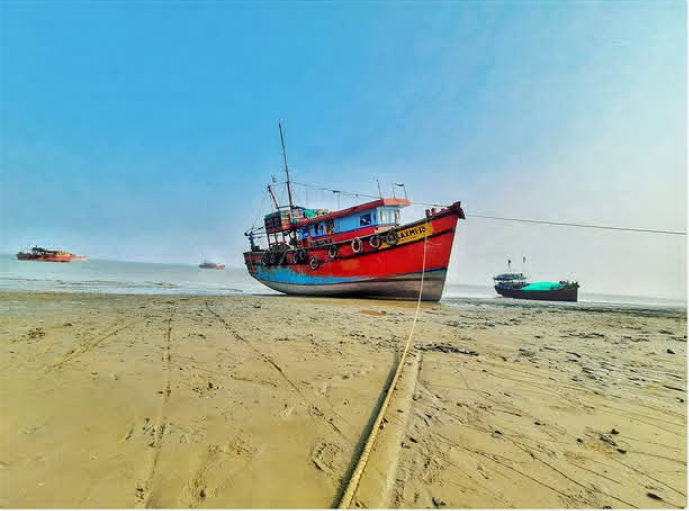
- Maa Dhamarai Temple Dhamra Port Dhamara Fishing Harbour Night View of Dhamara Port Dhamara Sea Beach
- Nickname: Industrial Port Town
- Location in Odisha, India Dhamara "ଧାମରା" (India)
- Coordinates: 20°47′44″N 86°54′03″E
- Country: India
- State: Odisha
- District: Bhadrak district

Government
  - Body: Gram Panchayat
- Elevation: 0 m (0 ft)

Languages
  - Official: Odia
- Time zone: UTC+5:30 (IST)
- PIN: 756171
- Telephone code: 06786
- Vehicle registration: OD-22
- Website: odisha.gov.in

Dhamara is a Town In the Bhadrak district of Odisha state, India. It is a small community on the banks of the Dhamra River in the Bhadrak district of Odisha state, India.

== History ==
They were Shoodars before independence, as it's in history. Others believe they're descendants of Clan Loot. It developed as a port around the 15th century AD. The port was used for the coastal trade between northern Odisha and Kolkata to the northeast, and continued to be used to a small extent after independence in 1947. During April, 1998, an agreement was signed to develop the Port of Dhamara, about seven kilometers away on the coast of the Bay of Bengal, as a deep water port.

== Tourism Places ==
- Dhamarai Temple
- Dhamra Port
- Dhamara Fishing Harbour
- Dhamara Sea Beach
- Shanidev Temple, Dhamara

== Educational Institution ==
=== Colleges ===
- Dhamarai Junior College, Dhamara
- Dhamarai Sanskrit Degree College, Narasinghpur

=== Schools ===
- Dhamara Nodal High School, Narasinghpur, Dhamara
- Dhamarai U. G. M. E School, Dhamara
- Sai Ananta International School, Dhamara

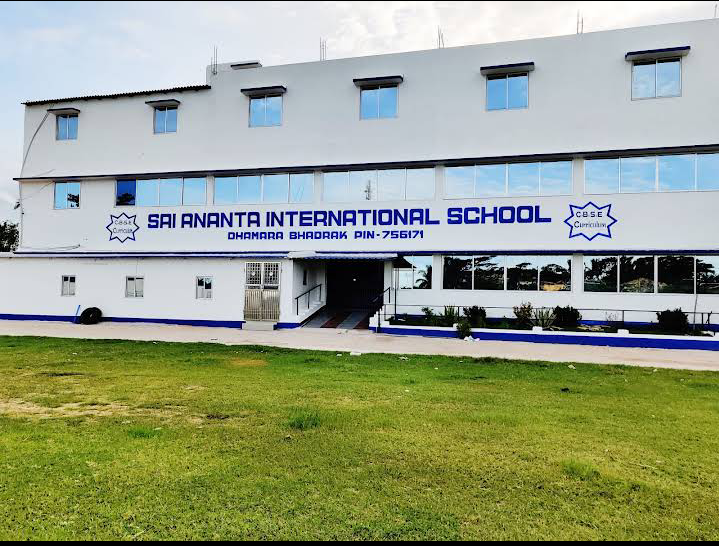

- G.P High School, Jagula
- Dosinga Govt. High School, Dosingha
- J.N high School, Kaithkhola
- V.N.U.V.P High School, Kaithkhola
- F.M Industrial Training Institute, Dhamra

== Transportation ==
=== Roads ===
Dhamara town is well connected with the state of Odisha, and to other parts of the country as well. The town is well connected by Dhamara to Jamujhadi road via National Highway 16, 210 kilometres (130 mi) northeast of Bhubaneswar, the state capital. Dhamra town has one bus stop, Which is the Main Bus Stand of the town. There are frequent buses to and from Cuttack, Bhubaneswar, Balasore, Rourkela, Puri, and Calcutta, Contai, Sambalpur and more.

=== Rails ===
The Nearest Railway Station is Bhadrak railway station is at Charampa, which is 80 kilometres (50 mi) from Dhamara.

=== Airport ===
The nearest airport is Biju Patnaik International Airport, 215 kilometres (134 mi) southwest, near Bhubaneswar.The Dhamra Port Company Limited plans to build Dhamra Airport 20 km from Dhamra Port.

=== Ports ===
The nearest port is Dhamra Port, around 10 kilometers east of the town.

== Hotels ==
- Hotel Golden Anchor, Dhamara

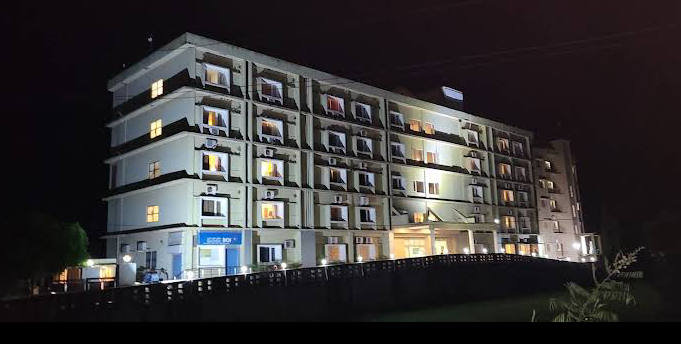
Hotel Golden Anchor

- Hotel DFC Residency, Dhamara

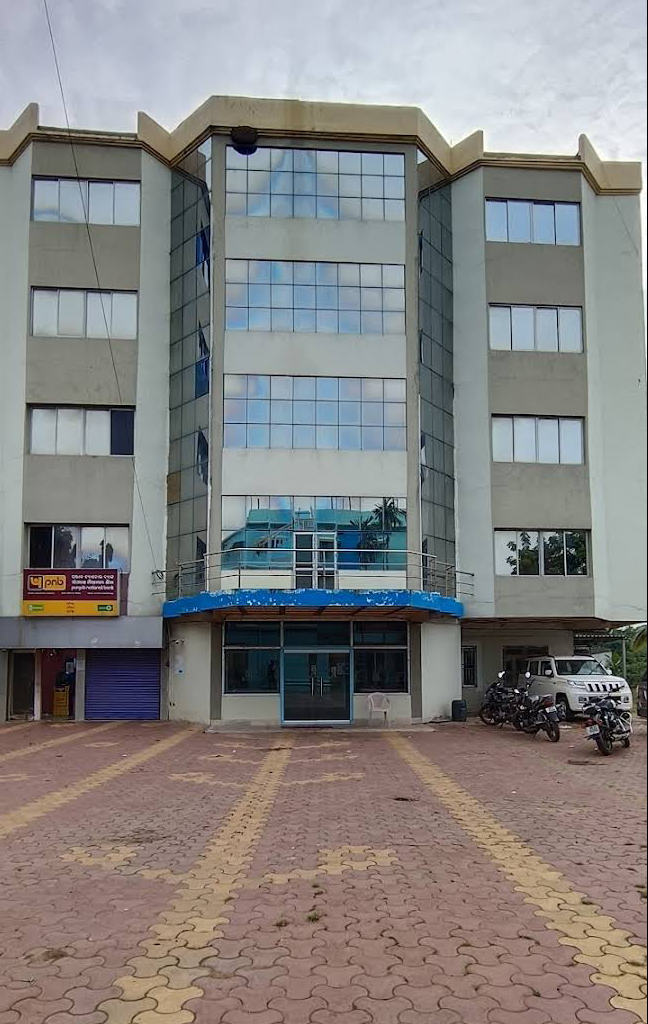
Hotel DFC Residency

- Hotel JJ Resorts, Dhamara

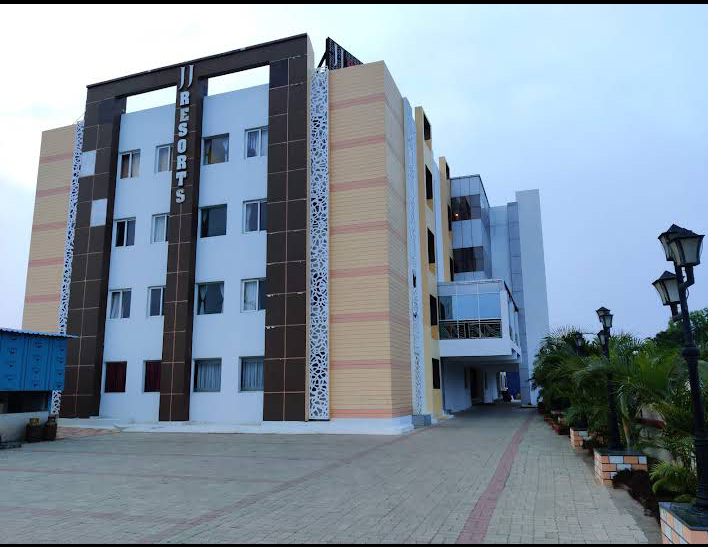
JJ Resorts

- Maa Dhamarai Palace, Dhamara
- Maa Tarini Guest House, Dhamara

== See also ==
- Dhamara Fishing Harbour
- Maa Dhamarai Temple
- Dhamra Airport
- Dhamra Port
- Dhamra River
- Dhamra LNG Terminal

== Legend ==
The temple of the Goddess Maa Dhamarai is located in the town. Some say that the goddess was brought from Sri Lanka by a local merchant who frequently traded with that island. Others say that she came from a place named Satabhaya. She was thrown into the sea by her sisters who were angered by her pure vegetarianism, and was found floating by some fishermen who brought her to Dhamra. After an earlier temple had been destroyed, the present temple was built over a ten-year period, opening around 1990.
