= Bhagirath Birabar =

Raja of Talcher from 1778 to 1846

- Raja

Raja of Talcher
- Reign: 1778 – 1846
- Predecessor: Nimai Charan Champati Birabar
- Successor: Dayanidhi Birabar
- Died: 1846
- House: Talcher
- Dynasty: Gajapati

Bhagirath Birabar was the Raja of Talcher from 1778 until his death in 1846.

== Reign ==
Upon the death of Nimai Charan Champati Birabar without any issue in 1778, the officials of the state placed him on the vacant throne of Talcher, claiming that he had been adopted by the deceased. At the time of his accession, he was a minor. His ascension to the throne led to some turmoil, so he left the state for a short time but returned soon after. He ruled the state till 1846 under the guidance of his minister Vighneswar Raiguru. He built the temple of Jagannath at Talcher using huge stones. He also built the temple of Ramchandra at Bijigol and constructed many more temples.

== Death ==
He died in 1846 and was succeeded by Dayanidhi Birabar.
