= Hrudaya Chandra =

Raja of Talcher from 1945 to 1970

- Raja

Raja of Talcher
- Reign: 7 November 1945 – 11 September 1970
- Coronation: 7 November 1945
- Investiture: 20 March 1946
- Predecessor: Kishore Chandra
- Successor: Soubhagya Chandra
- Born: 27 February 1902
- Died: 11 November 1970 (aged 68)
Names
- Hrudaya Chandra Birabar Harichandan
- House: Talcher
- Dynasty: Gajapati
- Father: Kishore Chandra

Hrudaya Chandra Birabar Harichandan was the Raja of Talcher from 1945 until his death in 1970.

== Early life ==
He was born on 27 February 1902 to Kishore Chandra. He was educated at Revenshaw College in Cuttack. Following the completion of his education, he was put in charge of the judiciary in Talcher. He was appointed as a state magistrate and assistant session judge. He served as district and session judge in Talcher for many years before he came to the throne.

== Reign ==
Following the death of his father on 7 November 1945 he succeeded him as the Raja of Talcher. On 20 March 1946, a durbar was held at Talcher, where he was formally invested as the ruler. On the occasion, H. J. Todd presented him with a kharita from the Governor-General of India, sent on behalf of King-Emperor George VI. He ruled for hardly two years. During his rule, Talcher was merged with Odisha on 1 January 1948.

== Personal life ==
He married the second daughter of the Raja of Bodogodo in Ganjam.

== Death ==
He died on 11 September 1970.
