= Kishore Chandra =

Raja of Talcher from 1891 to 1945

- Raja
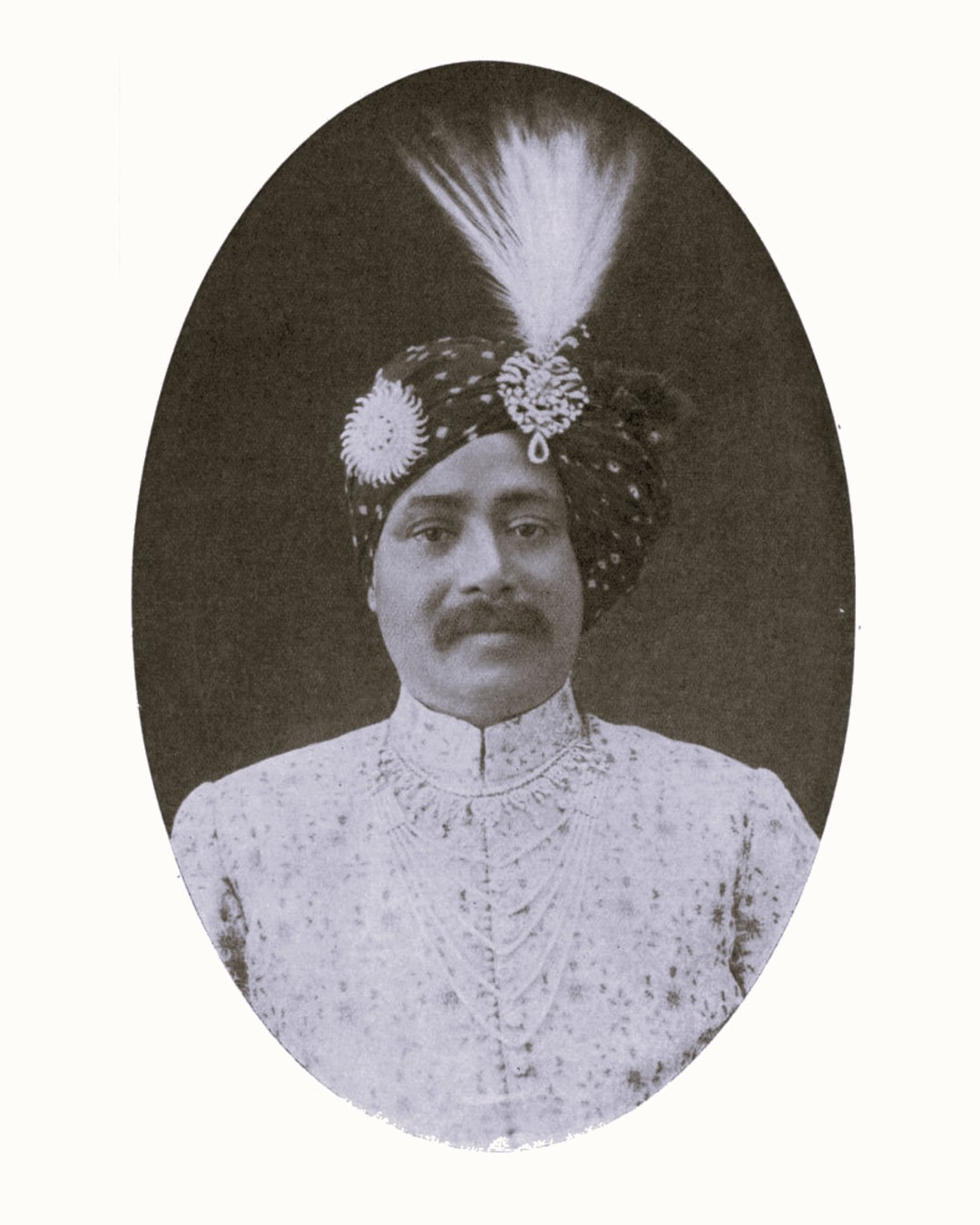

Raja of Talcher
- Reign: 18 December 1891 – 7 November 1945
- Investiture: 9 July 1901
- Predecessor: Ramchandra Birabar
- Successor: Hrudaya Chandra
- Born: 9 July 1880
- Died: 7 November 1945 (aged 65)
Names
- Kishore Chandra Birabar Harichandan
- House: Talcher
- Dynasty: Gajapati

Kishore Chandra Birabar Harichandan was the Raja of Talcher from 1891 until his death in 1945.

== Early life ==
He was born on 9 July 1880 to Ramchandra Birabar. He was educated at Ravenshaw College, Cuttack.

== Succession ==
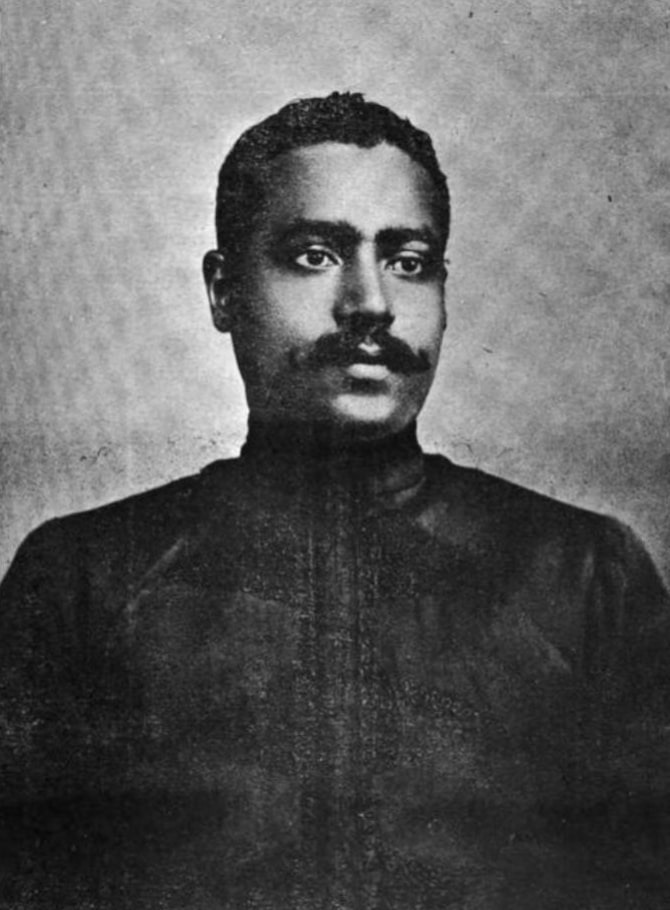
Kishore Chandra

He succeeded his father as the Raja of Talcher on 18 December 1891. Owing to his minority on the occasion, the state was placed under the court of wards. He was granted full administrative powers on 9 July 1901.

== Reign ==
The administration of state was carried out under his personal supervision. He improved and conducted it on modern lines. He was easily accessible to all his subjects and patiently listened to those who sought redress from him. His state was rich in mineral resources, especially coal, mica, limestone, building stone, etc. In 1906, he got a sample of coal from Talcher tested in Kolkata and invited applications for leasing mines of coal, mica, and iron. He gave 8 mi (20.7 km²) of his state coal resources on lease. During his reign, the income of Talcher increased from 82,353 rupees in 1900–01 to 5,73,083 rupees in 1934–35, and during the same period, its expenditure rose from 73,047 rupees to 2,95,772 rupees. Expenditure on education increased from 1,775 rupees in 1900–01 to 18,344 rupees in 1934–35, and expenditure on sanitation rose from 857 rupees to 8,517 rupees. He raised the wages for both skilled and unskilled labor up to six times. He opened a zoo to collect, protect, and breed endangered animals. He introduced a series of administrative and constitutional reforms in his states. He introduced three Byabastha Parisadas in Talcher during the year 1939 with 50% elected members. He opened schools and a workshop at Talcher. He opened Kishore Chandra Sahitya Samaj, a literary institution.

== Personal life ==
He married the fourth daughter of Basu Deb Sudhal Deb, the Raja of Bamra, and had two sons and a daughter. His daughter was born on 10 December 1900. His eldest son, Hrudaya Chandra, was born on 27 February 1902, and his second son, Pramod Chandra Deb, was born on 12 September 1903.

== Death ==
He died on 7 November 1945 and was succeeded by his son Hrudaya Chandra.
