= Ramchandra Birabar Harichandan =

Raja of Talcher from 1873 to 1891

- Raja

Raja of Talcher
- Reign: 8 November 1873 – 18 December 1891
- Predecessor: Dayanidhi Birabar
- Successor: Kishore Chandra
- Born: 22 December 1856
- Died: 18 December 1891 (aged 34)
- House: Talcher
- Dynasty: Gajapati
- Father: Dayanidhi Birabar

Ramchandra Birabar Harichandan was the Raja of Talcher from 1873 until his death in 1891.

== Birth ==
He was born on 22 December 1856 to Dayanidhi Birabar Harichandan.

== Reign ==
He succeeded as the Raja of Talcher as a minor on 8 November 1873. He started land settlement and, in 1879, established courts of justice, an accounts section, tauzi, and nizarat. He established police stations at Talcher, Serampore, Kansamunda, Bajrakote, and Gahami. He also established a jail and the departments of public works, education, health, excise, and forests. He set up a middle vernacular school and a middle girls' school. He established a hospital. He insisted on regular maintenance of records as well as observance of official rules. In 1887, he built the Victoria Hall and Circuit House to commemorate the Diamond Jubilee of Queen Victoria.

== Literature and science ==
Ramchandra was a scholar of history and geography and a fond of Sanskrit literature. He set up a Sanskrit toll at Talcher, and his durbar was attended by Sanskrit scholars. He was also a writer in Odia. He translated the Gita into Odia and authored Bharatara Sankhipta Itihas, a book on the history of India, which was prescribed as a textbook for middle vernacular classes in Odisha. He wrote commentaries on Manu Sanhita and Parasara Sanhita.

== Personal life ==
He was a man of religious and charitable disposition. Radhanath Ray had dedicated his Usha to Ramchandra. In his dedication, Radhanath wrote of him in the following words:

I have never seen such a pious ruler elsewhere who regularly feeds a good number of beggars and destitutes from his granary.

— Radhanath Ray, Usha

== Death ==
He died on 18 December 1891, and his son, Kishore Chandra, succeeded to his title.
