= Dayanidhi Birabar Harichandan =

Raja of Talcher 1846/1873

- Raja

Raja of Talcher
- Reign: c. 1846 – c. 1873
- Predecessor: Bhagirath Birabar
- Successor: Ramchandra Birabar
- Born: c. 1801
- Died: c. 1873
- House: Talcher
- Dynasty: Gajapati

Dayanidhi Birabar Harichandan was the Raja of Talcher from 1846 until his death in 1873.

== Reign ==
He helped the British troops in 1847 to quell the rebellion of the Raja of Angul. In recognition of this, the British Government conferred upon him the title of Mahendra Bahadur, along with the gift of a Khilat and an elephant. He performed somayajna, which lasted for twenty-one days in 1854. At the conclusion of the yajna, he was bestowed with the title of Rajarshi. When the Orissa famine of 1866 occurred, he took prompt and comprehensive measures to provide sustenance for his subjects.

== Personal life ==
He had three wives and two concubines. He had given his concubines two villages. He devoted most of his time to studying scriptures and religious texts.

== Death ==
He died in 1873 and was succeeded by Ramchandra Birabar Harichandan.
