= Chakradhar Behera =

Revolutionary from Odisha, India

- ଚକ୍ରଧର ବେହେରା
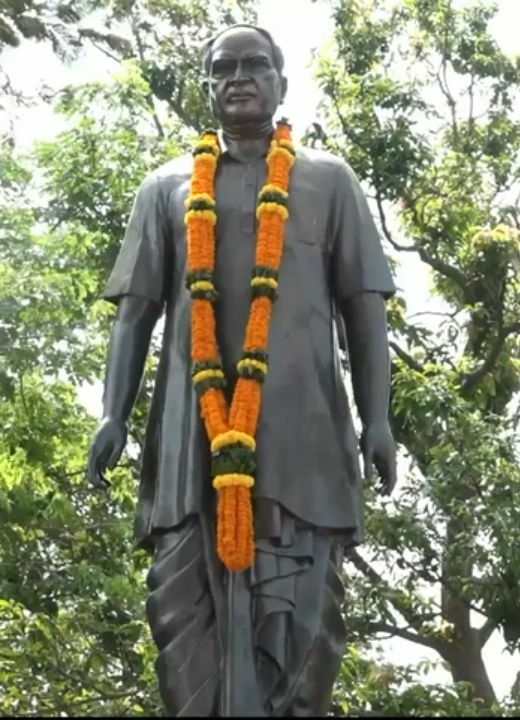
- Statue of Biplabi Chakradhar Behera in Bhubaneswar (This Statue is Created by Sculptor Jayanta Kumar Das)

1st Member: Odisha Legislative Assembly (before Independence)
- In office 1937–1946
- Preceded by: Post established
- Constituency: East Bhadrak

1st Member: Odisha Legislative Assembly (after Independence)
- In office 1952–1957
- Preceded by: Post established
- Succeeded by: Nanda Kishore Jena
- Constituency: Chandabali

Personal details
- Born: Chakradhar Behera; 16 July 1894; Ankapada village, Bhadrak district, Bengal Presidency, British India
- Died: 1 January 1973 (aged 78)
- Political party: Indian National Congress
- Occupation: Freedom Fighter, Politician

Chakradhar Behera (1894–1973), popularly known as Biplabi (Insurgent), was a leader of the Peasant Rebellion or Movement against the combined strength of British government and the king of the Kanika estate. He was also a politician of the Indian National Congress from Odisha.

== Early life ==
Chakradhar Behera was born on 16 July 1894 in an Odia Hindu Gopal (Yadav) family at Ankapada village, Bhadrak district of Odisha. He passed his matriculation from Bhadrak high school in the year 1918 and then the king of the Kanika estate appointed him as his accountant.

== Kanika Movement leadership ==
In October 1921, Behera joined the Non-co-operation movement. In December 1921 the British authorities decided to undertake a new illegal settlement of revenue collations. This became a constant source of friction between the british subordinate king and the tenants. At the time he worked as an accountant of the king, he resigned from his post and organised agitation against the Raja so as to secure the rights of the tenants. Under his leadership a meeting was organised in January 1922. The Raja of Kanika and British authorities wholly co-operated with each other in suppressing the tenants. He bowed neither to the Kanika Raja nor to British authorities and then the high court arrested him on 29 June 1930 for having taken the lead in the no tax campaign.

However, this movement worked from 1922 until Independence under his leadership for more than twenty-five years. It was a part of the Non-cooperation movement, and was both anti-feudal and anti-imperialiastic in character.
