= Nimai Charan Champati Birabar =

Raja of Talcher from 1774 to 1778

- Raja

Raja of Talcher
- Reign: 1774 – 1778
- Predecessor: Ramachandra Birabar
- Successor: Bhagirath Birabar
- Died: 1778
- House: Talcher
- Dynasty: Gajapati

Nimai Charan Champati Birabar Harichandan was the Raja of Talcher from 1774 until his death in 1778.

== Biography ==
When Ramchandra Birabar died childless in 1774, he succeeded him as the Raja of Talcher. Despite his best efforts, he was unable to alleviate the famine conditions in Talcher. His reign was short-lived as he died in 1778. He was succeeded by Bhagirath Birabar.
