= Talcher State =

Coordinates: 20°57′11″N 85°13′48″E

- Princely State of British India
- 1471–1948
- Flag

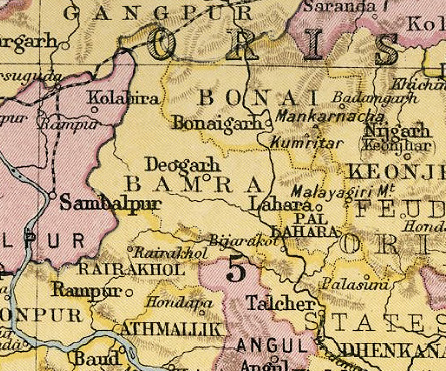
- Talcher State in the Imperial Gazetteer of India
- Area
- 1,033 km^{2} (399 sq mi)
- History
  - Established: 1471
  - Accession to the Union of India: 1948
Succeeded by
India

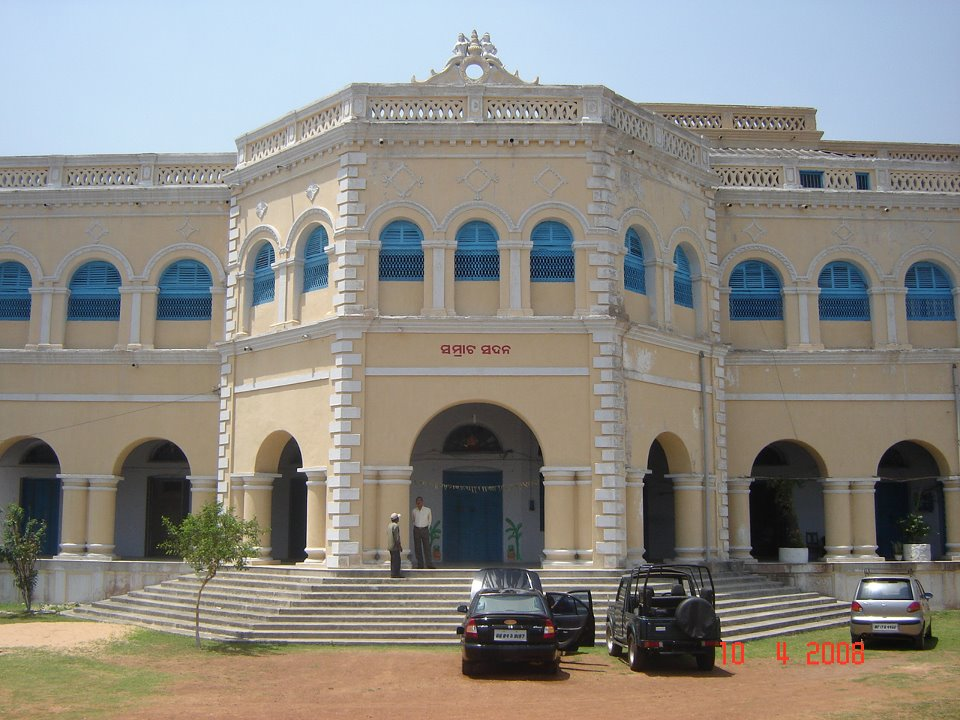
Talcher Palace, Front view

Talcher State was one of the princely states of India during the British Raj. Talcher City in Angul District was the capital of the state and the seat of the Raja's residence. Its last ruler signed the accession to the Indian Union in 1948.

== History ==
The origins of the state of Talcher go back to 1471 CE during the reign of Purushottama Deva of the Gajapati Empire in the region when the overlordship of Bhimanagari was established by Narahari Singh. In the late 16th century under the reign of Padmanabha Birabara Harichandan, the kingdom was renamed as Talcher after the name of the family goddess Taleshwari in 1578.

The state's accession to the Indian Union was signed by its last ruler Hrudaya Chandra on 1 January 1948.

== Rulers ==
The rulers of Talcher:

- Narahari Singh (1471 - 1480 CE)
- Udayanarayana Singh (1480 - 1520)
- Govind Charan Singh (1520 - 1527)
- ...
- Padmanabha Birabara Harichandan (1575 - 1598)
- Chakradhar Birabara Harichandan (1598 - 1651)
- Gopinath Birabara Harichandan (1651 - 1711)
- Ramchandra Birabara Harichandan (1711 - 1729)
- Pitambar Birabara Harichandan (1729 - 1740)
- Lal Singh (1740 - 1752)
- Krishna Chandra Birabara Harichandan (1752 - ...)
- ...
- Ramchandra (Ayadi) Birabara Harichandan (1766 - 1774)
- Nimai Charan Champati Birabara Harichandan (1774 - 1778)
- Bhagirathi Birabara Harichandan (1778 - 1846)
- Dayanidhi Birabara Harichandan Mahapatra (1846 - 1873)
- Ramchandra Deba Birabara Harichandan Mahapatra (1873 - 18 Dec 1891)
- Kishor Chandra Deba Birabara Harichandan Mahapatra (18 Dec 1891 - 7 Nov 1945)
- Hrudaya Chandra Deba Birabara Harichandan Mahapatra (7 Nov 1945 – 1 January 1948)

=== Titular ===
- Hrudaya Chandra Deba Birabara Harichandan Mahapatra (1 January 1948 - 11 September 1970)
- Soubhagya Chandra Deba Birabara Harichandan Mahapatra (11 September 1970 - 14 March 2008)
- Rajendra Chandra Deba Birabara Harichandan Mahapatra (14 March 2008 - current)

== See also ==
- Eastern States Agency
- Talcher
