= Eram massacre =

1942 Indian historical event

Eram Massacre
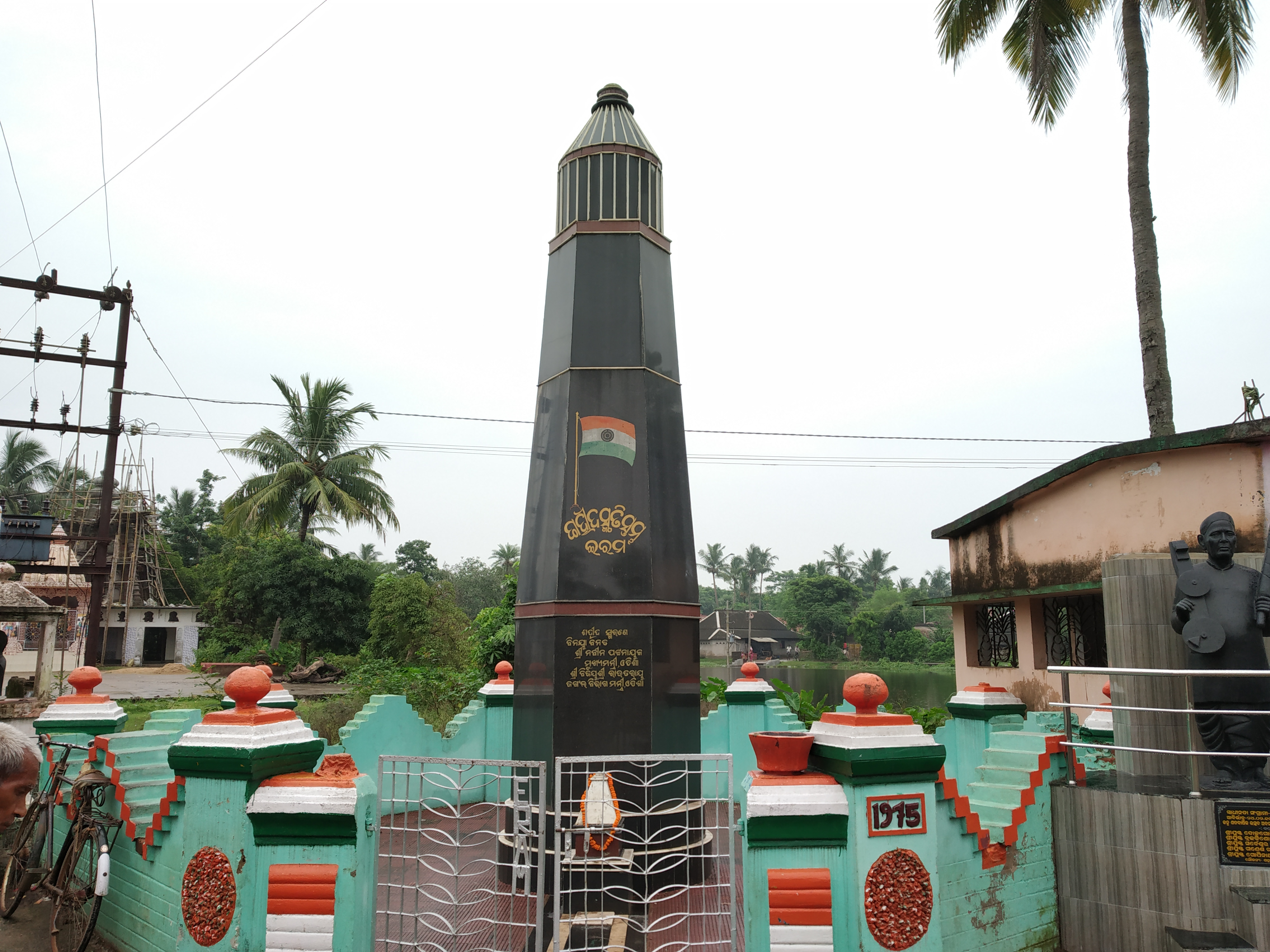
- Eram's Martyr Memorial

- Location of Bhadrak in India
- Location: 21.0586°N 86.6773°E; Basudevpur, Bhadrak, Odisha, India
- Date: 28 September 1942; 17:37 (6:30 p.m.)
- Target: Gathering against the British rulers
- Attack type: massacre
- Deaths: 29
- Injuries: ~ 60
- Perpetrator: British Indian Army unit under the DSP Kunjabihari.
- No. of participants: 5000

Eram is a village in Basudevpur, Bhadrak in the Indian state of Odisha. It plays an important role in the history of the Indian Independence movement. It is known as Rakta Tirtha Eram (The Pilgrim of Blood) and the second Jallianwala Bagh of India.

== Geography ==
Eram is located in Bhadrak district of Odisha and is 8 km away from Basudebpur village of Bhadrak district. Elam is surrounded by the Bay of Bengal, Gamoi and Kansbans rivers and thick jungles.

== Indian independence movement ==
Eram was remote, inaccessible and far from cities. the place was sleepy and silent to reach. From 1920, Eram was a secret place for Utkal Congress meetings, Gopabandhu Das, Harekrushna Mahatab and other Congress leaders used Eram as a place for public meetings to share messages about Quit India Movement or Non-cooperation Movement of Mahatma Gandhi and to propagate the Gandhian ideals of freedom struggle.

== 1942 mass attack ==
On 28 September 1942 a gathering protested against the British Raj and prepared a course of action. Under the leadership of Kamala Prasad Kar a crowd of 5000 people gathered at Eram Melana ground. Afraid of this gathering, a police force from Basudebpur police station, led by DSP Kunjabihari Mohanty march towards Eram. DSP Kunjabihari Mohanty acted as General Dyer and opened fire on the gathering at 6:30 pm. Within few minutes 304 shots were discharged against the crowd, who were agitating in a peaceful way. Since the field was bounded on three sides, no one was able to escape from the fusillade. 29 persons died on the spot and 56 were injured. Among the dead was Pari Bewa, the only lady martyr of Odisha. For this incident, Eram is popularly known as Rakta Tirtha Eram (The Pilgrim of Blood).

== Martyrs list ==
- Pari Bewa, Eram, Basudebpur
- Gopal Chandra Das, Padhnuan
- Bishwanath Das, Padhuan
- Bijuli Das, Padhuan
- Hrushikesh Behera, Padhuan
- Madan Palai, Padhuan
- Ballahaba Behera, Padhuan
- Magha Mahalika, Padhuan
- Bhua Majhi, Padhuan
- Kali Ajhi, Padhuan-Kumarpur
- Radhu Ahalika, Padhuan-Muladiha
- Dhruba Charana Dey, Padhuan
- Basudeb Sahu, Padhuan
- Hari Behera, Padhuan
- Dibakar Panigrahi, Guda-Kesagadia
- Krushna Chandra Swain, Padhuan-Kumarpur
- Bhaban Rout, Padhuan-Nandapura
- Nidhi Mahalika, Padhuan
- Brundaban Panda, Padhuan
- Upa Mallika, Nuangan
- Krupasindhu Behera, Sankharu
- Rama Majhi, Padhuan-Kumarpur
- Mani Behera, Padhuan
- Kati Sahu, Iswarapur
- Ratnakar Pani, Sudarsanpur
- Mani Pradhana, Suan-Sudarsanpur
- Pari Das, Suan
- Sankar Mallika, Adhunan
- Gobinda Rout, Artungan
- Panu Dash, Nuagaon

In the memory of Martyrs, A martyrs’ memorial was built in Eram. It is one of the tourism places in Odisha.
