= Pari Bewa =

Indian women freedom fighter

- Born: Pari Bewa; Eram, Basudevpur, Bhadrak
- Died: 28 September 1942; Eram
- Known for: Martyr of Quit India Movement

Pari Bewa, was a female freedom fighter from Odisha, India. Born in Eram, Bewa had a very important role in the quit India movement. She is regarded as the only female martyr of Odisha.

== Personal life ==
Bewa was born in undivided Balasore or Eram which is now situated in Bhadrak. Bewa had no formal education. She had a personal attachment to their land, which led her to participate in the Indian independence movement.

== Eram Massacre ==
On 28 September 1942, there was a huge gathering at Eram to protest against the British Raj and to prepare a plan of action for fighting the British. Afraid of this gathering, a police force from Basudebpur police station, led by DSP Kunjabihari Mohanty, marched towards Eram. As happened in Jaliyanawala Bagh 1919, DSP Kunjabihari Mohanty acted as General Dyer did then, and opened fire on the huge gathering at 6:30 PM. Within a few minutes 304 shots were discharged against the crowd, who were protesting British rule peacefully. The field was bounded on three sides, therefore, no one was able to escape from the field. Within minutes 29 people were killed, and 56 were injured. Bewa was among the protesters who died that day.
