= Dhamra River =

River in India

Coordinates: 20°47′N 86°58′E

Dhamara is a joint stream in Odisha that is formed by the confluence of the Brahmani and Baitarani rivers south of the town of Chandabali. It lies in the Bhadrak district and empties into the Bay of Bengal. To the north of its mouth is the Dhamra Port and near the mouth is the Gahiramatha sanctuary, a nesting site for olive ridley sea turtles.

The river's mouth is as wide as 4 kilometres (2.5 mi), and it enters the sea through two distinct river channels separated by an island formation called Kalibhanja. The two channels are further separated by another island formation in the sea called Kanika Sands which is approximately 8 kilometres (5 mi) wide.

The Bhitarkanika wildlife sanctuary, famous for its estuarine crocodiles, lies on the Dhamra estuary. Wheeler Island, a DRDO missile launch centre is located off the mouth of the Dhamra in the Bay of Bengal.
