= Bhadrakali Temple, Aharapada =

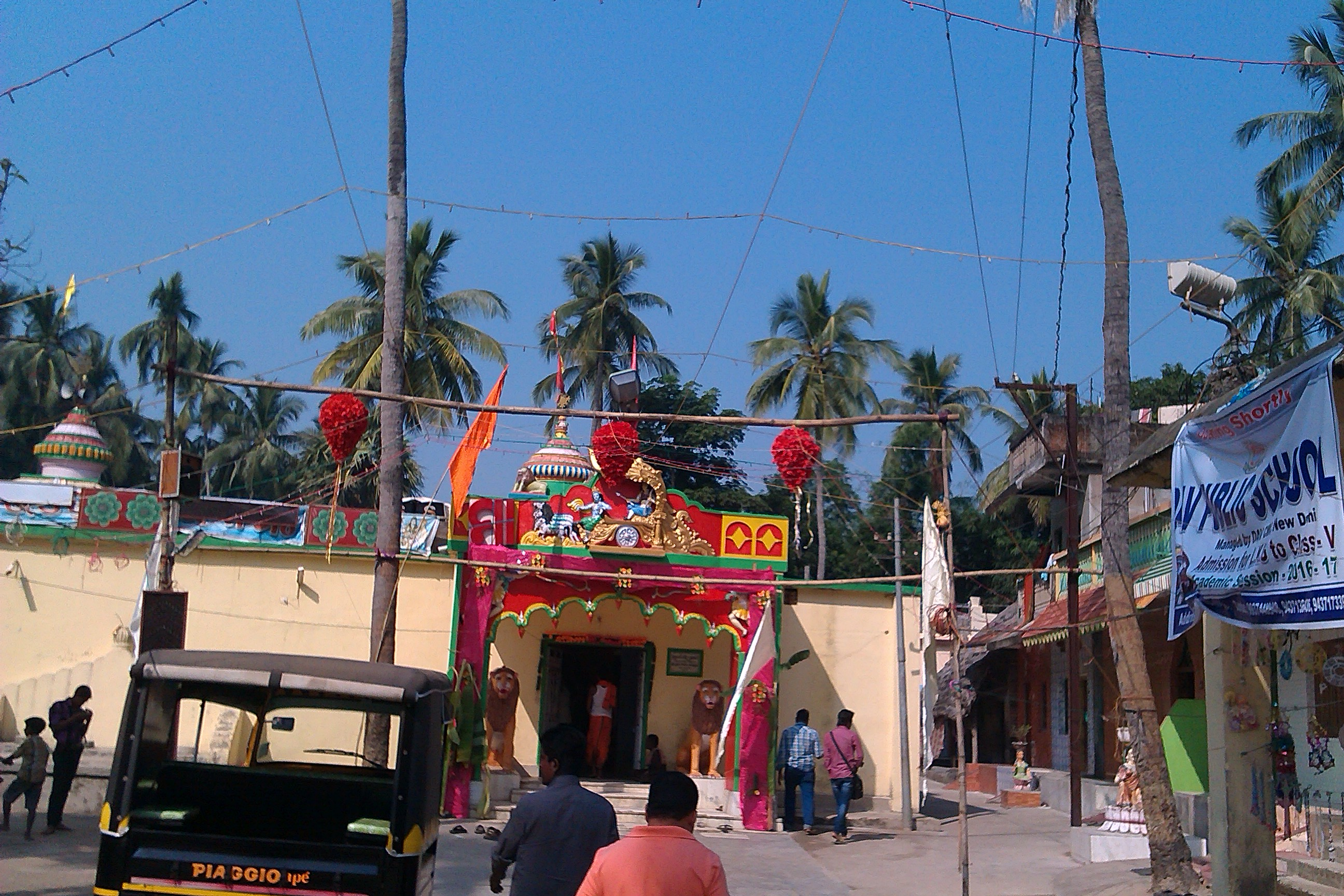

- Location within Odisha

Religion
- Affiliation: Hinduism

Location
- Coordinates: 21.015234°N 86.536719°E

Bhadrakali Temple is located in the outskirts of the revenue village Aharapada, Bhadrak district, Odisha, India. This temple is situated at a distance of 8 km away from Bhadrak town in the southwest direction. The popular belief is that the name of the town was derived from the name of the deity.

== Goddess ==
The statue of the goddess is of black granite and is seated in lotus posture on a lion. The temple remains open for visitors and devotees every day from 6:30 am to 1 pm and again from 3 pm to 9:30 pm. As per the nomenclature of the goddess one tends to believe that it is the goddess Kali who is being worshiped in this Bhadrakali Pitha. However, since the deity is seated on a lion, one school of thought has opined that the goddess must be Durga. According to legends originally Bhadrakali was worshiped inside a cave in the Meghasana hill of Mayurbhanj district by a sage named Tapasa Rushi. After the death of the sage, one of his pupil namely Bhadranatha brought the goddess to Bhunyamahalla of Bhadrak. To protect the deity from Kalapahad, she was again transferred to present place by the Dikshits. Mostly during Vijaya Dashami and Deepavali crowds gather for seeking blessings of benevolent mother.
