= Basudevpur =

Basudevpur Basudevpur
- Town
- Location in Odisha, India Basudevpur (India)
- Coordinates: 21.14°N 86.74°E
- Country: India
- State: Odisha
- District: Bhadrak

Government
  - Type: Municipality
  - Body: Basudevpur Municipality
- Elevation: 3 m (9.8 ft)

Population (2011)
  - Total: 33,690

Languages
  - Official: Odia
- Time zone: UTC+5:30 (IST)
- PIN: 756125
- Vehicle registration: OD
- Website: basudevpurmunicipality.in

Basudevpur is a town and a Municipality in Bhadrak District in the state of Odisha, India. It is the second most populated (5000k) town in Bhadrak District. This town has major role in the path of prosperity of Bhadrak District. This includes Rakta Tirtha Eram in Basudevpur, where about 30 people along with a woman named Pari Bewa were killed by the British police, DSP Kunjabihari Mohanty while fighting for independence. CHC Basudevpur State No 1 Medical By kayakalpa Award 2020 .

== Basudevpur Municipality ==
Basudevpur Municipality is in the District of Bhadrak, Odisha born on dt. 24.11.1974 as Notified Area Council, upgraded as Municipality on dt. 24.02.2014 having an area of 47.78 square km and population of 33,689 as per Census-2011, consisting of 23 Nos. of Wards and 6599 households. It is geographically situated is at an elevation of 3 m (9 feet). It is located at 21.14°N 86.74°E. It is a distance of 40 km from the District headquarters northeast and 7 km from Sahid Tirtha, Eram circumscribed by the Bay of Bengal at east, Gamei River to the north, Narasinghpur GP at west and Binayakpur GP to the south. Read More...

== Geography ==
Basudevpur is located at 21.14°N 86.74°E. It has an average elevation of 3 metres (9 feet). The geographical location of this town has most favorable surviving elements from every aspect like climatic condition, surrounding environments, education, communication, transportation, agriculture, business and so on.

== Demographics ==
As of the 2011 Census of India, Basudevpur had a population of 219,108. Males constitute 52% of the population and females 48%. Basudevpur has an average literacy rate of 60%, higher than the national average of 59.5%; with 60% of the males and 40% of females literate. 14% of the population is under 6 years of age.

== Politics ==
The current MLA from Basudevpur Assembly Constituency is Ashok Das of [National Congress Party] .The former MLA Bishnubrata Routray of BJD., who won the seat in 2019. The former MLA from Basudevpur Assembly Constituency is Bijoyshree Routray of BJD, who won the seat in State elections of 2014, 2009 and also in 2004 and 2000 and earlier representing JD in 1995 and in 1990. Other previous MLAs from this seat were Madhu Sadan Panigrahi of INC(I) in 1985, Jagabandhu Das of INC(I) in 1980, Nilmoni Routray of JNP in 1977.

The region has a significant political history and is the birthplace of notable leaders, including former chief ministers of Odisha Nilamani Routray and Dr. Harekrushna Mahatab

== Educational institutes ==
Atal Bihari College is a college located in Basudevpur for higher education. Trupti Women's College is established in 2000 for educational upliftment of women in Basudevpur. Named after Dr Trupti Dash, a paediatrician, who along with Mr Madhab C Dash, a charted accountant of Sugo village of Basudebpur subdivision are the main donors for this college. There are two high schools, known as Atal Bihari High School and Government Girls High School Basudevpur, for higher schooling of Basudevpur subdivision.

Basudevpur is part of Bhadrak (Lok Sabha constituency).
