= Bhadrak railway station =

Railway station in Odisha, India

Bhadrak
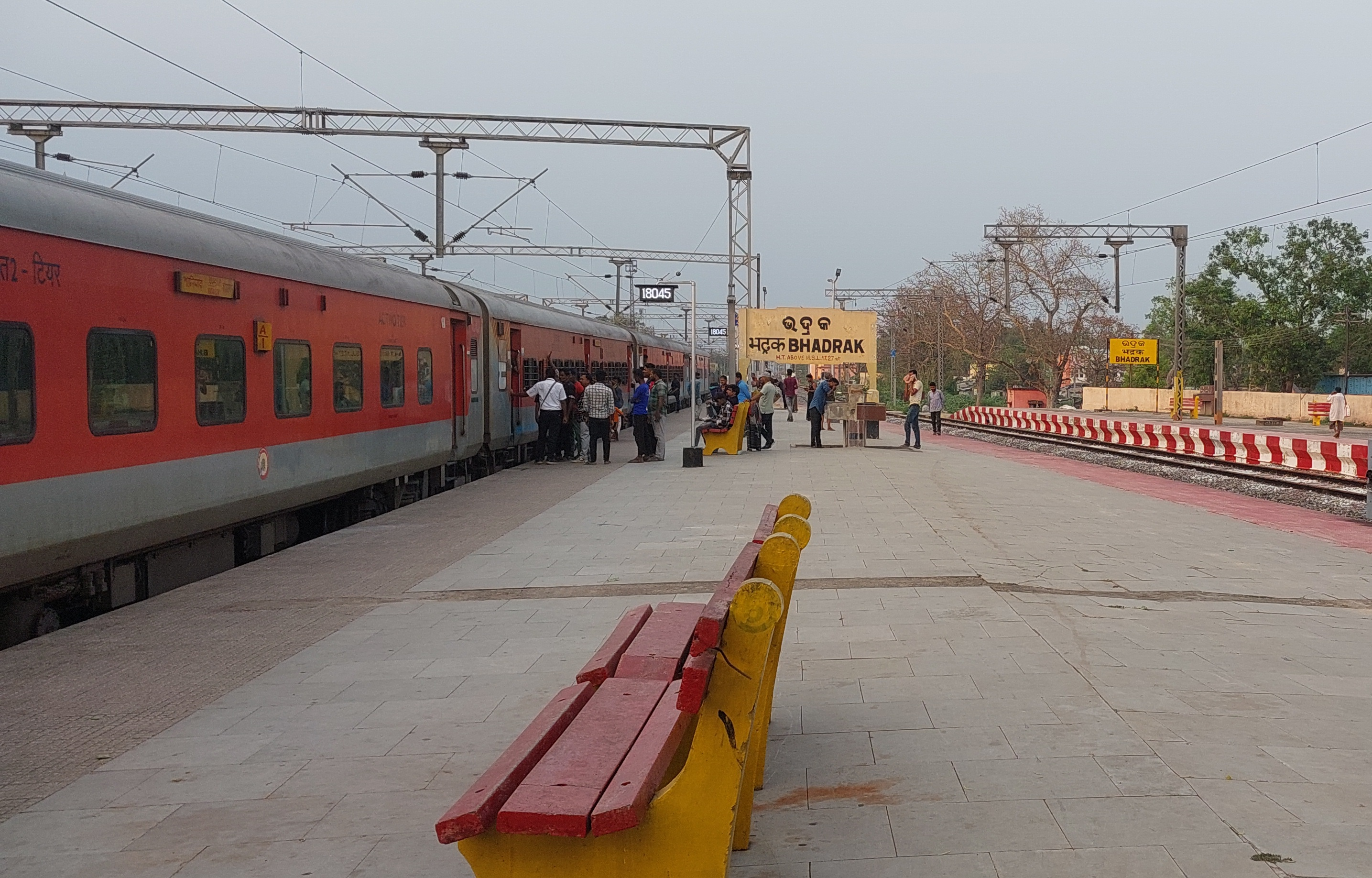

General information
- Location: Bhadrak, Odisha; India
- Coordinates: 21°03′36″N 86°30′00″E
- Elevation: 23 metres (75 ft)
- System: Indian Railways station
- Owner: Indian Railways
- Operator: East Coast Railway
- Platforms: 5
- Tracks: 6

Construction
- Structure type: Standard on ground
- Parking: Yes
- Cycle facilities: No
- Accessible: Yes

Other information
- Status: Functioning
- Station code: BHC
- Division(s): Khurda Road

History
- Opened: 1896; 130 years ago
- Rebuilt: Oct-Dec 2024 (Increase in platforms as well as tracks number).

Passengers
- 4726+
Location
- Location within Odisha Location within India

Bhadrak railway station is a major passenger railway station serves Bhadrak district in Indian state of Odisha. It is situated on the howrah chennai main railline. It comes under (NSG3) railway stations category of India.It is located a bit far from the city center, but is accessible by vehicles, public transport etc.

== Outline ==
Bhadrak railway station is located at an altitude of 23 metres (75 ft). It functions within the jurisdiction of Khurda Road railway division. It is the nearest railhead for Dhamra Port.

It was renovated recently in the year 2018-2019 and got a brand new look and the platform length also increased too.

== History ==
During the period 1893 to 1896, 1,287 km (800 mi) of the East Coast State Railway, from Vijayawada to Cuttack was built and opened to traffic, and construction of the Vijayawada–Chennai link in 1899 enabled the through running of trains along the eastern coast of India. Bengal Nagpur Railway was working on both the Howrah–Kharagpur and Kharagpur–Cuttack lines, completed the bridge over the Rupnarayan in 1900 and the Mahanadi in 1901, thus completing the through connection between Chennai and Kolkata.

== Passenger amenities ==
Bhadrak railway station has computerized reservation system (CRS), dormitory, cloak room, refreshment room, tourist information counter, post office (RMS) sliding steps for specially abled persons and ATM.
