= Bhadrak district =

- District of Odisha
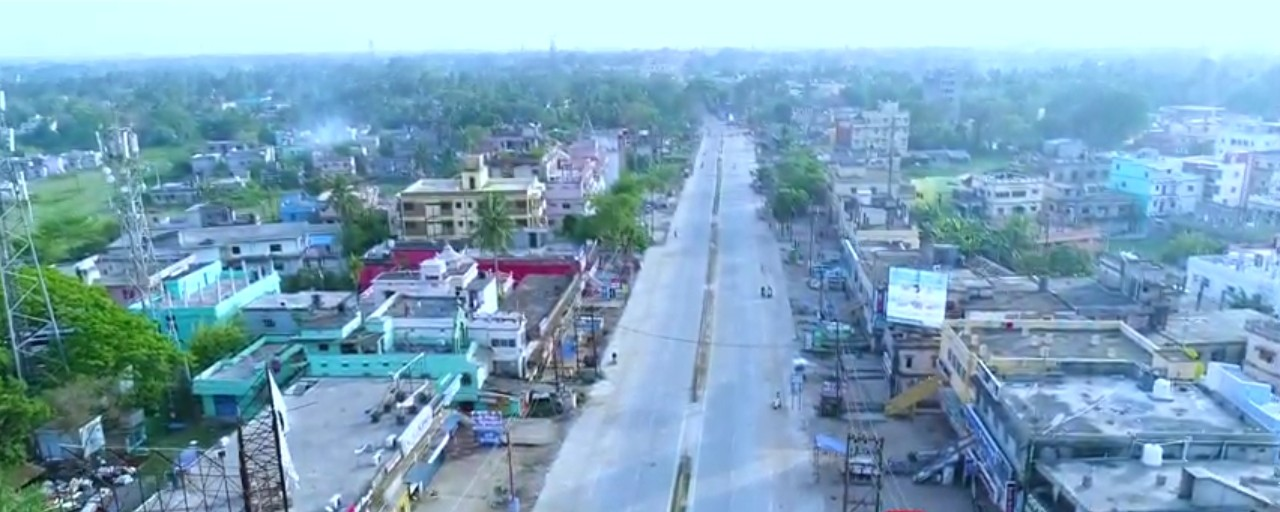
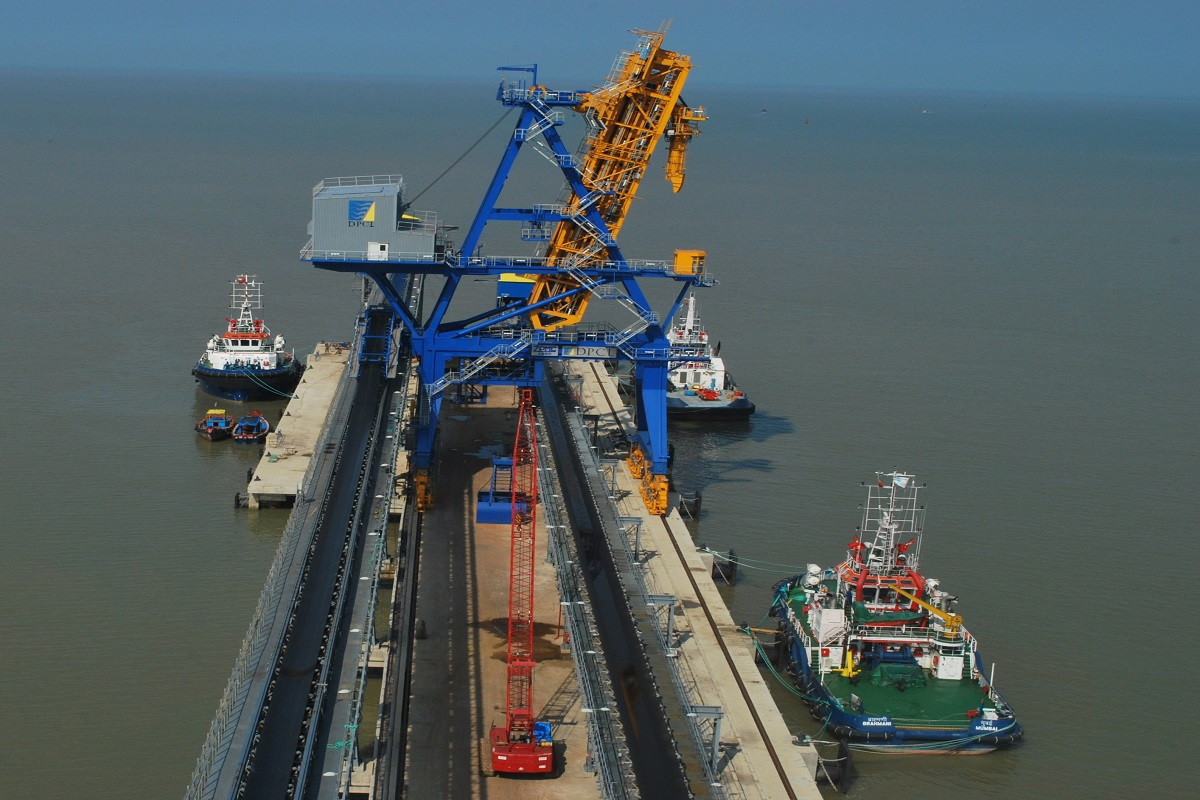
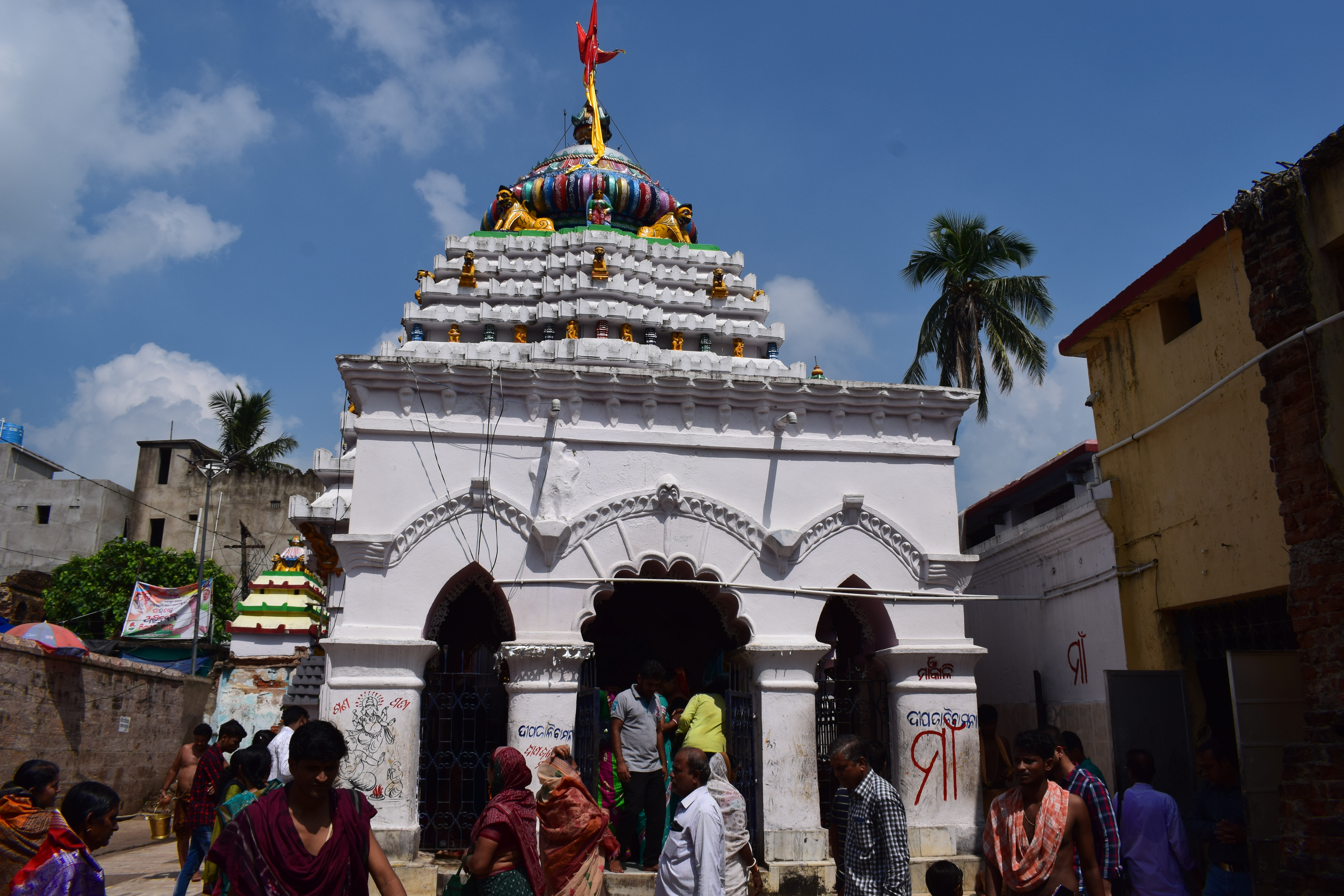
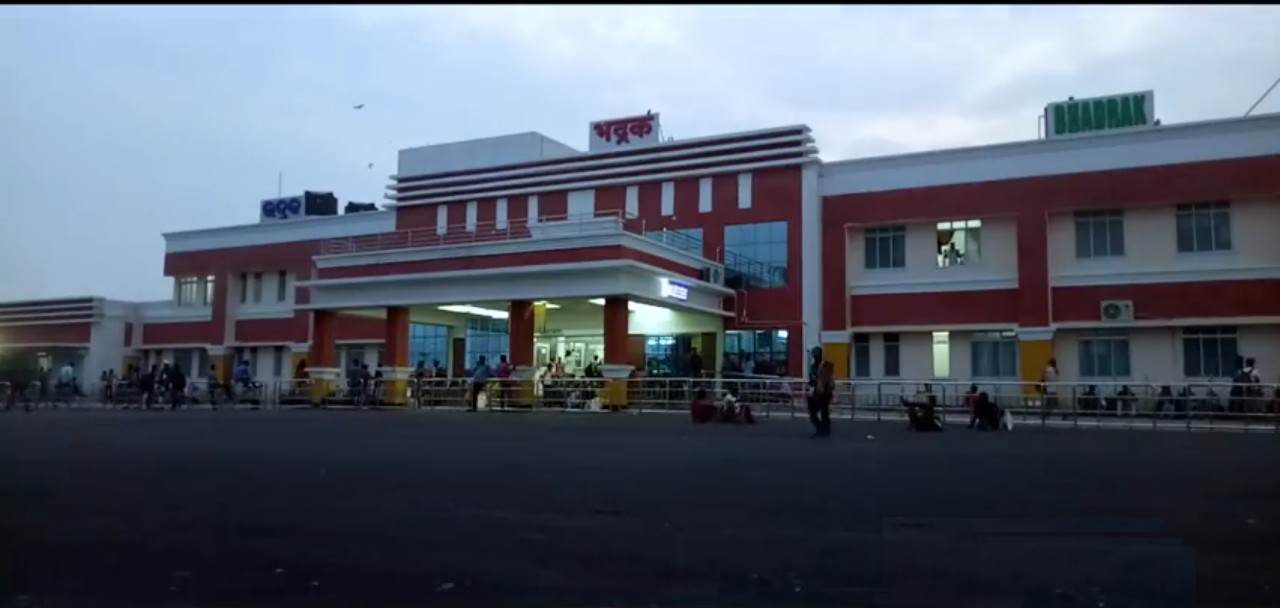
- From Top; Left to Right: Bhadrak City view, Dhamra Port, Akhandalamani Temple and Bhadrak Railway Station
- Interactive map of Bhadrak district
- Coordinates: 21.0667°N 86.5000°E
- Country: India
- State: Odisha
- Established: 1 April 1993
- Named after: Bhadrakali
- Headquarters: Bhadrak

Government
  - Member of Parliament: Avimanyu Sethi (BJP)
  - District Magistrate and Collector: Dilip Routrai IAS
  - Superintendent of Police: Manoj Rout OPS

Area
  - Total: 2,505 km^{2} (967 sq mi)

Population (2011)
  - Total: 1,506,337
  - Rank: 12
  - Density: 601/km^{2} (1,560/sq mi)

Languages
  - Official: Odia, English
- Time zone: UTC+5:30 (IST)
- Telephone code: 06784
- Vehicle registration: OD-22
- Sex ratio: 981 ♂/♀
- Literacy: 83.25%
- Precipitation: 1,427.9 millimetres (56.22 in)
- Avg. summer temperature: 48 °C (118 °F)
- Avg. winter temperature: 17 °C (63 °F)
- Website: bhadrak.nic.in

Bhadrak district is a district of Odisha state in eastern India. Bhadrak city is the headquarters and the largest city of the district.

== Origin of name ==
The district is named after Bhadrakali, a deity in Hinduism, whose temple is situated on bank of Salandi river, 8 km distant from the Bhadrak city.

== History ==
Bhadrak District, located in the Indian state of Odisha, holds a historical legacy dating back to the era of the Puranas, a period marked by maritime and agricultural prosperity in the region.

In the annals of Bhadrak's history, King Mukunda Dev stands as the final indigenous sovereign ruler of the region. However, after the year 1575, following the defeat of the Afghans by Raja Man Singh during the Mughal period, Bhadrak District underwent a transformation. It transitioned into a Subha and subsequently fell under the governance of the Nawabs of Bengal as the Mughals exerted their influence over the political landscape of Bhadrak.

Over time, Bhadrak District came under Maratha rule until the British Empire extended its dominion across the entirety of Odisha. This historical progression underscores the diverse and complex tapestry of Bhadrak's past, characterized by shifts in governance and significant events that left lasting imprints on the region's identity and heritage.

The city is known for being the place of the second Jallianawala Bagh of India. On September 28 1942, DSP Kunjabihari Mohanty ordered police to fire at protesters. At least 29 people, including Pari Bewa, were shot dead by British police in the Iram disctrict of Bhadrak. Bewa is known as a martyr of Odisha.

Bhadrak District boasts a wealth of historical sites and monuments. Among these, Palia stands out as the renowned location of the Biranchi Narayan Temple, while the Sri Radha Madanmohan Temple ranks as one of the district's most frequented religious sites. Notably, Aradi, situated just 10 kilometers from Chandabali, is celebrated for its Akhandalamani Temple.

On 1 April 1993, the Bhadrak District was established as an independent administrative entity, having been carved out from the Balasore District. This significant administrative change marked the district's emergence as a distinct and separate region within the state of Odisha, India.

== Administrative division ==
It consists of 1370 villages which constitute 7 Blocks. There are 6 urban bodies. They are Bhadrak and Basudevpur municipality and Dhamra, Chandabali, Dhamnagar and Agarpada NAC.

== Geography ==
The district has an area of 2,505 km^{2} (967 sq mi). Bhadrak town is 125 km (78 mi) from the state capital, Bhubaneswar. Salandi River passes by this district. The Baitarani flows by Chandabali town and falls into the Bay of Bengal at Dhamara.

== Economy ==
Agriculture is one of the main source of income for the district. Also many people in the coastal area, from Dhamara of Chandbali Block to Padhuan of Basudevpur Block, depend on upon Fishing and marine services. The major fishing harbors are located at Dhamara, Kasia & Chudamani. Many people are also involved in business and service sector.

== Notable sites ==
- Akhandalamani Temple is on the bank of river Baitarani, the Akhandalamani Temple is the abode of Lord Shiva. The Patana Mangala ( Lankeswari ) in Chatrapada village is famous for Mangala temple with the biggest pond of Odisha. Chief interest of the place is its legendary history. As the history runs, king Niladri Samara Singha Mohapatra started worshipping the God Akhandalamani some 350 years ago, when the black glazed granite stone was found underground and the king dreamt of the god. However the religious and historical significance with which the place is invested, constitute it to be a center of special interest in the tourism of Bhadrak. Moreover, the artistic carvings of the temple deserve special worth to the tourist. Surrounding the temple many fairs and festivals are organized, the chief among which is the Mahashivaratri. During this festival, tourists, including a vast chunk of pilgrims, flock into the core of the temple. On the month of Sravana, people from nationwide assemble here to pour the holy water on the Siva Linga and to offer their worship to Lord Shiva. The Akhandalamani Temple is the principal source of the profitable development of the tourism industry of Bhadrak.

== Transport ==
Bhadrak railway station is the biggest railway station of Bhadrak district and serves Bhadrak city. An important upcoming town in Bhadrak district is Dhamara, which is upcoming newly built mega-port of the district. New railway line from Bhadrak to Dhamra is constructed. Dhamra Airport is proposed to be built by the Dhamra Port Company Limited, 20 km from Dhamra Port

Also Chennai- Kolkata NH-16, State Highway 35, 53 and 57 pass through Bhadrak district, and also connect with NH-316A with Dhamara.

== Demographics ==
Historical population
Year	Pop.	±% p.a.
1901	461,056	—
1911	454,658	−0.14%
1921	422,890	−0.72%
1931	428,337	+0.13%
1941	448,387	+0.46%
1951	447,270	−0.02%
1961	576,842	+2.58%
1971	739,274	+2.51%
1981	895,081	+1.93%
1991	1,105,834	+2.14%
2001	1,333,749	+1.89%
2011	1,506,337	+1.22%
Source: Census of India

Religion in Bhadrak district (2011)
Religion	Percent
Hinduism	92.84%
Islam	6.92%
Other or not stated	0.24%

According to the 2011 census Bhadrak district has a population of 1,506,337, roughly equal to the nation of Gabon or the US state of Hawaii. This gives it a ranking of 332nd in India (out of a total of 640). The district has a population density of 601 inhabitants per square kilometre (1,560/sq mi) . Its population growth rate over the decade 2001–2011 was 12.95%. Bhadrak has a sex ratio of 981 females for every 1000 males, and a literacy rate of 83.25%. 12.34% of the population lives in urban areas. Scheduled Castes and Scheduled Tribes make up 22.23% and 2.02% of the population respectively.

Languages of Bhadrak district (2011)
1. Odia (90.6%)
2. Urdu (6.61%)
3. Bengali (1.46%)
4. Others (1.37%)

At the time of the 2011 Census of India, 90.56% of the population in the district spoke Odia, 6.61% Urdu, 1.46% Bengali and 0.47% Santali as their first language.

=== Notable people ===
- Laxmikanta Mohapatra (1888–1953), poet, writer, nationalist from Talapada, Tihidi
- Chakradhar Behera (1894–1973), leader of the Peasant Rebellion

== Politics ==
=== Vidhan sabha constituencies ===
The following is the 5 Vidhan sabha constituencies of Bhadrak district and the elected members of that area

No.	Constituency	Reservation	Extent of the Assembly Constituency (Blocks)	Member of 15th Assembly	Party
43	Bhandaripokhari	None	Bhandaripokhari, Bonth	Sanjib Mallick	BJD
44	Bhadrak	None	Bhadrak (M), Bhadrak	Sitansu Sekhar Mohapatra	BJP
45	Basudevpur	None	Basudevpur, Basudevpur, Tihidi (part)	Ashok Kumar Das	INC
46	Dhamnagar	SC	Dhamnagar, Tihidi (part)	Suryabanshi Suraj	BJP
47	Chandabali	None	Chandabali, Tihidi (part)	Byomakesh Ray	BJD

=== Lok Sabha constituency ===
Bhadrak district belongs to Bhadrak constituency. Its member of parliament is Avimanyu Sethi (BJP)
