= Dhamra Port =

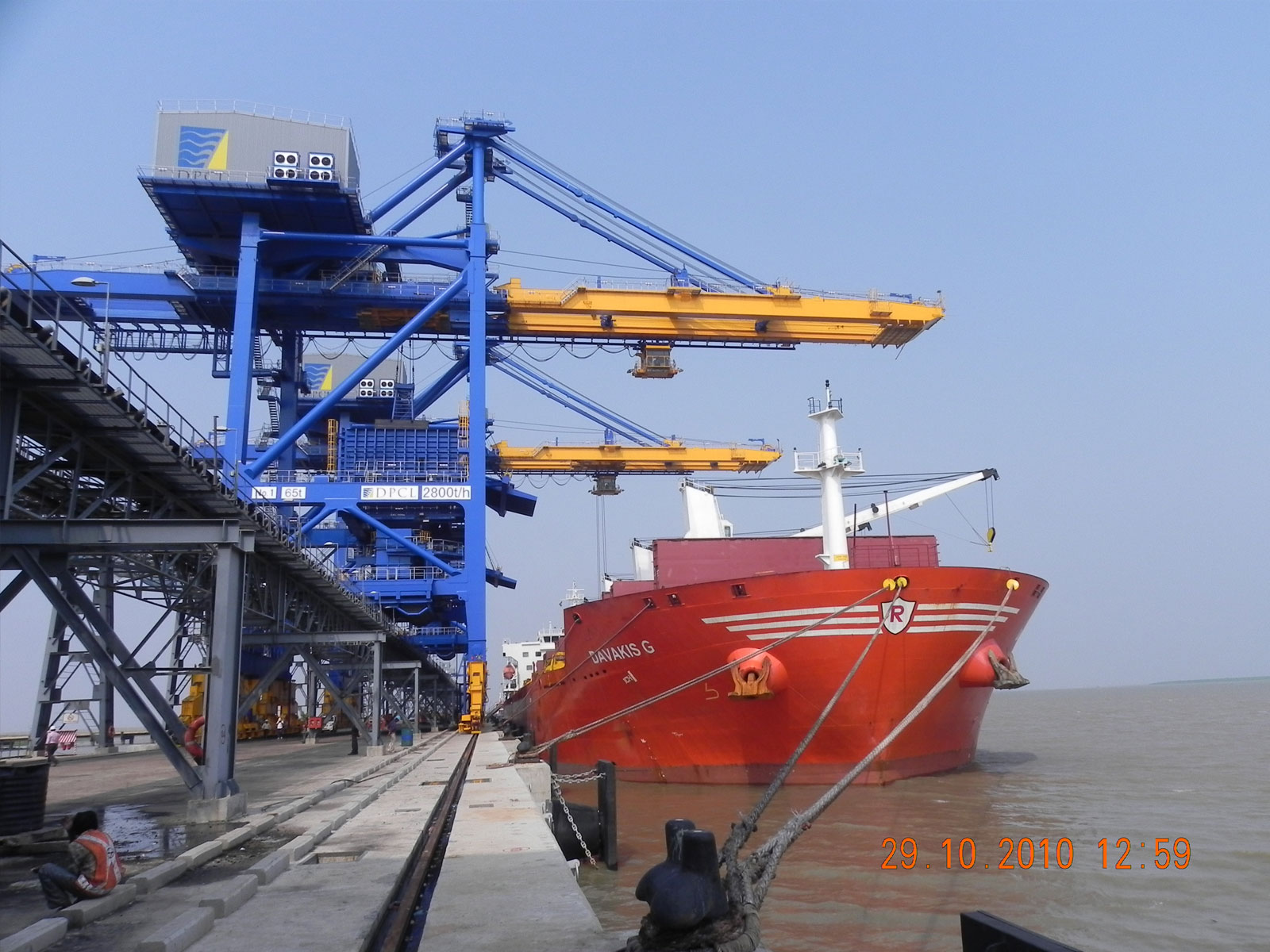
- Interactive map of Dhamra Port

Location
- Country: India
- Location: Dhamra, Bhadrak, Odisha
- Coordinates: 20°49′24″N 86°57′46″E

Details
- Operated by: Dhamra Port Company Limited
- Owned by: Adani Ports & SEZ
- Type of harbour: Coastal natural
- Draft depth: 17.50 metres (57.4 ft)
- Length of approach channel: 18 kilometres (11 mi)

Statistics
- Annual cargo tonnage: 43 million metric tons (47×10^{6} short tons) (2023–24)

The Dhamra Port is a port in Bhadrak district, Odisha, India, on the shore of the Bay of Bengal about seven kilometres from Dhamra town. The agreement to develop the port was signed in April 1998. The Dhamra Port Company Limited (DPCL) was formed as a result of a 50:50 joint venture between Larsen & Toubro and TATA Steel to run the port. The Port received its first vessel on 8 February 2010 and the first commercial vessel on 10 April 2011. The Port has an initial capacity of 25 million tonnes annually, eventually growing to 80 million tonnes annually. Greenpeace has opposed the project, claiming it threatens nearby protected areas and endangered species such as the olive ridley turtle

== Objectives ==
The port was taken over by Adani Port in June 2014. The port will be used to export iron ore from a nearby mineral belt. The Odisha government has plans to develop related industries near the new port, including a shipbuilding yard and a petrochemical and gas-based manufacturing hub. A special investment region has been proposed for Dhamara, and a zoning plan is being prepared to cover housing, health services and other urban infrastructure. A new airport/Airstrip is approved by government of odisha near Dhamra port of around 500 acres. National Waterway 5 project of connecting water channels between Pardeep and Dhamra is also in the construction stage by IWAI. A proposed 4 lane NH is also in DPR stage connecting to Dhamra port from Jamujhadi NH16. A tea processing unit is planned at Dhamra port.

== Construction ==
During the year 1997 Government of Odisha invited M/s International Seaports dredging Private Limited (ISDPL) to explore and evaluate the possibilities of expanding the minor port at Dhamra with modern contemporary facilities. After a site visit and preliminary discussions/evaluation, selected Dhamra port for further expansion. Based on a review of studies undertaken by the Government of Odisha and Indian Institute of Technology (IIT), Chennai, as well as a preliminary field analysis ISDPL proposed a broad project approach. On this basis ISDPL and Government of Odisha entered into a memorandum of understanding on 31.03.97 for the expansion and development of the existing port of Dharma on Built Own Operate Share and Transfer (BOOST) basis. ISDPL signed the concession agreement with the Government of Odisha on 02.04.98. Thereby heralding a new era in the infrastructure development in the port sector of the country with private participation. The proposed Dhamra port is a minor port in the northern part of the state of Orissa situated about 62 km east of Bhadrak station on the Howrah-Chennai East coast mainline. Dhamra port is to be developed as a most modern all-weather, deep-water port, capable of handling all modern shipping efficiently and cost effectively on world standard norms. Development of a suitable road and rail system linking the port with the national network is also considered a vital and integral part of the project. ISDPL proposed that the railway line between Dhamra port and Bhadrak would be built on private siding terms, which is subsequently granted by Railway board. In the meantime, ISDPL had withdrawn its participation from this project due to difficulties in the acquisition of land required for the proposed rail links between Bhadrak and Renital stations and in the change in the composition of the companies investing in the project. This resulted in suspension of activities. In the year 2005, a joint venture company formed in the name of Dhamra Port company limited with 50-50 partnership of Larsen & Toubro Limited and Tata steels limited.

The planned port would have 13 berths with the capacity to handle 83 million tonnes annually. In the first phase, two 350 meter berths have been built to handle import of coking coal, steam coal, thermal coal and limestone, and export of iron ore and steel, with fully mechanized cargo handling. An 18 km navigational channel lets ships with an 18-meter draught use the port. Capacity in the first phase is 15.25 million tonnes of imported coal and limestone and 9.75 million tonnes of exported ore and steel.

A 62 km single-track railway line links the port to Bhadrak/ Ranital, was opened on 8 May 2011. It is the first line of the Indian Government's Railways Infrastructure for Industry Initiative, a revenue sharing model. It is an arrangement between Indian Railways and Dhamara Port.

In September 2010, the port received its first cargo vessel, an Australian ship bringing 45,000 tonnes of coking coal to supply Tata Steel's Jamshedpur plant.

In March 2014, the port received biggest cargo vessel among the ports in India named Macau Mineral carrying 1,94,073 tonnes of coal from the Port of Richards Bay, South Africa. The Dhamra Port became first among the ports in India to berth a parcel size vessel of 2,07,785 DWT (dead weight tonnage).

== Approach channel ==
Depth of water in the channel
Depth		Measure (meters)
Condition	Value	Measure (meters)
Natural depth	Seabed (below CD)	0–18.3 metres (0–60 ft)
Natural depth	Dredged	17 metres (56 ft)
Tidal depth	Maximum (Mean High Water Springs)	20.40 metres (66.9 ft)
Tidal depth	Minimum (Lowest Astronomical Tide)	17.40 metres (57.1 ft)

The port has an approach channel, approximately 18 kilometres (11 mi) long; which was dredged into the open sea to allow ships to navigate the terminal. The approach channel is divided into two parts, known as the Inner and Outer Channels. The Inner Channel has a minimum depth of 17 metres below chart datum and a width of 170 metres, and the Outer Channel has a minimum depth of 17.5 metres below chart datum and a width of 320-220 metres. There is a bend between the Inner and Outer Channels, which has a depth of 17-17.5 metres and a width of 220-244-170 metres.

== Environmental concerns ==
The coast of Odisha is periodically battered by cyclones, which cause tidal surges that may cause devastating floods. In the past, the coast was protected by a 5 km belt of mangroves, but the belt has shrunk due to developments such as dams on the rivers that supply fresh water to the trees. An unusually violent cyclone in 1999 created tidal surges 7 meters high that swept inland, killing 10,000 people and causing property damage that affected several million inhabitant of the coastal strip. There is a concern that the deepwater port will further damage the mangroves, including those at the nearby Bhitarkanika Mangroves conservation area. In May 2010 a non-partisan group of 20 politicians began lobbying to halt construction, which they claimed was in violation of the Forest Conservation Act of 1980.

The planned port is located just north of the Gahirmatha Marine Sanctuary, where from 200,000 to 500,000 female olive ridley turtles nest every year. Although the port site is not a nesting area, environmentalists are concerned that dredging and industrial pollution will disrupt the environment and the natural food chain. In July 2007, Greenpeace activists staged a rally in front of Bombay House, headquarters of the TATA Group, demanding a halt to construction of the port which they claimed would harm the turtles. The DPCL has rejected concerns about the impact. They state that all environmental clearances were obtained correctly, that the main breeding grounds for the turtles are well to the south, and that the shipping lanes will not cut across turtle migration routes. TATA & Sons filed a suit against Greenpeace in the Delhi High Court, claiming a "Turtle vs TATA" game on their website constituted defamation and trademark infringement.

The Cyclone Yaas made a landfall in Balasore, Odisha near the port, which resulted in severe destruction. Cyclone Dana too made landfall near this port on October 24-25, 2024.
