= Talacher =

- Town
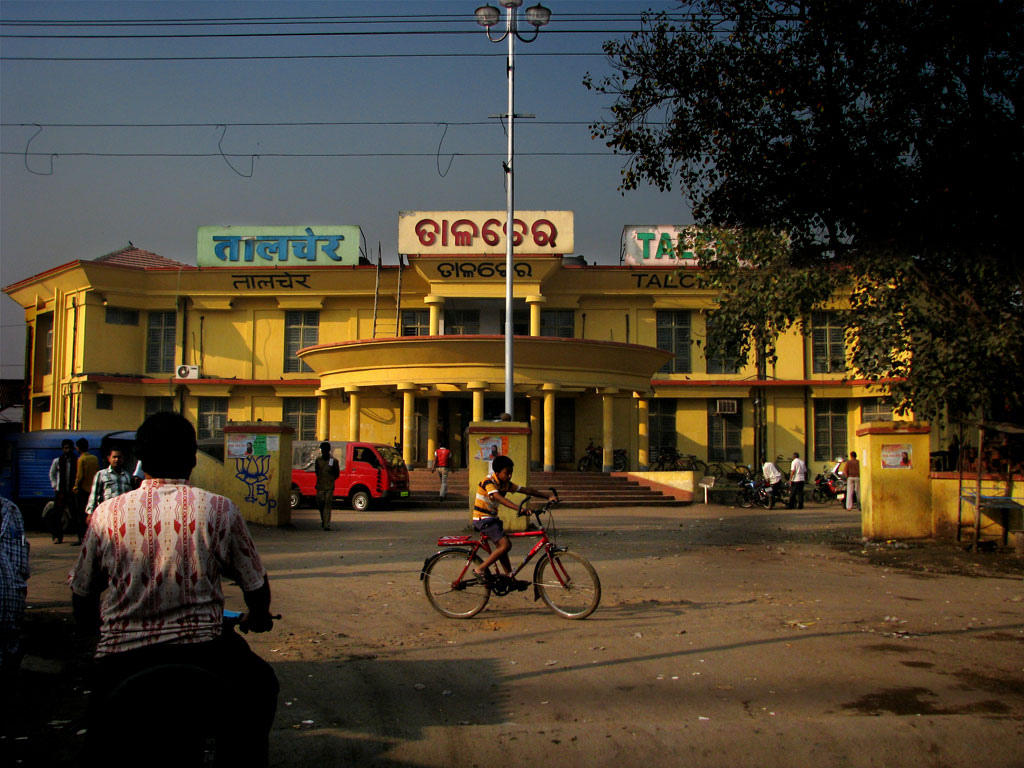
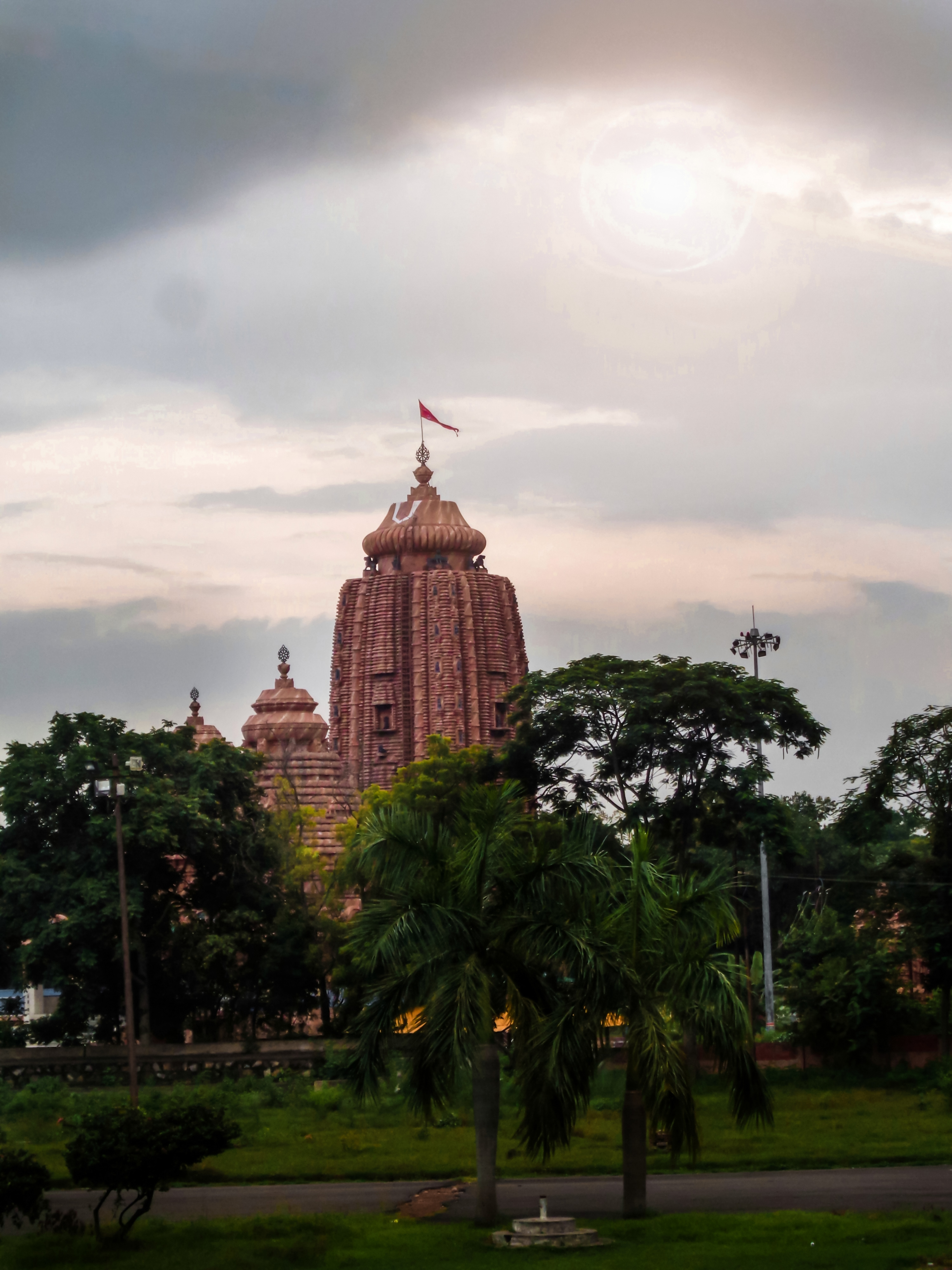
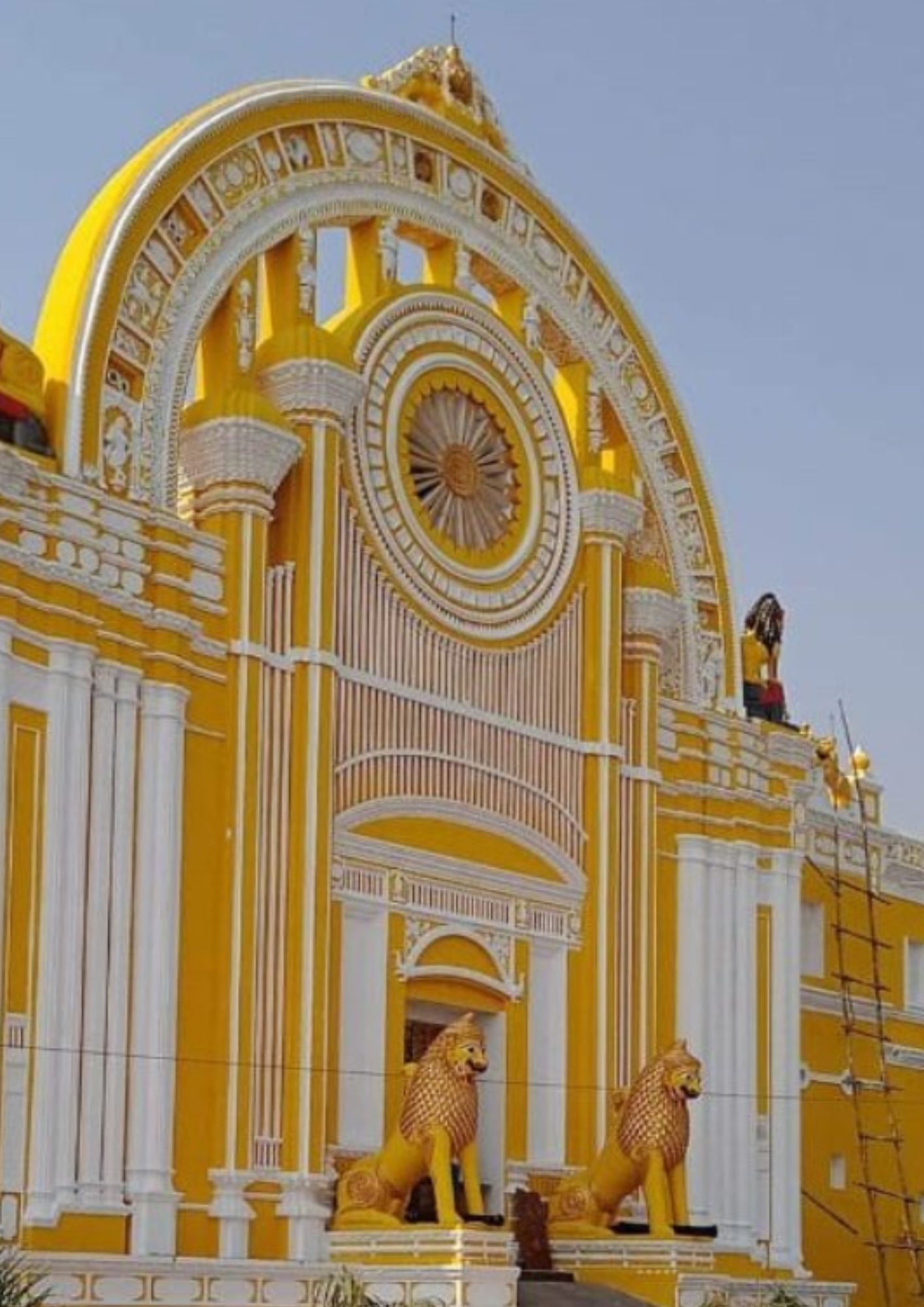
- From top; left to right: Talacher Railway Station , Jagannath Mandir, Talacher King Palace
- Nickname: City of Black Diamond
- Location in Odisha Talacher (India)
- Coordinates: 20.95°N 85.23°E
- Country: India
- State: Odisha
- District: Angul
- Established: 1951

Government
  - Body: Municipality
  - Sub-Collector/Sub-Divisional Magistrate: Shri Samir Kumar Jena, IAS
  - Members of Legislative Assembly: Braja Kishore Pradhan BJD

Population (2011)
  - Total: 40,841
- Demonym: Talcheria

Languages
  - Official: Odia, English
- Time zone: UTC+5:30 (IST)
- PIN: 759100, 759103, 759107, 759116
- Telephone code: 06760
- Vehicle registration: OD-35
- Nearest city: Dhenkanal, Cuttack, Bhubaneswar, Angul
- Literacy: 75%
- Lok Sabha constituency: Dhenkanal

Talacher, famously known as the City Of Black Diamond, is a major industrial coal town and municipality in Odisha. Talacher is one of the four sub-divisions of Angul district in the Indian state of Odisha.

== History ==
During the British Raj Talacher was the capital of Talcher State, one of the princely states of the Eastern States Agency. The region surrounding Talacher has been inhabited since pre-historic times, as archaeological evidence suggests. During ancient times, Talacher and its surrounding areas were part of the Kalinga. The city has witnessed the rise and fall of various dynasties and empires over the centuries.

In medieval times, It was ruled by the Bhanja dynasty, a local ruling family, during the 13th and 14th centuries. Later, the region was dominated by the Gajapati dynasty.

=== Rulers of Talcher ===
- Narahari Singh (1471 - 1480 CE)
- Udayanarayana Singh (1480 - 1520)
- Govind Charan Singh (1520 - 1527)
- Padmanabha Birabara Harichandan (1575 - 1598)
- Chakradhar Birabara Harichandan (1598 - 1651)
- Gopinath Birabara Harichandan (1651 - 1711)
- Ramchandra Birabara Harichandan (1711 - 1729)
- Pitambar Birabara Harichandan (1729 - 1740)
- Lal Singh (1740 - 1752)
- Krishna Chandra Birabara Harichandan (1752 - 1766)
- Ramchandra (Ayadi) Birabara Harichandan (1766 - 1774)
- Nimai Charan Champati Birabara Harichandan (1774 - 1778)
- Bhagirathi Birabara Harichandan (1778 - 1846)
- Dayanidhi Birabara Harichandan Mahapatra (1846 - 1873)
- Ramchandra Deba Birabara Harichandan Mahapatra (1873 - 18 Dec 1891)
- Kishor Chandra Deba Birabara Harichandan Mahapatra (18 Dec 1891 - 7 Nov 1945)
- Hrudaya Chandra Deba Birabara
- Harichandan Mahapatra (7 Nov 1945 – 1 January 1948)

Coal mining activities gained momentum during the colonial era, and the Talacher Coalfields became a vital source of coal for British industries. After India gained independence in 1947, the coal mines in Talacher came under the control of the Indian government. The development of the coal mining industry led to the growth of Talacher as an industrial center. Power generation, steel manufacturing, and other associated industries also flourished in the region. Over the years, Talacher has undergone significant development and urbanization. It has witnessed the establishment of modern infrastructure, including educational institutions, hospitals, and transportation networks, to cater to the growing population and industrial needs.

== Demographics ==
As of the 2011 India census, Talcher had a population of 40,841. Males constitute 55% of the population and females 45%. Talcher has an average literacy rate of 75%, higher than the national average of 59.5%: male literacy is 80%, and female literacy is 62%. In Talcher, 12% of the population is under 6 years of age.

== Climate ==
Talacher has been ranked 4th Best National Clean Air City under (Category 3 population under 3 lakhs cities) in India.

== Transport ==
=== Railways ===
Talcher railway station is a railway station on the East Coast Railway network in the state of Odisha, India. It serves Talacher. Its code is TLHR. It has two platforms. Passenger, MEMU, Express and Superfast trains halt at Talcher railway station.

== Economy ==
Talcher city is home to several notable companies and organizations that contribute to its economy and industrial growth. Companies like National Thermal Power Corporation, Mahanadi Coalfields Limited, National Aluminium Company Limited, Talcher Fertilizers Limited, Odisha Mining Corporation operate from here. The city's industrial landscape encompasses various sectors, including coal mining, power generation, aluminum smelting, steel manufacturing, and fertilizer making.

- Talcher Coalfield is located in the valley of the Brahmani.

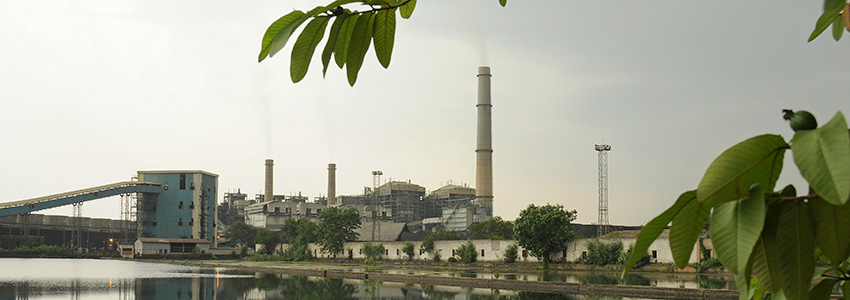
Talcher Thermal Power Station

- Talcher Super Thermal Power Station - is a prominent thermal power plant located in Odisha. It is operated by the NTPC, which is a government-owned power utility company in India. The Talcher Thermal Power Station plays a crucial role in meeting the energy demands of the state and the country. The power station has a total installed capacity of 4600 megawatts (MW) and consists of multiple units equipped with advanced supercritical and subcritical technologies.
- Heavy Water Board (HWB) facilities in Talacher involved in several activities related to the production of special chemicals and isotopes for nuclear fuel. The facility produces organophosphorus solvents like D2EHPA (Di-2-ethylhexyl phosphoric acid), TOPO (Tri-n-octylphosphine oxide), TAPO (Tri-n-amylphosphine oxide), and DNPPA (Di-n-butylphenyl phosphoric acid). These chemicals are produced for in-house consumption, likely for use in nuclear fuel cycle processes. Enrichment of Boron Isotopes: HWB Talacher is involved in the enrichment of boron isotopes, specifically Boron-10 and Boron-11.

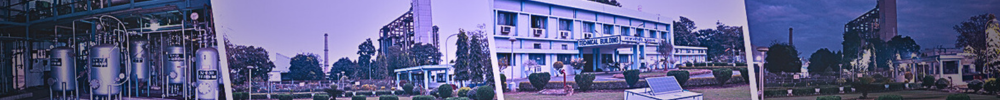
TALACHER DEUTERIUM PLANT

- Garage industry in Talacher - The garages in Talcher provide the necessary logistics support, maintaining a fleet of trucks, trailers, and vehicles to transport the coal efficiently and reliably.
- Talcher Fertilizer Project - The project involves the construction of a coal-based ammonia-urea fertilizer complex with annual production capacity of 1.27 million metric tons of urea in Talacher. It will consist of a coal gasification-based ammonia plant and a urea plant.
