= Edulavalasa =

Coordinates: 18°23′13″N 84°02′57″E

Edulavalasa is a village in Polaki Mandal in Srikakulam District in the Indian State of Andhra Pradesh. (Srikakulam District is one of the 52 backward districts in India).

== Geography ==
Edulavalasa is 50 meters (164.042 feet) above the sea level.

== Demography ==
The local language of Edulavalasa is Telugu. Total population of Edulavalasa is 2650 in which 1275 are males and 1375 are females living in 551 houses. The total area of Edulavalasa is 550 hectares.
