= Srikakulam mandal =

- Mandal
- Interactive Map Outlining Srikakulam mandal
- Location in Andhra Pradesh, India
- Country: India
- State: Andhra Pradesh
- District: Srikakulam
- Headquarters: Srikakulam

Government
  - Tehsildar: Ch.Sattibabu

Population (2011)
  - Total: 94,393

Languages
  - Official: Telugu
- Time zone: UTC+5:30 (IST)

Srikakulam mandal is one of the 38 mandals in Srikakulam district of the Indian state of Andhra Pradesh. It is under the administration of Srikakulam revenue division and the headquarters are located at Srikakulam. The mandal is bounded Amudalavalasa, Etcherla and Gara mandals. A portion of it lies on the banks of Vamsadhara River and Bay of Bengal.

== Administration ==
The mandal is administered by a Tahsildar and the present tahsildar is Ch.Sattibabu.

Towns and villages

As of 2011 census, the mandal has 28 settlements. It includes 2 town, 1 out growth and 25 villages.

The settlements in the mandal are listed below:

1. Alikam
2. Arasavilli (R) (OG)
3. Balaga (CT)
4. Balivada
5. Batteru
6. Byri
7. Byrivanipeta
8. Gudem
9. Ippili
10. Kallepalle
11. Karajada
12. Lankam
13. Lingalavalasa
14. Mofusbandar
15. Naira
16. Pathasrikakulam (R) (Part)
17. Patrunivalasa(Part)
18. Peddapadu
19. Ponnam
20. Ragolu
21. Ragolupeta
22. Sanivada
23. Silagamsingivalasa
24. Singupuram
25. Srikakulam (M) †
26. Thandemvalasa
27. Vakalavalasa
28. Voppangi

Note: †-Mandal headquarter, CT–Census town, M–Municipality

== See also ==
- List of mandals in Andhra Pradesh
