= Vajrapu Kotturu =

Coordinates: 18°42′10″N 84°25′57″E

- Village
- Interactive map of Vajrapu Kotturu
- Country: India
- State: Andhra Pradesh
- District: Srikakulam
- Talukas: Vajrapu Kotturu

Languages
  - Official: Telugu
- Time zone: UTC+5:30 (IST)
- PIN: 532217
- Vehicle Registration: AP30 (Former); AP39 (from 30 January 2019)
- Lok Sabha constituency: Srikakulam
- Vidhan Sabha constituency: Palasa

Vajrapu-kotturu is a village in Srikakulam district of the Indian state of Andhra Pradesh. Vajrapukotturu mandal is bordered by Mandasa, Palasa, Nandigam and Santha Bommali mandals of Srikakulam district and has a long coastline off Bay of Bengal. Bendi Gedda river joins the sea after forming a lagoon in this mandal area.

== Demographics ==
As of 2001 Indian census, the demographic details of Vajrapu Kotturu mandal is as follows:

- Total Population: 69,398 in 16,224 Households
- Male Population: 33,380 and Female Population: 36,018
- Children Under 6-years of age: 9,077 (Boys - 4,573 and Girls 4,504)
- Total Literates: 36,627
