= Kothuru =

Kothuru may refer to:

- Kothuru, Krishna, a village in Andhra Pradesh, India
- Kothuru, Srikakulam, a town in Andhra Pradesh, India
- Kothuru, West Godavari district, a village in Andhra Pradesh, India
- Kotturu Tadepalli, a village in NTR district, Andhra Pradesh, India
- Kothuru Assembly constituency, Andhra Pradesh Legislative Assembly, India

== See also ==
- Kotturu (disambiguation)
