= Kotturu =

Kotturu may refer to:

- Kotturu, Karnataka, a town in Vijayanagara district, Karnataka, India
- Kotturu, Srikakulam, a village in Srikakulam district, Andhra Pradesh, India
- Kotturu Dhanadibbalu, a buddhist monument in Andhra Pradesh, India
- Kotturu Tadepalli, a village in NTR district, Andhra Pradesh, India

== See also ==
- Kothuru (disambiguation)
- Kottur (disambiguation)
