= Aurobindo Pharma =

Indian multinational pharmaceutical company private limited

Aurobindo Pharma Limited
- Type: Public
- Traded as: NSE: AUROPHARMA; BSE: 524804
- Industry: Pharmaceuticals
- Founded: 1986; 40 years ago
- Founders: V. Ramprasad Reddy; K. Nityananda Reddy
- Headquarters: Hyderabad, Telangana, India
- Products: Pharmaceuticals; generic drugs; over-the-counter drugs; vaccines; diagnostics; contact lenses; animal health
- Revenue: ▲₹31,724 crore (US$3.3 billion) (2025)
- Operating income: ▲₹6,605 crore (US$690 million) (2025)
- Net income: ▲₹3,484 crore (US$360 million) (2025)
- Total assets: ▲₹49,748 crore (US$5.2 billion) (2025)
- Total equity: ▲₹32,646 crore (US$3.4 billion) (2025)
- Number of employees: 23,000 (2020)
- Subsidiaries: Lannett Company
- Website: www.aurobindo.com
- Footnotes; Financials as of 31 March 2025.

Aurobindo Pharma Limited is an Indian multinational pharmaceutical manufacturing company based in HITEC City, Hyderabad, with U.S. headquarters in East Windsor, Mercer County, New Jersey. The company manufactures generic pharmaceuticals and active pharmaceutical ingredients. The company's area of activity includes six major therapeutic and product areas: antibiotics, anti-retrovirals, cardiovascular products, central nervous system products, gastroenterologicals, and anti-allergics. The company markets these products in over 125 countries. Its marketing partners include Pfizer and AstraZeneca.

== History ==
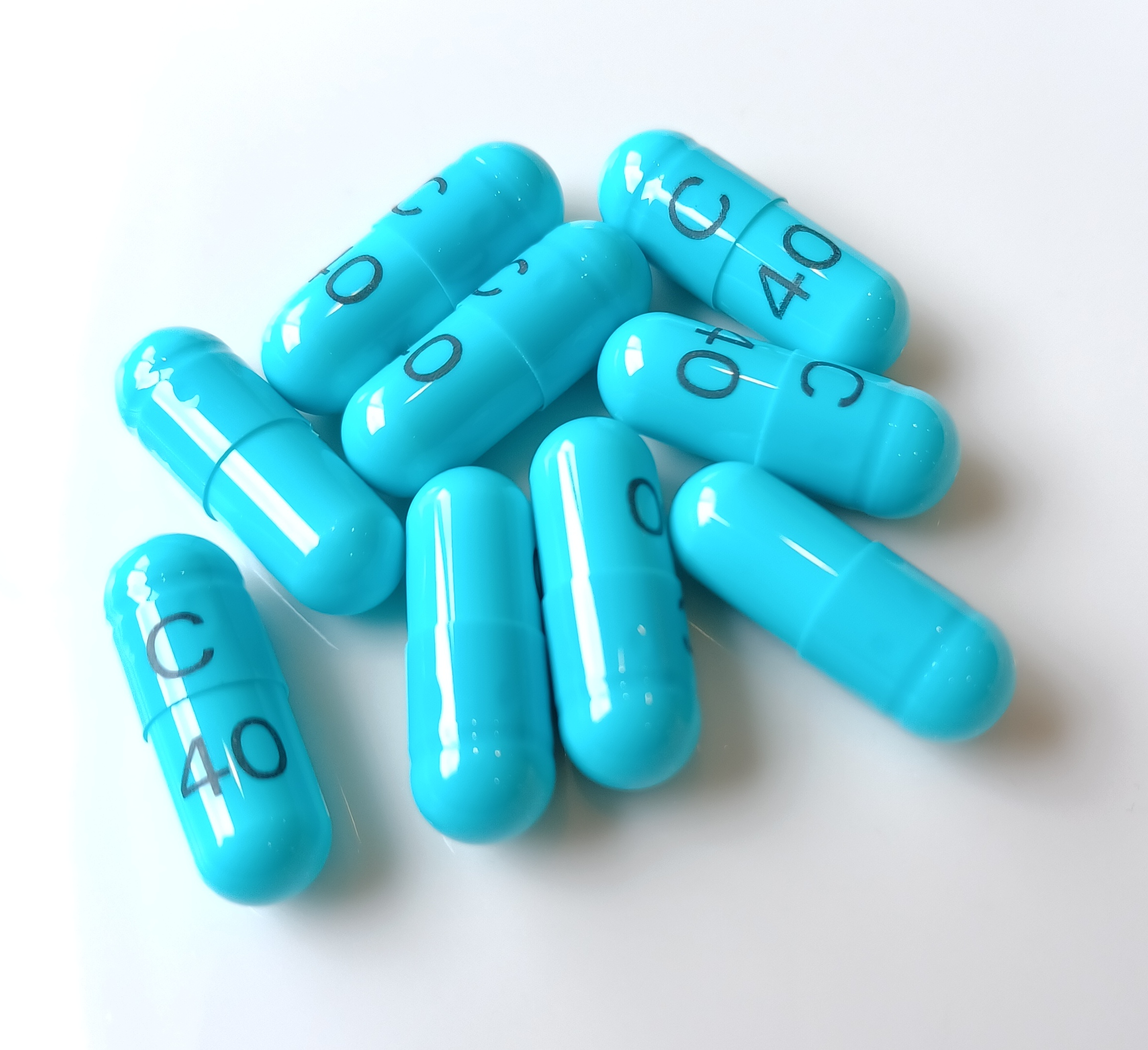
Aurobindo Pharma clindamycin capsules

The company commenced operations in 1988–89 with a single unit manufacturing semi-synthetic penicillin (SSP) in Puducherry. Aurobindo Pharma became a public company in 1992 and listed its shares on the Indian stock exchanges in 1995. Aurobindo Pharma also has a presence in key therapeutic segments such as neurosciences, cardiovascular, anti-retrovirals, anti-diabetics, gastroenterologicals, and cephalosporins, among others.

Aurobindo Pharma features among the top 10 companies in India in terms of consolidated revenues. Aurobindo exports to over 125 countries with more than 70% of its revenues derived out of international operations, primarily from the U.S.

In 2014, Aurobindo purchased the generic operations of Actavis in seven Western European countries for US$41 million.

=== Business expansion ===
Aurobindo Pharma plans to expand its product portfolio with high-value products in oncology, hormones, biosimilars, and novel drug delivery solutions like depot injections, inhalers, patches, and films. It has also set its sights on geographic expansion in new territories like Poland, Italy, Spain, Czech Republic, Portugal, and France, as the generic drug market in these countries is relatively small.

In 2017, Aurobindo Pharma inked a pact to acquire Portugal's Generis Farmaceutica SA from Magnum Capital Partners for a consideration of €135 million. It also acquired four biosimilar products from Swiss firm TL Biopharmaceutical AG.

Aurobindo Pharma Ltd. signed a definitive agreement to purchase the Apotex businesses in Poland, the Czech Republic, the Netherlands, Spain and Belgium. The agreement is conditional on the receipt of competition clearances for the transaction by the Dutch and Polish authorities. As part of the proposed sale, Apotex will enter into a transitional manufacturing and supply arrangement with Aurobindo to support the ongoing growth plans of these businesses.

In May 2024, TheraNym Biologics, a wholly owned subsidiary of Aurobindo Pharma Ltd signed a pact with Merck & Co. for expanding its biologics manufacturing facilities and exploring contract manufacturing operations for biologics.

In 2026, Aurobindo Pharma, through its wholly owned subsidiary Aurobindo Pharma USA Inc., acquired Lannett Company for $250 million, expanding its presence in the US generic pharmaceuticals market.

== Legal issues ==
In December 2016, 20 American attorneys general filed a civil complaint accusing Aurobindo Pharma of a coordinated scheme to artificially maintain high prices for a generic antibiotic and diabetes drug. The complaint alleged price collusion schemes between six pharmaceutical firms including informal gatherings, telephone calls, and text messages.

On 11 April 2018, Aurobindo was featured in the Dutch documentary television program Zembla. It details accusations against the company of both environmental damage and poor working conditions for their employees in Hyderabad, India.

On 20 June 2019, Aurobindo received a warning letter from the USFDA after an inspection of its drug manufacturing facility, Aurobindo Pharma Limited in Pydibhimavaram, Srikakulam District, Andhra Pradesh. The warning letter summarized significant deviations from current good manufacturing practices (cGMP) for active pharmaceutical ingredients (API).

On 7 October 2019, Aurobindo said it received seven observations from the USFDA for its unit-7 formulation plant in Telangana, with regard to potentially misleading documentation. This caused its share prices to drop over 20%.

== Recalls ==
In 2018, and 2019, Aurobindo Pharma USA recalled tablets containing valsartan due to the detection of N-Nitrosodiethylamine (NDEA) which is a probable human carcinogen.

In November 2019, Aurobindo Pharma USA recalled ranitidine tablets, capsules, and syrup due to the detection of unacceptable levels of N-nitrosodimethylamine (NDMA).

== See also ==
- Biotech and pharmaceutical companies in the New York metropolitan area
