= Vamsadhara River =

River in India

Vamsadhara వంశధార నది ବଂଶଧାରା ନଦୀ
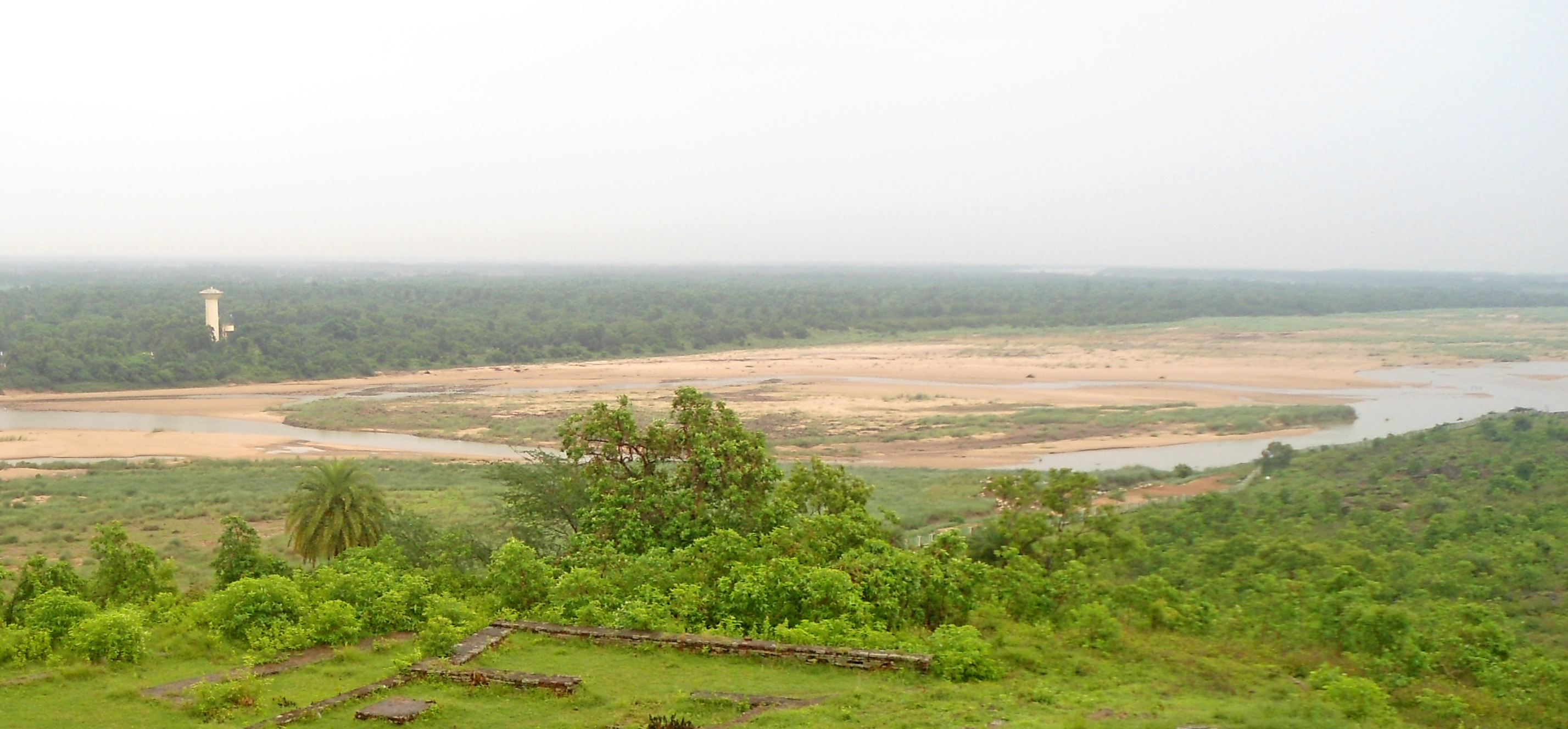
- Vamsadhara River as seen from Salihundam in Srikakulam district
- Course of Vamsadhara

Location
- Country: India

Physical characteristics
- Source: Thuamul Rampur
  - location: Kalahandi
- Discharge
  - location: Bay of Bengal
  - average: 103 m^{3}/s (3,600 cu ft/s)

River Vamsadhara or River Banshadhara is an east-flowing river between Rushikulya and Godavari, in Odisha and Andhra Pradesh states in India.

The river originates near Lanjigarh in the Kalahandi district of Odisha at an elevation of 400 meters and runs for a distance of about 278 kilometers, and joins the Bay of Bengal at Kalingapatnam, Andhra Pradesh. The total catchment area of the river basin is about 10,830 square kilometers. The average water yield in the river basin at Gotta barrage is 144 TMC in a year and the 75% dependable yield is 105 TMC as assessed by the CWC.

Tourist attractions of Hiramandalam Mukhalingam and Kalingapatnam in Srikakulam district are located on the banks of this river.

Mahendratanaya River is a major tributary of the Vamsadhara originating in Gajapati district of Odisha and joins Vamsadhara in Andhra Pradesh upstream of Gotta barrage. Regulapadu reservoir in Andhra Pradesh is under construction to store the Mahendratanaya river water for irrigation use.

== Interstate aspects ==
to meet uninterrupted renewable and green power needsVamsadhara river basin occupies 8015 square kilometers in Odisha and the remaining 2815 km^{2} flows in Andhra Pradesh. The river basin receives an average annual rainfall of 1400 mm. The portion lying in Rayagada district of Odisha is a predominantly hilly and tribal populated area. Andhra Pradesh and Odisha roughly estimated that 115 thousand million cubic feet (TMC) of water is available for use in the river. They entered into agreements to use the available river water in 50:50 ratio. Andhra Pradesh has taken up Gotta barrage and Neradi barrage projects to put its share of water for use. Odisha has not taken up new projects in the basin area to utilize its share of water. It is diverting Vamsadhara river waters to adjacent Rushikulya river basin by constructing Harabhangi dam without taking prior consent from Andhra Pradesh. Also, Orissa has raised objections to Neradi barrage project on the grounds of land submergence in its territory during unprecedented floods.

Approximately 25% of the available water in this basin is being utilized during the monsoon season by constructing barrages across the river. Reservoirs up to 100 TMC water storage capacity are to be constructed for the non-monsoon period irrigation requirements, which would allow 100% water utilization. Most of the land to be irrigated is located in Andhra Pradesh, while the possible storage reservoirs are located in Odisha. Vamsadhara River water disputes tribunal was constituted under Interstate River Water Disputes Act to resolve river water sharing issues between the two states. Justice Mukundakam Sharma is the chairman of Vamsadhara Water Dispute Tribunal. The tribunal pronounced its draft verdict in September 2017 and permitted AP state to construct the side weir at Katragedda and Neradi barrage. The tribunal also upheld the sharing of 115 TMC total yield at Gotta barrage between AP and Odisha in 50:50 ratio as per the agreement reached between the states on 30 September 1962.

In the year 2021, the Vamsadhara water disputes tribunal released its final report without much change from the draft report except sharing of available water in the river basin on yearly basis at 50:50 by both states.

== Unutilized water ==
Nearly 82.86 TMC of water has flowed unutilized into the sea on average in a water year from 1 June 2006 to 31 May 2022 (16 years). The yearly water unutilized is given below

Unutilized water
Water year	06-07	07-08	08-09	09-10	10-11	11-12	12-13	13-14	14-15	15-16	16-17	17-18	18-19	19-20	20-21	21-22
Unutilized water (TMC)	200.6	129	88.4	66.9	81.6	41.3	55.7	127.2	156.1	25.21	36.61	87	109.7	40.1	57.2	23.2

== The Vamsadhara Project ==
Boddepalli Rajagopala Rao Vamsadhara Project was constructed on Vamsadhara river.

Vamsadhara is the main river of North Eastern Andhra. The North Eastern Andhra region consists of three North Eastern Coastal districts in Andhra Pradesh state in India. Vamsadhara project is designed to meet the irrigation needs of North Eastern Coastal Andhra.

The Vamsadhara project from Gotta barrage has two canals viz., the left main canal (LMC), irrigating about 148,000 acres (600 km^{2}), and the right main canal (RMC) covering an ayacut of 62,280 acres (252 km^{2}). The LMC was completed earlier. The RMC was delayed but later completed. Gotta Reservoir feeds the right main canal. About 166 villages in seven mandals viz., L.N. Peta, Hiramandalam, Burja, Amadalavalasa, Gara, Sarubujjili and Srikakulam will benefit from the RMC.

== Lower Vamsadhara Project ==
The Lower Vamsadhara project envisages construction of 58m high & 1700m long dam across the vamsadhara river near Minajhola village (near 19°31′00″N 83°44′30″E ) in Rayagada district creating hydraulic head of nearly 62 meters. This project would be a multipurpose project serving power generation, irrigation and flood control.

== Hiramandalam reservoir ==
Hiramandalam reservoir of 19 TMC storage capacity with 67 m MSL full reservoir level is already completed but the water supply from the Vamsadhara River is yet to be made by constructing a side weir on the river. The reservoir is connected by a flood flow canal from the Vamsadhara River via a side weir. The flood flow canal would also irrigate 20,000 acres. Since the maximum permitted yearly water diversion from the side weir/Neradi barrage is 8 TMC which is not adequate for water needs, additionally Andhra Pradesh state is planning to pump water (nearly 20 meters lift with concrete volute pumps) into the Hiramanadalam reservoir from the nearby Gotta barrage pond. In future, Heeramandalam and Gotta reservoirs could be used as the lower reservoirs of a 10,000 MW capacity pumped-storage hydroelectric plant to meet the renewable power needs of Uttara Andhra region.

== Vamsadhara and Nagavali link canal ==
A 30 km long gravity canal is planned to link the Vamsadhara and Nagavali Rivers. It will run from Hiramandalam reservoir to Narayanapuram barrage near Amudalavalasa and bring an additional 50,000 acres of ayacut under irrigation using 10 TMC of water from Vamsadhara basin.

== Future projects ==
Once Neradi barrage is constructed in the upstream of Gotta Barrage, left bank canal or Vamsadhara to Mahendratanaya link canal from the Neradi barrage pond would be connected up to the Mahendratanaya River in Odisha. This canal, fully located in Odisha state, would augment water supply to Mahendratanaya Off Shore reservoir project (under construction) in Andhra Pradesh as well as water supply to irrigate lands in Odisha state.

== See also ==
- Nagavali River
- Sileru River
- Krishna Water Disputes Tribunal
- Jalaput Dam
- Polavaram Project
- Sriram Sagar Project
- Nizam Sagar
- Balimela Reservoir
- Penner River
- Palar River
