= Srikakulam revenue division =

- revenue division in Srikakulam district
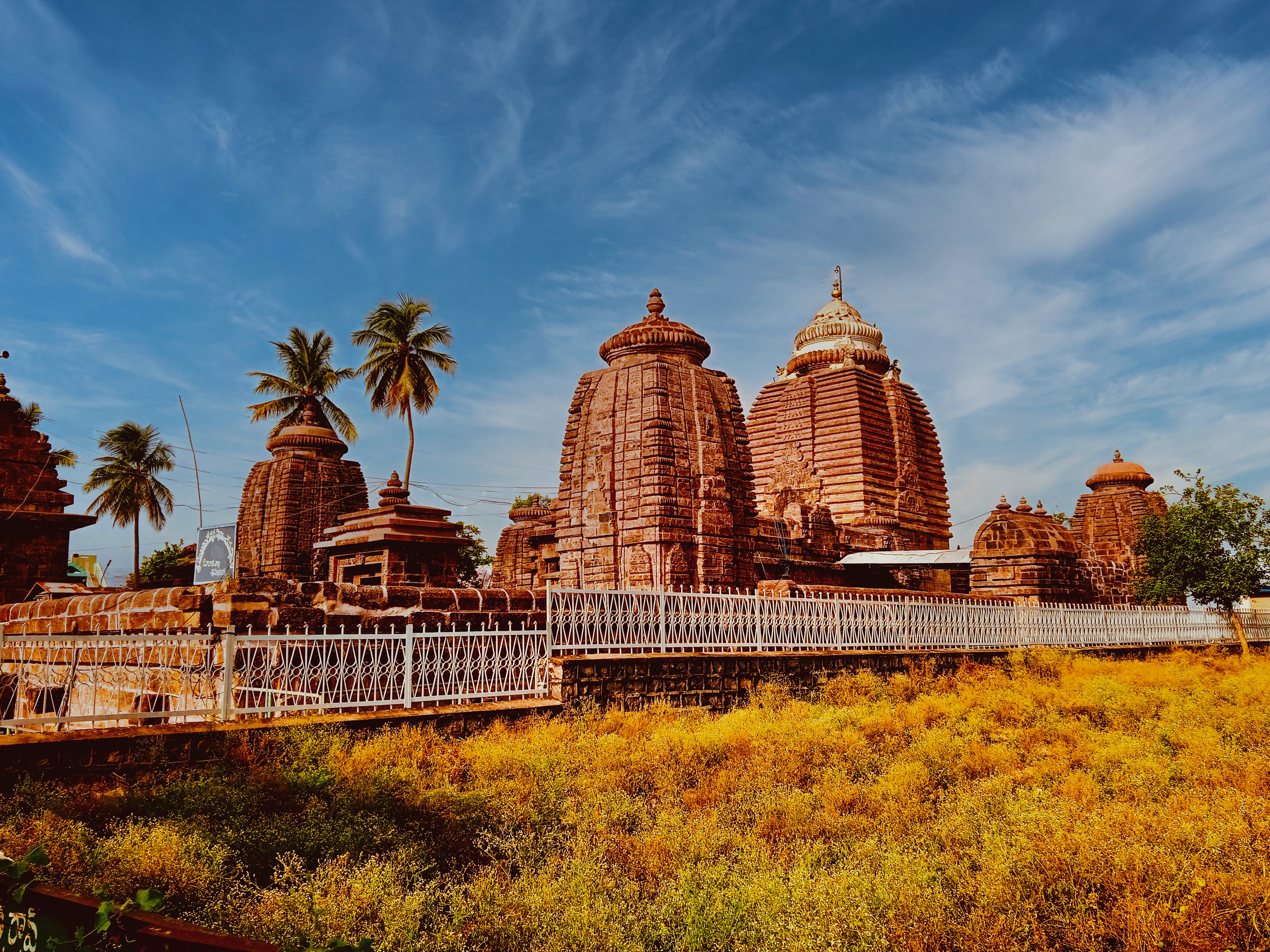
- Mukhalingeswara temple, Mukhalingam

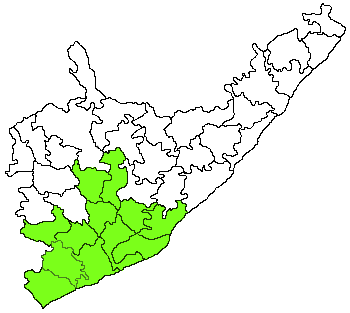
- Srikakulam revenue division in Srikakulam district
- Country: India
- State: Andhra Pradesh
- District: Srikakulam

Population (2011)
  - Total: 1,005,427

Demographics
  - Languages: Telugu

Srikakulam revenue division (or Srikakulam division) is a revenue division in the Srikakulam district of the Indian state of Andhra Pradesh. It is one of the three revenue divisions in the district with thirteen mandals under its administration. The divisional headquarters are located at Srikakulam.

== Administration ==
The 13 mandals administered under the revenue division are:

No.	Mandals
1	Srikakulam mandal
2	Gara mandal
3	Amadalavalsa mandal
4	Ponduru mandal
5	Sarubujji mandal
6	Burja mandal
7	Narasannapeta mandal
8	Polaki mandal
9	Etcherla mandal
10	Laveru mandal
11	Ranastalam mandal
12	Ganguvarisigadam mandal
13	Jalumuru mandal

== Demographics ==
The division has a population of 10,05,427. Rural population was 7,79,693 and urban population was 2,25,734. Scheduled Castes and Scheduled Tribes make up 9.13% and 0.73% of the population respectively.

98.65% of the population are Hindus. 98.93% of the population spoke Telugu as their first language.

== See also ==
- List of revenue divisions in Andhra Pradesh
- List of mandals in Andhra Pradesh
