= Veeragunnamapuram =

- Village
- Interactive map of Veeragunnamapuram
- Location in Andhra Pradesh, India Veeragunnamapuram (India)
- Coordinates: 18.888024°N 84.501701°E
- Country: India
- State: Andhra Pradesh
- District: Srikakulam

Government
  - Type: Gram Panchayat

Population
  - Total: 1,022

Languages
  - Official: Telugu
- Time zone: UTC+5:30 (IST)
- PIN: 532243
- Vehicle registration: AP-30

Veeragunnamapuram also called Rajapuram is a village in Srikakulam district of the Indian state of Andhra Pradesh. It is located in Mandasa mandal.

== Etymology ==
The name Veeragunnamapuram is derived from Veera Gunamma, a famous freedom fighter from this village, also known for donating her property to farmers.

== Demographics ==
Veeragunnamapuram village has a population of 1022 of which 570 are males while 452 are females as per the 2011 Population Census.
