= Thota =

Thota (Telugu: తోట) is a Telugu surname. Notable people with this surname include:

- Thota Gopala Krishna (1945–2012), Indian politician, Lok Sabha member from Andhra Pradesh
- Thota Narasayya Naidu, Indian wrestler and freedom fighter of the 1930s
- Thota Narasimham, Indian politician
- Thota Seetharama Lakshmi, Indian politician, Rajya Sabha member from Andhra Pradesh
- Thota Tharani, Indian film art director and production designer
- Thota Vaikuntam, Indian painter
- Raj Thota, Indian Telugu-language film-maker

== See also ==
- Thotapalli or Thota Palli, a village in Vizianagaram district, Andhra Pradesh
