= Rompivalasa =

- Village
- Interactive map of Rompivalasa
- Location within Andhra Pradesh Location within India
- Coordinates: 18°44′33″N 84°02′45″E
- Country: India
- State: Andhra Pradesh
- District: Srikakulam

Population (2011)
  - Total: 1,795

Languages
  - Official: Telugu
- Time zone: UTC+5:30 (IST)
- PIN: 532214

Rompivalasa is a village in Srikakulam district of the Indian state of Andhra Pradesh. It is located in Pathapatnam mandal.

== Etymology ==
It is said that the place was once affected by the floods of the Mahendra Tanaya river, so the nearby villagers named it rompi valasa, which literally means "mud village".

== Demographics ==
As of 2011 census, Rompivalasa had a population of 1,795. The total population constitute, 907 males and 888 females —a sex ratio of 979 females per 1000 males. 168 children are in the age group of 0–6 years. The average literacy rate stands at 58.02% with 944 literates, significantly lower than the district average of 61.70%.

== Education ==
The village's ZPH School is the main source of education. The new premises was establised on 6th of July 1991. The school land was donated by late Tulagapu Ramakrishna, Kottapalli Gangayya Achari and others.
