= Mogadalapadu =

- hamlet
- Interactive map of Mogadalapadu
- Location in Andhra Pradesh, India
- Country: India
- State: Andhra Pradesh
- District: Srikakulam

Languages
  - Official: Telugu
- Time zone: UTC+5:30 (IST)
- Vehicle registration: AP-

Mogadalapadu is a hamlet in Vatchavalasa panchayat of Gara mandal in Srikakulam district, Andhra Pradesh India. There is a beach near the village popular with tourists.
