= Dr. B. R. Ambedkar University, Srikakulam =

Public university in Andhra Pradesh, India

- Motto: Education For Everyone
- Type: Public
- Established: 2008
- Affiliations: UGC
- Chancellor: Governor of Andhra Pradesh
- Vice-Chancellor: K. Remi Rajani
- Location: Etcherla, Andhra Pradesh, India
- Website: www.brau.edu.in

Dr. B. R. Ambedkar University, Srikakulam is a state university located in Etcherla, Srikakulam district, Andhra Pradesh, India. It was established in 2008 by the Government of Andhra Pradesh. The university is named after B. R. Ambedkar.

== History ==
The Dr. B.R. Ambedkar University, Srikakulam was established by the Government of Andhra Pradesh in 2008. The university was given control of the Andhra University campus in Etcherla and all its affiliated colleges in Srikakulam. The first Vice-Chancellor (VC) was S.V. Sudhakar, followed by H. Lajipathi Rai in 2013. Nimma Venkata Rao was appointed VC in January 2021.
