= Pothrakonda =

- Village
- Interactive map of Pothrakonda
- Location in Andhra Pradesh, India Pothrakonda (India)
- Coordinates: 18.906346°N 84.537202°E
- Country: India
- State: Andhra Pradesh
- District: Srikakulam

Government
  - Type: Gram Panchayat

Population
  - Total: 1,443

Languages
  - Official: Telugu
- Time zone: UTC+5:30 (IST)
- PIN: 532264
- Vehicle registration: AP-30

Pothrakonda is a village in Srikakulam district of the Indian state of Andhra Pradesh. It is located in Sompeta mandal .

== Demographics ==
Pothrakonda village has population of 1,443 of which 728 are males while 715 are females as per Population 2011, Indian Census.
