= Pesarapadu =

- Village
- Interactive map of Pesarapadu
- Location in Andhra Pradesh, India
- Coordinates: 18.7394°N 84.4273°E
- Country: India
- State: Andhra Pradesh
- District: Srikakulam
- Elevation: 42 m (138 ft)

Languages
  - Official: Telugu
- Time zone: UTC+5:30 (IST)

Pesarapadu is a village in Srikakulam district of the Indian state of Andhra Pradesh. It located in Palasa mandal.
