= Tekkali revenue division =

- Revenue division in Srikakulam district
- Country: India
- State: Andhra Pradesh
- District: Srikakulam

Population (2011)
  - Total: 899,280

Tekkali revenue division (or Tekkali division) is a revenue division in the Srikakulam district of the Indian state of Andhra Pradesh. It is one of the three revenue divisions in the district with ten mandals under its administration. The divisional headquarters are located at Tekkali.

== Administration ==
The 10 mandals administered under the revenue division.

No.	Mandals
1	Tekkali mandal
2	Santhabommali mandal
3	Kotabommali mandal
4	Pathapatnam mandal
5	Meliaputti mandal
6	Saravakota mandal
7	Kothuru mandal
8	Hiramandalam mandal
9	Laxminarasupeta mandal
10	Nandigam mandal

== Demographics ==
At the time of the 2011 census, the division had a population of 8,99,280. The rural population is 7,57,871 and the urban population is 1,41,409. Scheduled Castes and Scheduled Tribes make up 6.50% and 4.63% of the population respectively.

98.99% of the population are Hindus and 0.53% are Christians.

At the time of the 2011 census, 85.49% of the population spoke Telugu and 13.07% Odia as their first language.

== See also ==
- List of revenue divisions in Andhra Pradesh
- List of mandals in Andhra Pradesh
