= Palasa revenue division =

Revenue division in Srikakulam district, Andhra Pradesh, India

- Revenue division
- Country: India
- State: Andhra Pradesh
- District: Srikakulam
- Formed: 4 April 2022
- Founder: Government of Andhra Pradesh
- Time zone: UTC+05:30 (IST)

Palasa revenue division is an administrative division in the Srikakulam district of the Indian state of Andhra Pradesh. It is one of the three revenue divisions in the district and comprises 7 mandals. It was formed on 4 April 2022.

== Administration ==
The revenue division comprises 7 mandals: Ichchapuram, Kanchili, Kaviti, Mandasa, Palasa, Sompeta, and Vajrapukottur.
