= Budithi bell and brass craft =

- Geographical indication
- Type: Handicraft
- Area: Budithi, Srikakulam district, Andhra Pradesh
- Country: India
- Material: Bronze

Budithi bell and brass craft are the products made out of alloy like brass at Budithi, a village in Srikakulam district of the Indian state of Andhra Pradesh.

== Recognition ==
It was registered as one of the handicraft in the geographical indication from Andhra Pradesh by Geographical Indications of Goods (Registration and Protection) Act, 1999.

== Brass objects ==
The artisans mainly work on creating brassware objects such as, bells for temples, cooking utensils, flower pots, lamps etc., which have different geometric patterns as well.

== See also ==
- Bidriware
- Kinnal Craft
- Navalgund Durries
