= Laveru =

- Village
- Interactive map of Laveru
- Location in Andhra Pradesh, India Laveru (India)
- Coordinates: 18°14′16″N 83°41′31″E
- Country: India
- State: Andhra Pradesh
- District: Srikakulam
- Talukas: Laveru

Population (2011)
  - Total: 5,387

Languages
  - Official: Telugu
- Time zone: UTC+5:30 (IST)
- Vehicle Registration: AP30 (Former); AP39 (from 30 January 2019)

Laveru is a village in Srikakulam district of the Indian state of Andhra Pradesh. Laveru is located on Subhadrapuram-Cheepurupalli road that connects National Highway-5 to Cheepurupalli railway station on Howrah-Chennai mainline. The village is located in Pedda Gedda river basin.

== Demographics ==
As of 2011 census, had a population of 5,387. The total population constitute, 2,759 males and 2,628 females —a sex ratio of 953 females per 1000 males. 554 children are in the age group of 0–6 years, of which 292 are boys and 262 are girls —a ratio of 897 per 1000. The average literacy rate stands at 57.25% with 2,767 literates, significantly higher than the state average of 67.41%.
