= Santhabommali =

Coordinates: 18°31′38″N 84°09′11″E

Santha Bommali
- Village
- Interactive map of Santha Bommali
- Country: India
- State: Andhra Pradesh
- District: Srikakulam
- Talukas: Santha Bommali

Languages
  - Official: Telugu
- Time zone: UTC+5:30 (IST)
- PIN: 532195
- Vehicle Registration: AP30 (Former); AP39 (from 30 January 2019)
- Lok Sabha constituency: Srikakulam
- Vidhan Sabha constituency: Tekkali

Santhabommali is a village in Srikakulam district of the Indian state of Andhra Pradesh.

== Demographics ==
As of 2001 Indian census, the demographic details of Santhabommali mandal is as follows:

- Total Population: 64,845 in 14,585 Households
- Male Population: 32,198 and Female Population: 32,647
- Children Under 6-years of age: 9,171 (Boys - 4,595 and Girls - 4,576)
- Total Literates: 27,166
