= Chapara =

- Village
- Interactive map of Chapara
- Location in Andhra Pradesh, India Chapara (India)
- Coordinates: 18.771690°N 84.185694°E
- Country: India
- State: Andhra Pradesh
- District: Srikakulam
- Talukas: Meliaputti

Area
  - Total: 2.30 km^{2} (0.89 sq mi)

Population (2011)
  - Total: 7,741
  - Density: 3,370/km^{2} (8,720/sq mi)

Languages
  - Official: Telugu
- Time zone: UTC+5:30 (IST)
- PIN: 532216
- Vehicle Registration: AP30 (Former); AP39 (from 30 January 2019)
- Lok Sabha constituency: Srikakulam
- Vidhan Sabha constituency: Pathapatnam

Chapara is a village in Srikakulam district of the Indian state of Andhra Pradesh. It is located in Meliaputti mandal of Palakonda revenue division.
