= Tekkali =

- Census Town
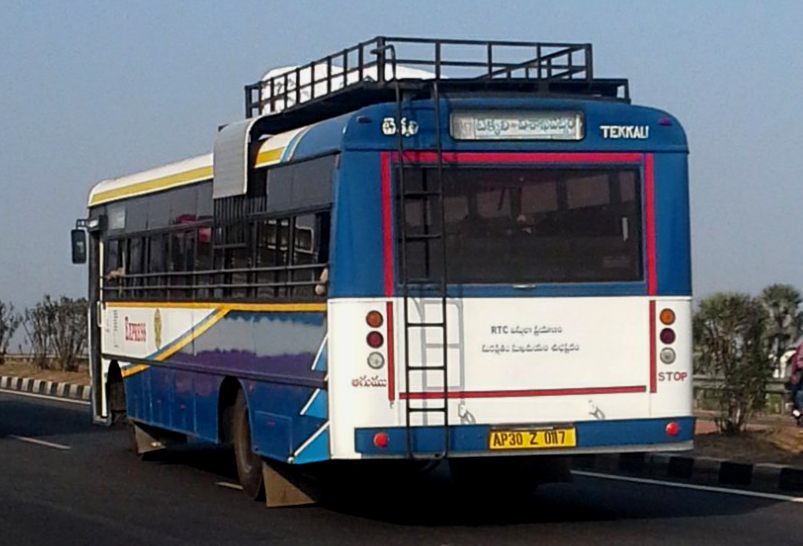
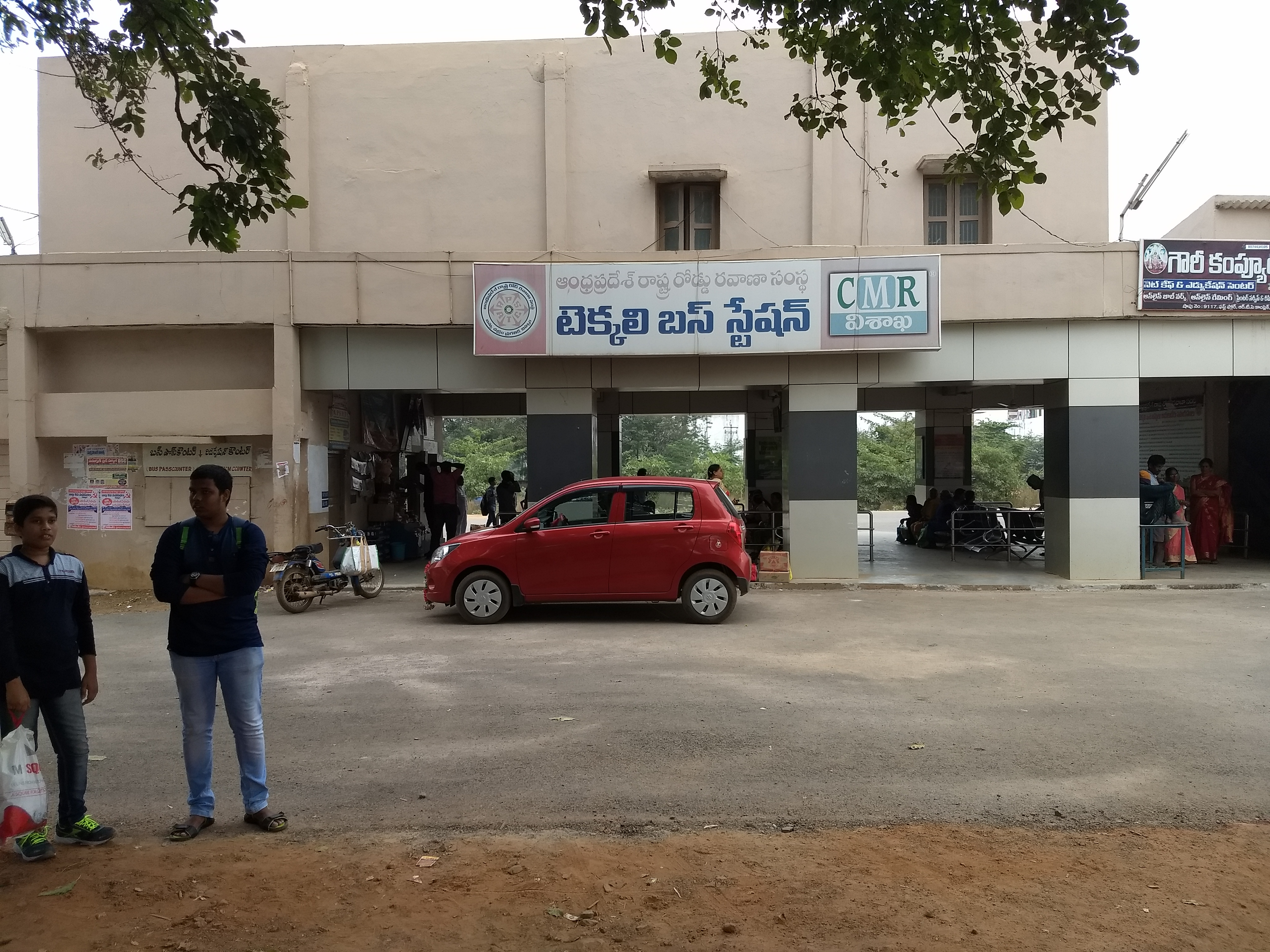
- An APSRTC Express bus bound to Tekkali from Visakhapatnam APSRTC bus station, Tekkali

- Location in Andhra Pradesh, India
- Coordinates: 18.6167°N 84.2333°E
- Country: India
- State: Andhra Pradesh
- District: Srikakulam

Government
  - MLA: Atchannaidu Kinjarapu

Area
  - Total: 13.58 km^{2} (5.24 sq mi)

Population (2011)
  - Total: 28,631
  - Density: 2,108/km^{2} (5,461/sq mi)
- Time zone: UTC+5:30
- PIN: 532201
- Telephone code: 91–8945
- Vehicle registration: AP-30 (former); AP–39 (from 30 January 2019)

Tekkali is a census town in Srikakulam district of the Indian state of Andhra Pradesh. It is the mandal headquarters of Tekkali mandal and Tekkali revenue division and is located at a distance of 51 km from the district headquarters.

== Etymology ==
The town derives its name from the eponymous medicinal tree. The Latin botanical name of Tekkali plant is Clerodendrum phlomides Linn. It belongs to the family Verbenacae. The Tekkali chettu (tree) is known by various alternate names too in various regions of Andhra Pradesh. For instance, it's also known by the name of Nelli (నెల్లి) from which Nellore City in Nellore district, and Nellimarla Town in Vizianagaram district are said to derive their names.

== Geography ==
Tekkali is located at 18.6167°N 83.2333°E. It has an average elevation of 27 meters (91 feet). It lies on the coast of Bay of Bengal with an area of 275 square miles.

== Connectivity ==
The nearest airport is the Alluri Sitarama Raju International Airport, which is at a distance of 150 km. National Highway 16 (Chennai - Kolkata) passes through the town. It is well connected with the nearest towns of Nandigam, Palasa, Meliaputti, Chapara, Sompeta, Mandasa, Kaviti, Itchapuram, Narasannapeta, Pathapatnam, Paralakhemundi and the district headquarter Srikakulam. Tekkali is 50 km away from Srikakulam headquarter.

There is a Railway station in Tekkali. Another nearby railway station is at Naupada called Naupada Junction (NWP). Naupada Junction is 4 km from Tekkali and is accessible by autorickshaws and private bus services.

== Demography ==
According to The Imperial Gazetteer of India, Tekkali in 1901 was a Zamindari tahsil in Ganjam district of Madras province.

== Education ==
The primary and secondary school education is enabled by government, government-aided and private schools, under the School Education Department of the state of Andhra Pradesh. The medium of instruction followed by different schools are English and Telugu.

== Politics ==
Nandhamuri Taraka Rama Rao represented this assembly constituency in Andhra Pradesh General Legislative assembly Elections 1994.
