= Pydibhimavaram =

- village
- Nickname: bhimavaram
- Interactive map of Pydibhimavaram
- Location in Andhra Pradesh, India
- Country: India
- State: Andhra Pradesh

Languages
  - Official: Telugu
- Time zone: UTC+5:30 (IST)
- Vehicle registration: AP

Pydi-bhimavaram is a village located in Ranastalam mandal in Srikakulam district, Andhra Pradesh, India.

In the 2011 census it had a population of 3444 in 870 households.
