= Lakshminarasupeta =

Coordinates: 18°36′59″N 83°57′44″E

- village
- Interactive map of Lakshminarasupeta
- Country: India
- State: Andhra Pradesh
- District: Srikakulam
- Talukas: Lakshminarasupeta

Languages
  - Official: Telugu
- Time zone: UTC+5:30 (IST)
- PIN: 532458
- Vehicle Registration: AP30 (Former); AP39 (from 30 January 2019)

Lakshminarasupeta is a village in Srikakulam district of the Indian state of Andhra Pradesh.
