= Salihundam =

- Protected Buddhist Monument Complex
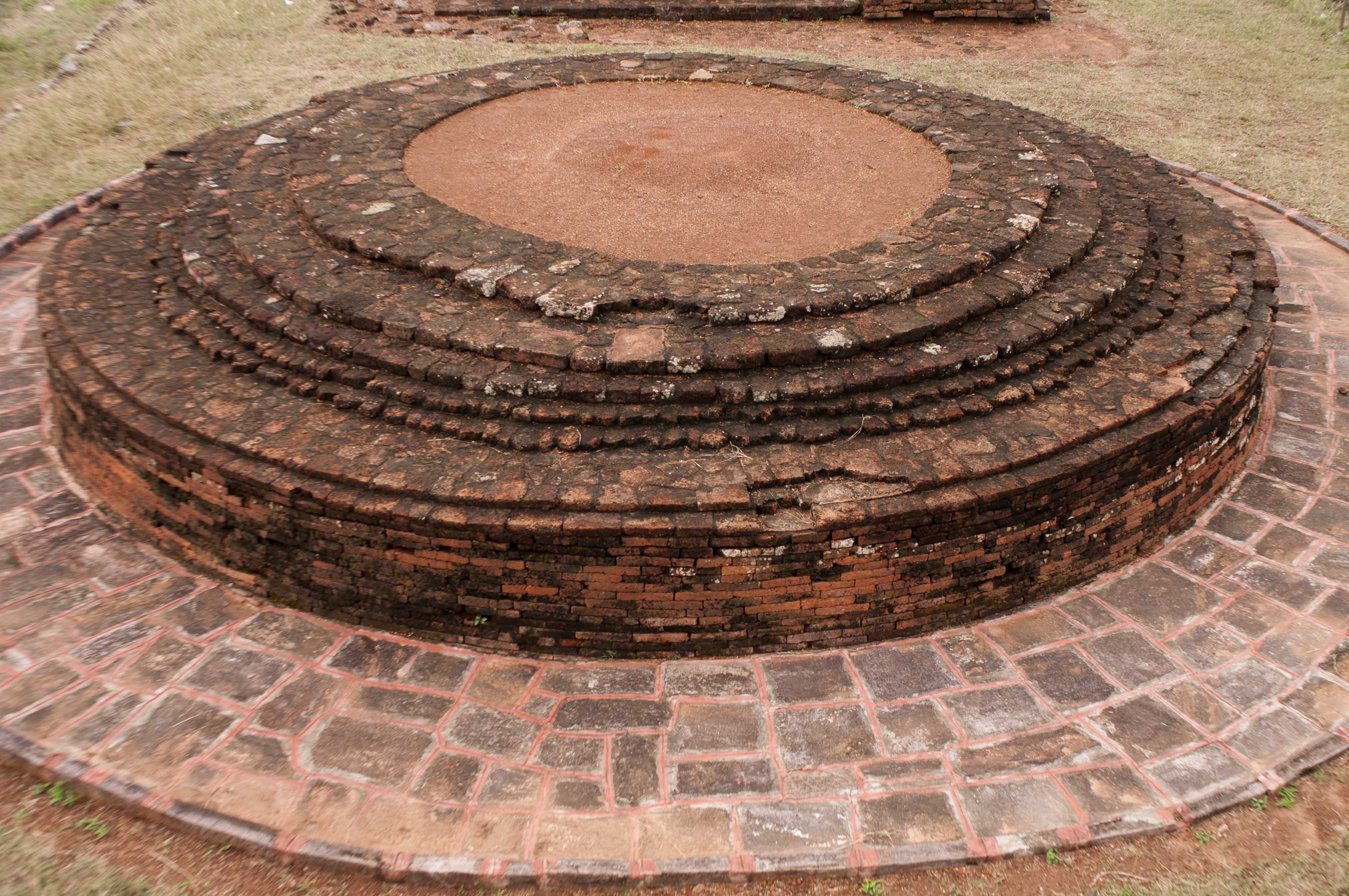
- Salihundam Buddhist Stupa
- Interactive map of Salihundam
- Location in Andhra Pradesh, India
- Coordinates: 18°20′00″N 84°03′00″E
- Country: India
- State: Andhra Pradesh
- District: Srikakulam

Languages
  - Official: Telugu
- Time zone: UTC+5:30 (IST)
- PIN: 532405
- Telephone code: 91–08942
- Vehicle Registration: AP30 (Former); AP39 (from 30 January 2019)
- Nearest city: Visakhapatnam
- Lok Sabha constituency: Srikakulam
- Vidhan Sabha constituency: Srikakulam

Salihundam, is a village and panchayat in Gara Mandal of Srikakulam district in Andhra Pradesh. It is a historically important Buddhist monument of ancient Kalinga and a major tourist attraction It is a village lying on top of the hill on the south bank of the Vamsadhara River. It is at a distance of 5 KM west to Kalingapatnam and 10 KM from Singupuram and 18 KM from Srikakulam town. It was known as Salipetaka (meaning rice emporium in Telugu).

== Buddhist Monuments ==
There are a number of Buddhist stupas and a huge monastic complex on a hillock amidst scenic surroundings. The site was first discovered by Gidugu Venkata Rama Murthy in 1919. Four stupas, relic caskets, and architectural shrines were discovered during digging performed by state authorities, as well as sculptures of Buddhist deities Mareechi and Tara. All of the remnants were built between the 2nd century and 12th century, reflecting the different times of Buddhism: Mahayana, Theravada and Vajrayana. Buddhism spread to Sumatra and other far-eastern countries from here.

Salihundam is one of the main Buddhist excavation sites, showing evidence that Buddhism thrived in the local area during the 2nd and 3rd centuries.

== See also ==
- Rajgir
- Sanchi
- Vaishali
- Kapilvastu
- Kushinagar
- Nalanda
- Sravasti
- Ajanta and Ellora Caves
- Amaravathi
- Bavikonda
- Bodh Gaya
- Nagarjunakonda
- Sarnath
- Thotlakonda
- Ghantasala

== Gallery ==
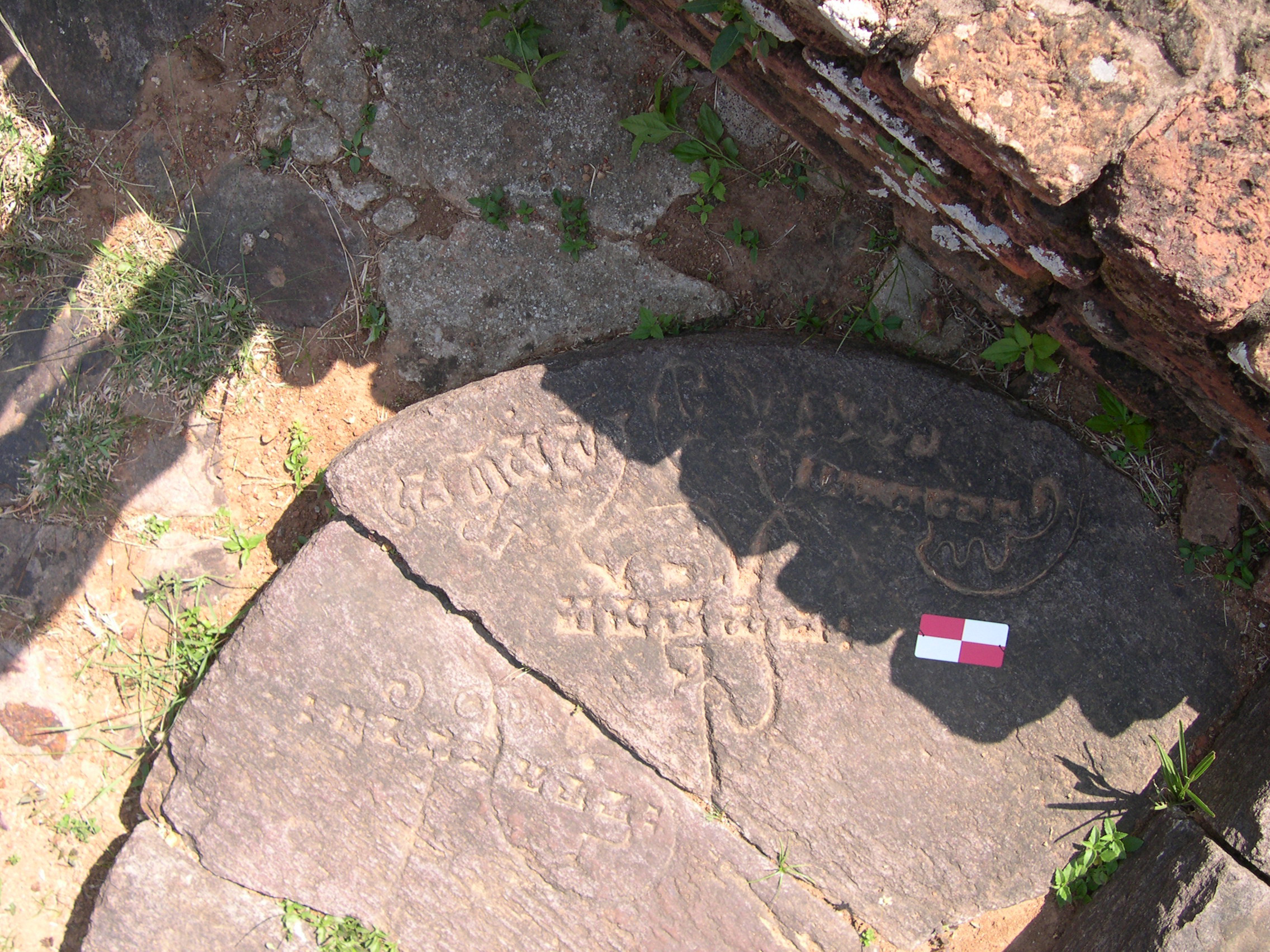

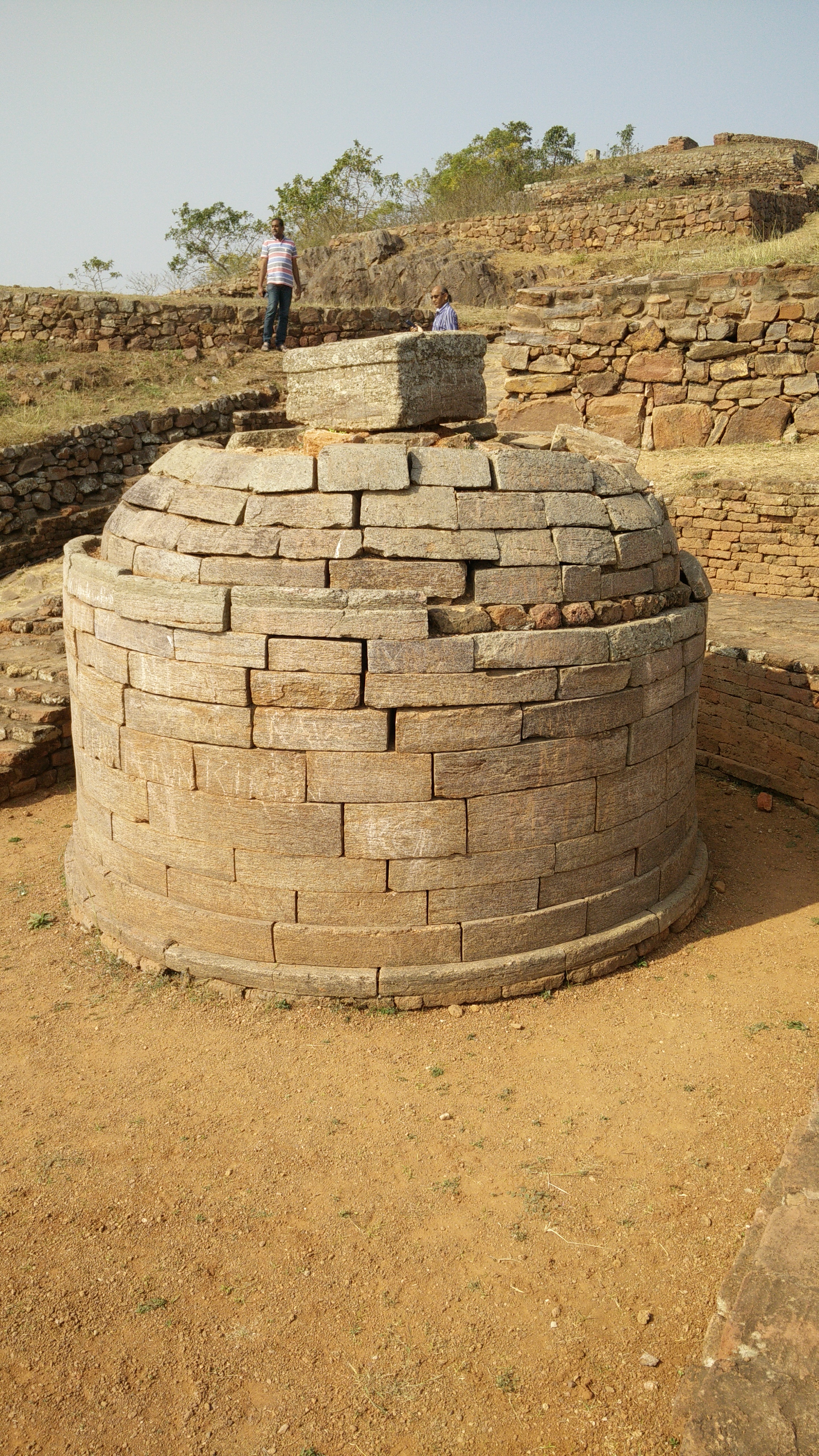

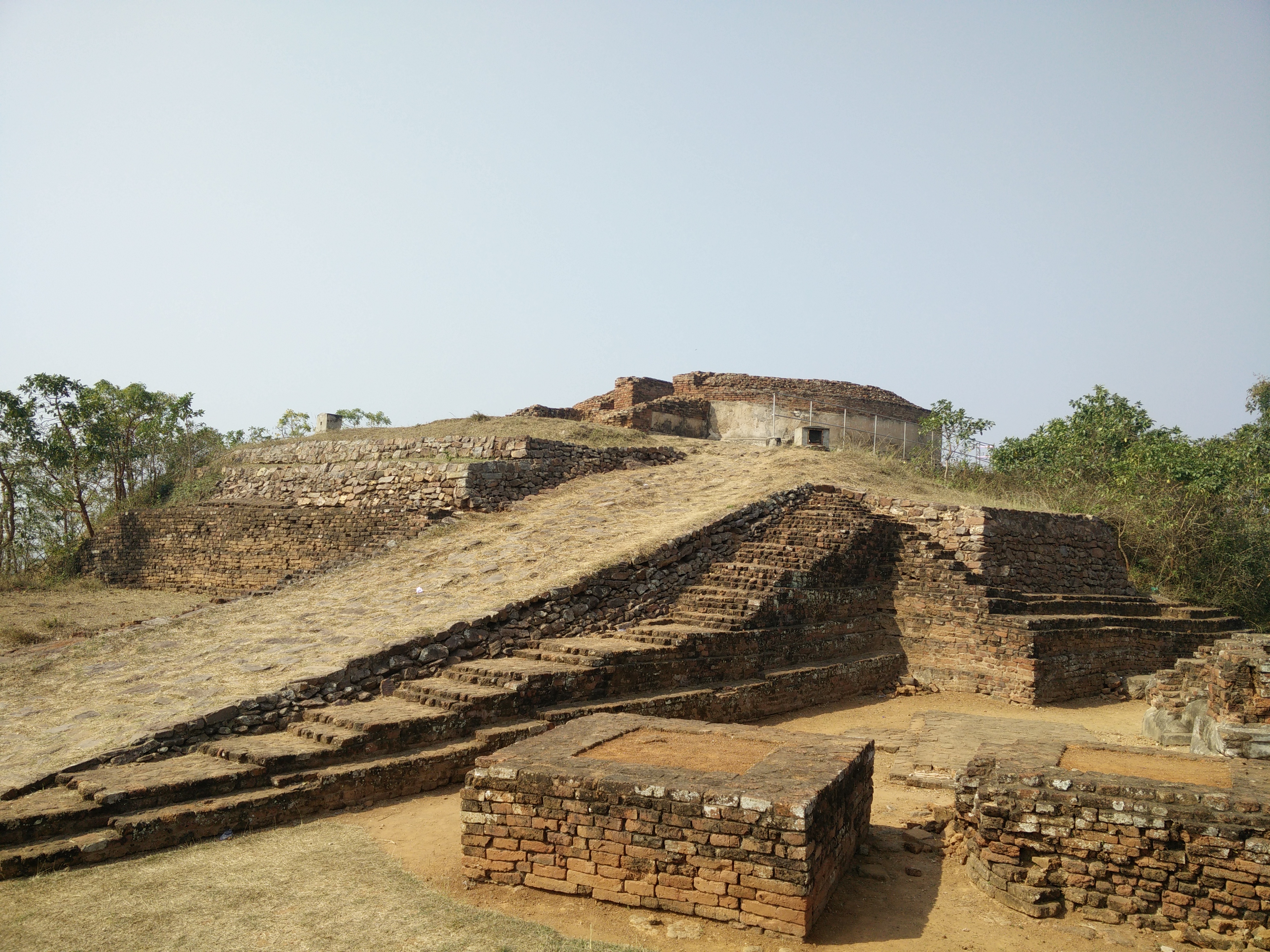

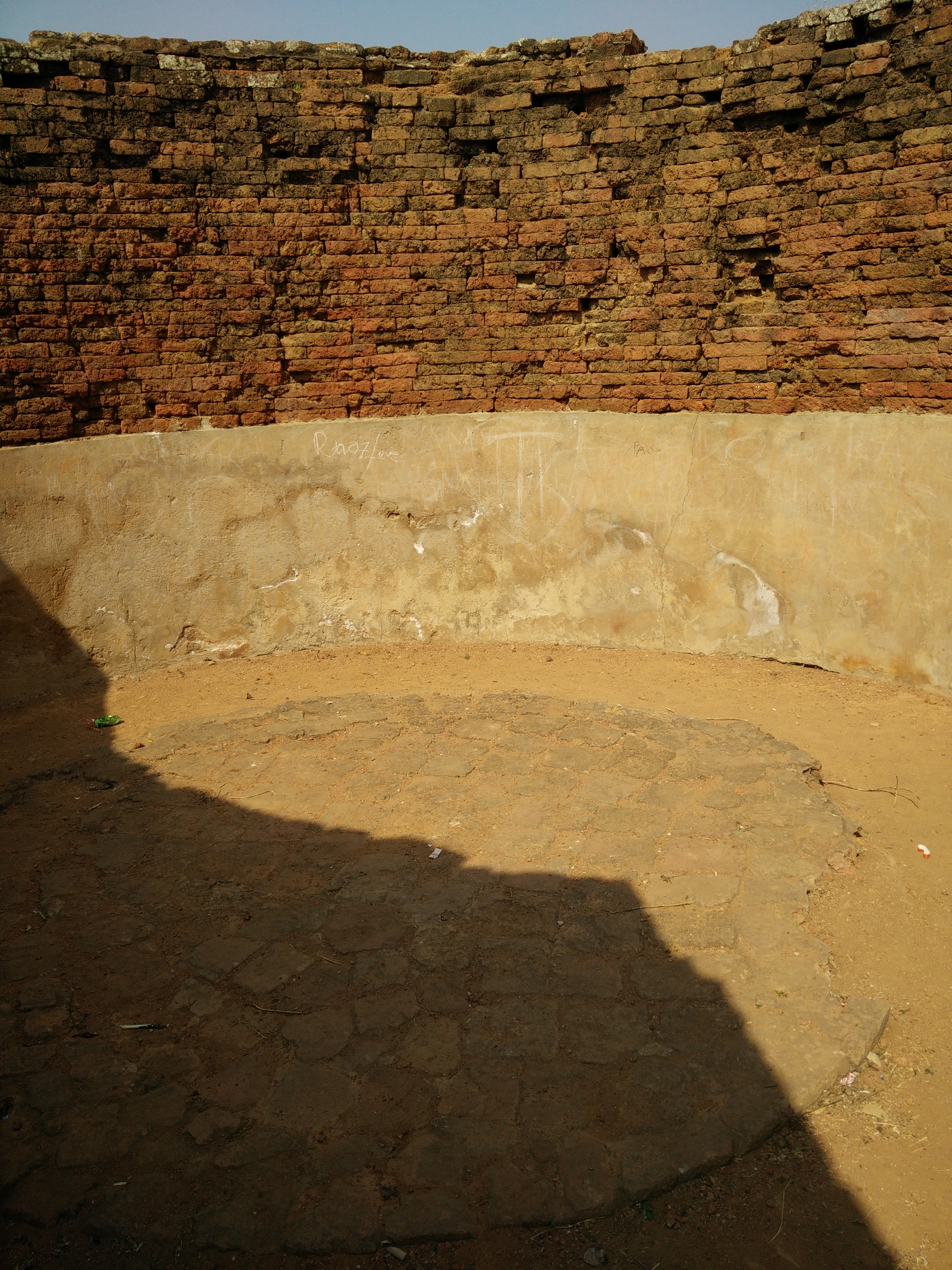
