= Hiramandalam =

Hiramandalam Hiramandalam
- Census Town
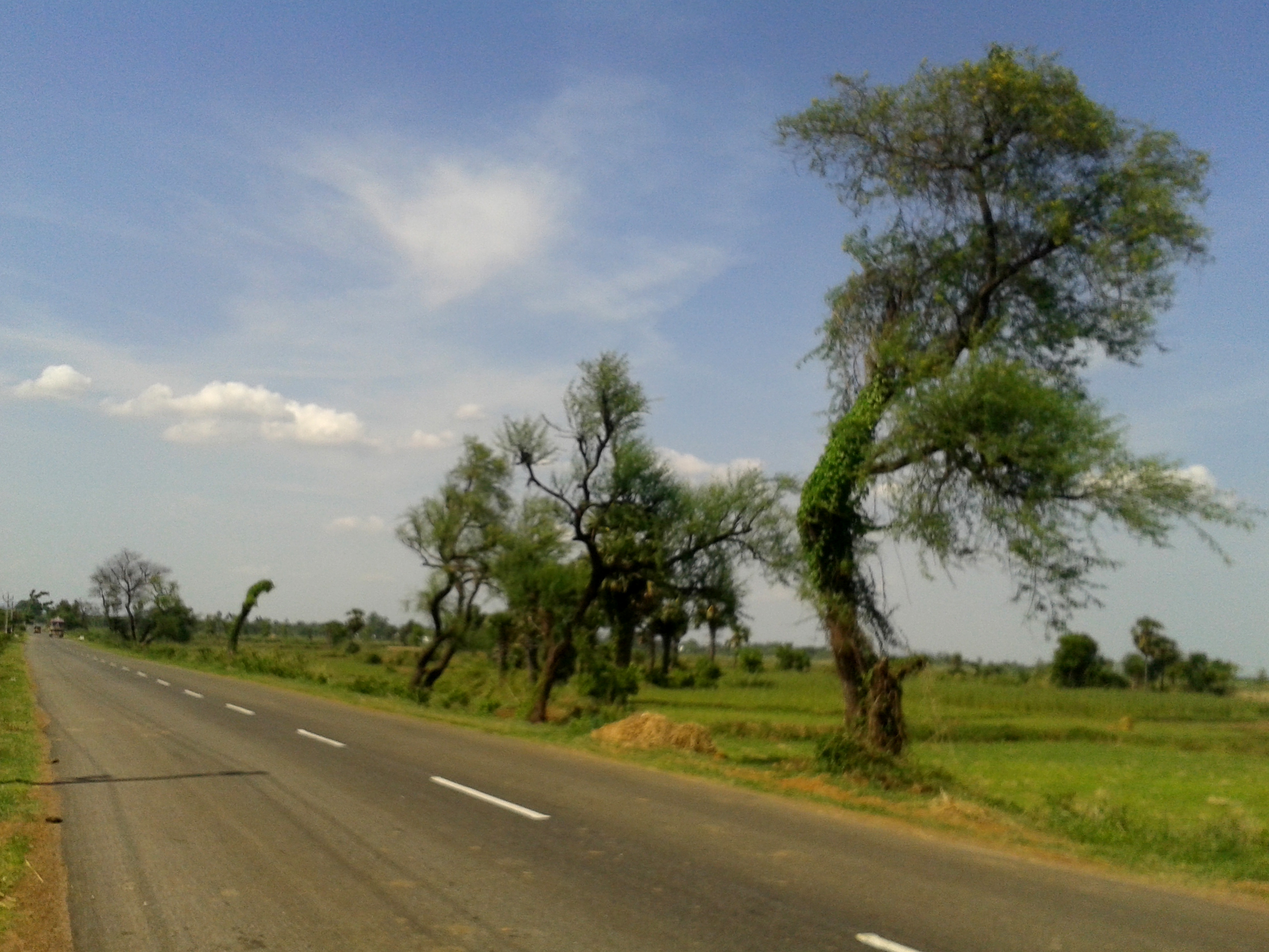
- Hiramandalam Road at Dannanapeta
- Nickname: హీరమండలం
- Location in Andhra Pradesh, India
- Coordinates: 18.6667°N 83.9500°E
- Country: India
- State: Andhra Pradesh
- District: Srikakulam

Area
  - Total: 2.55 km^{2} (0.98 sq mi)

Population (2011)
  - Total: 6,603
  - Density: 2,590/km^{2} (6,710/sq mi)

Languages
  - Official: Telugu
- Time zone: UTC+5:30 (IST)
- PIN: 532 459
- Vehicle Registration: AP 39

Hiramandalam is a census town in Srikakulam district of the Indian state of Andhra Pradesh. It is also the mandal headquarters of Hiramandalam mandal in Palakonda revenue division. BRR Project Located at Hiramandalam town. It is located 49 km towards South from nearest town Srikakulam.

== Geography ==
Hiramandalam is located at 18.6667°N 83.9500°E. It has an average elevation of 27 meters (91 feet).

== Demographics ==
According to Indian census, 2001, the demographic details of Hiramandalam mandal is as follows:

- Total Population: 46,204 in 11,055 Households
- Male Population: 22,954 and Female Population: 23,250

F > M

- Children Under 6 Yrs: 6,347 (Boys - 3,162 and Girls - 3,185)

F > M

- Total Literates: 22,780

== Education ==
The primary and secondary school education is imparted by government, aided and private schools, under the School Education Department of the state. The medium of instruction followed by different schools are English, Telugu.
