= Burja, Srikakulam district =

Coordinates: 18°32′39″N 83°50′07″E

Burja
- Village
- Interactive map of Burja
- Country: India
- State: Andhra Pradesh
- District: Srikakulam
- Talukas: Burja

Languages
  - Official: Telugu
- Time zone: UTC+5:30 (IST)
- Postal code: 532445
- Vehicle Registration: AP30 (Former); AP39 (from 30 January 2019)
- Lok Sabha constituency: Srikakulam
- Vidhan Sabha constituency: Amadalavalasa

Burja or Boorja is a village in Srikakulam district of the Indian state of Andhra Pradesh. Burja is located near River Nagavali.

Burja mandal is bordered by Regidi Amadalavalasa, Santhakavati, Palakonda, Seethampeta, Sarubujjili and Amadalavalasa mandals of Srikakulam district.

== Narayanapuram project ==
The Narayanapuram Ayacut Project was constructed across the Nagavali River. The Project is located near the Narayanapuram village to irrigate a total ayacut of 33,701 acres (13,638 ha) in the Srikakulam district.
