= Nandigam, Srikakulam district =

Nandigam
- Village
- Interactive map of Nandigam
- Location in Andhra Pradesh, India Nandigam (India)
- Coordinates: 18.6542°N 84.3050°E
- Country: India
- State: Andhra Pradesh
- District: Srikakulam
- Elevation: 11 m (36 ft)

Languages
  - Official: Telugu
- Time zone: UTC+5:30 (IST)
- Postal code: 532201
- Vehicle Registration: AP30 (former); AP39 (from 30 January 2019)

Nandigam is a village near major town Palasa in Srikakulam district of the Indian state of Andhra Pradesh. It is located in Nandigam mandal.

== Geography ==
Nandigama is located at 18.39N 84.18E. It has an average elevation of 11 meters (39 feet) above mean sea level.
