= Kotturu Tadepalli =

Kothuru
- Neighborhood
- Interactive map of Kothuru
- Location in Andhra Pradesh, India Kothuru (India)
- Coordinates: 18.7029°N 84.2345°E
- Country: India
- State: Andhra Pradesh
- District: NTR

Area
  - Total: 7.09 km^{2} (2.74 sq mi)

Population (2011)
  - Total: 1,052
  - Density: 148/km^{2} (384/sq mi)

Languages
  - Official: Telugu
- Time zone: UTC+5:30 (IST)

Kotturu Tadepalli (Kothuru) is located in North Western part of Vijayawada in the Indian state of Andhra Pradesh. It is a village falls under Vijayawada Rural mandal in Vijayawada revenue division of NTR district. There is a proposal to merge this village into Vijayawada Municipal Corporation (VMC) to form a Greater Vijayawada Municipal Corporation.

== See also ==
- Vijayawada (rural) mandal
