= Thotapalle, Nagaram mandal =

Thotapalle
- Village
- Interactive map of Thotapalle
- Location in Andhra Pradesh, India
- Coordinates: 16°03′00″N 80°44′43″E
- Country: India
- State: Andhra Pradesh
- District: Bapatla

Languages
  - Official: Telugu
- Time zone: UTC+5:30 (IST)
- PIN: 522259
- Vehicle registration: AP
- Nearest city: Reapalle
- Lok Sabha constituency: Bapatla
- Vidhan Sabha constituency: Repalle

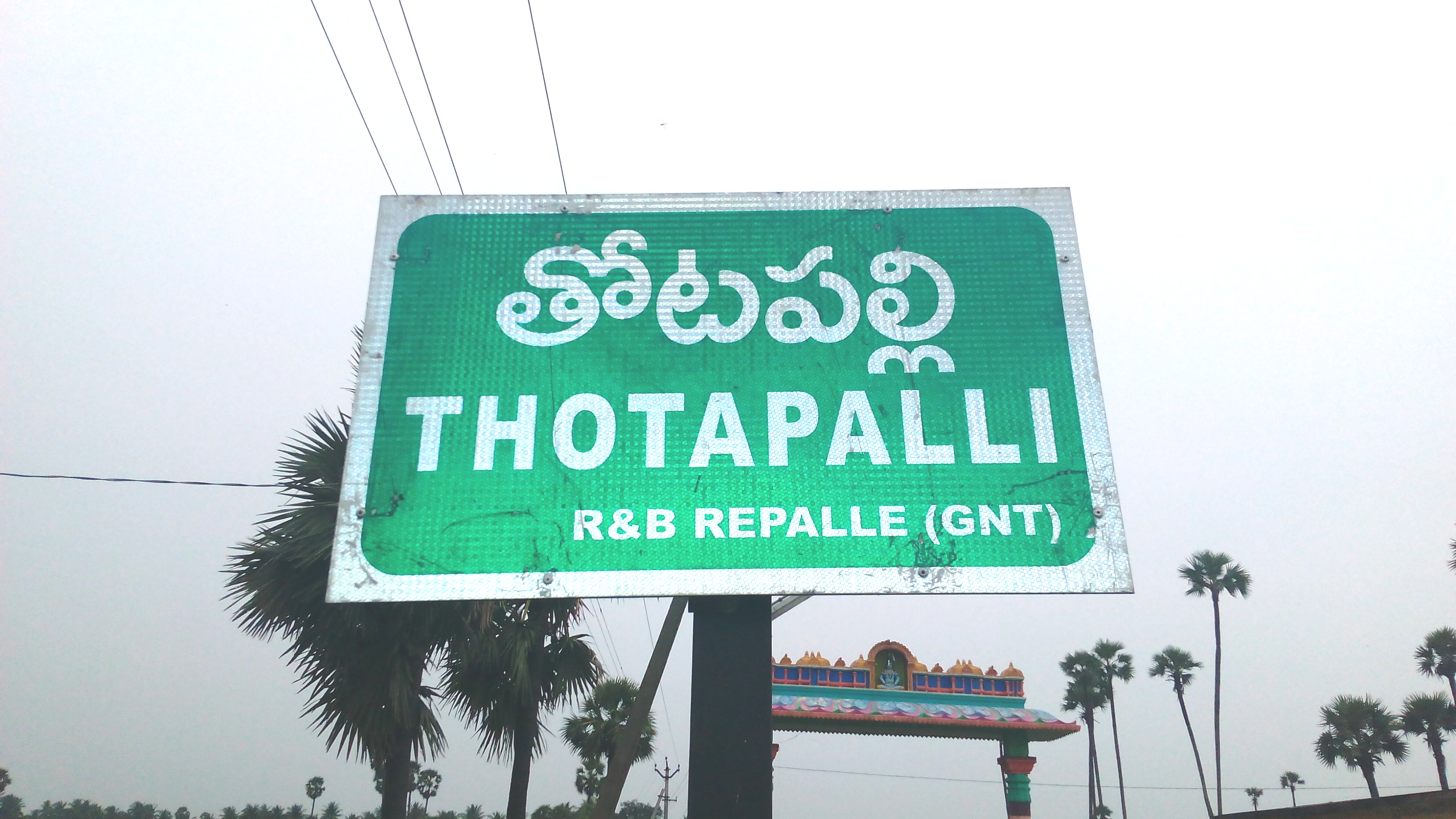

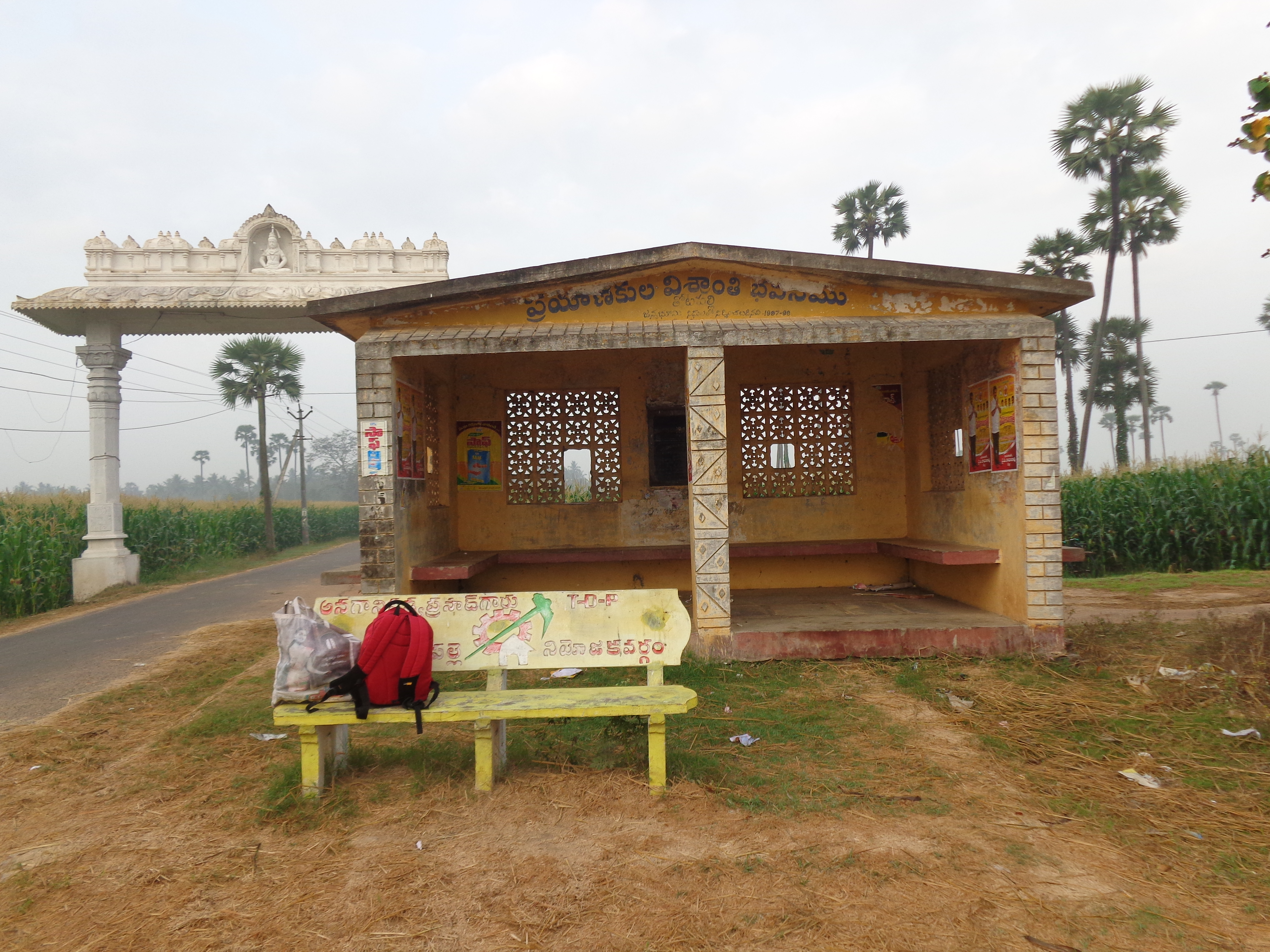

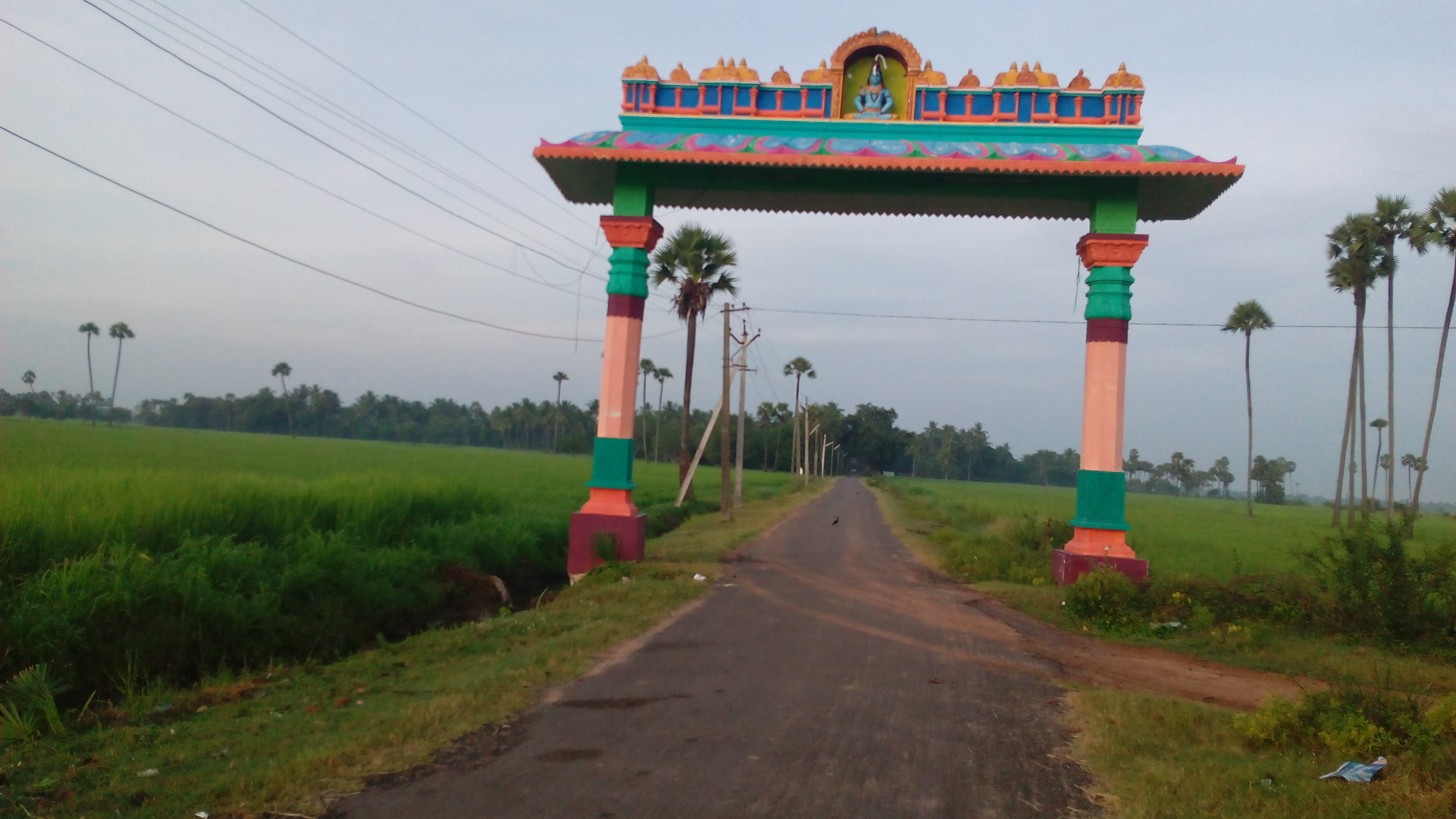

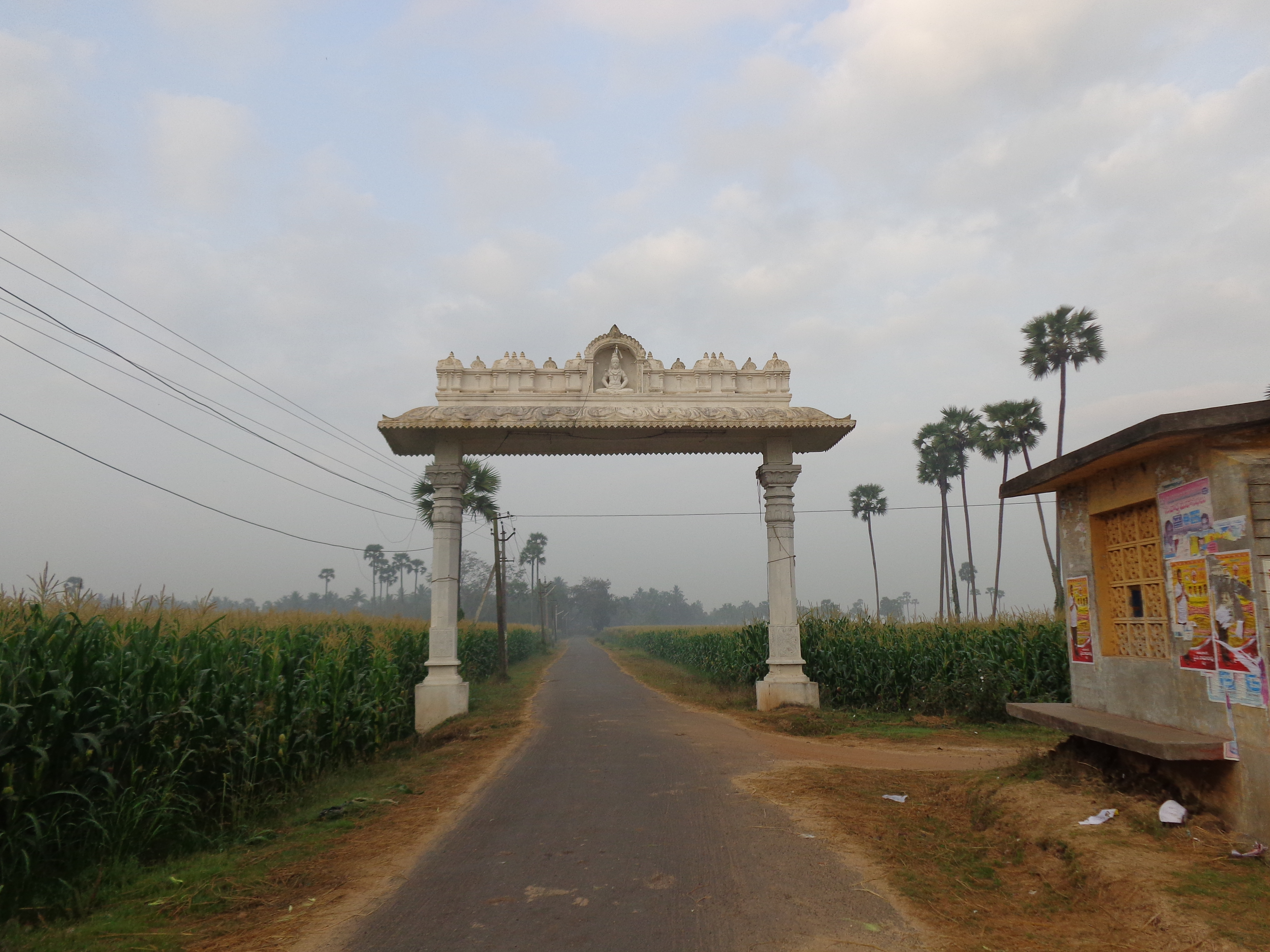

Thotapalle is a village in Nagaram mandal, Bapatla district, Andhra Pradesh, India. In 2011, it had a population of 1082.
