= Polaki, Srikakulam district =

Polaki
- Village
- Interactive map of Polaki
- Location in Andhra Pradesh, India Polaki (India)
- Coordinates: 18.3667°N 84.1000°E
- Country: India
- State: Andhra Pradesh
- District: Srikakulam
- Talukas: Polaki
- Elevation: 22 m (72 ft)

Population (2011)
  - Total: 7,089

Languages
  - Official: Telugu
- Time zone: UTC+5:30 (IST)
- PIN: 532429
- Telephone code: 08942
- Vehicle Registration: AP30 (Former); AP39 (from 30 January 2019)
- Lok Sabha constituency: Srikakulam
- Vidhan Sabha constituency: Narasannapeta

Polaki is a village in Srikakulam district of Andhra Pradesh in India.

It is the Mandal headquarters of Polaki Mandal.

== Geography ==
Polaki is located at 18.3667°N 84.1000°E. It has an average elevation of 8 m (26 ft)

== Demographics ==
As of 2011 census, had a population of 7,089. The total population constitute, 3,486 males and 3,603 females —a sex ratio of 1034 females per 1000 males. 653 children are in the age group of 0–6 years, of which 314 are boys and 339 are girls —a ratio of 1080 per 1000. The average literacy rate stands at 69.92% with 4,500 literates, significantly higher than the state average of 67.41%.

== Archaeological Importance ==
- Deerghasi is a village in Polaki Mandal where ancient Telugu inscriptions are present.

== Religious Importance ==
- Sri Venkateswara Swamy Temple in Borigivalasa village of Polaki Mandal is famous which attracts many devotees.
- Sri Kanaka Durgamma Temple in Polaki village is famous for Jathara on Bheesma Ekadasi.
