= Kotturu, Srikakulam district =

Kotturu
- Village
- Interactive map of Kotturu
- Location in Andhra Pradesh, India Kotturu (India)
- Coordinates: 18.7667°N 83.8833°E
- Country: India
- State: Andhra Pradesh
- District: Srikakulam

Area
  - Total: 5.07 km^{2} (1.96 sq mi)

Population (2011)
  - Total: 8,209
  - Density: 1,620/km^{2} (4,190/sq mi)

Languages
  - Official: Telugu
- Time zone: UTC+5:30 (IST)
- Postal code: 532455
- Vehicle Registration: AP30 (Former); AP39 (from 30 January 2019)

Kotturu is a village in Srikakulam district of the Indian state of Andhra Pradesh. It is located in Kothuru mandal of Palakonda revenue division.

== Geography ==
Kotturu is located at 18.7667°N 83.8833°E. It has an average elevation of 59 meters (196 feet).

Kotturu's economic position is improving.

== Assembly constituency ==
Kothuru was an Assembly Constituency in Andhra Pradesh. However, Kothuru Assembly Constituency ceased to exist as an assembly constituency as per the delimitation process recently carried out.

- 1978: Viswasarai Narasimha Rao, Indian National Congress
- 1983: Nimmaka Gopal Rao, Telugu Desam Party
- 1985: Viswasarai Narasimha Rao, Indian National Congress
- 1989: Nimmaka Gopal Rao, Telugu Desam Party
- 1994: Nimmaka Gopal Rao, Telugu Desam Party
- 1999: Nimmaka Gopal Rao, Telugu Desam Party
- 2004: Janni Minathi Gomango Indian National Congress
