= Etcherla =

- Village
- Interactive map of Etcherla
- Location in Andhra Pradesh, India
- Coordinates: 18.2820684°N 83.8247623°E
- Country: India
- State: Andhra Pradesh
- District: Srikakulam
- Talukas: Etcherla

Government
  - MLA: Gorle Kiran Kumar

Languages
  - Official: Telugu
- Time zone: UTC+5:30 (IST)
- PIN: 532410
- Telephone code: 08942
- Vehicle Registration: AP30 (former); AP39 (from 30 January 2019)

Etcherla is a village in Srikakulam district of the Indian state of Andhra Pradesh. It is the mandal headquarters of Etcherla mandal. Most of the people in this region speak Telugu.
