= Srikakulam district =

- District of Andhra Pradesh
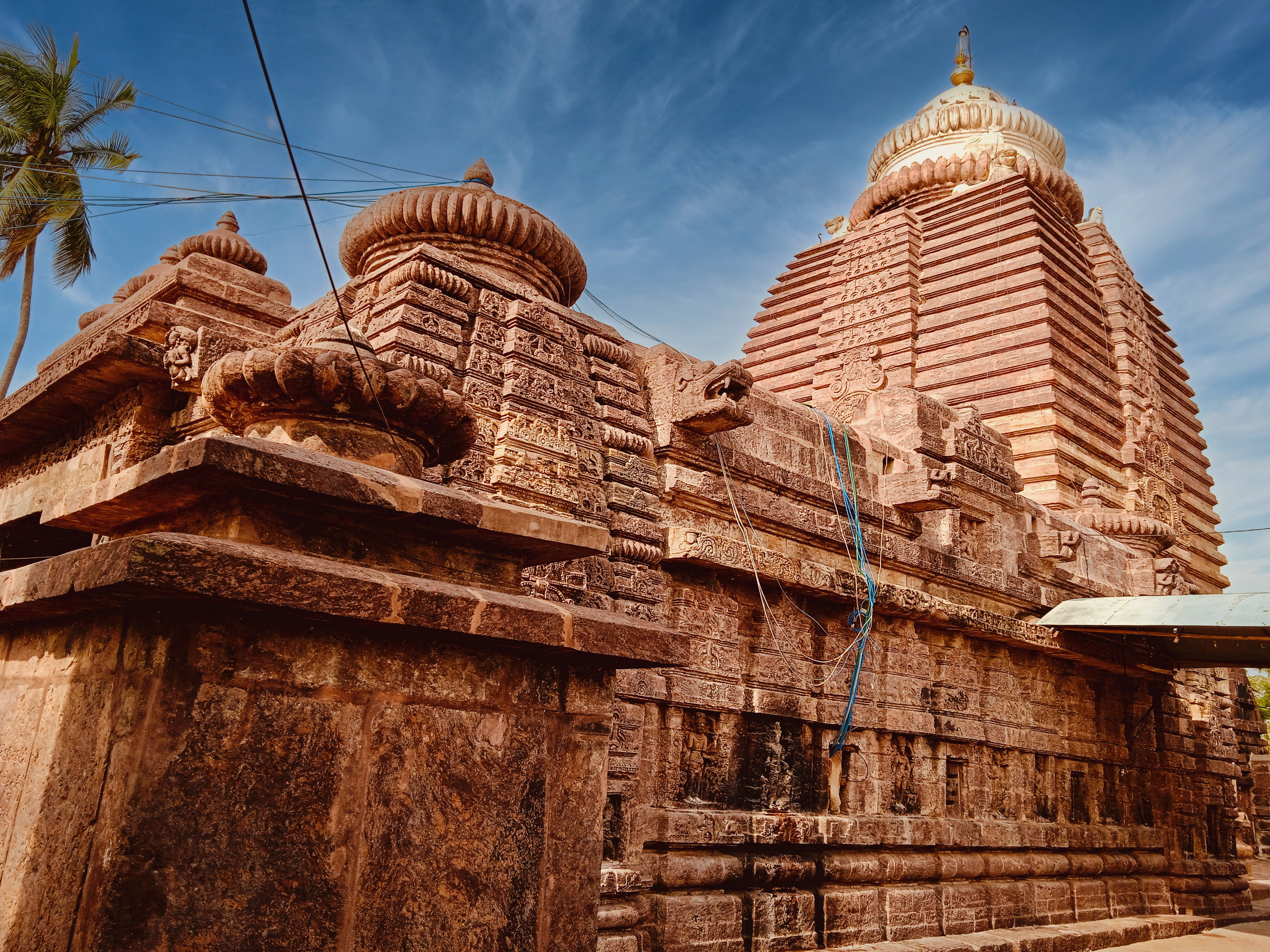
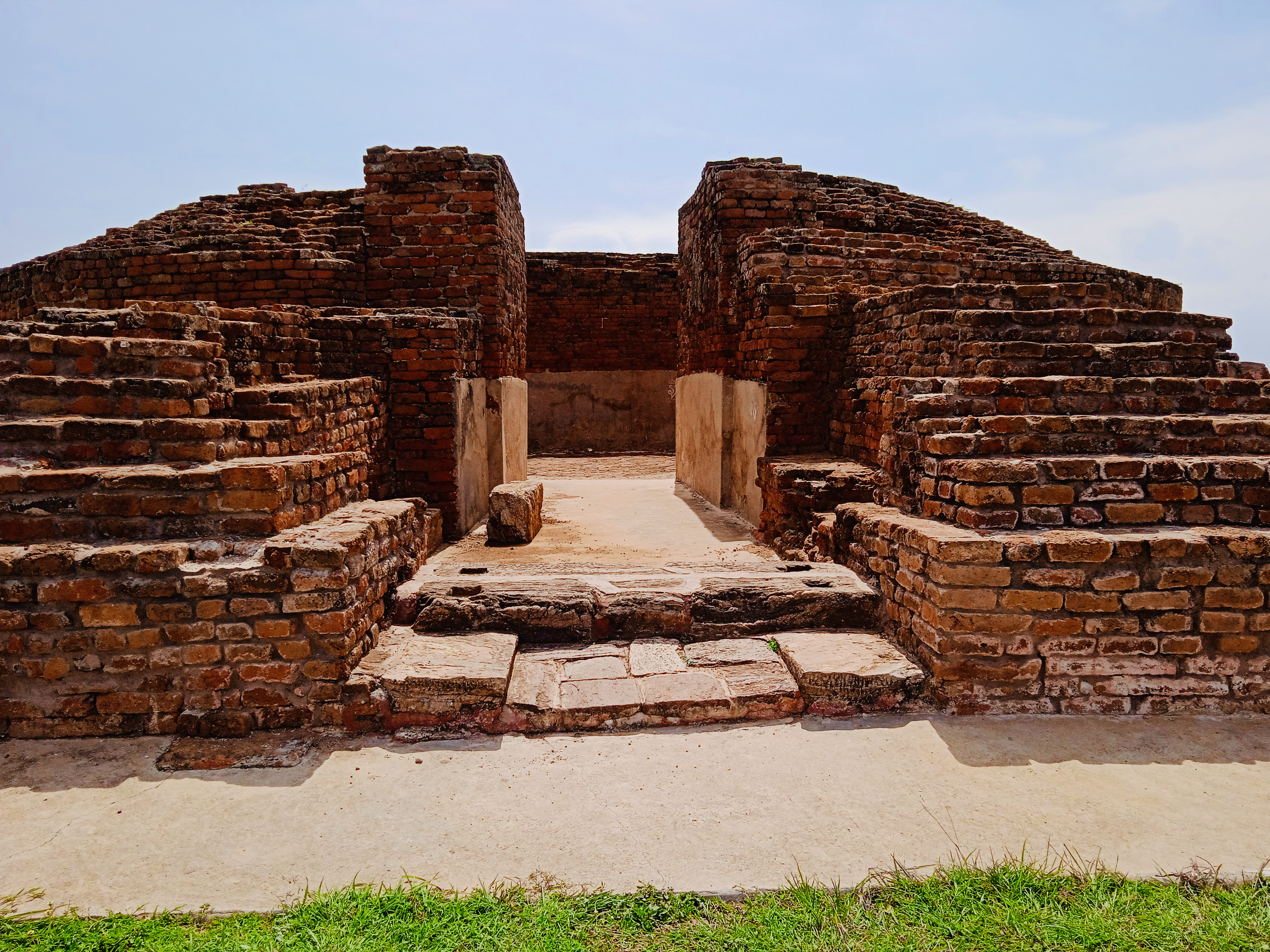
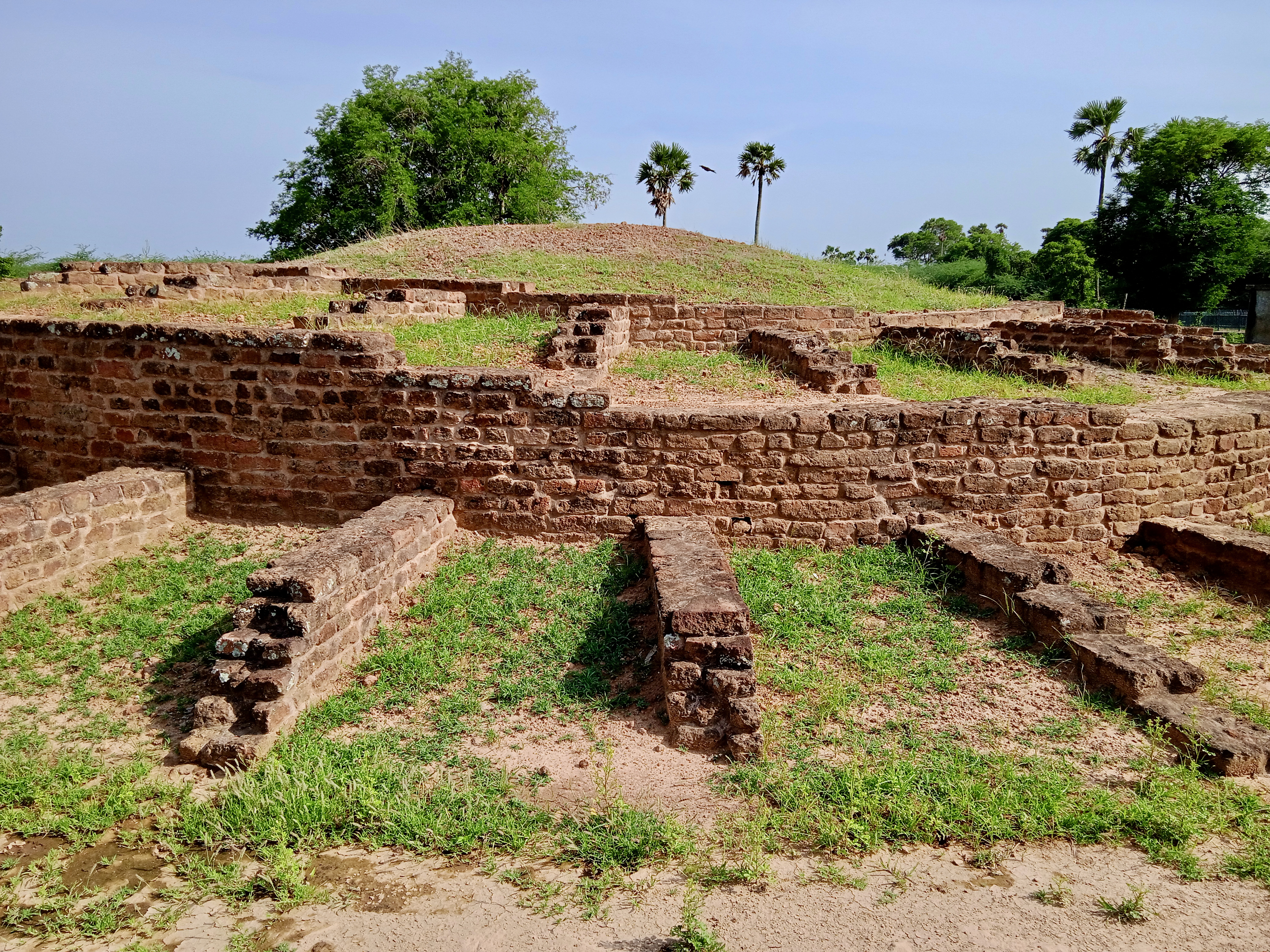
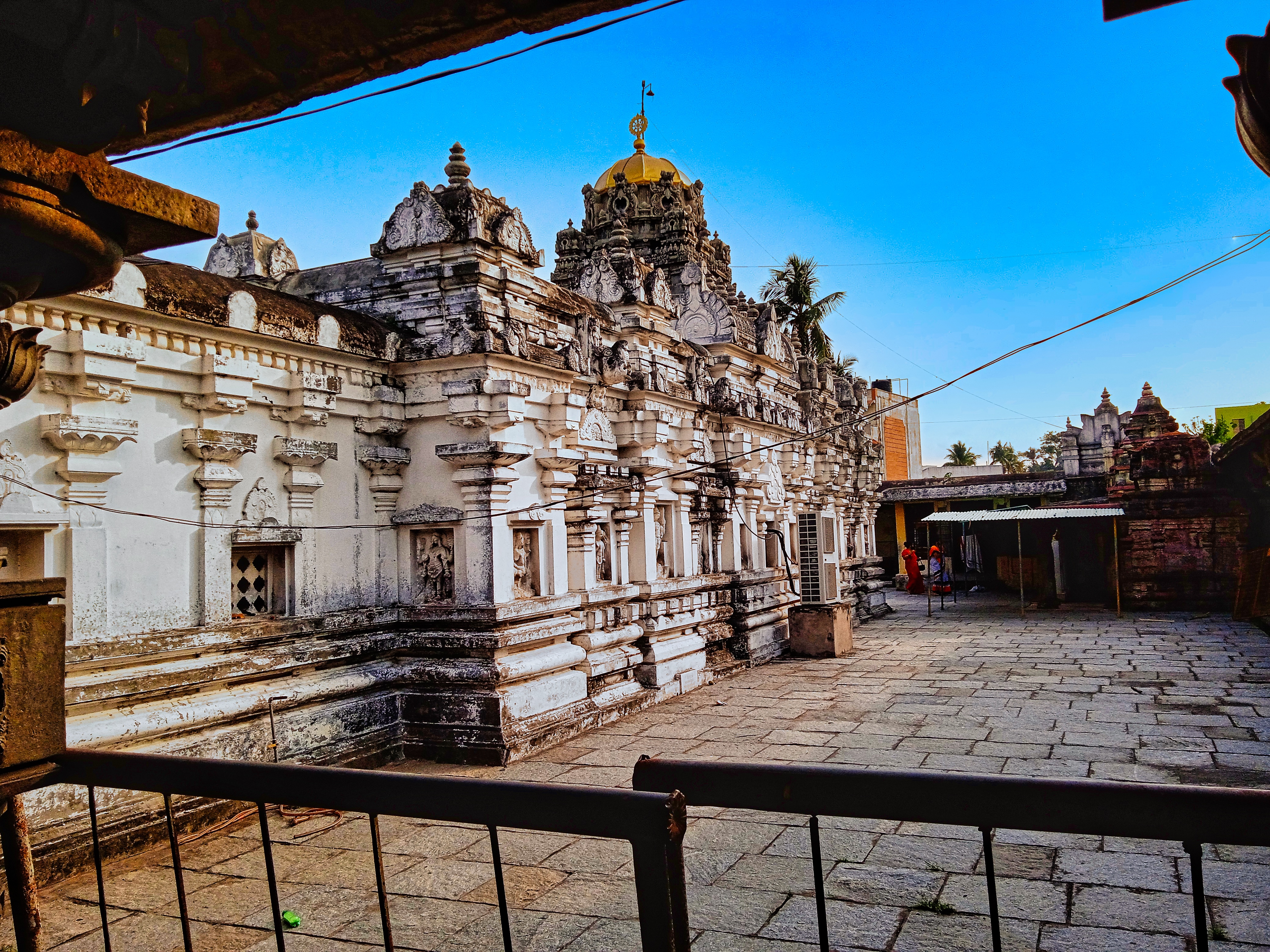
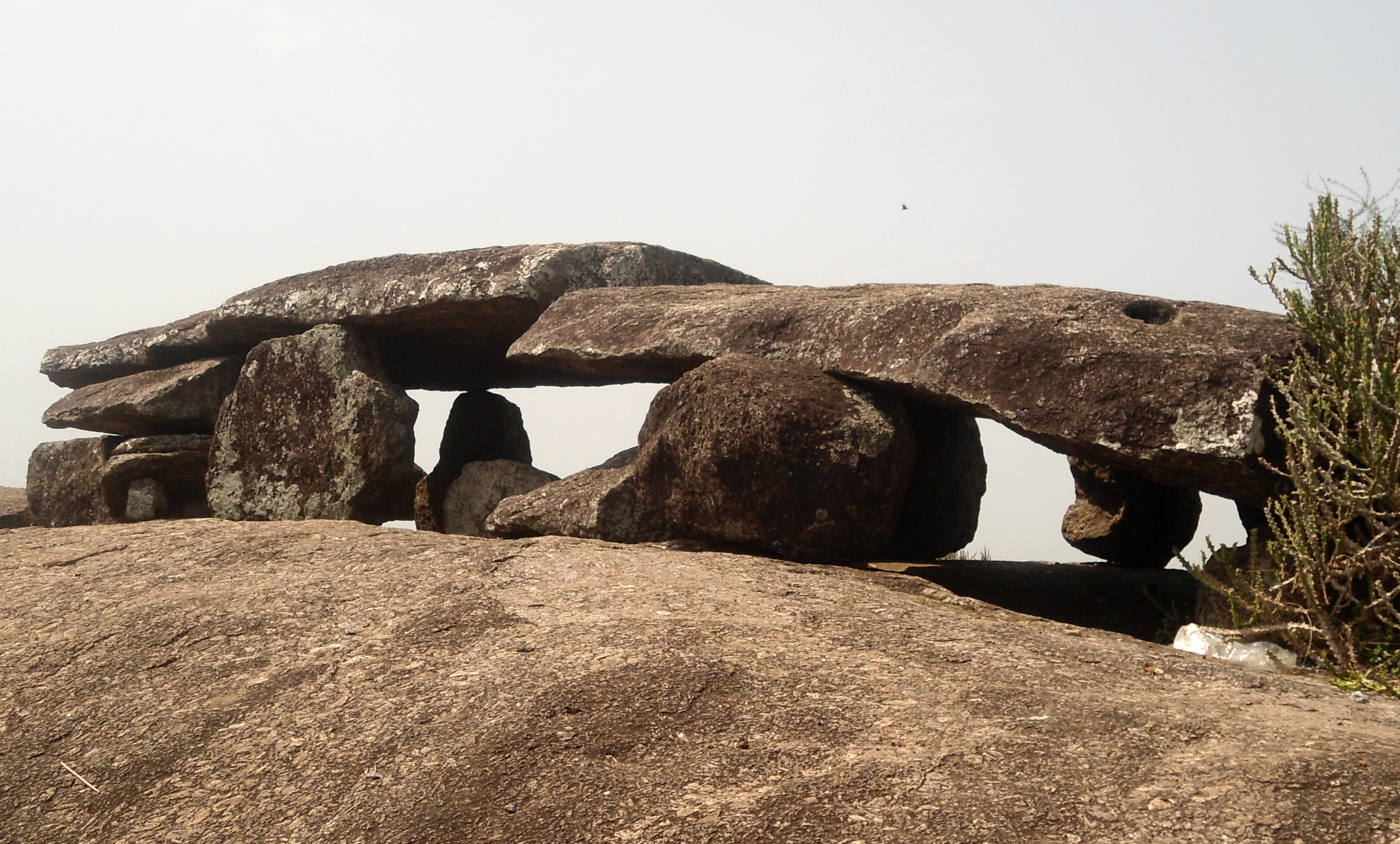
- Category: Srimukhalingam Temple at Mukhalingam, Ruined Stupa near Salihundam, Kurmanathaswamy temple, Srikurmam, Dolmens near Dannanapeta, Buddhist site at Kalingapatnam

- Location of Srikakulam district in Andhra Pradesh
- Interactive map of Srikakulam district
- Country: India
- State: Andhra Pradesh
- Region: Uttara Andhra
- Headquarters: Srikakulam
- Administrative Divisions: 3 Revenue divisions; 30 Mandalas; 1802 Villages (1701 inhabited, 101 uninhabited); 12 Towns (5 statutory, 7 census)

Government
  - Lok Sabha constituencies: Srikakulam, Vizianagaram
  - Assembly constituencies: 08

Area
  - Total: 4,591 km^{2} (1,773 sq mi)

Population (2011)
  - Total: 2,191,437
  - Density: 463/km^{2} (1,200/sq mi)
  - Rank: 6th
  - Urban: 373,746
  - Households: 681,330
  - Sex ratio: 1,015 (females per 1,000 males)

Languages
  - Official: Telugu

Literacy
  - Literates: 1495381
- Time zone: UTC+5:30 (IST)
- Postal Index Number: 532xxx
- Area codes: +91–8942
- ISO 3166 code: IN-AP
- Vehicle registration: AP–39 (from 30 January 2019)
- District LGD code: 519
- District abbreviation: SRK
- Website: srikakulam.ap.gov.in

Srikakulam district is a district in the Indian state of Andhra Pradesh, located in the Uttara Andhra region of the state, with its headquarters located at Srikakulam. It is one of the six districts located in the extreme northeastern direction of the state. It was formerly known as Chicacole, and was under Ganjam district till 1 April 1936, then merged under Vizagapatam district. Srikakulam district forms the core area of Kalinga where most of its historical capitals like Kalinganagari, Pithunda, and Dantapuram are located.

== Geography ==
Srikakulam district occupies an area of 4,591 square kilometres (1,773 sq mi), comparatively equivalent to Trinidad and Tobago. It is within the geographic coordinates of 18°-20’ and 19°-10’ N and 83°-50’ and 84°-50’ E. The district is skirted to a distance by Kandivalasagedda, Vamsadhara and Bahuda at certain stretches of their courses while a line of heights of the great Eastern Ghats run from the northeast. Vizianagaram district and Parvathipuram Manyam district flanks in the south and west while Odisha bounds it on the north and Bay of Bengal on the East. Srikakulam district can be divided into two main distinct natural divisions. A portion of Srikakulam district is plain terrain with intense agriculture and the other is rocky and hilly terrain covered with forests. Some of the Mahendragiri Hills covers Srikakulam district. Most of the forest area of the plain terrain has been damaged by intense agriculture. Kotthuru, Hiramandalam, Pathapatnam, Kalingadal reservoir and some other areas are still covered with dense forests. Srikakulam is 100 km (62 mi) north of Visakhapatnam. It has a population of 2,703,114 of which 10.98% is urban as of 2001. Srikakulam district has the longest coastline (about 193 km (120 mi)) in the state of Andhra Pradesh.

Major rivers flowing through the district are River Nagavali, River Vamsadhara, Mahendratanaya, Champavati, Bahuda, Kumbhikota Gedda, Suvarnamukhi, Vegavati, Gomukhi. The Nagavali and Vamsadhara are the major rivers in Srikakulam district. These two river basins together constitute about 5% of the area. The Mahendratanaya and Bahuda rivers are two minor river basins in the district. Others are Benjigedda, Peddagedda, Kandivalasa gedda. Major irrigation projects on these rivers — Vamsadhara Project, Narayanapuram Anicut, Thotapalli Regulator — and some medium projects at Pydigam Project, Onigadda provide a total ayacut of 69,373 acres (280.74 km^{2}).

== History ==
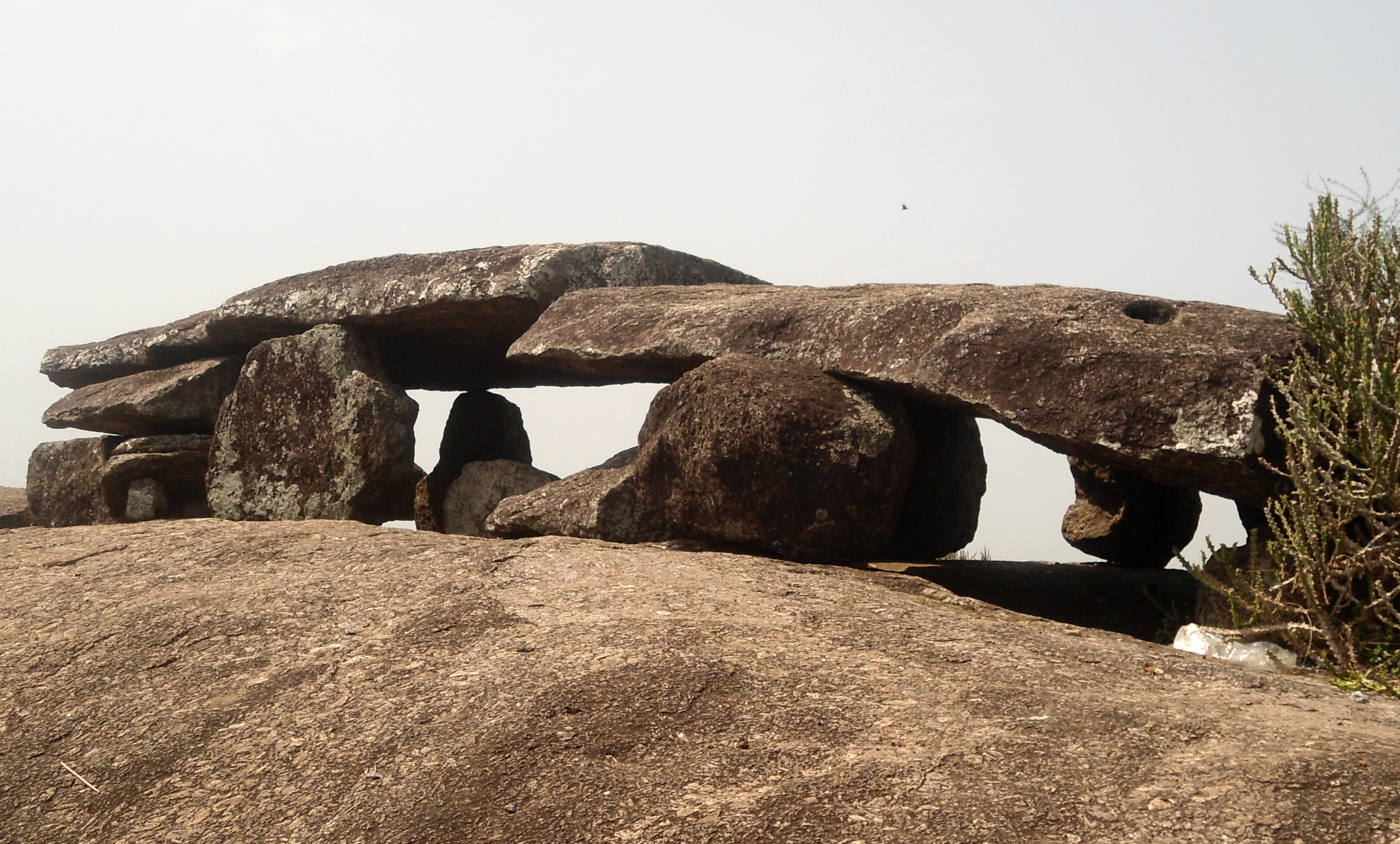
Iron Age megalithic Dolmen at Dannanapeta near Amudalavalasa

=== Prehistory ===
Evidence of early historic man and his activities during the Stone Age and Iron Age have been discovered at Sangamayya Konda and Dannanapeta. The speciality of Dannanapeta Iron Age megalithic site is a large single capstone as a dolmen with 36 ft in length and 14 ft in width and 2 ft thickness. Sailada Hills consists of 36 upright rocks and natural caves used for habitation by Iron Age man in Amudalavalasa mandal of the district.

=== Early history ===
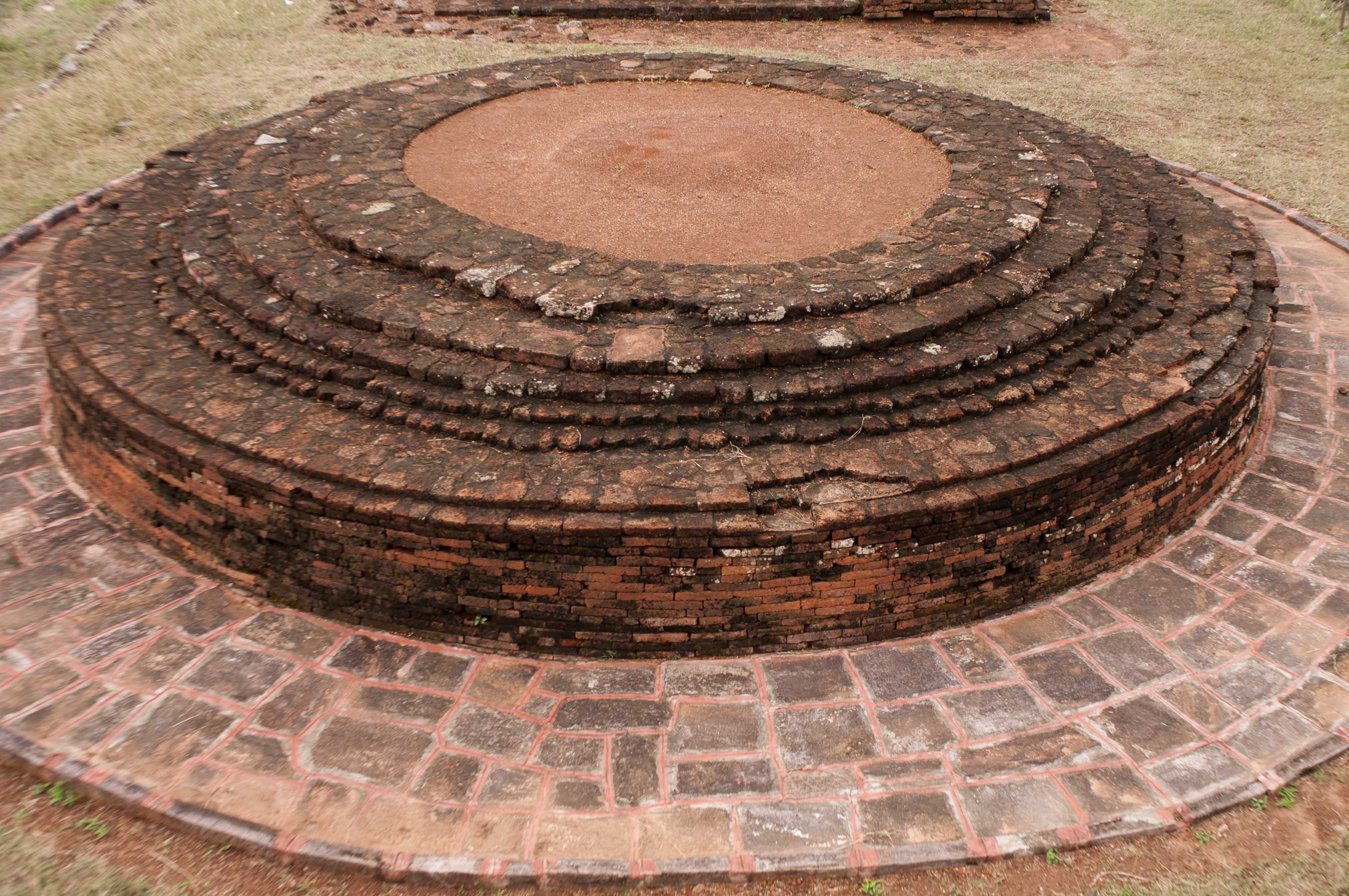
Salihundam Historic Buddhist Remains Site

Evidences of Jain monuments and Buddhist remnants were discovered near Sangamayya Konda. Jain rock beds were discovered at Dannanapeta near Amudalavalasa in the district. Salihundam is a famous Buddhist remnants site on the south bank of River Vamsadhara 5 kilometres west of Kalingapatnam and 18 kilometres from Srikakulam town.

Srikakulam was historically part of the region of Kalinga, conquered by Ashoka in the 3rd century. Kalinga regained prominence under Kharavela. The region appears to have been dominated by the Sathavahanas in the 3rd century, as at Salihundam many Sathavahana coins have been found. Samudra Gupta's great conquests in Kalinga spurred the rise of new families called the Matharas who ruled from Singupura called themselves Kalingapathis. In the 6th and 7th centuries Kalinga was dominated by the Chalukyas of Badami and their later offshoots the Eastern Chalukyas of Vengi.

=== Gangas and Gajapatis ===
Later in the district came the first grants from kings who call themselves the Ganga family, who called themselves Kalingapatis and who ruled from Kalinganagara, which has been identified with Mukhalingam which still contains many ancient and elaborate temples. They were worshippers of Shiva at a temple on Mahendragiri in present Gajapati district. It is estimated that by the end of the 9th century, these Gangas were followed by another line of the same name who also ruled from Kalinganagara, called the Eastern Ganga dynasty. One of these rulers, Rajaraja Devendravarman, helped the Vengi Chalukyas beat back the Cholas in the late 11th century. His son Anantavarman Chodaganga presided over the zenith of Eastern Ganga power. Under his rule, he took over the rule of Vengi and fought all along the eastern coast from the Ganga to the Godavari. He also began the building of the Jagannath Temple at Puri and shifted his capital from Kalinganagara to Cuttack, which remained the capital of the Gangas from then on.

The Eastern Gangas continued to rule over the present district, but their hold in the region began to fail. While they resisted invasions from Muslim powers from Bengal and Delhi, they gradually lost hold over the southern part of Kalinga. The Reddys of Reddi Kingdom began to penetrate the region slowly, as they also expanded up to Cuttack earlier under Katya Vema Reddy and Kumaragiri Reddy and held titles like Katakachurakara i.e;the plundrer of Cuttack, However in 1434, on the death of Ganga king Bhanu Deva IV, his minister seized the throne under the title Pratapa Kapileshwara, founding the Gajapati Dynasty. He fought many wars against both the Hindu Vijayanagara Empire, who ruled the territory south of Kalinga, as well as the Muslim Bahmani Sultanate of the Deccan, and expanded his empire at the expense of both till it stretched from the Ganga to the Krishna. His grandson Prataparudra lost some territory to Krishnadevaraya of Vijayanagara, who conquered up to Simhachalam. During this time however, local ruling families had significant autonomy.

At the end of the 15th century, the Bahmani Sultanate broke up into five different sultanates, of whom the closest to Srikakulam was the Qutub Shahis of Golconda, who was able to take all the territory south of the Godavari. In 1571, Ibrahim Qutub Shah took advantage of the chaos after the dissolution of the Gajapatis to conquer the territory from the Godavari to Ichchapuram. For the next 180 years, Srikakulam was under Muslim rule, although the Hindu ruling families still retained significant autonomy.

=== Muslim rule ===
The principal seat of government in Kalinga under Muslim rule was Srikakulam, where the Faujdar resided, while a Naib was at Ichchapuram. In 1641, Sher Mohammad Khan was sent by Abdullah Qutub Shah to rule over the territory north of the Godavari and built a mosque in Srikakulam. In 1687, Aurangzeb conquered the entire Qutub Shahi kingdom and places the territories north of the Godavari under the Subedar of the Deccan, under whom were various governors of the Sarkars. Srikakulam became part of the Sarkar of Chicacole. In 1724, the Subedar of the Deccan, Nizam-ul-Mulk, made himself independent and appointed the later Nawab of the Carnatic, Anwaruddin Khan, as the first Faujdar. However the Nizam died in 1748 and the French and English took opposite sides in the resulting succession dispute. A French protege, Salabat Jung, secured the post, and ceded the region included Srikakulam to the French in 1750. However, the current Faujdar, Jafar Ali, refused to step down and persuaded Gajapati Vijayarama Raju, the most powerful local ruler, to oppose the arrival of the French. However the French then promised to lease him the Rajahmundry and Srikakulam Sarkars at a high discount. Jafar Ali then called for the help of the Marathas of Nagpur, who crossed the Eastern Ghats, plundered Bheemunipatnam and the Dutch factory, defeated Vijayarama Raju and the French and then returned home with lots of booty. Abandoned by all, Jafar Ali submitted.

=== Colonial rule ===
In 1754, the French general Bussy appointed Ibrahim Khan as Faujdar of Srikakulam. However relations with Hyderabad turned tense and Ibrahim Khan refused to pay tribute, with only Vijayarama Raju continuing to pay tribute. Bussy then marched into Srikakulam to restore his authority, causing Ibrahim Khan to flee. He was then persuaded by Vijayarama Raju to attack his rival, the ruler of Bobbili, which he then did. The brutal siege resulted in the death of its ruler, Ranga Rao and most of the defenders and their families, and the capitulation of his young son to the French. Vijayarama Raju was then assassinated by revenge-seeking soldiers of Ranga Rao. His successor Ananda Raju, was disattisfied with the French conduct after his father's death and asked the English to help him expel the French. After several battles, the English took the Northern Circars from the French and brought it back to the rule of Hyderabad, nominally. in 1765, the Mughal Emperor granted a firman to the British East India Company giving them the Northern Circars, however the Nizam did not like this. in 1766 a treaty was concluded where the English would pay 9 lakhs annually to the Nizam for the territory, a tribute which was reduced and eventually dropped.

The East India Company had to intimidate the various Zamindars of the region to pay tribute, which they eventually did. However at the first opportunity, they sought to throw off Company rule, like the Raja of Parlakhemundi who sought the aid of the Marathas in Cuttack. In 1788, the British enacted a Permanent Settlement in the region, which they called the Ichchapur District. In 1789, a famine hit the district for which the Company did very little.

The Chicacole division underwent significant administrative and socio-economic shifts between 1767 and 1802, concluding with its incorporation into the Ganjam district. Originally organized as the third division of the Vizagapatam district, its jurisdiction stretched from Chinna Pantulu Daba in the south to Kasibugga in the north, including the Kasimkota region. Following the British acquisition of the Northern Circars, the district was leased for two consecutive ten-year terms (1767–1787) to Sitaram Raju, brother of the Raja of Vizianagaram.

Sitaram Raju’s administration was characterized by systemic exploitation and was ultimately deemed detrimental to the British East India Company’s interests. His tenure saw the widespread practice of "rack-renting," where renters seized disproportionate shares of agricultural produce, leaving the ryots (peasantry) with minimal subsistence. Raju further disrupted social structures by dispossessing Brahmins of their traditional Agraharam (charity) lands, offering Haveli villages as inadequate compensation. This oppressive environment triggered a mass exodus of manufacturers and artisans, who emigrated to neighboring regions to escape the predatory fiscal policies. The Company then deposed Sitarama Raju and replaced him with a Resident.

In 1802, all the Zamindars were made into private landholders who had to pay regular installments and would lose their lands for a single missed payment. The Zamindars opposed this settlement enough that the Collector had to be given the power for Martial Law. Before this time, it was part of the Vizagapatnam District. However in 1802, the district was made into part of the Ganjam District under a District Collector.

The people of Uttarandhra were hit by famine in 1865. Many participated in the freedom struggle against British rule, sending delegates to the Indian National Congress. District Associations under Visakhapatnam and Ganjam were begun. The people participated in all the national movements against colonial rule including the Salt March. In 1935, the Odia-speaking parts of Ganjam district were separated and given to the new Orissa province, while the Telugu parts were given to Vizagapatnam district. In 1942, responding to the violent repression of the Quit India Movement, the people attacked railways and telegraph lines.

=== Post Independence ===
Srikakulam District was carved out in 1950 by bifurcating it from Visakhapatnam District. It remained unaffected in its territorial jurisdiction for some time. But in November 1969 the district lost 63 villages from Saluru Taluk and 44 villages from Bobbili Taluk on account of their transfer to the then newly constituted Gajapathinagaram Taluk of Visakhapatnam District.

In May 1979, the district underwent major territorial changes with the formation of a new district with headquarters at Vizianagaram which involved transfer of Salur, Bobbili, Parvathipuram and Cheepurupalli Taluks to the new district. Srikakulam's culture is a blend of traditional festivals, food, music and theatres.

In October-November 2026, Srikakulam district was affected by severe flooding as a result of Cyclone Arnab.

== Demographics ==
According to the 2011 census Srikakulam district has a population of 2,703,114, roughly equal to the nation of Kuwait or the US state of Nevada. This gives it a ranking of 147th in India (out of a total of 640). The district has a population density of 462 inhabitants per square kilometre (1,200/sq mi). Its population growth rate over the decade 2001–2011 was 6.38%. Srikakulam has a sex ratio of 1014 females for every 1000 males, and a literacy rate of 62.3%.

Religions in Srikakulam district (2011)
Religion	Percent
Hinduism	98.79%
Christianity	0.54%
Other or not stated	0.67%

After reorganization the district had a population of 21,91,437, with a sex ratio of 1014 females to every 1000 males. 373,746 (17.05%) lives in urban areas. Scheduled Castes and Scheduled Tribes made up 1,85,890 (8.48%) and 94,371 (4.31%) of the population respectively.

Languages of Srikakulam district (2011)
1. Telugu (92.3%)
2. Odia (6.18%)
3. Saora (0.92%)
4. Others (0.56%)

At the time of the 2011 census, 92.34% of the population spoke Telugu, 6.18% Odia and 0.92% Sora as their first language.

=== Household indicators ===
According to 2007–08, International Institute for Population Sciences, 86.9% had access to electricity, 70.4% had drinking water, 18.5% toilet facilities, and 47.2% lived in a pucca (permanent) home. 31.5% of girls wed before the legal age of 18 and 90.1% of interviewees carried a BPL card.

=== Historical population ===
Historical population
Year	Pop.	±% p.a.
1901	1,060,467	—
1911	1,101,199	+0.38%
1921	1,123,461	+0.20%
1931	1,222,767	+0.85%
1941	1,333,341	+0.87%
1951	1,405,792	+0.53%
1961	1,555,369	+1.02%
1971	1,769,968	+1.30%
1981	1,959,352	+1.02%
1991	2,321,126	+1.71%
2001	2,537,593	+0.90%
2011	2,703,114	+0.63%

== Politics ==
There are two parliamentary constituencies and 8 assembly constituencies in Srikakulam district. The parliamentary constituencies are Srikakulam (Lok Sabha constituency) and Vizianagaram (Lok Sabha constituency).

The seven assembly segments of Srikakulam Lok Sabha and one Assembly segment of Vijayanagaram Lok Sabha constituency.

Constituency number	Name	Reserved for (SC/ST/None)	Lok Sabha constituency
1	Ichchapuram	None	Srikakulam
2	Palasa	None	Srikakulam
3	Tekkali	None	Srikakulam
4	Pathapatnam	None	Srikakulam
5	Srikakulam	None	Srikakulam
6	Amadalavalasa	None	Srikakulam
7	Narasannapeta	None	Srikakulam
8	Etcherla	None	Vizianagaram

== Administrative divisions ==
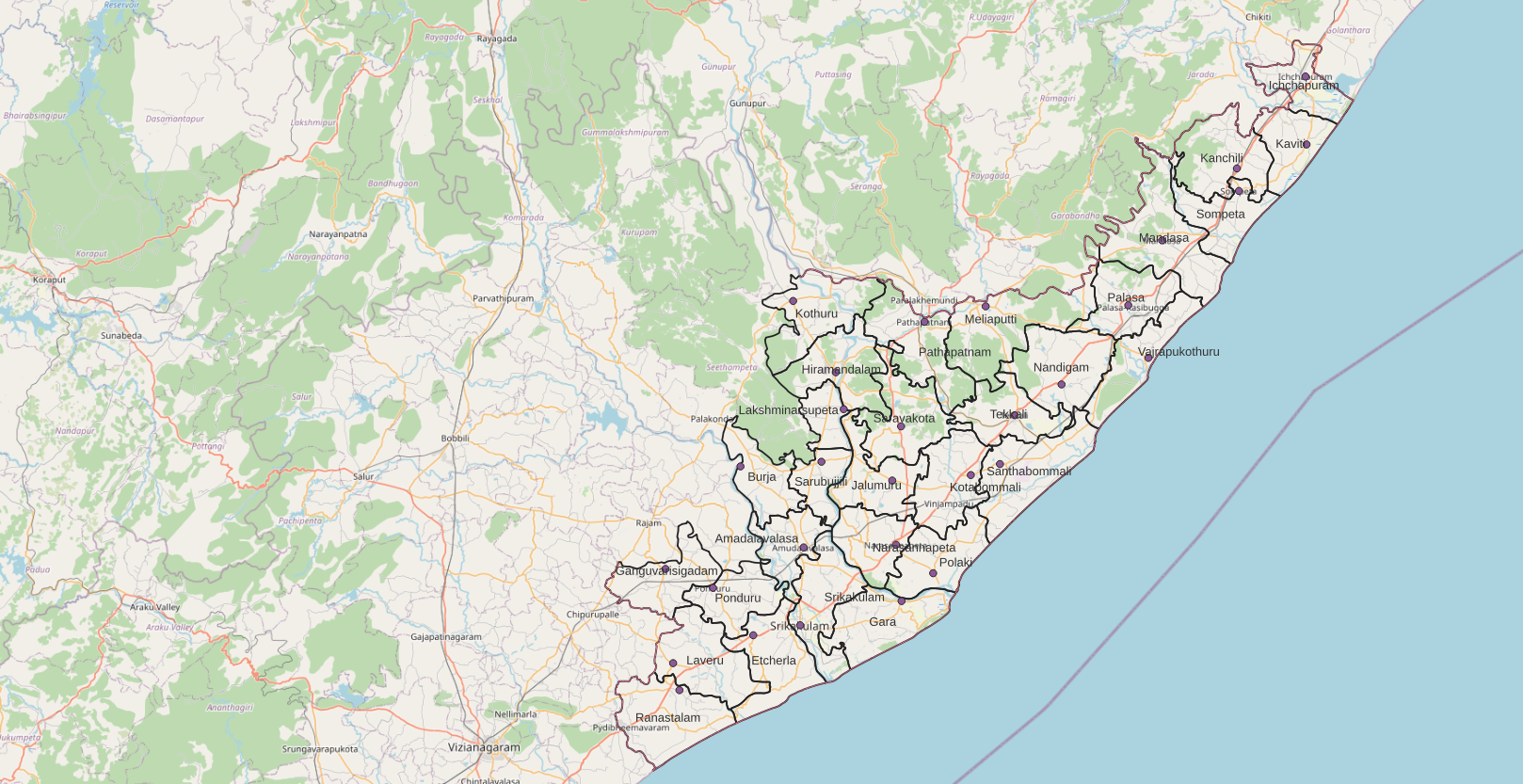
Satellite view of Srikakulam district

The district is divided into 3 revenue divisions: Palasa, Srikakulam and Tekkali, which are further subdivided into a total of 30 mandals, each headed by a sub-collector.

=== Mandals ===
The list of 30 mandals in Srikakulam district, divided into 3 revenue divisions, is given below.

1. Palasa revenue division
  1. Ichchapuram
  2. Kaviti
  3. Sompeta
  4. Kanchili
  5. Palasa
  6. Mandasa
  7. Vajrapukotturu
2. Srikakulam revenue division
  1. Srikakulam
  2. Gara
  3. Amadalavalasa
  4. Ponduru
  5. Sarubujjili
  6. Burja
  7. Narasannapeta
  8. Polaki
  9. Etcherla
  10. Laveru mandalLaveru
  11. Ranastalam
  12. Ganguvarisigadam
  13. Jalumuru
3. Tekkali revenue division
  1. Tekkali
  2. Santha Bommali
  3. Kotabommali
  4. Pathapatnam
  5. Meliaputti
  6. Nandigama
  7. Saravakota
  8. Kothuru
  9. Hiramandalam
  10. Lakshminarasupeta

=== Cities and towns ===
There are one municipal corporation and three municipalities. The municipal corporation in the district is Srikakulam and three municipalities in the district are Amadalavalasa, Ichchapuram, Palasa-Kasibugga. The six census towns are Balaga, Hiramandalam, Narasannapeta, Ponduru, Sompeta, Tekkali.

Largest cities or towns in Srikakulam District as per 2011 census
Town/City	type	Division	Population
Srikakulam	Municipal Corporation	Srikakulam Division	125,953
Palasa	Municipality Grade - 2	Palasa Division	57,507
Amudalavalasa	Municipality Grade - 2	Srikakulam Division	39,799
Ichchapuram	Municipality Grade - 3	Palasa Division	36,478
Tekkali	Census town	Tekkali Division	28,637
Narasannapeta	Census town	Srikakulam Division	26,280
Sompeta	Census town	Palasa Division	18,778
Pathapatnam	Census town	Tekkali Division	15,954

=== Historical mandal formation ===
In 1978, the number of talukas in Srikakulam district was increased from 14 to 19. Later in 1985, 19 Talukas were divided into 60 mandals, out of which 14 talukas were in Srikakulam further bifurcated into 38 Mandals.

S.No.	Erstwhile Talukas in 1971	Newly Formed Talukas in 1978	Newly Formed Mandals in 1985
1	Srikakulam	Srikakulam	Srikakulam, Gara,
1	Srikakulam	Amadalavalasa	Amadalavalasa, Burja [part], Sarubujjili,
2	Palakonda	Palakonda	Palakonda, Vanagara, Burja [part], Seethampeta,
2	Palakonda	Rajam	Veeraghattam, Regidi, Rajam, Santhakaviti,
3	Pathapatnam	Pathapatnam	Pathapatnam, Kothuru [part], Hiramandalam[part], Saravakota, Meliaputti, Tekkali [part],
3	Pathapatnam	Hiramandalam	Hiramandalam[part], Bhamini, Kothuru [part], Lakshminarsupeta
4	Narasannapet	Narasannapet	Narasannapet, Polaki [part],
4	Narasannapet	Kotabommali	Kotabommali [part], Polaki [part], Jalumuru, Santhabommali [part],
5	Tekkali	Tekkali	Tekkali [part], Kotabommali [part], Santhabommali [part], Nandigam [part], Varjapukothuru [part]
5	Tekkali	Palasa	Palasa, Nandigam [part], Varjapukothuru [part],
6	Sompeta	Sompeta	Sompeta, mandasa,
7	Ichchapuram	Ichchapuram	Ichchapuram, Kaviti,
8	Cheepurupalle	Ranasthalam	Ranasthalam, Laveru,
8	Cheepurupalle	Ponduru	Ganguvari sigadam, Pondhuru, Etcherla,
8	Cheepurupalle	***Cheepurupalle [New Vizianagaram]	Vizianagaram District
9	Bobbili	***Bobbili [New Vizianagaram]	Vizianagaram District
10	Salur	***Salur [New Vizianagaram]	Vizianagaram District
11	Parvathipuram	***Parvathipuram [New Vizianagaram]	Vizianagaram District

== Economy ==
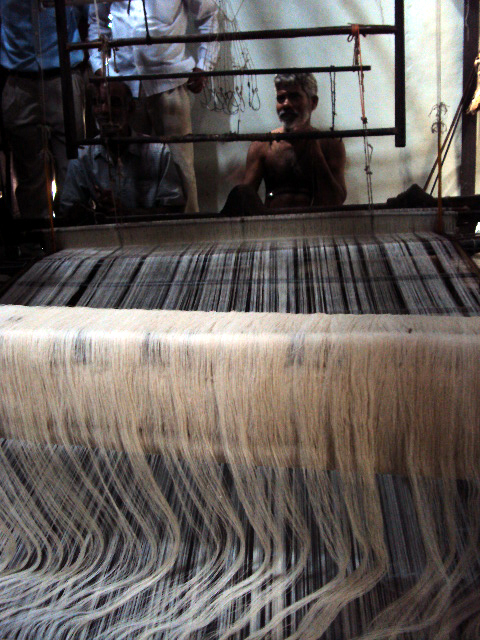
Khadi weaving at Ponduru, Srikakulam district

The gross district domestic product (GDDP) of the district is ₹19,942 crore (US$2.1 billion) and it contributes 3.8% to the gross state domestic product (GSDP). While the per capita income at current prices was ₹92,090 (US$980). The primary, secondary and tertiary sectors of the district contribute ₹4,855 crore (US$520 million), ₹4,114 crore (US$440 million) and ₹10,973 crore (US$1.2 billion) respectively.

Tribal communities such as the Saora and Jatapus still practise the traditional podu system of cultivation.

Dr. Reddy's Laboratories, a major pharmaceutical company, is at Pydibhimavaram.

=== Important commodities produced / manufactured in the district ===
Following are the towns & villages with respective commodities produced across the district.

S#	Town	Commodities
1	Srikakulam	Jute, Bricks, Iron Articles
2	Palasa	Cashew Nuts, Coir Ropes, Sugar
3	Ichchapuram	Coir Ropes, Bricks, Stone Carving
4	Sompeta	Cashew Nuts, Baskets
5	Hiramandalam	Groundnut Oil
6	Tekkali	Aluminium Moulding
7	Amadalavalasa	Sugar
8	Narasannapeta	Jaggery
9	Balaga	Jute, Bricks
10	Ponduru	Textiles, Ground Nut

== Transport ==
The total road length of state highways in the district is 959 km (596 mi). Andhra Pradesh State Road Transport Corporation runs bus services to all the major cities and towns of the state from the district. Major railway stations in the district include Amudalavalasa, Srikakulam Road railway station, Palasa railway station ( major station) Naupada, Ichchapuram and Sompeta etc.

== Education ==
The primary and secondary school education is imparted by government, aided and private schools, under the School Education Department of the state. As per the school information report for the academic year 2015–16, there are 3,875 schools. They include, 55 government, 2,833 mandal and zilla parishads, 1 residential, 573 private, 14 model, 32 Kasturba Gandhi Balika Vidyalaya (KGBV), 85 municipal and 282 other types of schools. The number of students enrolled in primary, upper primary and high schools of the district is 371,472.

The only university in the district is Dr. B.R. Ambedkar University, Srikakulam and medical colleges are Rajiv Gandhi Institute of Medical Sciences in Srikakulam town, GEMS—Great Eastern Medical Speciality and Hospital in Ragolu village.

== Culture ==
The district is renowned for the brassware products namely, Budithi Bell and Brass Craft, which are made at Budithi village. These are registered as geographic indication from Andhra Pradesh.

Sri Suryanarayana Swamy Temple at Arasavelli, and Sri Kurmam Temple at Sri Kurmam are some of the famous historical temples in the district.

The district has many people from fields like film industry, music, art and architecture etc. Among the notable people are Vaddadi Papaiah, J. V. Somayajulu, Gidugu Venkata Ramamoorty, Sarat babu, LV Revanth(Indian idol), Rao Ramesh, Rao gopala Rao, Sai kumar, Pingali Nagendrarao, and Kalipatnam Ramarao.

== Sports ==
Kodi Rammurthy Naidu (body builder), Karnam Malleswari (Olympic medalist), Pujari Sailaja in weight lifting are famous people from the district.

== Notable people ==
- Sarath Babu, actor
- Gouthu Latchanna, freedom fighter and politician
- Karnam Malleswari, Indian weightlifter
- Kinjarapu Yerran Naidu, Member of Parliament and Central Minister
- Kodi Rammurthy Naidu, Indian bodybuilder
- Grandhi Mallikarjuna Rao, industrialist
- T. Trivikrama Rao, producer
