= Harishchandrapuram Assembly constituency =

Constituency of the Andhra Pradesh legislative assembly, India

Coordinates: 16.79°N 80.94°E

Harishchandrapuram
- Former constituency for the Andhra Pradesh Legislative Assembly

Constituency details
- Country: India
- Region: South India
- State: Andhra Pradesh
- District: Srikakulam
- Established: 1967
- Abolished: 2008

Harishchandrapuram Assembly constituency was a constituency of the Andhra Pradesh Legislative Assembly, India until 2008 in Srikakulam district.

== Overview ==
It was a part of Srikakulam Lok Sabha constituency along with another six Andhra Pradesh Legislative Assembly segments, namely, Palasa, Tekkali, Pathapatnam, Srikakulam, Amadalavalasa and Narasannapeta.

== Members of Legislative Assembly ==
Year	Member	Political party
1967	Krishna Murthy Kinjarapu	Swatantra Party
1972	Kannipally Appla Narasimha Bhuktha	Indian National Congress
1978	Kannipally Appla Narasimha Bhuktha	Indian National Congress
1983	Kinjarapu Yerran Naidu	Telugu Desam Party
1985	Kinjarapu Yerran Naidu	Telugu Desam Party
1989	Kinjarapu Yerran Naidu	Independent
1994	Kinjarapu Yerran Naidu	Telugu Desam Party
1996	Kinjarapu Atchannaidu	Telugu Desam Party
1999	Kinjarapu Atchannaidu	Telugu Desam Party
2004	Kinjarapu Atchannaidu	Telugu Desam Party

== Election results ==
=== 2004 ===
2004 Andhra Pradesh Legislative Assembly election: Harishchandrapuram
Party	Candidate	Votes	%	±%
TDP	Kinjarapu Atchannaidu			
NOTA	None of the Above			
Majority				
Turnout				
TDP hold		Swing		

== See also ==
- List of constituencies of Andhra Pradesh Legislative Assembly
