= Kinjarapu =

Kinjarapu is a Telugu surname and may refer to:

- Kinjarapu Atchannaidu, Indian politician
- Ram Mohan Naidu Kinjarapu (born 1987), Indian politician
- Kinjarapu Yerran Naidu (1957–2012), Indian politician
