= Boddepalli Satyavathi =

Indian politician

Boddepalli Satyavathi (born 1953) is an Indian politician from Andhra Pradesh. She is a former two time member of the Andhra Pradesh Legislative Assembly from Amadalavalasa Assembly constituency in Srikakulam district. She was last elected in the 2009 Andhra Pradesh Legislative Assembly election representing the Indian National Congress.

== Early life and education ==
Satyavathi is from Amadalavalasa, Srikakulam district, Andhra Pradesh. She was married to late B Chitti Babu. She completed her MA at Andhra University, Visakhapatnam in 1987. She is the daughter in law of later Congress leader, Boddepalli Raja Gopala Rao who was an MP from Srikakulam constituency for six times. She was facilitated by Andhra Pradesh speaker Thammineni Seetharam during the state government organised centenary celebrations of Gopala Rao in Srikakulam.

== Career ==
Satyavathi was first elected as an MLA in the Amadalavalasa Assembly constituency representing the Indian National Congress in the 2004 Andhra Pradesh Legislative Assembly election. She polled 46,300 votes and defeated her nearest rival, Thammineni Seetharam of the Telugu Desam Party, by a margin of 3,686 votes. She retained the seat for the Congress Party in the 2009 Andhra Pradesh Legislative Assembly election polling 48,128 votes and defeating her closest opponent, Seetharam who contested this time as a Praja Rajyam Party candidate, by a margin of 16,209 votes. In 2012, she was elected as an MP. She lost the 2014 Assembly election due to the weakening of the Congress Party after the bifurcation of the state in 2014.
