= Kantragada =

Village in India

Kantragada is a village in Palasa mandal, Srikakulam district in the state of Andhra Pradesh, India. It is located 1.5 km from the state Orissa. The village was established on Varahalagadda Stream in the mid-19th century during the British colonial period when people migrated from nearby village Goppili. Kantragada was part of the Tharlakota kingdom under Kalingas.

== Geography ==
The geographical co-ordinates are 18°82'57.84 North and 84°36' 49.25 East with an altitude of 40 m (130 ft). The Eastern Ghats pass through the village. The foothills of Eastern Ghats like Ghojarai and Bhurujol are very near by. The village is well connected to towns including Palasa (10 km) towards East and Mandasa (14 km) towards North, Garabandha (11 km) towards West and Paralakhemundi (34 km) towards Southwest.

== Transport ==
National Highway 16, a part of Golden Quadrilateral highway network, is 9 km from the village. The nearest railway station is Palasa railway station having a distance of 12 km. The nearest airport is Alluri Sitarama Raju International Airport at a distance of 200 km and Biju Patnaik International Airport is 240 km away.

== Administration and politics ==
Kantragada is a part of Rentikota Panchayat and Palasa mandal. Kantragada official language is Telugu. The village comes under Palasa (Assembly constituency) in Andhra Pradesh Legislative Assembly. Kantragada pincode is 532221 and STD code 08945.

== Places of interest ==
The popular Gandahati waterfall is located in Gajapati District of Odisha is just 17 km away. The historical Mahendragiri hills were located around 33 km from the village. Nearest beach is Akkupalli is located at a distance of 23 km.
