= Kinjarapu Ram Mohan Naidu =

Indian politician (born 1987)

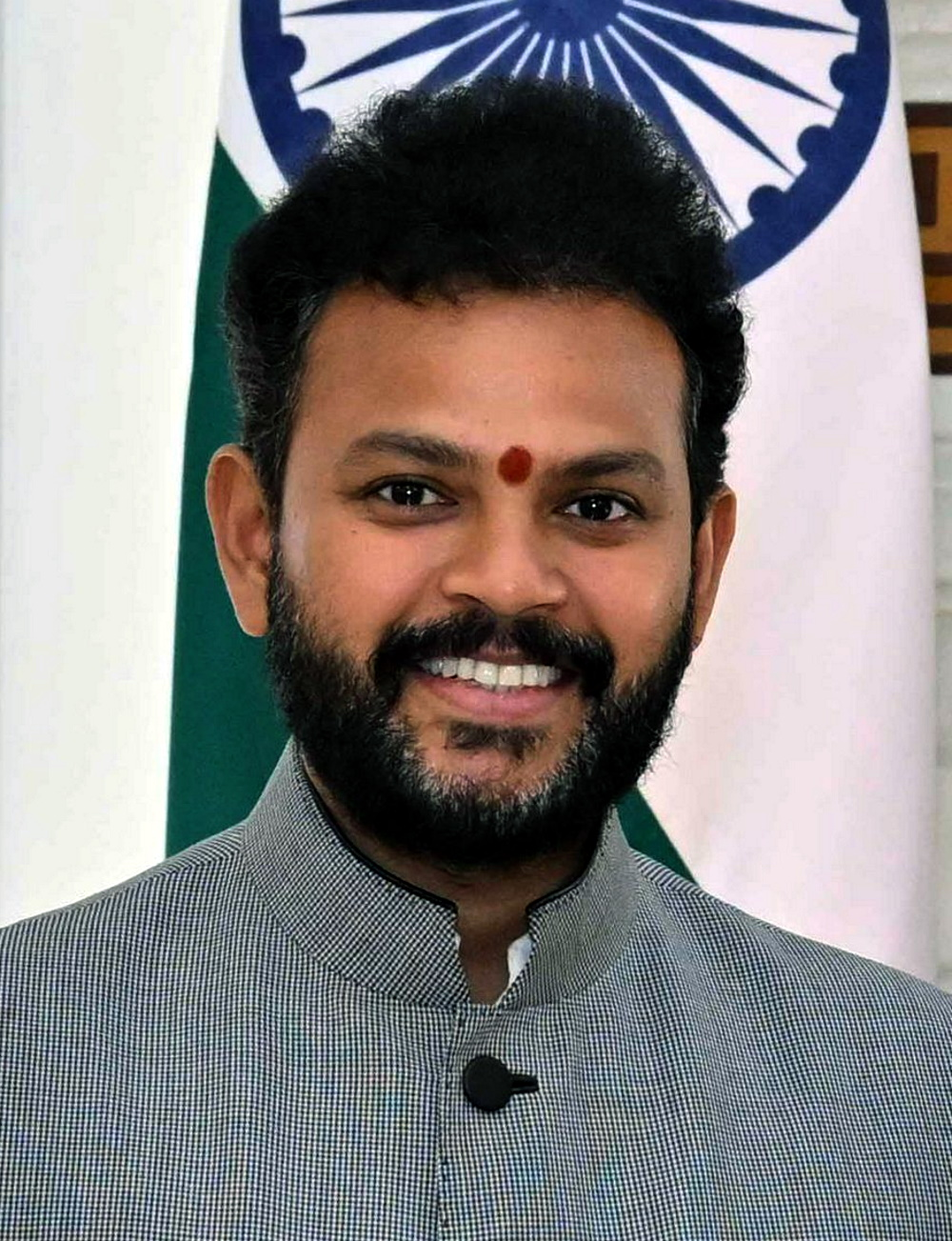
- Official portrait, 2025

33rd Union Minister of Civil Aviation
- Incumbent
- Assumed office 9 June 2024
- President: Droupadi Murmu
- Prime Minister: Narendra Modi
- Preceded by: Jyotiraditya Scindia

National General Secretary of Telugu Desam Party
- Incumbent
- Assumed office 2017 Serving with Nara Lokesh
- National President: N. Chandrababu Naidu
- Preceded by: Office established

Member of Parliament, Lok Sabha
- Incumbent
- Assumed office 16 May 2014
- Preceded by: Killi Krupa Rani
- Constituency: Srikakulam, Andhra Pradesh

Personal details
- Born: 18 December 1987 (age 38) Nimmada, Andhra Pradesh, India
- Party: Telugu Desam Party
- Spouse: Bandaru Sri Sravya (m. 2017)
- Parent: Kinjarapu Yerran Naidu (father)
- Relatives: Kinjarapu Atchannaidu (uncle); Adireddy Bhavani (sister); Bandaru Satyanarayana Murthy (father-in-law); Adireddy Srinivas(brother-in-law)
- Education: Purdue University (B.Sc); Long Island University (M.BA)

Kinjarapu Ram Mohan Naidu (born 18 December 1987) is an Indian politician who is serving as the 33rd Minister of Civil Aviation since June 2024. He represents the Srikakulam Lok Sabha constituency and has been elected in the 16th, 17th, and 18th Lok Sabha. He first won the seat in the 2014 Indian general election and was re-elected in 2019 and 2024 as a candidate of the Telugu Desam Party. He serves as the National General Secretary of the TDP and as the party's leader in the Lok Sabha.

== Early life and education ==
Naidu was born in Nimmada, Srikakulam. He is the son of Kinjarapu Yerran Naidu, a member of the Telugu Desam Party, and Kinjarapu Vijayakumari. His father was a Member of Legislative Assembly (MLA) from the Tekkali constituency and subsequently became a Member of Parliament (MP) from Srikakulam, later serving as a Union Minister for Rural Development in the United Front government between 1996 and 1998.

He completed his primary schooling in Srikakulam and later on joined Delhi Public School, R. K. Puram, Delhi, after his father became an MP and moved to Delhi. He then earned a bachelor's degree in electrical engineering from Purdue University, United States, and an MBA from Long Island University. He worked for a year in Singapore before returning to India. His uncle, Kinjarapu Atchannaidu, is a senior politician of the TDP and also a minister in the Government of Andhra Pradesh.

== Personal life ==
Naidu, born in Nimmada village Kotabommali mandal Srikakulam district, belongs to the Velama Community(caste).

He married Sravya Bandaru in June 2017, the youngest daughter of the former minister and Telugu Desam Party Vice-President, Bandaru Satyanarayana Murthy.

== Political career ==
Naidu entered politics in 2012 after the death of his father. He represents the Srikakulam Parliamentary constituency. Appointed as the constituency in-charge in 2013, he contested the 2014 elections and won by a margin of 127,576 votes. Kinjarupu is the second youngest Member of Parliament in the 16th Lok Sabha. He introduced a private member's bill demanding the establishment of a railway zone in Andhra Pradesh with Visakhapatnam as its headquarters. In the 2024 Indian general election in Andhra Pradesh, he represented TDP and won by a majority of 3,27,901 votes from the Srikakulam Lok Sabha constituency. He is the incumbent Union Minister of Civil Aviation, India.

=== Performance in Parliament ===
Performance in the Lok Sabha, 2019-20

MP performance parameters (2019–20)	Ram Mohan Naidu Kinjarapu
Attendance in parliament	90%, against State Average 79% and National Average 84%
Questions raised	69, against State Average 49 and National Average 49
Debates Participated	34, against State Average 13 and National Average 14.5
Private Member Bills	0, against State Average 0 and National Average 0.3
Number of criminal cases	None

=== Parliamentary Committees ===
He is a member of the standing committee on Railways and Home Affairs, Consultative Committee on Ministry of Tourism and Culture and in the Committee on Welfare of other Backward Classes and Official Language Department in the 16th Lok Sabha.

=== At the United Nations ===
Kinjarapu has represented India at the 72nd session of the United Nations General Assembly in the 22nd meeting of the first committee on Disarmament. He reiterated India's commitment to upholding the UN Charter's ideals and promoting international peace through multilateral cooperation. Representing India at the United Nations, he emphasized the importance of advancing nuclear disarmament and non-proliferation efforts.

== As the Minister for Civil Aviation ==
On 10 June 2024, Naidu was allocated the Ministry of Civil Aviation.

On 12 June 2025 he visited Ahmedabad, Gujarat shortly after the crash of London-bound Air India flight AI171

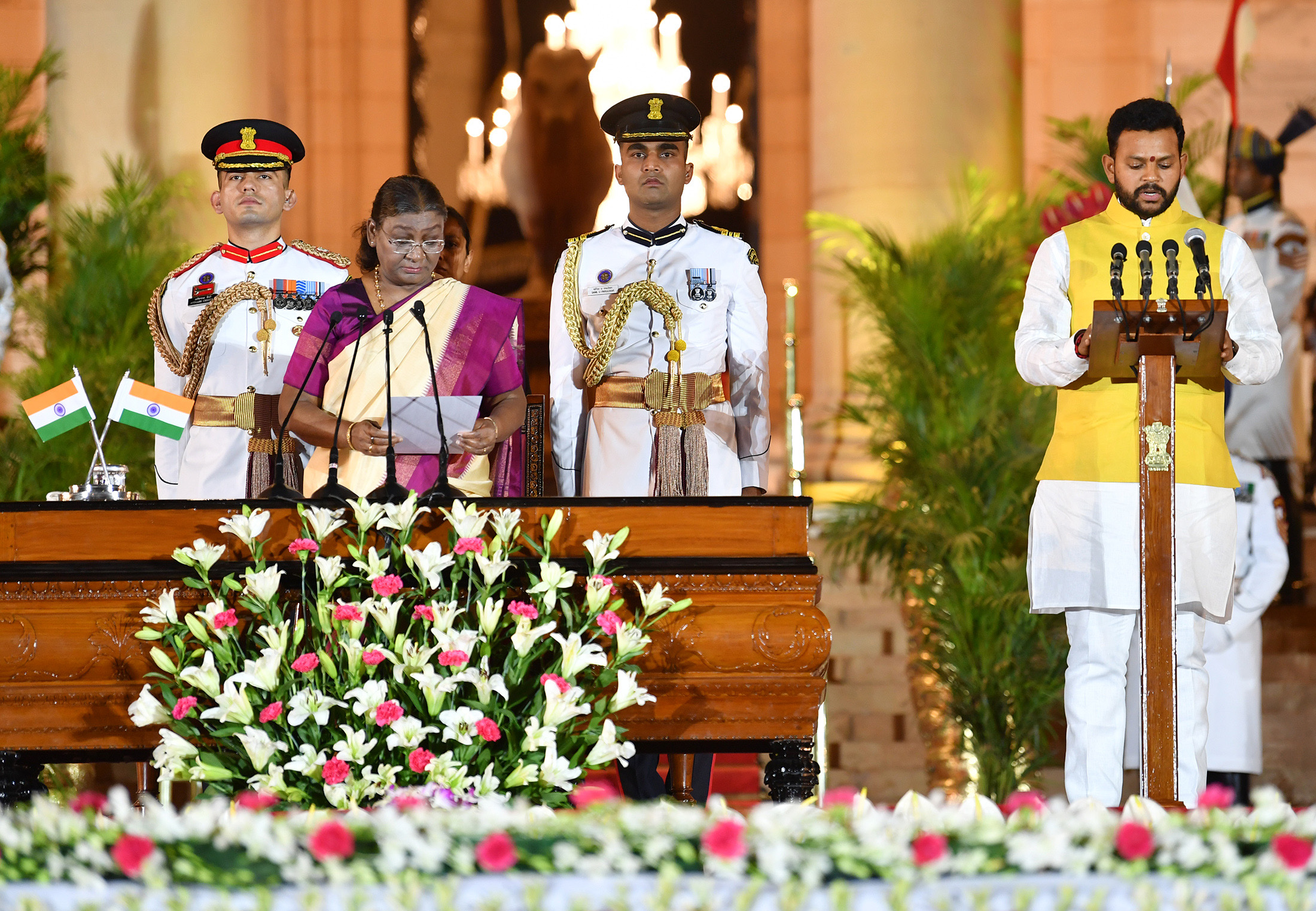
President Droupadi Murmu administering the oath as Cabinet Minister to Naidu

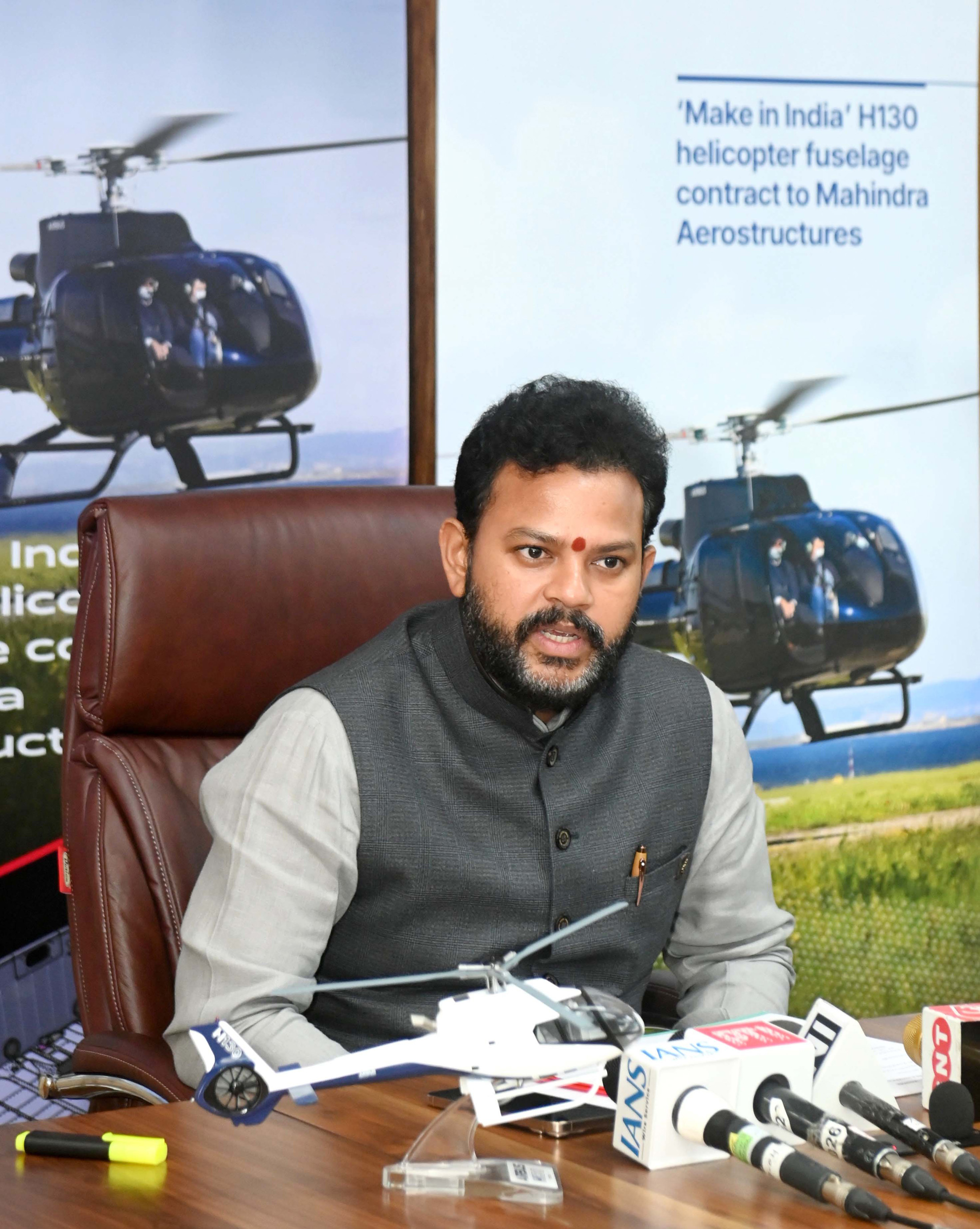
Naidu chairs a meeting of the Ministry of Civil Aviation

== Electoral history ==
Election results
Year	Office	Constituency	Party	Votes	%	Opponent	Party	Votes	%	Result	Ref
2014	MP	Srikakulam	Telugu Desam Party	556,163	52.90	Reddy Shanthi	YSR Congress Party	428,591	40.76	Won	
2019	MP	Srikakulam	Telugu Desam Party	534,544	46.19	Duvvada Srinivas	YSR Congress Party	527,891	45.61	Won	
2024	MP	Srikakulam	Telugu Desam Party	754,328	61.05	Perada Tilak	YSR Congress Party	426,427	34.51	Won	

== Policy positions ==
In October 2019, he wrote an article in The News Minute criticizing the Andhra Pradesh government under Y. S. Jagan Mohan Reddy for its sand mining policy. He argued that the ban on sand mining from May to September 2019 disrupted the construction industry and affected the livelihoods of over 2 million laborers.

== See also ==
- Third Modi ministry
