= O.V.Peta =

- Village
- Interactive map of O.V.Peta
- Location in Andhra Pradesh, India
- Coordinates: 18°28′58″N 83°50′24″E
- Country: India
- State: Andhra Pradesh
- District: Srikakulam

Languages
  - Official: Telugu
- Time zone: UTC+5:30 (IST)
- Lok Sabha constituency: Srikakulam
- Vidhan Sabha constituency: Amadalavalasa

O.V.Peta (or Opivada venkam peta) is a village in Srikakulam district of the Indian state of Andhra Pradesh. It is located in Burja mandal of Srikakulam revenue division.

== Demographics ==
As of 2011 census, There are 511 Houses in village. Total Population: 1705. Male: 849, Female: 856. Literates : 836.
