= Srikakulam Lok Sabha constituency =

Lok Sabha constituency in Andhra Pradesh

Coordinates: 18.3°N 83.9°E

Srikakulam AP-2
- Lok Sabha constituency
- Interactive Map Outlining Srikakulam Lok Sabha constituency

Constituency details
- Country: India
- Region: South India
- State: Andhra Pradesh
- Assembly constituencies: Ichchapuram; Palasa; Tekkali; Pathapatnam; Srikakulam; Amadalavalasa Narasannapeta
- Established: 1952
- Reservation: None

Member of Parliament
- 18th Lok Sabha
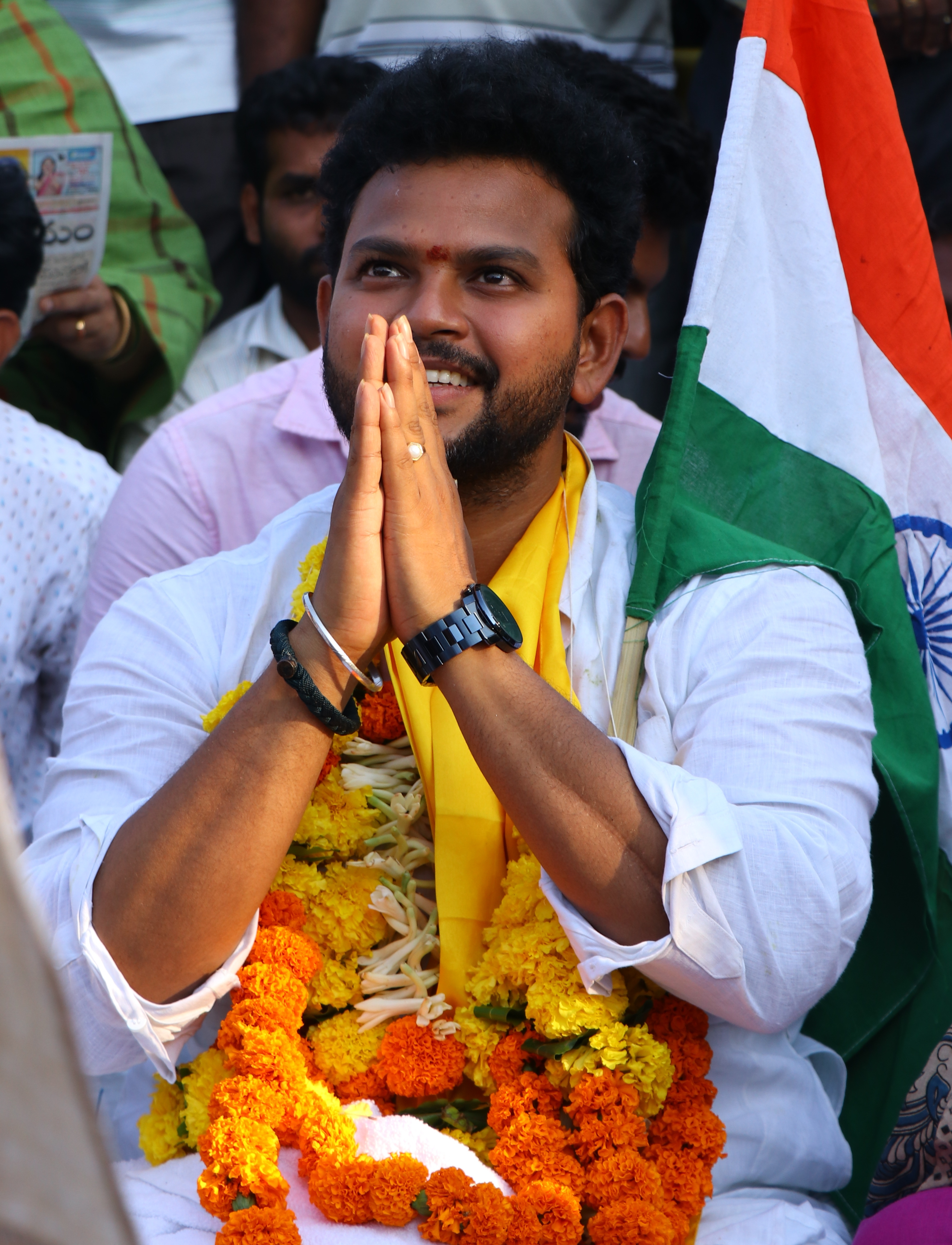
- Incumbent Kinjarapu Ram Mohan Naidu; Union Minister of Civil Aviation
- Party: TDP
- Alliance: NDA
- Elected year: 2024
- Preceded by: Killi Krupa Rani,

Srikakulam Lok Sabha constituency is one of the twenty-five lok sabha constituencies of Andhra Pradesh in India. It comprises seven assembly segments and belongs to Srikakulam district .

Most successful political parties
1. INC (8 Times) (47.0%)
2. TDP (8 Times) (47.0%)
3. Swatantra Party (1 time) (3.00%)
4. Independent (1 time) (3.00%)

== Assembly segments ==
The seven Assembly segments of Srikakulam Lok Sabha constituency are:

#	Name	District	Member	Party	Leading (in 2024)
1	Ichchapuram	Srikakulam	Ashok Bendalam	TDP	TDP
2	Palasa	Srikakulam	Gouthu Sireesha	TDP	TDP
3	Tekkali	Srikakulam	Kinjarapu Atchannaidu	TDP	TDP
4	Pathapatnam	Srikakulam	Mamidi Govinda Rao	TDP	TDP
5	Srikakulam	Srikakulam	Gondu Shankar	TDP	TDP
6	Amadalavalasa	Srikakulam	Koona Ravi Kumar	TDP	TDP
8	Narasannapeta	Srikakulam	Baggu Ramanamurthy	TDP	TDP

== Members of Parliament ==
Year	Member	Party
1952	Boddepalli Rajagopala Rao	Independent
1957	Boddepalli Rajagopala Rao	Indian National Congress
1962	Boddepalli Rajagopala Rao	Indian National Congress
1967	Gouthu Latchanna	Swatantra Party
1971	Boddepalli Rajagopala Rao	Indian National Congress
1977	Boddepalli Rajagopala Rao	Indian National Congress
1980	Boddepalli Rajagopala Rao	Indian National Congress
1984	Hanumantu Appayyadora	Telugu Desam Party
1989	Kanithi Viswanatham	Indian National Congress
1991	Kanithi Viswanatham	Indian National Congress
1996	Kinjarapu Yerran Naidu	Telugu Desam Party
1998	Kinjarapu Yerran Naidu	Telugu Desam Party
1999	Kinjarapu Yerran Naidu	Telugu Desam Party
2004	Kinjarapu Yerran Naidu	Telugu Desam Party
2009	Killi Krupa Rani	Indian National Congress
2014	Kinjarapu Ram Mohan Naidu	Telugu Desam Party
2019	Kinjarapu Ram Mohan Naidu	Telugu Desam Party
2024	Kinjarapu Ram Mohan Naidu	Telugu Desam Party

== Election results ==
Vote share of Winning candidates
2024	61.05%
2019	45.91%
2014	52.77%
2009	42.20%
2004	50.00%
1999	56.81%
1998	43.14%
1996	36.82%
1991	42.60%
1989	47.70%
1984	60.68%
1980	49.33%
1977	49.12%
1971	69.48%
1967	56.37%
1962	42.60%
1957	55.34%
1952	28.00%

=== 2024 ===
2024 Indian general election: Srikakulam
Party	Candidate	Votes	%	±%
TDP	K. Ram Mohan Naidu	754,328	61.05	▲15.14
YSRCP	Tilak Perada	426,427	34.51	▼10.83
NOTA	None of the Above	24,605	1.99	▼0.20
INC	Pedada Parameswara Rao	7,172	0.58	▼0.60
Majority		327,901	26.54	▲25.97
Turnout		1,241,169	75.37	▲0.89
TDP hold		Swing		

=== 2019 ===
2019 Indian general election: Srikakulam
Party	Candidate	Votes	%	±%
TDP	K. Ram Mohan Naidu	534,544	45.91	▼6.86
YSRCP	Duvvada Srinivas	527,891	45.34	▲4.68
JSP	Metta Ramarao	31,956	2.74	
NOTA	None of the Above	25,545	2.19	▲1.61
INC	Dola Jagan	13,745	1.18	▼1.11
BJP	Perla Samba Murthy	8,390	0.72	
Majority		6,653	0.57	▼11.54
Turnout		1,157,329	74.48	▲0.05
TDP hold		Swing		

=== 2014 ===
2014 Indian general election: Srikakulam
Party	Candidate	Votes	%	±%
TDP	K. Ram Mohan Naidu	556,545	52.77	▲19.61
YSRCP	Reddy Shanthi	428,853	40.66	
INC	Killi Krupa Rani	24,171	2.29	▼39.91
BSP	Boddepalli Rajarao	8,049	0.76	▼0.94
NOTA	None of the Above	6,138	0.58	
Majority		127,692	12.11	▲3.07
Turnout		1,052,115	74.43	▼1.24
TDP gain from INC		Swing		

=== 2009 ===
2009 Indian general election: Srikakulam
Party	Candidate	Votes	%	±%
INC	Killi Krupa Rani	387,694	42.20	▼3.40
TDP	K. Yerran Naidu	304,707	33.16	▼16.84
PRP	Varudu Kalyani	181,100	19.71	
BSP	Tankala Sudhakara Rao	15,584	1.70	▼0.10
BJP	Duppala Ravindara Babu	11,837	1.29	
Majority		82,987	9.04	▲4.64
Turnout		918,772	75.67	▲0.15
INC gain from TDP		Swing		

=== 2004 ===
2004 Indian general election: Srikakulam
Party	Candidate	Votes	%	±%
TDP	K. Yerran Naidu	361,906	50.00	▼6.81
INC	Killi Krupa Rani	330,027	45.60	▲3.51
IND	Dunga Rangarao Naidu	13,848	1.91	
BSP	Mylapalli Lakshmudu	13,011	1.80	
IND	Tammineni Jaganmohan Rao	4,982	0.69	
Majority		31,879	4.40	▼10.32
Turnout		723,774	75.52	▲6.86
TDP hold		Swing		

=== 1999 ===
1999 Indian general election: Srikakulam
Party	Candidate	Votes	%	±%
TDP	K. Yerran Naidu	373,851	56.81	▲13.67
INC	Kanithi Viswanatham	276,969	42.09	▲15.63
AJBP	Appala Naidu Golive	7,280	1.11	
Majority		96,882	14.72	▲1.72
Turnout		676,413	68.66	▼0.06
TDP hold		Swing		

=== 1998 ===
1998 Indian general election: Srikakulam
Party	Candidate	Votes	%	±%
TDP	K. Yerran Naidu	286,582	43.14	▲6.32
NTDP	Appayya Dora Hanumanthu	200,217	30.14	▼1.24
INC	Dharmana Prasada Rao	175,762	26.46	▼3.17
IND	Tammineni Jaganmohanarao	1,792	0.27	
Majority		86,365	13.00	▲7.56
Turnout		673,199	68.72	▲2.90
TDP hold		Swing		

=== 1996 ===
1996 Indian general election: Srikakulam
Party	Candidate	Votes	%	±%
TDP	K. Yerran Naidu	234,278	36.82	▼0.96
NTDP	Jaya Krishna Mandamuri	199,700	31.38	
INC	Kanithi Viswanatham	188,559	29.63	▼12.97
BJP	Krishna Chandra Rao Namballa	6,328	0.99	▼0.97
Majority		34,578	5.44	▲0.62
Turnout		647,219	65.82	▼0.19
TDP gain from INC		Swing		

=== 1991 ===
1991 Indian general election: Srikakulam
Party	Candidate	Votes	%	±%
INC	Kanithi Viswanatham	235,641	42.60	▼5.10
TDP	Appayyadora Hanumanthli	208,977	37.78	▼1.63
IND	K. Yerran Naidu	83,292	15.06	
BJP	Attada Appalanaidu	10,823	1.96	
IND	Atla Appojamma	5,794	1.05	
Majority		26,664	4.82	▼3.47
Turnout		568,263	66.01	▼7.38
INC hold		Swing		

=== 1989 ===
1989 Indian general election: Srikakulam
Party	Candidate	Votes	%	±%
INC	Kanithi Viswanatham	288,263	47.70	▲12.35
TDP	Appayyadora Hanumanthu	238,149	39.41	▼21.27
IND	Bammidi Narayanaswamy	65,317	10.81	
IND	Suryanarayana	12,546	2.08	
Majority		50,114	8.29	▼17.04
Turnout		632,341	73.39	▲0.67
INC gain from TDP		Swing		

=== 1984 ===
1984 Indian general election: Srikakulam
Party	Candidate	Votes	%	±%
TDP	Appayyadora Hanumantu	298,167	60.68	
INC	Boddepalli Rajagopala Rao	173,699	35.35	▼13.98
IND	Metta Jaggubhatlu	11,143	2.27	
IND	Bompalli Ramanna	6,485	1.32	
IND	N. S. N. Reddy	1,870	0.38	
Majority		124,468	25.33	▲5.58
Turnout		503,805	72.72	▲9.22
TDP gain from INC(I)		Swing		

=== 1980 ===
1980 Indian general election: Srikakulam
Party	Candidate	Votes	%	±%
INC(I)	Boddepalli Rajagopala Rao	197,336	49.33	▲0.21
JP(S)	Gouthu Latchanna	118,347	29.58	
JP	Majji Narayana Rao	43,205	10.80	▼36.03
IND	Metta Jaggu Bhatlu	20,275	5.07	
IND	Majji Sriramulu	12,619	3.15	
IND	Bompalli Ramanna	5,042	1.26	
IND	Venkataramana Chodi Pilli	3,242	0.81	
Majority		78,989	19.75	▲17.46
Turnout		411,259	63.50	▼3.93
INC(I) gain from INC		Swing		

=== 1977 ===
1977 Indian general election: Srikakulam
Party	Candidate	Votes	%	±%
INC	Boddepalli Rajagopala Rao	187,125	49.12	▼20.36
JP	Gouthu Latchanna	178,391	46.83	
IND	Bompalli Ramanna	15,435	4.05	
Majority		8,734	2.29	▼38.67
Turnout		394,514	67.43	▼0.41
INC gain from JP		Swing		

=== 1971 ===
1971 Indian general election: Srikakulam
Party	Candidate	Votes	%	±%
INC	Boddepalli Rajagopala Rao	233,171	69.48	▲31.04
SWA	N. G. Ranga	95,710	28.52	▼27.85
IND	S. Vanajanabham	6,736	2.01	
Majority		137,461	40.96	▲23.03
Turnout		345,636	67.84	▼3.32
INC gain from SWA		Swing		

=== 1967 ===
1967 Indian general election: Srikakulam
Party	Candidate	Votes	%	±%
SWA	Gouthu Latchanna	189,771	56.37	▲25.86
INC	Boddepalli Rajagopala Rao	129,413	38.44	▼4.16
IND	K. S. Rao	17,464	5.19	
Majority		60,358	17.93	▲5.84
Turnout		349,154	71.16	▲9.35
SWA gain from INC		Swing		

=== 1962 ===
1962 Indian general election: Srikakulam
Party	Candidate	Votes	%	±%
INC	Boddepalli Rajagopala Rao	112,172	42.60	▼12.74
SWA	Suggu Srinivasa Reddy	80,357	30.51	
IND	Kappagantula Subha Rao	37,439	14.22	
IND	Gunda Appananamma	17,640	6.70	
IND	Sardar Sreepada	15,735	5.98	
Majority		31,815	12.09	▲1.41
Turnout		273,876	61.81	▲25.05
INC hold		Swing		

=== 1957 ===
1957 Indian general election: Srikakulam
Party	Candidate	Votes	%	±%
INC	Boddepalli Rajagopala Rao	84,797	55.34	▲32.40
IND	Karimi Narayanappala Naidu	68,441	44.66	
Majority		16,356	10.68	▲5.62
Turnout		153,238	36.76	▼13.78
INC gain from Independent		Swing		

=== 1952 ===
1952 Indian general election: Srikakulam
Party	Candidate	Votes	%	±%
IND	Boddepalli Rajagopala Rao	51,992	28.00	
INC	Pasupati Lakshmi Narsinha Raju	42,593	22.94	
KLP	Kappasatula Subba Rao	40,305	21.71	
IND	Karisni Narayana Appala Naidu	31,175	16.79	
Socialist	S. V. Surya Laxmi Sambasiva Rao	19,610	10.56	
Majority		9,399	5.06	
Turnout		185,675	50.54	
Independent win (new seat)				

== See also ==
- List of constituencies of the Andhra Pradesh Legislative Assembly
