= Ganguvada =

- village
- Interactive map of Ganguvada
- Location in Andhra Pradesh, India Ganguvada (India)
- Coordinates: 18°40′00″N 84°07′00″E
- Country: India
- State: Andhra Pradesh
- District: Srikakulam

Population (2001)
  - Total: 2,065

Languages
  - Official: Telugu
- Time zone: UTC+5:30 (IST)
- Postal code: 532213
- Vehicle registration: AP30

Ganguvada is a village under Pathapatnam mandal in Srikakulam district, Andhra Pradesh.

Ganguvada station is located on Naupada-Gunupur railway. It is 8 km from Pathapatnam.

== Demographics ==
According to Indian census, 2001, the demographic details of this village is as follows:

- Total Population: 2,065 in 498 Households.
- Male Population: 1,015
- Female Population: 1,050
- Children Under 6-years: 321 (Boys - 155 and Girls - 166)
- Total Literates: 832
