= K. Venkata Ramana Murthy =

Indian politician

Kalamata Venkata Ramana Murthy (born 1965) is an Indian politician from Andhra Pradesh. He was a former member of the Andhra Pradesh Legislative Assembly from Pathapatnam Assembly constituency in Srikakulam district representing the YSR Congress Party.

== Early life and education ==
Murthy is from Pathapatnam, Srikakulam district, Andhra Pradesh. He is the son of the late Mohan Rao, a five-time MLA. He is a farmer. He studied till Class 12 at Sri Rama Junior College, Garivadi and passed the intermediate examinations in 1981.

== Career ==
Murthy won from Pathapatnam Assembly constituency in the 2014 Andhra Pradesh Legislative Assembly election representing the YSR Congress Party. He polled 69,320 votes and defeated his nearest rival, Vijaya Ramaraju Setrucharla of the Telugu Desam Party, by a margin of 3,865 votes. In the seat which his father won five times, Murthy also contested on TDP for the first time in the 2009 election but lost to the Indian National Congress candidate Vijayaramaraju Satrucherla by a margin of 20,790 votes. He won in 2014 YSR Congress ticket, but lost again in 2019, also on TDP ticket.
