= Gouthu Syam Sunder Sivaji =

Indian politician

Member of Legislative Assembly, Andhra Pradesh
- In office 2014–2019
- Preceded by: Juttu Jagannaikulu
- Succeeded by: Seediri Appalaraju
- Constituency: Palasa
- In office 1985–2004
- Preceded by: Majji Narayana Rao
- Succeeded by: Constituency abolished
- Constituency: Sompeta

Personal details
- Born: 22 May 1950 (age 76)
- Party: Telugu Desam Party
- Children: Gouthu Sireesha (daughter)
- Parent: Gouthu Latchanna (father)

Gouthu Syam Sunder Sivaji (born 22 May 1950) is an Indian politician from Andhra Pradesh. He was a former six-time member of the Andhra Pradesh Legislative Assembly from Palasa Assembly constituency in Srikakulam district representing the Telugu Desam Party.

== Early life ==
Sivaji is from Sompeta, Srikakulam district, Andhra Pradesh. He is the son of former five time Sompeta legislator, minister and freedom fighter Gouthu Latchanna. He completed his B.Com. and later did MA at Kakatiya University, Srikakulam. He married Vijaya Lakshmi. His daughter Gouthu Sireesha, is also an elected MLA.

== Career ==
Sivaji won the Palasa Assembly constituency in the 2014 Andhra Pradesh Legislative Assembly election representing the Telugu Desam Party. He polled 69,658 votes and defeated his nearest rival, Vajja Babu Rao of the YSR Congress Party, by a margin of 17,525 votes. He was first elected as an MLA in 1985 from Sompeta Assembly constituency and retained the seat for the next four consecutive terms winning the Legislative Assembly elections in 1989, 1994, 1999 and 2004. After the constituency was abolished in 2008, he contested from the newly formed Palasa Assembly constituency in the 2009 Andhra Pradesh Legislative Assembly election, but lost to Juttu Jagannaikulu of the Indian National Congress, by a margin of 6,814 votes. However, he regained the seat in 2014 and completed the term to become a six-time MLA from Srikakulam district.
