= Pathapatnam Assembly constituency =

Constituency of the Andhra Pradesh Legislative Assembly, India

Coordinates: 18.75°N 84.09°E

Pathapatnam
- Constituency No. 4 for the Andhra Pradesh Legislative Assembly
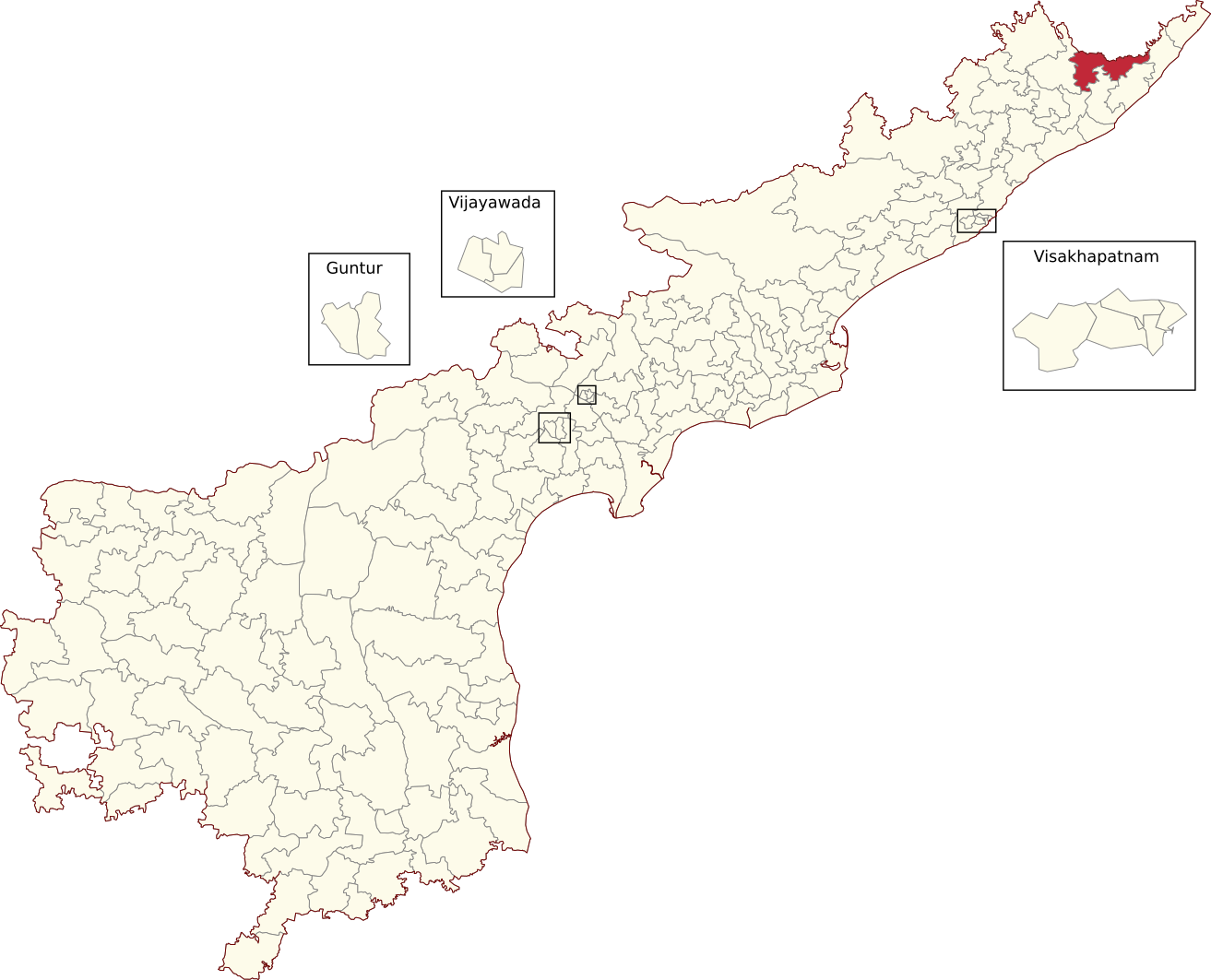
- Location of Pathapatnam Assembly constituency within Andhra Pradesh

Constituency details
- Country: India
- Region: South India
- State: Andhra Pradesh
- District: Srikakulam
- Lok Sabha constituency: Srikakulam
- Established: 1951
- Total electors: 216,221
- Reservation: None

Member of Legislative Assembly
- 16th Andhra Pradesh Legislative Assembly
- Incumbent Mamidi Govinda Rao
- Party: TDP
- Alliance: NDA
- Elected year: 2024

Pathapatnam Assembly constituency is a constituency in Srikakulam district of Andhra Pradesh that elects representatives to the Andhra Pradesh Legislative Assembly in India. It is one of the seven assembly segments of Srikakulam Lok Sabha constituency.

Mamidi Govinda Rao is the current MLA of the constituency, having won the 2024 Andhra Pradesh Legislative Assembly election from Telugu Desam Party. As of 2019, there are a total of 216,221 electors in the constituency. The constituency was established in 1951, as per the Delimitation Orders (1951).

== Mandals ==
The five mandals that form the assembly constituency are:

Mandal
Pathapatnam
Meliaputti
L. N. Peta
Kothur
Hiramandalam

Pathapatnam Assembly constituency

== Members of the Legislative Assembly ==
Year	Member	Political party
1952	Lukulapu Lakshmanadas	Indian National Congress
1955	Lukulapu Lakshmanadas	Indian National Congress
1962	Lukulapu Lakshmanadas	Indian National Congress
1967	P. Gunnayya	Indian National Congress
1972	Sukka Pagadalu	Indian National Congress
1978	Kalamata Mohana Rao	Independent
1983	Thota Tulasidas Naidu	Telugu Desam Party
1985	Dharmana Narayana Rao	Indian National Congress
1989	Kalamata Mohana Rao	Telugu Desam Party
1994	Kalamata Mohana Rao	Telugu Desam Party
1996 by-election	Lakshmi Parvathi	NTR Telugu Desam Party (Lakshmi Parvathi)
1999	Kalamata Mohana Rao	Telugu Desam Party
2004	Kalamata Mohana Rao	Telugu Desam Party
2009	Vijaya Ramaraju Setrucharla	Indian National Congress
2014	Kalamata Venkata Ramana Murthy	YSR Congress Party
2019	Reddy Shanthi	YSR Congress Party
2024	Mamidi Govinda Rao	Telugu Desam Party

== Election results ==
=== 2024 ===
2024 Andhra Pradesh Legislative Assembly election: Palasa (2,22,378)
Party	Candidate	Votes	%	±%
TDP	Mamidi Govinda Rao	89,452	39.38	▲11.21
YSRCP	Reddy Shanthi	62,925	27.7	▼7.61
	Remaining	7,354	3.24	▲1.16
NOTA	None of the above	3,604	1.59	▼0.35
Turnout		1,63,335	71.91	▲1.88
Registered electors		2,27167		
Majority		26,527	11.68	
TDP gain from YSRCP		Swing		

=== 2019 ===
2019 Andhra Pradesh Legislative Assembly election: Palasa (2,06,799)
Party	Candidate	Votes	%	±%
TDP	K. Venkata Ramana Murthy	61,390	28.17	▼5.61
YSRCP	Reddy Shanthi	76,941	35.31	▼0.46
JSP	G Gyana Sagar	5,508	2.53	New
	Remaining	4,543	2.08	▲0.14
NOTA	None of the above	4,217	1.94	▲1.43
Turnout		1,52,599	70.03	▼2.75
Registered electors		2,17,897		
Majority		15,551		
YSRCP hold		Swing	{{{swing}}}	

=== 2014 ===
2014 Andhra Pradesh Legislative Assembly election: Palasa
Party	Candidate	Votes	%	±%
TDP	S Vijaya Rama Raju	65,455	33.78	
YSRCP	K. Venkata Ramana Murthy	69,320	35.77	New
INC	P K Rao	1,508	0.78	
	Remaining	3,757	1.94	
NOTA	None of the above	998	0.51	
Turnout		1,41,038	72.78	
Registered electors		1,93,789		
Majority		3,865		
YSRCP gain from INC		Swing		

=== 2009 ===
2009 Andhra Pradesh Legislative Assembly election: Pathapatnam
Party	Candidate	Votes	%	±%
INC	Vijayaramaraju Satrucherla	58,936	46.76	−2.05
TDP	K. Venkata Ramana Murthy	38,146	30.26	−20.93
PRP	Palavalasa Karunakar Rao	20,339	16.14	
Majority		20,790	16.50	
Turnout		126,041	73.08	−0.95
INC gain from TDP		Swing		

=== 2004 ===
2004 Andhra Pradesh Legislative Assembly election: Pathapatnam
Party	Candidate	Votes	%	±%
TDP	Kalamata Mohan Rao	44,357	51.19	
INC	Gorle Haribabu Naidu	42,293	48.81	
Majority		2,064	2.38	
Turnout		86,650	74.03	
TDP hold		Swing		

=== 1999 ===
1999 Andhra Pradesh Legislative Assembly election: Pathapatnam
Party	Candidate	Votes	%	±%
TDP	Kalamata Mohan Rao	46,599	56.38	
INC	Gorle Haribabu Naidu	36044	43.61	
Majority		10,555	12.77	
Turnout		82643	74.03	
TDP hold		Swing		

=== 1994 ===
1994 Andhra Pradesh Legislative Assembly election: Pathapatnam
Party	Candidate	Votes	%	±%
TDP	Kalamata Mohan Rao	48,425	56.76	
INC	Dharmana Narayana Rao	36,889	43.24	
Majority		11,536	13.52	
Turnout		82643	72.13	
TDP hold		Swing		

=== 1989 ===
1989 Andhra Pradesh Legislative Assembly election: Pathapatnam
Party	Candidate	Votes	%	±%
TDP	Kalamata Rao	41,040	49.8	+3.90
INC	Narayana Rao Dharmana	40,766	49.50	−4.1
Independent	Laxmana Misro	20,339	16.14	
Majority		274	0.3	−7.3
Turnout		85,618	74.7	−2.1
TDP hold		Swing		

=== 1985 ===
1985 Andhra Pradesh Legislative Assembly election: Pathapatnam
Party	Candidate	Votes	%	±%
INC	Dharmana Rao	53.6	53.6	+25.7
TDP	Mathala Lokhanadham	32,834	45.9	+8.1
Independent	Gonthi Rao	377	0.5	
Majority		5,574	7.6	−2
Turnout		73,003	76.8	+1.5
INC gain from TDP		Swing		

=== 1983 ===
1983 Andhra Pradesh Legislative Assembly election: Pathapatnam
Party	Candidate	Votes	%	±%
TDP	Thota Tulasidas Naidu	24,264	37.8	
INC	Kalamata Rao	17,923	27.9	+8.2
Independent	Dharmana Narayanarao	16,535	25.8	
Independent	Janakamma Lukalapu	4,806	7.5	
LKD	Pyla Rao	477	0.7	
Independent	Venkataramana Tata	173	0.3	
Majority		6,341	9.6	+8.3
Turnout		65,745	75.3	N/A
TDP gain from Independent		Swing		

=== 1978 ===
1978 Andhra Pradesh Legislative Assembly election: Pathapatnam
Party	Candidate	Votes	%	±%
Independent	Kalamata Mohanarao	19,935	32.4	
JP	Lukulapu Lakshmanadas	19,111	31.0	
INC	Kamakshi Brahma	12,141	19.7	−39.02
Communist Party Of India	Darapu Rajulu	6,639	10.8	−8.24
Independent	Varanasi Narayanarao	2,071	3.4	
Independent	Killamsetty Kumar	1,152	1.9	
Independent	Lingala Janardhanarao	565	0.9	−18.35
Majority		824	1.3	+8.3
Turnout		64,006	75.3	+20.88
Independent gain from INC		Swing		

=== 1972 ===
1972 Andhra Pradesh Legislative Assembly election: Patapatnam
Party	Candidate	Votes	%	±%
INC	Sukka Pagadalu	24,162	58.72	+16.53
SWA	Seema Rajaiah	16,076	39.07	−1.88
Independent	Gudivada Rao	911	2.21	
Majority		8,086	19.65	+18.41
Turnout		41,149	54.42	+6.87
INC hold		Swing		

=== 1967 ===
1967 Andhra Pradesh Legislative Assembly election: Patapatnam
Party	Candidate	Votes	%	±%
INC	P. Gunnayya	13,419	42.19	−20.79
SWA	S. Rajalah	13,025	40.95	+3.94
Independent	P. Dandasi	2,264	7.12	
Independent	R. Chandraiah	1,734	5.45	
Independent	K. Paparao	1,362	4.28	
Majority		394	1.24	−21.69
Turnout		31,804	47.55	
INC hold		Swing		

=== 1962 ===
1962 Andhra Pradesh Legislative Assembly election: Patapatnam
Party	Candidate	Votes	%	±%
INC	Lukalapu Dasu	16,527	62.98	+32.9
SWA	Sampathirao Lakshmipathi	9,714	37.01	
Majority		11,536	25.97	+20.25
Turnout		26,241		
INC hold		Swing		

=== 1955 ===
1955 Andhra State Legislative Assembly election: Patapatnam
Party	Candidate	Votes	%	±%
INC	Lukulapu Lakshmanadas	24,293	30.08	−6.45
INC	Pothula Gunnayya	19,672	24.36	−12.17
CPI	Ghasi Ramulu	13,680	16.94	−9.47
CPI	Darapu Govindarajulu	13,189	16.33	−10.08
Independent	Moruru Sangamesu	4,545	5.63	
Independent	Alikan Appalaswamy	3,235	4.01	
Independent	Saketa Guruvulu	2,149	2.66	
Majority		30,285	37.50	+27.38
Turnout		80,763	75.25	+20.05
INC hold		Swing		

=== 1952 ===
1952 Madras State Legislative Assembly election: Pathapatnam
Party	Candidate	Votes	%	±%
INC	Lukulapu Lakshmanadas	29,535	36.53%	36.53%
CPI	Darapu Govindarajulu	21,354	26.41%	
Independent	Challa Narasimham	10,683	13.21%	
Independent	Mandangi Pentananaidu	7,536	9.32%	
KLP	Mekala Sundaranarayana	7,434	9.19%	
KLP	Timpurana Raghavadas	4,310	5.33%	
Margin of victory		8,181	10.12%	
Turnout		80,852	55.20%	
Registered electors		1,46,470		
INC win (new seat)				

== See also ==
- List of constituencies of the Andhra Pradesh Legislative Assembly
