= Killi Krupa Rani =

Indian politician

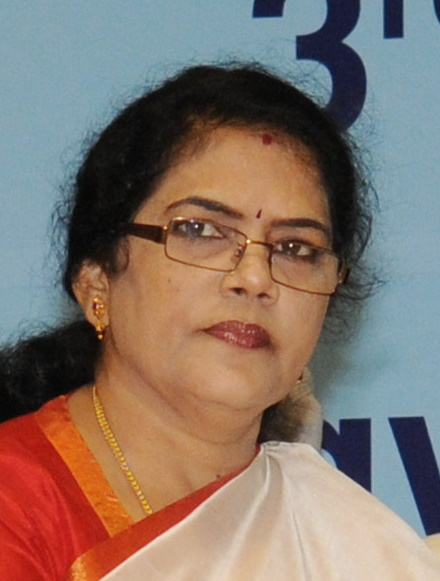

Minister of State for Communications and Information Technology
- In office 28 October 2012 – 26 May 2014 Serving with Milind Deora
- Prime Minister: Manmohan Singh
- Minister: Kapil Sibal
- Preceded by: Sachin Pilot
- Succeeded by: Sanjay Shamrao Dhotre

Member of Parliament, Lok Sabha
- In office 16 May 2009 – 16 May 2014
- Preceded by: Kinjarapu Yerran Naidu
- Succeeded by: Kinjarapu Ram Mohan Naidu
- Constituency: Srikakulam

Personal details
- Born: 19 November 1965 (age 60) Srikakulam, Andhra Pradesh
- Party: Indian National Congress (until 2019; since 2024)
- Other political affiliations: YSR Congress Party (2019–2024)
- Spouse: Rammohan Rao
- Children: 2
- Profession: Doctor, Politician

Killi Krupa Rani (born 19 November 1965) is an Indian politician from Andhra Pradesh. She is a former member of the Indian Parliament and previously represented Srikakulam from 2009 to 2014. She belongs to Kalinga caste. In April 2024, she resigned from YSRCP and joined the Indian National Congress.

== Personal life ==
She hails from Tekkali, Srikakulam district in Andhra Pradesh. Her parents are Kamayya and Kouosalya. She married Rammohan Rao in 1985 and has two children. She did her MBBS from Andhra Medical College, Visakhapatnam. She is the convenor of Rammohan Rao Charitable Trust, which works towards providing free drinking water in rural areas, free medical camps, free deliveries and free cataract operations to the blind. Her hobbies include shooting sports and squash.

== Career ==
She entered politics and joined the Indian National Congress party, on the eve of completion of Y. S. Rajashekar Reddy's padhayatra. She lost the 2004 general election but won in 2009 defeating four-time MP, Yerran Naidu. In October 2012, she was inducted into the 15th Lok Sabha and Manmohan Singh's cabinet as Minister of State, Communications and Information Technology. She was a Member, Committee on Health and Family Welfare; Member, Consultative Committee, Ministry of External Affairs and Member, Central Social Welfare Board.

In 2014, she lost to Ram Mohan Naidu Kinjarapu. She quit Indian National Congress and later joined YSRCP on 28 February 2019. In 2024, she quit the YSRCP citing her dissatisfaction with the leadership and rejoined the INC in the presence of the state unit president Y. S. Sharmila.

== Electoral History ==
=== Lok Sabha ===
Year	Constituency	Party	Votes	%	Opponent	Party	Votes	%	Result	Margin	%
2004	Srikakulam	INC	3,30,027	45.60	Kinjarapu Yerran Naidu	TDP	3,61,906	50.00	Lost	-31,879	-4.40
2009	Srikakulam	INC	3,87,694	42.20	Kinjarapu Yerran Naidu	TDP	3,04,707	33.16	Won	+82,987	+9.04
2014	Srikakulam	INC	24,171	2.29	Kinjarapu Rammohan Naidu	TDP	5,56,545	52.77	Lost	-5,32,374	-50.48

== Interests ==
She is an avid reader and takes an interest in music, history, literature and travelling. She also published a book entitled The 100 years saga of Nehru's family.
