= Boddepalli Rajagopala Rao =

Indian politician

Member of Parliament, Lok Sabha
- In office 1971–1984
- Preceded by: N. G. Ranga
- Succeeded by: Appayyadora Hanumantu
- Constituency: Srikakulam
- In office 1952 - 1967
- Preceded by: Constituency Established
- Succeeded by: N. G. Ranga
- Constituency: Srikakulam

Personal details
- Born: 12 March 1923 Akkulapeta, Amadalavalasa, Madras Presidency, British India (now Andhra Pradesh, India)
- Died: 22 February 1992 (aged 68) Visakhapatnam
- Party: Indian National Congress
- Spouse: Seethamma
- Children: 3; 2 sons and 1 daughter

Boddepalli Rajagopala Rao (12 March 1923 – 22 February 1992) was an Indian politician.

== Political history ==
Boddepalli Rajagopala Rao represented Srikakulam (Lok Sabha constituency) in Andhra Pradesh for six terms between 1952 and 1967 (1st, 2nd and 3rd Lok Sabha) and 1971 to 1984 (5th, 6th and 7th Lok Sabha). He was elected to the Indian Parliament for the first time as Independent candidate and later joined Indian National Congress.

He started the career from Panchayat level and reached the highest forum of democracy in India. He was director of Andhra Pradesh State Co-operative Bank, Hyderabad for 6 years.

Rajagopala Rao Boddepalli died on 22 February 1992 at Visakhapatnam at the age of 68 years.

His efforts are responsible for various measures being taken up by the government for the upliftment of the backward castes in north Andhra region.

As a tribute to him People of Akkivaram panchayat unveiled his statue at Kotharoad junction, Srikakulam for his centenary birth celebrations.

The Vamsadhara project built on Vamsadhara River in Srikakulam district has been named after Boddepalli Rajagopala Rao.

== Personal life ==
His parents were Boddepalli Sitaramaswamy and Annapoorna and he was born at Akkulapeta, near Amadalavalasa in 1923. He was educated at Vizianagaram College and Pachaiyappa's College, Madras.

His wife's name is Seethamma and they have two sons and one daughter.
