= Reddy Shanthi =

Indian politician

Member of the Andhra Pradesh Legislative Assembly
- In office 23 May 2019 – 4 June 2024
- Preceded by: Kalamata Venkata Ramana
- Succeeded by: Mamidi Govinda Rao
- Constituency: Pathapatnam

Personal details
- Born: c. 1969
- Party: YSR Congress Party
- Parent(s): Palavalasa Rajasekharam, Indumati

Reddy Shanthi (born c. 1969) is an Indian politician from Srikakulam district, Andhra Pradesh. She is elected to the Andhra Pradesh Legislative Assembly and is currently serving as the Member of the Legislative Assembly (MLA) from Pathapatnam constituency of Srikakulam district on behalf of YSR Congress Party (YSRCP).

== Political career ==
Reddy Shanthi contested the 2014 Indian general election from Srikakulam constituency on behalf of YSRCP. She lost to her opponent, Ram Mohan Naidu Kinjarapu of Telugu Desam Party (TDP), by a margin of 1,27,572 votes with 4,28,591 votes polled for her.

She later contested the 2019 Andhra Pradesh Legislative Assembly election from Pathapatnam constituency on behalf of YSRCP and won as the MLA with a majority of 15,551 votes over her nearest opponent and the incumbent MLA, Kalamata Venkata Ramana of TDP, with 76,941 votes polled for her.

== Personal life ==
Reddy Shanthi hails from Palakonda, Parvathipuram Manyam district, (erstwhile Srikakulam district) Andhra Pradesh. Her father, Palavalasa Rajashekaram, was a former member of Rajya Sabha, while her grandparents Palavalasa Sangam Naidu and Rukminamma were former MLAs of Andhra Pradesh. She married Reddy Nagabhushana Rao, who is an Indian Forest Service officer. Their daughter, Veditha Reddy, is an IAS officer.
