= Kanithi Viswanatham =

Indian politician (1932–2023)

Member of Parliament, Lok Sabha
- In office 1989–1996
- Preceded by: Appayyadora Hanumantu
- Succeeded by: Kinjarapu Yerran Naidu
- Constituency: Srikakulam

Personal details
- Born: 1 July 1932 Haridasapuram, Srikakulam, Madras Presidency, British India (now Andhra Pradesh, India)
- Died: 15 April 2023 (aged 90) Palasa, Andhra Pradesh, India
- Party: Indian National Congress
- Spouse: Lalitha Vishwanatham
- Children: 2

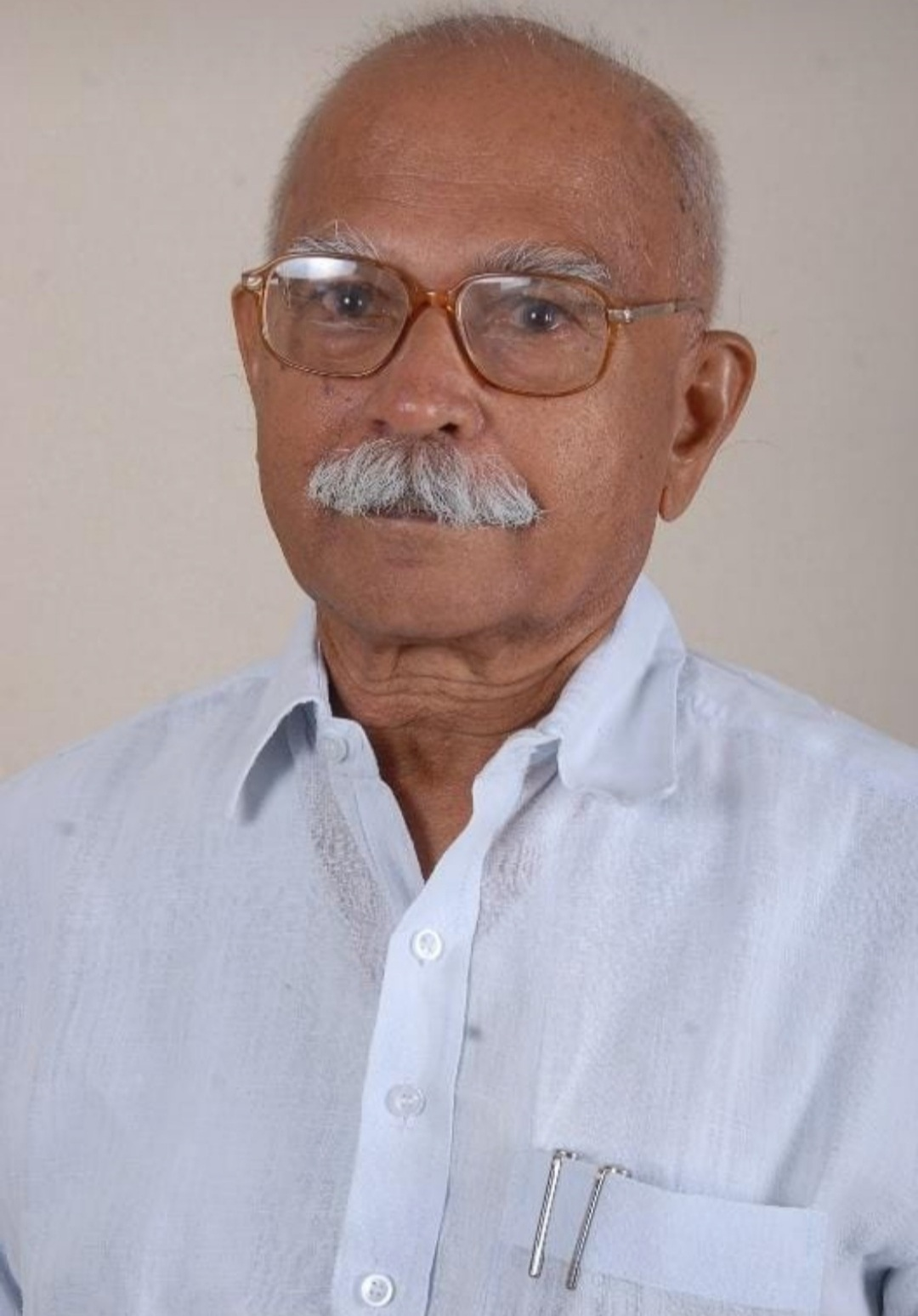

Kanithi Viswanatham (1 July 1932 – 15 April 2023) was an Indian politician belonging to the Indian National Congress. He was elected to the Lok Sabha, the lower house of the Indian Parliament, from Srikakulam, Andhra Pradesh in 1989 and 1991.

== Death ==
Kanithi Viswanatham died in his native district of Srikakulam, Andhra Pradesh on 15 April 2023. He was 90.
