= Goppili =

- village
- Interactive map of Goppili
- Location in Andhra Pradesh, India Goppili (India)
- Coordinates: 18.81°N 84.34°E
- Country: India
- State: Andhra Pradesh
- District: Srikakulam
- Elevation: 42 m (138 ft)

Population (2011)
  - Total: 2,546

Languages
  - Official: Telugu
- Time zone: UTC+5:30 (IST)
- PIN: 532221
- Telephone code: 08945
- Vehicle registration: AP-30

Goppili is a village and panchayat in Meliaputti mandal, Srikakulam district in the state of Andhra Pradesh in India. It is located on the border between Andhra Pradesh and Orissa. The population of this village is 2546, of which 1223 are male and 1323 are female, living in 625 households (2011 census). Residents typically speak Oriya and Telugu.

== Geography ==
The village is located at 18°49'North, 84°21'East. The village is precisely a foot from the Orissa border and is surrounded by lush green hillocks. There are five ponds scattered across the village, whose water is used for daily needs.

== Facilities ==
The facilities available in the village are:

- Two Anganwadi centres
- One Canara bank (Erstwhile Syndicate Bank)
- Two schools: ZPHS (Zilla Parishad High School) and Elementary School (Primary School)
- One veterinary hospital
- Three medical stores, one of them owned by Mr. CH.V. Gunasagar
- There are 5 ponds in the village which are used for daily general purposes and needs, while drinking water is obtained from a well.
- One water reservoir named Varahala Gedda
- One drinking water overhead tank
- Panchayat office of Goppili
- One post office
- One primary health centre
- One Rythu Bharosa centre
- One library

== Temples ==
- Radhakanta Swamy Temple which lies in 26 acres (11 ha) of temple land, main temple area is only 1 acre (0.40 ha).
- Two Lord Shiva Temples
- Two Maa Kali Temple
- Five Ammavari Temples
- Two Hanuman temples

== Crops ==
Sugarcane, Paddy, Raagi, pulses and groundnuts are grown in Goppili. The village is famous for twenty cashew nut factories in and surrounding the village which directly employ 2000 people, including the people from neighbouring villages.

== Employment ==
Almost half of the population of the village is dependent upon agriculture. 50% of the population is employed in agriculture and 35% in business. The rest work for the government or are private employees.

== Sarpanch/Gram Panchayat Head list ==
1st: Late Shri Mallareddi Satyanarayana Dora. In Office (31.10.1956-14.6.1970)

2nd: Late Shri Mallareddi Narayana Rao Dora. In Office (15.6.1970-3.6.1991)

3rd: Shri Mallareddi Markandeya Dora. In Office (4.6.1991-9.3.1995)

4th: Shri Mallareddi Balakrishnamma Dora. (s/o Late Shri Mallareddi Narayana Rao Dora). In Office (10.3.1995-20.10.2001)

5th: K Rajarao. In Office (21.10.2001-13.8.2006)

6th: Mallareddy Padmavati Dora. (w/o Late Shri Mallareddi Narayana Rao Dora). In Office (14.8.2006-21.8.2011)

7th: Malathi Jayaram. In Office (22.8.2011-21.8.2016)

8th: Malathi Rushendramani. In Office (21.8.2016-Incumbent)

The 1st to 4th & 6th Sarpanch represent altogether 44 years of office under relatives of the Goppili Zamindars.
