= Koona Ravi Kumar =

Indian politician

Member of the Andhra Pradesh Legislative Assembly
- Incumbent
- Assumed office 2024
- Preceded by: Thammineni Seetharam
- Constituency: Amadalavalasa

Member of the Andhra Pradesh Legislative Assembly
- In office 2014–2019
- Preceded by: Boddepalli Satyavathi
- Succeeded by: Thammineni Seetharam
- Constituency: Amadalavalasa

Personal details
- Party: Telugu Desam Party

Koona Ravi Kumar is an Indian politician from Andhra Pradesh. He is a member of Telugu Desam Party. He has been elected as the Member of the Legislative Assembly representing the Amadalavalasa Assembly constituency in 2024 Andhra Pradesh Legislative Assembly elections.
