= Tekkali Assembly constituency =

Constituency of the Andhra Pradesh Legislative Assembly, India

Coordinates: 18.61°N 84.23°E

Tekkali
- Constituency No. 3 for the Andhra Pradesh Legislative Assembly
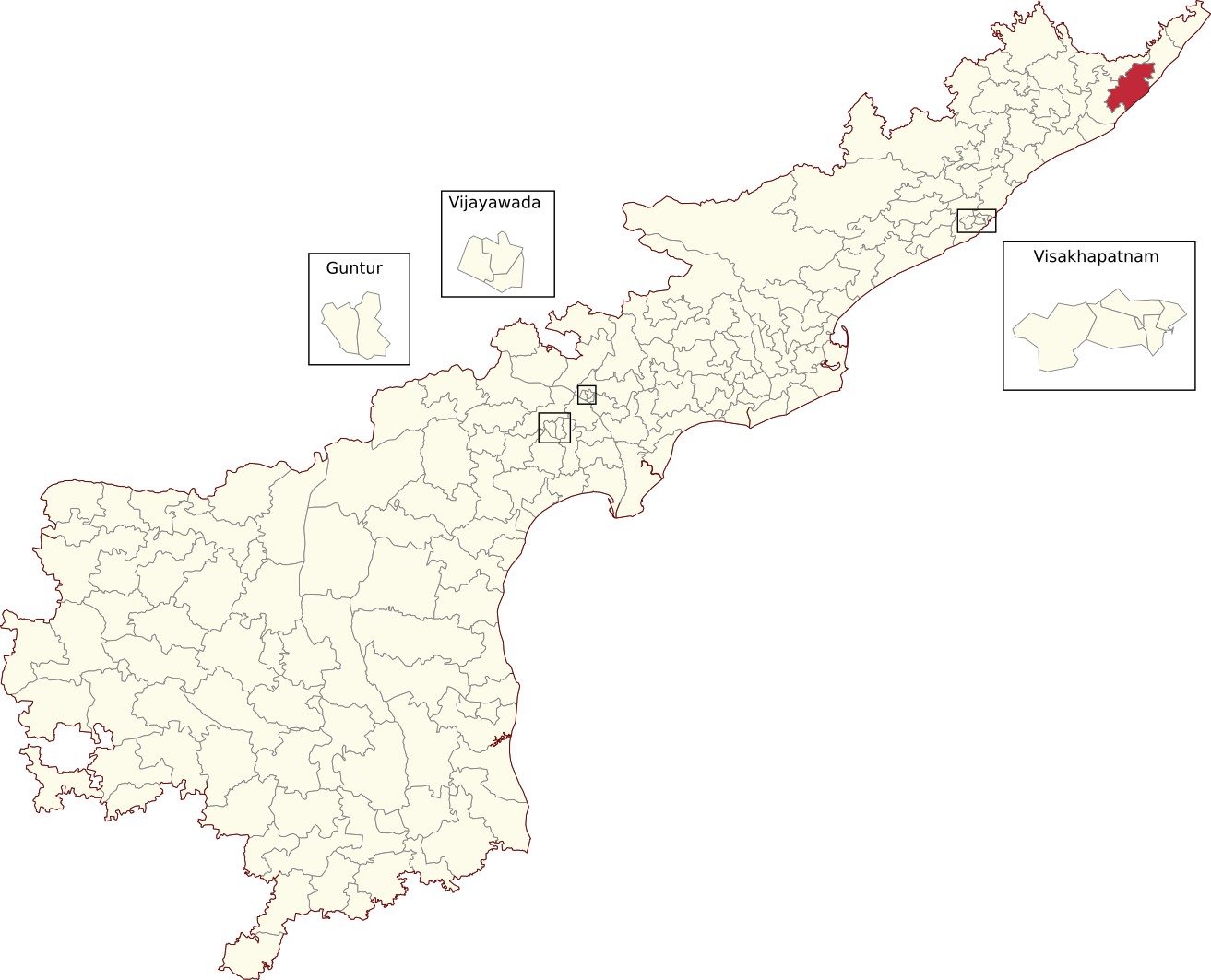
- Location of Tekkali Assembly constituency within Andhra Pradesh

Constituency details
- Country: India
- Region: South India
- State: Andhra Pradesh
- District: Srikakulam
- Lok Sabha constituency: Srikakulam
- Established: 1951
- Total electors: 222,222
- Reservation: None

Member of Legislative Assembly
- 16th Andhra Pradesh Legislative Assembly
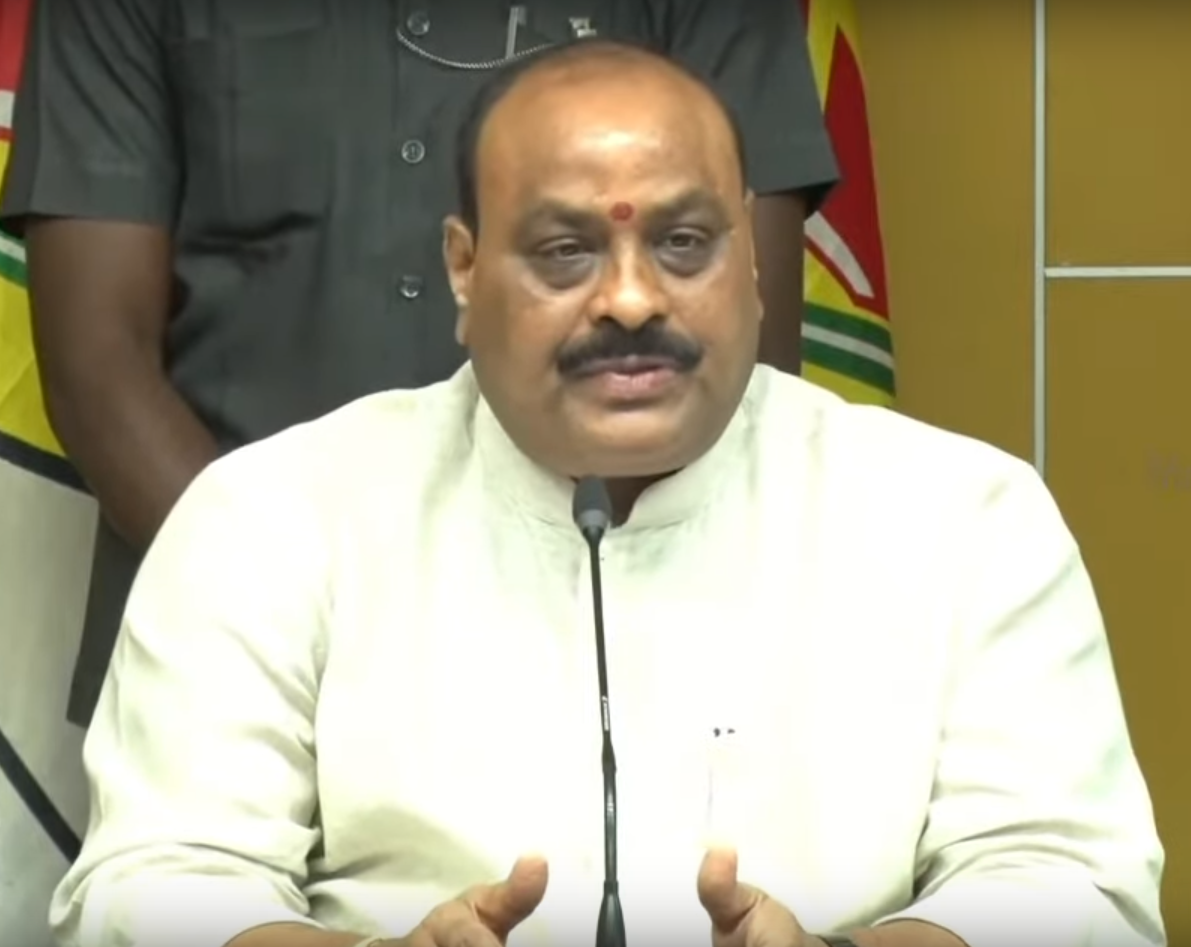
- Incumbent Kinjarapu Atchannaidu
- Party: TDP
- Alliance: NDA
- Elected year: 2024

Tekkali Assembly constituency is a constituency in Srikakulam district of Andhra Pradesh that elects representatives to the Andhra Pradesh Legislative Assembly in India. It is one of the seven assembly segments of Srikakulam Lok Sabha constituency.

Rokkam Lakshmi Narasimham Dora was the first MLA from the constituency. Kinjarapu Atchannaidu is the current MLA of the constituency, having won the 2024 Andhra Pradesh Legislative Assembly election from Telugu Desam Party. As of 2019, there are a total of 222,222 electors in the constituency. The constituency was established in 1951, as per the Delimitation Orders (1951).

== Mandals ==
The four mandals that form the assembly constituency.

Mandals
Nandigam
Tekkali
Santha Bommali
Kotabommali

Mandals in Tekkali Assembly constituency

== Members of the Legislative Assembly ==
Year	Member	Political party
1952	Rokkam Lakshmi Narasimham Dora	Independent
1955	Rokkam Lakshmi Narasimham Dora	Indian National Congress
1962	Ronanki Satyanarayana	Swatantra Party
1967	N. Ramulu	Swatantra Party
1972	Sattaru Lokanadham Naidu	Indian National Congress
1978	Bammaidi Narayanaswami	Janata Party
1983	Attada Janardhana Rao	Telugu Desam Party
1985	Saroja Varada	Telugu Desam Party
1989	Duvvada Nagavali	Telugu Desam Party
1994	N. T. Rama Rao	Telugu Desam Party
1995 by-election	Appayya Dora Hanumanthu	Telugu Desam Party
1999	Korla Revatipathi	Telugu Desam Party
2004	Appayya Dora Hanumanthu	Indian National Congress
2009	Korla Revatipathi	Indian National Congress
2009 by-election	Korla Bharathi	Indian National Congress
2014	Kinjarapu Atchannaidu	Telugu Desam Party
2019	Kinjarapu Atchannaidu	Telugu Desam Party
2024	Kinjarapu Atchannaidu	Telugu Desam Party

== Election results ==
=== 2024 ===
2024 Andhra Pradesh Legislative Assembly election: Tekkali
Party	Candidate	Votes	%	±%
TDP	Kinjarapu Atchannaidu	107,923	45.11	▲6.13
YSRCP	Duvvada Srinivas	73,488	30.72	▼4.46
	Remaining	4,960	2.07	▲0.26
NOTA	None of the above	3,682	1.54	▲0.23
Turnout		1,90,053	79.44	▲0.91
Registered electors		2,39,246		
Majority		34,435	14.39	
TDP hold		Swing		

=== 2019 ===
2019 Andhra Pradesh Legislative Assembly election: Tekkali
Party	Candidate	Votes	%	±%
TDP	Kinjarapu Atchannaidu	87,658	38.98	▼0.47
YSRCP	Perada Tilak	79,113	35.18	▼0.19
JSP	Kaniti Kiran Kumar	2,806	1.25	New
	Remaining	4,071	1.81	−−
NOTA	None of the above	2,935	1.31	▲0.89
Turnout		1,76,583	78.53	▲0.57
Registered electors		2,24,852		
Majority		8,545	3.8	
TDP hold		Swing		

=== 2014 ===
2014 Andhra Pradesh Legislative Assembly election: Tekkali
Party	Candidate	Votes	%	±%
TDP	Kinjarapu Atchannaidu	81,167	39.45	
YSRCP	Duvvada Srinivas	72,780	35.37	New
INC	Killi Rammohana Rao	1,849	0.91	
	Remaining	3,727	1.81	
NOTA	None of the above	871	0.42	
Turnout		1,60,394	77.96	
Registered electors		2,05,744		
Majority		8,387	4.08	
TDP gain from INC		Swing		

=== 2009 ===
2009 Andhra Pradesh Legislative Assembly election: Tekkali
Party	Candidate	Votes	%	±%
INC	Dr. Revatipathi Korla	47,513	34.8	▼12.9
TDP	Kinjarapu Atchannaidu	45,620	33.4	▲2.3
PRP	Duvvada Srinivas	36,552	26.8	New
Majority		1,893	1.4	▼15.3
Turnout		136,450	76.0	▲3.0
INC hold		Swing	▼7.6	

=== 2004 ===
2004 Andhra Pradesh Legislative Assembly election: Tekkali
Party	Candidate	Votes	%	±%
INC	A. D. Hanumanthu	49,480	47.7	▲2.1
TDP	L. L. Naidu	32,209	31.1	▼21.0
Majority		17,271	16.7	▲10.4
Turnout		1,03,491	73.0	▲6.7
INC gain from TDP		Swing	▲11.55	

=== 1999 ===
2024 Andhra Pradesh Legislative Assembly election: Tekkali
Party	Candidate	Votes	%	±%
TDP	Korla Revatipathi	49,012	52.1	−18.8
INC	Hanumantu Appayyadora	42,960	45.6	▲18.5
Anna Telugu Desam Party	Koneru Adinarayanarao	1,941	2.1	New
Bahujan Republican Party	Bibi Rashida	215	0.2	
Majority		6,052	6.5	−37.3
Turnout		96,680	66.3	−4.1
TDP hold		Swing		

=== 1994 ===
1994 Andhra Pradesh Legislative Assembly election: Tekkali
Party	Candidate	Votes	%	±%
TDP	N.T. Rama Rao	66,200	70.9	+19.3
INC	Baburao Vajja	25,310	27.1	▼15.8
Anna Bharatiya Janta Party	B.B. Subhash	697	0.8	New
BSP	Kambala Rao	697	0.8	
Independent	Kaviti Syamu	332	0.4	
Independent	Laxminarayana Pandrati	168	0.2	
Majority		40,890	43.8	+35.1
Turnout		95,105	70.4	+1.5
TDP hold		Swing		

=== 1989 ===
1989 Andhra Pradesh Legislative Assembly election: Tekkali
Party	Candidate	Votes	%	±%
TDP	Duvvada Nagavali	44,272	51.6%	−9.1
INC	Sattaru Lokanadham	36,838	42.9%	+13%
Independent	Bammidi Narayanaswamy	3,817	4.5%	
Independent	Penta Murty	550	0.6%	
Independent	Koneru Rao	364	0.4%	
Margin of victory		7,434	8.3%	−22
Turnout		66,392	68.9%	+0.9
Registered electors		129,667		+24,929
TDP hold		Swing		

=== 1985 ===
1985 Andhra Pradesh Legislative Assembly election: Tekkali
Party	Candidate	Votes	%	±%
TDP	Saroja Varada	42,487	60.7	
INC	Duvvada Ramarao	20,916	29.9	▲5.1
LKD	Jeevanrao Tamare	2,767	4.0	▼14.9
Independent	Attada Janardhanarao	2,29	3.0	
Independent	Korlapu Mallesu	777	1.1	
Independent	Ambati Bhoolokam	645	0.9	
Independent	Reyyi Jayamma	316	0.5	
Majority		21,571	30.3	−0.8
Turnout		71,236	68.0	+0.6
TDP hold		Swing		

=== 1983 ===
1983 Andhra Pradesh Legislative Assembly election: Tekkali
Party	Candidate	Votes	%	±%
TDP	Attada Rao	35,274	56.3	
INC	Lokanadham Sattaru	15,558	24.8	▼8.9
LKD	Bammidi Narayamaswamy	11,846	18.9	New
Majority		19,716	30.8	▲10.9
Turnout		63,949	67.4	▼8.3
INC hold		Swing		

=== 1978 ===
1978 Andhra Pradesh Legislative Assembly election: Tekkali
Party	Candidate	Votes	%	±%
JP	Bammaidi Narayanaswami	36,206	54.3	
INC	Satharu Naidu	22,502	33.7	▼24.28
INC	Hussana Begam	7,998	12.0	New
Majority		13,704	19.9	▼8.61
Turnout		68,871	75.7	▲12.31
JP gain from INC		Swing		

=== 1972 ===
1972 Andhra Pradesh Legislative Assembly election: Tekkali
Party	Candidate	Votes	%	±%
INC	Sattaru Naidu	29,502	57.98	+33.17
SWA	Suggu Rao	14,998	29.47	−14.15
Independent	D. Naidu	4,881	9.59	
Independent	Bompaili Ramanna	1,503	2.395	
Majority		14,504	28.51	+9.7
Turnout		50,884	63.39	−2.06
INC gain from SWA		Swing		

=== 1967 ===
1967 Andhra Pradesh Legislative Assembly election: Tekkali
Party	Candidate	Votes	%	±%
SWA	N. Ramulu	20,749	43.62	−18.48
INC	B. Lakshminarayanamma	11,802	24.81	−13.08
Independent	Y. Viswanatham	7,873	16.55	
Independent	B.M. Reddi	7,146	15.02	
Majority		8,947	18.81	−5.4
Turnout		47,570	65.45	
SWA hold		Swing		

=== 1962 ===
1962 Andhra Pradesh Legislative Assembly election: Tekkali
Party	Candidate	Votes	%	±%
SWA	Ronanki Satyanarayana	23,588	62.10	N/A
INC	Rokkam Lakshmi Narasimham Dora	14,390	37.89	▲4.51
Majority		9,198	24.21	▲22.62
Turnout		37,978		
SWA gain from INC		Swing		

=== 1955 ===
1955 Andhra State Legislative Assembly election: Tekkali
Party	Candidate	Votes	%	±%
INC	Rokkam Lakshmi Narasimham Dora	11,252	33.38%	+5.53
Independent	Bandi Kurmanna	10,716	31.79%	+5.42%
CPI	Mosalikanti Venkararamadasu	3,949	11.72%	−4.6
Independent	Dukka Reddy	3,519	10.44%	
Independent	Hanumanta Dora	2,902	8.61%	
Independent	Garimella Ramanamurty	1,369	4.06%	
Margin of victory		536	1.59%	+0.11
Turnout		33,707	54.27%	+0.81
Registered electors		62,108		+912

=== 1952 ===
1952 Madras State Legislative Assembly election: Tekkali
Party	Candidate	Votes	%	±%
Independent	Rokkam Lakshmi Narasimham Dora	9,113	27.85%	
INC	Bandi Kurmanna	8,628	26.37%	26.37%
KLP	Attada Krishnamurthi	6,795	20.77%	
CPI	Bandalam Gavrayya	5,341	16.32%	
KMPP	Prabas Chandra Sathapathi	2,840	8.68%	
Margin of victory		485	1.48%	
Turnout		32,717	53.46%	
Registered electors		61,196		
Independent win (new seat)				

== See also ==
- List of constituencies of the Andhra Pradesh Legislative Assembly
