= Pathapatnam =

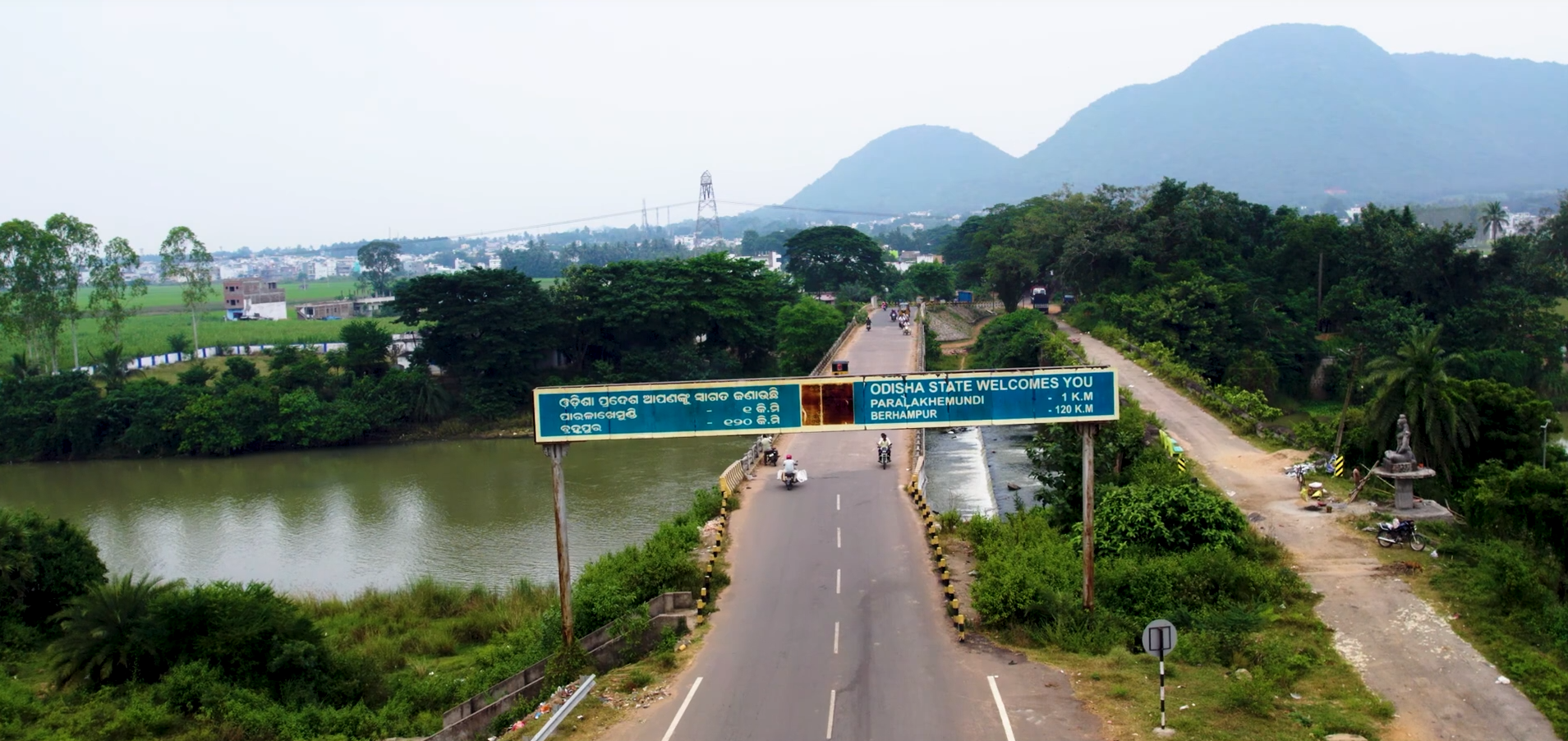
- The bridge over Mahendratanaya river connecting Pathapatnam and Parlakhemundi

- Location in Andhra Pradesh, India
- Coordinates: 18.7500°N 84.0833°E
- Country: India
- State: Andhra Pradesh
- District: Srikakulam
- Talukas: Pathapatnam

Government
  - MLA: Mamidi Govinda Rao

Area
  - Total: 4.92 km^{2} (1.90 sq mi)

Population (2011)
  - Total: 15,954
  - Density: 3,240/km^{2} (8,400/sq mi)

Languages
  - Official: Telugu
- Time zone: UTC+5:30 (IST)
- PIN: 532213
- Telephone code: 08946
- Vehicle Registration: AP30 (Former); AP39 (from 30 January 2019)
- Lok Sabha constituency: Srikakulam
- Vidhan Sabha constituency: Pathapatnam

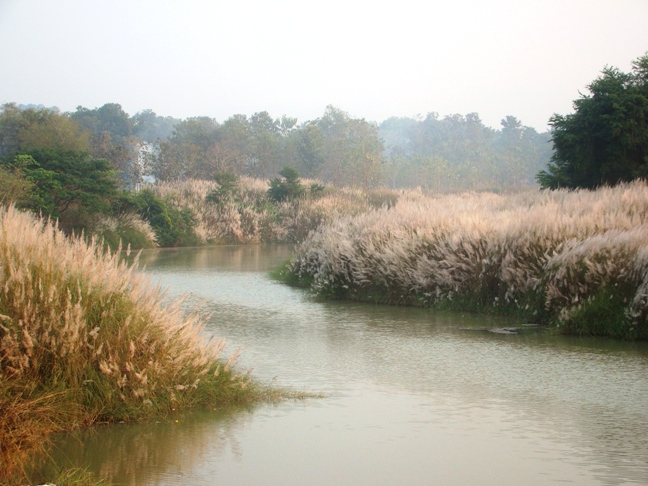
Pathapatnam is located on the banks of Mahendratanaya River

Pathapatnam is a town in Srikakulam district of the Indian state of Andhra Pradesh. It is located in Pathapatnam mandal of Tekkali revenue division. Pathapatnam is located on the border of Srikakulam district of Andhra Pradesh and Gajapati district of Odisha. Parlakhemundi, the headquarters of Gajapati District, can be considered as twin town of Pathapatnam because of its close proximity. It is located around 65 km from srikakulam. It was the old capital of Paralakhemundi Gajapati Maharajah of his erstwhile kingdom.

== Geography ==
Pathapatnam is located at 18.7500°N 84.0833°E.It has an average elevation of 82 meters (272 feet). It is located on the banks of Mahendratanaya River which is a tributary of Vamsadhara River.

== Demographics ==
Pathapatnam is a town located in Pathapatnam mandal of Srikakulam district, Andhra Pradesh with total 3797 families residing. The Pathapatnam village has population of 15954 of which 7919 are males while 8035 are females as per Population Census 2011.

In Pathapatnam village population of children with age 0-6 is 1468 which makes up 9.20% of total population of village. Average Sex Ratio of Pathapatnam village is 1015 which is higher than Andhra Pradesh state average of 993. Child Sex Ratio for the Pathapatnam as per census is 955, higher than Andhra Pradesh average of 939.

Pathapatnam village has higher literacy rate compared to Andhra Pradesh. In 2011, literacy rate of Pathapatnam village was 78.57% compared to 67.02% of Andhra Pradesh. In Pathapatnam Male literacy stands at 85.24% while female literacy rate was 72.04%.

As per constitution of India and Panchyati Raaj Act, Pathapatnam village is administrated by Sarpanch (Head of Village) who is elected representative of village.

== Transport ==
National Highway 326A (India) Connects Pathapatnam town. State Highways 96 and 93 are connected to pathapatnam town from Tekkali and meliyaputti mandals.

Pathapatnam town is connected to Tekkali and Meliyaputti mandals.

Pathapatnam can be reached by train via the Naupada-Gunupur branch line. The railway station is Pathapatnam (PHM) station of East Coast Railway Zone. It is connected to Howrah-Chennai main line. There are plenty of buses say every 15 minutes from district headquarters srikakulam

Pathapatnam is connected by APSRTC busses, from Palasa, Tekkali and from Srikakulam bus stations. More than 70 ordinary bus services runs by APSRTC, to this town from Palasa, Tekkali, Srikakulam, Hiramandalam.

APSRTC running Express busses services from Anakapalli to Paralakhemundi, by connecting Pathapatnam.

== Assembly constituency ==
Pathapatnam is an assembly constituency in Andhra Pradesh. There are 1,27,757 registered voters in this constituency in 1999 elections. It consists of 5 mandals.

1. Pathapatnam
2. Hiramandalam
3. Meliaputti
4. Lakshminarasupeta
5. Kothuru

List of Elected Members:

Year	Winner Candidate	Party	Votes	Runner Candidate	Party	Votes	Margin (Majority)
2004	Kalamata Mohanrao	TDP	44,357	Gorle Haribabu Naidu	INC	42,293	2,064
2009	Satrucharla Vijaya Rama Raju	INC	58936	Kalamata Venkata Ramana	TDP	38146	20790

- 1951 - Mandangi Pentananaidu
- 1967 - P. Gunnayya
- 1972 - Chukka pagadalamma (INC)
- 1983 - Tota Tulasida Naidu
- 1985 - Dharmana Narayana Rao
- 1996 - Lakshmi parvathi
- 1978, 1989, 1994, 1999 and 2004 - Kalamata Mohana Rao
- 2009 - Satrucharla Vijaya Rama Raju
- for the first time an educationist got nearly 1200 votes as a representative of a professional and high ideological party, loksatta.
- 2014- 2019 : Kalamata venkata Ramana (won in Ycp and moved to TDP)
- 2019- 2024 : Reddy Santhi ( Ycp)
- 2024 onwards : Mamidi Govinda Rao (TDP)
