= Nimmada =

Village in Andhra Pradesh, India

- Village
- View of Nimmada village
- Interactive map of Nimmada
- Location in Andhra Pradesh, India Nimmada (India)
- Coordinates: 18.4527°N 84.1247°E
- Country: India
- State: Andhra Pradesh
- District: Srikakulam
- Elevation: 29.26 m (96.0 ft)

Population (2001)
  - Total: 2,811

Languages
  - Official: Telugu
- Time zone: UTC+5:30 (IST)
- PIN: 532 430

Nimmada is a village and panchayat in Kotabommali Mandal, Srikakulam District, Andhra Pradesh, India. It is located approximately 30 km (19 mi) north of Srikakulam town near the sea. It comes under Tekkali assembly constituency.

== Geography ==
Nimmada is located at 18°27′9.72″N 84°7′28.92″E and at an altitude of 29.2 metres (96 ft).

== Demographics ==
According to Indian census, 2001, the demographic details of Nimmada village is as follows:

- Total population: 2,811 in 592 households
- Male population: 1,484
- Female population: 1,327
- Children under 6-years of age: 316 (boys - 161 and girls - 155)
- Total literates: 1,383

== Politics ==
It is one of the prominent villages in Kotabommali Mandal as it is the hometown of three important political leaders.
1. Krishna Murthy Kinjarapu - He became the MLA for Harishchandrapuram assembly constituency in 1964.
2. Yerrannaidu Kinjarapu - He was the MLA for Harishchandrapuram assembly constituency from 1982 to 1996, then he went on to become the Member of Parliament, Srikakulam District(1996–2009).
3. Atchanna Naidu Kinjarapu - Elected MLA for Harishchandrapuram assembly constituency since 1996 to 2009.And MLA for Tekkali Assembly constituency. He is the younger brother of Yerrannaidu Kinjarapu

== Education ==
There are three Mandal Parishad (M.P.) primary schools and one Zilla Parishad (Z.P.) high school. M.P.Primary School, Z.P.High School.
