= Gouthu Sireesha =

Indian politician (born 1980)

Member of Legislative Assembly, Andhra Pradesh
- Incumbent
- Assumed office 2024
- Preceded by: Seediri Appalaraju
- Constituency: Palasa

Personal details
- Born: 1980 (age 45–46)
- Party: Telugu Desam Party
- Parent: Gouthu Syam Sunder Sivaji (father)
- Relatives: Gouthu Latchanna (grand father)

Gouthu Sireesha (born 1980) is an Indian politician from Andhra Pradesh. She is a first-time member of the Andhra Pradesh Legislative Assembly from Palasa constituency of Srikakulam district. She represents Telugu Desam Party and won the 2024 Andhra Pradesh Legislative Assembly election. She is the daughter of former legislator Gouthu Syam Sunder Sivaji and grand daughter of freedom fighter and former legislator Gouthu Latchanna.

== Early life and education ==
Sireesha was born in Palasa. She married Yarlagadda Venkanna Choudary. She runs her own business. She did her bachelor's degree in Law at NBM Law College which is affiliated with Andhra University in 2015. After BL, she did Masters of Business Administration in 1996 at Pydah College, also with Andhra University. She belongs to backward class, hailing from Sri Sayana community. She is born to former minister Gouthu Shyam Sundar Sivaji and is a granddaughter of freedom fighter Gouthu Latchanna.

== Career ==
Sireesha made her electoral debut in 2019 but lost the 2019 Andhra Pradesh Legislative Assembly election contesting on TDP ticket to Appalaraju Seediri. But she won the 2024 Andhra Pradesh Legislative Assembly election from Palasa Assembly constituency which was earlier represented by her father twice. Representing Telugu Desam Party, she defeated Appalaraju Seediri of YSRCP by a margin of 40,350 votes.
