= Akkulapeta =

- Village
- Interactive map of Akkulapeta
- Location in Andhra Pradesh, India Akkulapeta (India)
- Coordinates: 18°24′18.09″N 83°54′06.84″E
- Country: India
- State: Andhra Pradesh
- District: Srikakulam

Languages
  - Official: Telugu
- Time zone: UTC+5:30 (IST)
- PIN: 532 185
- Telephone code: 08942
- Vehicle Registration: AP30 (Former); AP39 (from 30 January 2019)

Akkulapeta is a village in Srikakulam district of the Indian state of Andhra Pradesh. It is located in Amudalavalasa mandal.

== Demographics ==
According to Indian census, 2001, the demographic details of this village is as follows:

- Total Population: 760 in 187 Households.
- Male Population: 369
- Female Population: 391
- Children Under 6-years: 80 (Boys - 38 and Girls - 42)
- Total Literates: 472
