= Akkupalli =

- Village
- Interactive map of Akkupalli
- Location in Andhra Pradesh, India Akkupalli (India)
- Coordinates: 18.751472°N 84.487172°E
- Country: India
- State: Andhra Pradesh
- District: Srikakulam

Government
  - Type: Gram Panchayat

Population
  - Total: 2,252

Languages
  - Official: Telugu
- Time zone: UTC+5:30 (IST)
- PIN: 532219
- Vehicle Registration: AP30 (Former); AP39 (from 30 January 2019)

Akkupalli is a village in Srikakulam district of the Indian state of Andhra Pradesh. It is located in Vajrapukotturu mandal.

== Demographics ==
Akkupalli village has population of 2,252 of which 1,064 are males while 1,188 are females as per Population 2011, Indian Census.

== Tourism ==
Akkupalli village is home to the popular Akkupalli Beach.
