= Kinjarapu Yerran Naidu =

Indian politician (1957–2012)

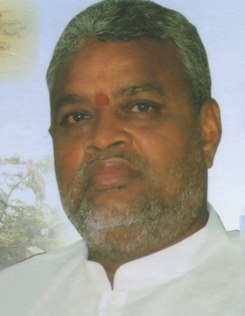

Union Minister of Rural Areas and Employment
- In office 1 June 1996 – 19 March 1998
- Prime Minister: H. D. Deve Gowda; I. K. Gujral
- Preceded by: Atal Bihari Vajpayee
- Succeeded by: Babagouda Patil

Member of Parliament, Lok Sabha
- In office 10 May 1996 – 17 May 2009
- Preceded by: Kanithi Viswanatham
- Succeeded by: Killi Krupa Rani
- Constituency: Srikakulam

State Cabinet Minister, Andhra Pradesh
- In office 8 October 1995 – 11 October 1995
- Governor: Krishan Kant; C. Rangarajan
- Chief Minister: N. Chandrababu Naidu

Member of Legislative Assembly, Andhra Pradesh
- In office 1983–1996
- Preceded by: Kannipally Appla Narasimha Bhuktha
- Succeeded by: Kinjarapu Atchannaidu
- Constituency: Harishchandrapuram

Personal details
- Born: 23 February 1957 Nimmada, Andhra Pradesh
- Died: 2 November 2012 (aged 55) Ranasthalam, Andhra Pradesh
- Party: Telugu Desam Party
- Spouse: Kinjarapu Vijaya Kumari
- Relations: Kinjarapu Atchannaidu (brother)
- Children: Kinjarapu Ram Mohan Naidu (son); Adireddy Bhavani (daughter)
- Parent(s): K. Dali Naidu, K. Kalavathamma
- Website: http://www.kinjarapu.com

Kinjarapu Yerran Naidu (23 February 1957 – 2 November 2012) was an Indian politician from Andhra Pradesh. He served as the Union Minister in H. D. Deve Gowda and I. K. Gujral Cabinets. Formerly, he was the Legislator of Andhra Pradesh, won four times from the Harishchandrapuram. Further, he contested successfully from Srikakulam Parliament four times.

== Early life ==
Yerran Naidu was born on 23 February 1957, in a Velama family in Nimmada, a remote village in the Srikakulam district of Andhra Pradesh. He has a brother, Kinjarapu Atchannaidu, who is also a politician. He has a son Kinjarapu Ram Mohan Naidu, who is also a politician.

== Career ==
Naidu obtained a law degree with first division from the Andhra University in Visakhapatnam, and joined the Telugu Desam Party (TDP) in 1982 when it was formed by popular Telugu cinema actor N. T. Rama Rao.

In 1983, Naidu was elected to the state assembly from Harishchandrapuram in his native district at the age of 25, becoming one of the youngest Members of the Legislative Assembly(MLA). He was re-elected in 1985. Denied a TDP ticket in 1989, he fought as an independent and was re-elected to the assembly. He later returned to the party fold and was elected for the fourth consecutive term in 1994.

He backed N. Chandrababu Naidu when the latter led a revolt against N.T. Rama Rao and became a minister in 1995. He was the Government Chief Whip from 1995 to 1996.

Popularly known as Yeranna among TDP circles, Naidu was fielded by the party in the 1996 Indian general election in Andhra Pradesh. Elected to the Lok Sabha from the Srikakulam constituency, he emerged as a key TDP leader in national politics. With the TDP joining the United Front Government, Naidu became a minister at the centre, holding the portfolio of Rural Development and Employment.

He retained the Lok Sabha seat in the 1998 and 1999 elections. Two days before polling in the 2004 elections, he survived an assassination bid by Naxalites (Maoist Communists) who attempted to bomb his vehicle in Singupuram town in Srikakulam district. Re-elected to parliament, he was made the party leader in the Lok Sabha.

In the 2009 elections, Naidu was defeated by the Congress party's Killi Krupa Rani, who was inducted into the Union ministry on 28 October 2012.

== Electoral History ==
=== Lok Sabha ===
Year	Constituency	Party	Votes	%	Opponent	Party	Votes	%	Result	Margin	%
1991	Srikakulam	IND	83,292	15.06	Viswanatham Kanithi	INC	2,35,641	42.60	Lost	-1,52,349	-27.54
1996	Srikakulam	TDP	2,34,278	36.82	Jaya Krishna Mandamuri	NTDP	1,99,700	31.38	Won	+34,578	+5.44
1998	Srikakulam	TDP	2,86,582	43.14	Appayya Dora Hanumanthu	NTDP	2,00,217	30.14	Won	+86,365	+13.00
1999	Srikakulam	TDP	3,73,851	56.81	Kanithi Viswanadham	INC	2,76,969	42.09	Won	+96,882	+14.72
2004	Srikakulam	TDP	3,61,906	50.00	Killi Kruparani	INC	3,30,027	45.60	Won	+31,879	+4.40
2009	Srikakulam	TDP	3,04,707	33.16	Killi Krupa Rani	INC	3,87,694	42.20	Lost	-82,987	-9.04

== Death ==
Naidu died from a heart attack after a car accident in his native district Srikakulam, Andhra Pradesh around 2:00 am of 2 November 2012 while returning from a marriage ceremony at Visakhapatnam.The incident took place when a car in which he was travelling was hit by an oil tanker from behind near Ranasthalam in Srikakulam district in north coastal Andhra, about 25 km from Srikakulam. A severely-injured Naidu was transported to Krishna Institute of Medical Sciences (KIMS) in Srikakulam town, where the doctors' efforts to resuscitate him failed. He was declared dead around 3:30 am.
