= Seediri Appalaraju =

Indian politician (born 1981)

Minister of Animal Husbandry, Fisheries and Dairy Development Government of Andhra Pradesh
- In office 22 July 2020 – 12 June 2024
- Governor: Biswabhusan Harichandan; S. Abdul Nazeer
- Chief Minister: Y. S. Jagan Mohan Reddy
- Preceded by: Mopidevi Venkataramana
- Succeeded by: Kinjarapu Atchannaidu

Member of Legislative Assembly Andhra Pradesh
- In office 2019–2024
- Preceded by: Syam Sunder Sivaji Gouthu
- Succeeded by: Gouthu Sireesha
- Constituency: Palasa

Personal details
- Born: 1981 (age 44–45) Vajrapu Kotturu
- Party: YSR Congress Party

Seediri Appalaraju (born 22 February 1981) is an Indian politician from the state of Andhra Pradesh. He belongs to the YSRCP. He is former Minister of Andhra Pradesh for Animal Husbandry. He is also the former Minister of Fisheries & Dairy Development.

== Assembly elections 2019 ==
2019 Andhra Pradesh Legislative Assembly election: Palasa
Party	Candidate	Votes	%	±%
YSRCP	Seediri Appalaraju	76,603	51.9	▲13.7
TDP	Gouthu Sireesha	60,356	40.9	▼10.1
JSP	Kotha Purnachandra Rao	6,133	4.2	New
BJP	Korrayi Balakrishna Yadav	1,574	1.1	New
INC	Majji Sharada	1,255	0.9	▼0.5
Majority		16,247	11.0	▼1.8
Turnout		1,47,647	72.9	▼1.1
YSRCP gain from TDP		Swing	▲11.9	
