= Thammineni Seetharam =

Indian politician

Tammineni Seetharam
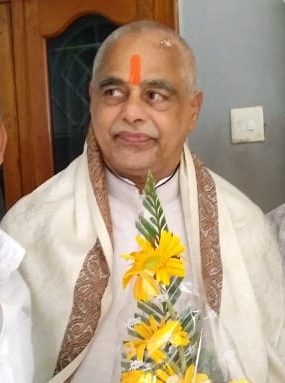
- Tammineni Seetharam

20th Speaker of the Andhra Pradesh Legislative Assembly
- In office 13 June 2019 – 21 June 2024
- Deputy: Kona Raghupathi; Kolagatla Veerabhadra Swamy
- Chief Minister: Y. S. Jagan Mohan Reddy
- Preceded by: Kodela Siva Prasada Rao
- Succeeded by: Chintakayala Ayyanna Patrudu
- Constituency: Amadalavalasa

Minister of Law and justice, Stamps and Registrations and Municipal administration Government of Andhra Pradesh
- In office 22 October 1999 – 13 May 2004
- Governor: C. Rangarajan; Surjit Singh Barnala
- Chief Minister: N. Chandrababu Naidu
- Preceded by: Tulla Devender Goud
- Succeeded by: Dharmana Prasada Rao

Member of Legislative Assembly Andhra Pradesh
- In office 2019 – 4 June 2024
- Preceded by: Kuna Ravi Kumar
- Succeeded by: Kuna Ravi Kumar
- Constituency: Amadalavalasa
- In office 1994–2004
- Preceded by: Pydi Sreerama Murty
- Succeeded by: Boddepalli Satyavathi
- Constituency: Amadalavalasa
- In office 1983–1989
- Preceded by: Pydi Sreerama Murty
- Succeeded by: Pydi Sreerama Murty
- Constituency: Amadalavalasa

Personal details
- Born: 10 June 1955 (age 70) Thogaram
- Party: YSR Congress Party (2013- present)
- Other political affiliations: Praja Rajyam Party (2009-2012); Telugu Desam Party (2012-2013) (1983-2009)

Tammineni Seetharam is an Indian politician from the YSR Congress Party. He previously served as the speaker of the Andhra Pradesh Legislative Assembly from May 2019 to 2024.

== Political career ==
Tammineni Seethaaram is a discontinued graduate in arts and is a senior leader. His political entry started with Telugu Desam Party and was elected as MLA, 6 times (by election), from Amudalavalasa constituency. He served as a minister for three terms, for law and justice, sports, stamps and registrations, excise and municipal administration.

In 2009, Sitaram joined Praja Rajyam Party after resigning from TDP. He lost the election contesting with PRP. Later after dissolution of PRP, he re-joined TDP in 2012, but was unable to adjust in the party. He joined YSR Congress Party in 2013 and contested as an MLA from Amudalavalasa constituency in 2014, but was defeated by TDP candidate K Ravi Kumar.

Sitaram belongs to Kalinga community, which has a dominant vote strength in the Srikakulam parliamentary constituency. Sitaram is the fourth Speaker from Srikakulam district. RLN Dora was the first speaker, Tangi Satyam was the second Speaker and K Pratibha Bharati was the third Speaker from Srikakulam district.
