= Amadalavalasa Assembly constituency =

Constituency of the Andhra Pradesh Legislative Assembly, India

Coordinates: 18.55°N 83.72°E

Amadalavalasa
- Constituency No. 6 for the Andhra Pradesh Legislative Assembly
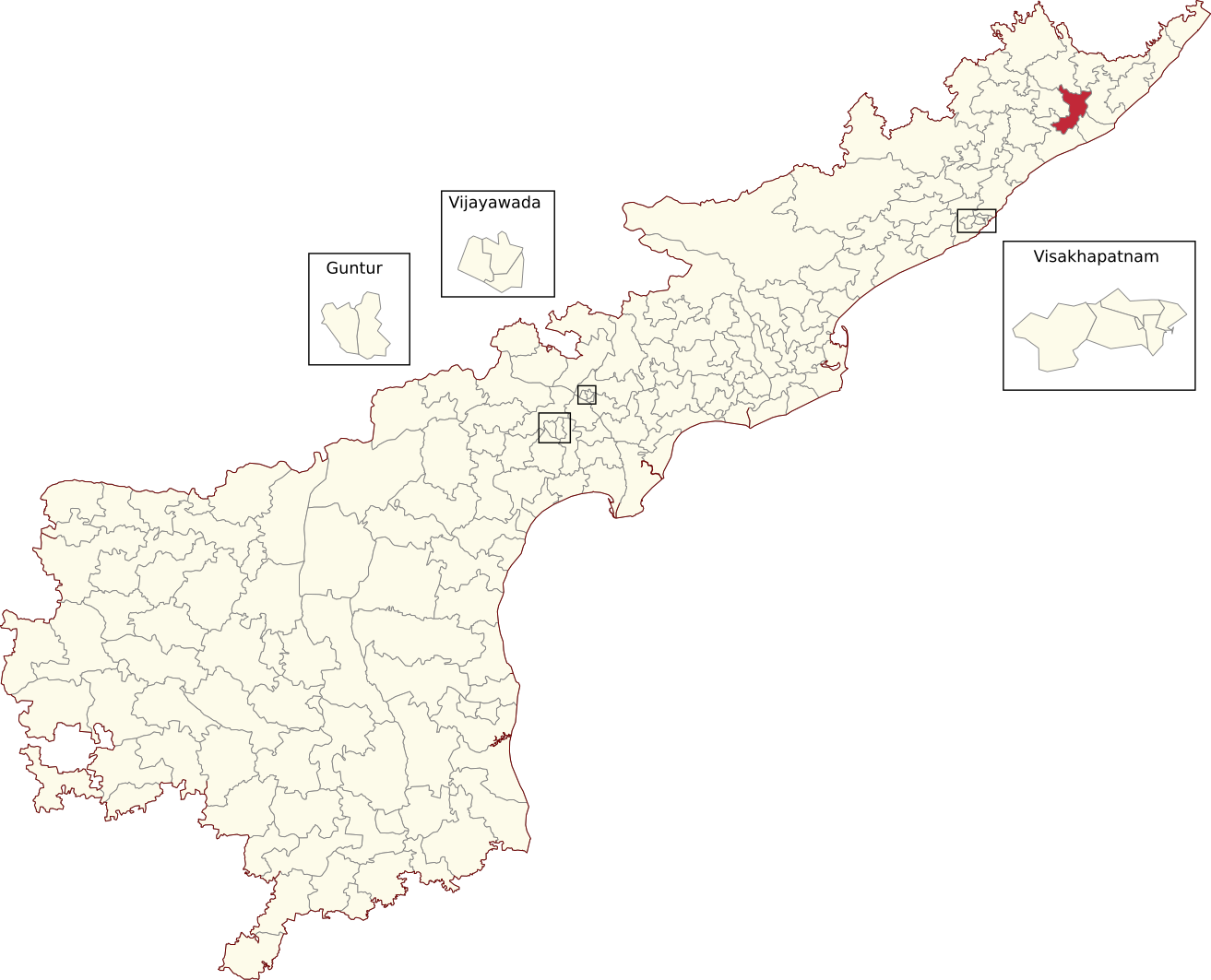
- Location of Srikakulam Assembly constituency within Andhra Pradesh

Constituency details
- Country: India
- Region: South India
- State: Andhra Pradesh
- District: Srikakulam
- Lok Sabha constituency: Srikakulam
- Established: 1976
- Total electors: 187,744
- Reservation: None

Member of Legislative Assembly
- 16th Andhra Pradesh Legislative Assembly
- Incumbent Koona Ravi Kumar
- Party: TDP
- Alliance: NDA
- Elected year: 2024

Amadalavalasa Assembly constituency is a constituency in Srikakulam district of Andhra Pradesh that elects representatives to the Andhra Pradesh Legislative Assembly in India. It is one of the seven assembly segments of Srikakulam Lok Sabha constituency.

Koona Ravi Kumar is the current MLA of the constituency, having won the 2024 Andhra Pradesh Legislative Assembly election from Telugu Desam Party. As of 2019, there are a total of 187,744 electors in the constituency. The constituency was established in 1976, as per the Delimitation Orders (1976).

== Mandals ==
The four mandals that form the assembly constituency are:

Mandal
Amudalavalasa
Ponduru
Sarubujjili
Burja

Mandals in Amadalavalasa Assembly Constituency

== Members of the Legislative Assembly ==
Year	Member	Political party
1978	Pydi Sreerama Murty	Indian National Congress
1983	Thammineni Seetharam	Telugu Desam Party
1985	Thammineni Seetharam	Telugu Desam Party
1989	Pydi Sreerama Murty	Indian National Congress
1994	Thammineni Seetharam	Telugu Desam Party
1999	Thammineni Seetharam	Telugu Desam Party
2004	Boddepalli Satyavathi	Indian National Congress
2009	Boddepalli Satyavathi	Indian National Congress
2014	Koona Ravi Kumar	Telugu Desam Party
2019	Thammineni Seetharam	YSR Congress Party
2024	Koona Ravi Kumar	Telugu Desam Party

== Election results ==
=== 2024 ===
2024 Andhra Pradesh Legislative Assembly election: Amadalavalasa
Party	Candidate	Votes	%	±%
TDP	Koona Ravikumar	88,003	44.88	▲
YSRCP	Thammineni Seethram	52,971	27.01	▼
Independent	Gandhi Suvvari	9,537	4.86	New
INC	Annajirao Sanapala	3,481	1.78	
	Remaining	2,415	1.23	▼
NOTA	None of the above	2,300	1.17	▼
Turnout		1,58,707	80.93	▲
Registered electors		1,96,098		
Majority		35,032	17.87	
TDP gain from YSRCP		Swing		

=== 2019 ===
2019 Andhra Pradesh Legislative Assembly election: Amadalavalasa
Party	Candidate	Votes	%	±%
YSRCP	Thammineni Seethram	77,897	41.07	▲
TDP	Koona Ravikumar	63,906	33.69	▼
JSP	Pedada Ramamohana Rao	3,280	1.73	New
	Remaining	2,332	1.23	▼
NOTA	None of the above	2,656	1.40	▲
Turnout		1,50,071	79.12	▲
Registered electors		1,89,677		
Majority		13,991	7.38	
YSRCP gain from TDP		Swing		

=== 2014 ===
2014 Andhra Pradesh Legislative Assembly election:
Party	Candidate	Votes	%	±%
TDP	Koona Ravikumar	65,233	37.53	
YSRCP	Thammineni Seethram	59,784	34.40	New
INC	Boddepalli Satyavathi	4,918	2.83	
	Remaining	3,590	2.10	
NOTA	None of the above	586	0.34	
Turnout		1,34,111	77.17	
Registered electors		1,73,788		
Majority		5,449	3.13	
TDP gain from INC		Swing		

=== 1978 ===
1978 Andhra Pradesh Legislative Assembly election: Amadalavalasa
Party	Candidate	Votes	%	±%
INC	Pydi Sreerama Murty	21,750	34.6	
INC	Venkatappalanaidu Peerukatla	18,375	29.2	
Janta Party	Thammineni Paparao	17,559	27.9	
Independent	Metta Jaggubhatlu	4,317	6.9	New
Independent	Banna Karunakararao	848	1.4	New
Majority		3,375	5.2	
Turnout		64,910	78.0	
INC win (new seat)				

=== 1983 ===
1983 Andhra Pradesh Legislative Assembly election: Amadalavalasa
Party	Candidate	Votes	%	±%
TDP	Thammineni Seetharam	22,557	40.5	New
INC	Pydi Murty	21,284	33.7	▼0.9
Independent	Peerukatla Venkatappala Naidu	14,140	22.4	New
JP	Majji Sreeramulu	832	1.3	▼26.6
Independent	Panchadi Rao	751	1.2	New
Independent	Sadu Parasayya	280	0.4	New
Independent	Metta Jaggubhatlu	222	0.4	▼6.5
Independent	Siripruapu Anthoni	81	0.1	New
Majority		4,273	6.6	▲1.4
Turnout		64,541	75.1	▼2.9
TDP gain from INC		Swing	▲30.45	

=== 1985 ===
1985 Andhra Pradesh Legislative Assembly election: Amadalavalasa
Party	Candidate	Votes	%	±%
TDP	Thammineni Seetharam	34,697	50.4	▲9.9
INC	Pydi Murty	32,568	47.3	▲13.6
Independent	Metta Bhatlu	807	1.2	▲0.8
Independent	Geddapu Yerrayya	400	0.6	New
Independent	Krishna Rao Bodoepalli	398	0.6	New
Majority		2,129	3.1	▼3.5
Turnout		69,780	76.1	▲1
TDP hold		Swing		

=== 1989 ===
1989 Andhra Pradesh Legislative Assembly election: Amadalavalasa
Party	Candidate	Votes	%	±%
INC	Pydi Sreerama Murty	40,879	49.4	▲2.1
TDP	Thammineni Sitharam	37,383	45.2	▼5.2
Independent	Killi Narasimham	4,501	5.4	▲2.8
Majority		3,496	4.1	▲1
Turnout		85,790	76.3	▲0.2
INC gain from TDP		Swing		

=== 1994 ===
1994 Andhra Pradesh Legislative Assembly election: Amadalavalasa
Party	Candidate	Votes	%	±%
TDP	Tammineni Seetaram	44,783	52.1	▲6.9
INC	Chittibaby Boddepalli	39,549	46.0	▼3.4
BSP	Venkata Rao Gurugubilli	652	0.8	▼36.6
BJP	Dulapu Punyavathi	521	0.6	New
Independent	Kondeti Pushparaju	209	0.2	New
Independent	Macharla Rao	129	0.2	New
Independent	Kallepalli Rao	62	0.1	New
Majority		5,234	6.0	▲1.9
Turnout		87,329	73.9	▼2.4
TDP gain from INC		Swing	▲30.45	

=== 1999 ===
1999 Andhra Pradesh Legislative Assembly election: Amadalavalasa
Party	Candidate	Votes	%	±%
TDP	Thammineni Seetharam	42,543	50.6	▼1.5
INC	Satyavathi Boddepalli	41,032	48.8	▲2.8
Anna Telugu Desam Party	Papa Rao Suvvari	441	0.5	
Majority		1,511	1.8	▼4.2
Turnout		86,237	65.2	▼8.7
TDP hold		Swing		

=== 2004 ===
2004 Andhra Pradesh Legislative Assembly election: Amadalavalasa
Party	Candidate	Votes	%	±%
INC	Boddepalli Satyavathi	46,300	52.1	▲3.3
TDP	Thammineni Seetharam	42,614	47.9	▼2.7
Majority		3,686	4.2	▲2.4
Turnout		88,604	76.5	▲11.3
INC gain from TDP		Swing	▲3.0	

=== 2009 ===
2009 Andhra Pradesh Legislative Assembly election: Amadalavalasa
Party	Candidate	Votes	%	±%
INC	Boddepalli Satyavathi	48,128	40.3	▼11.8
PRP	Thammineni Seetharam	31,919	26.7	New
TDP	Kuna Ravi Kumar	29,431	24.6	▼23.3
BJP	Killi Srirama Murthy	3,262	2.7	New
Independent	Korada Shyam Sundar Rao	2,347	2.0	New
LSP	Annam Naidu Tammineni	2,236	1.9	New
Majority		16,209	13.5	▲9.3
Turnout		1,19,531	74.7	▼1.9
INC hold		Swing	▲5.75	

== See also ==
- List of constituencies of Andhra Pradesh Legislative Assembly
