= Naupada =

- town
- Interactive map of Naupada
- Location in Andhra Pradesh, India Naupada (India)
- Coordinates: 18.5667°N 84.3°E
- Country: India
- State: Andhra Pradesh
- District: Srikakulam
- Elevation: 5 m (16 ft)

Languages
  - Official: Telugu
- Time zone: UTC+5:30 (IST)
- Vehicle registration: AP

Naupada is a village located in Santha Bommali mandal of Srikakulam district near to major town palasa, and Tekkali constituency in Andhra Pradesh, India. It is famous for salt fields and called the "Salt Bowl of Andhra Pradesh". It is better known for its railway junction station.

Geographically, the settlement known as "Naupada" is called Khaspanaupada.

== Geography ==
Naupada is located at 18.5667N 84.3E. It has an average elevation of 5 metre (19 ft).

== Transport ==
Naupada railway station is 2 km from Naupada village. It is a railway junction on the Howrah-Chennai main line and express trains halt here. Naupada-Gunupur branch line was converted in 2011 from narrow gauge to 5 ft 6 in (1,676 mm) broad gauge.
