= Kinjarapu Atchannaidu =

Indian politician

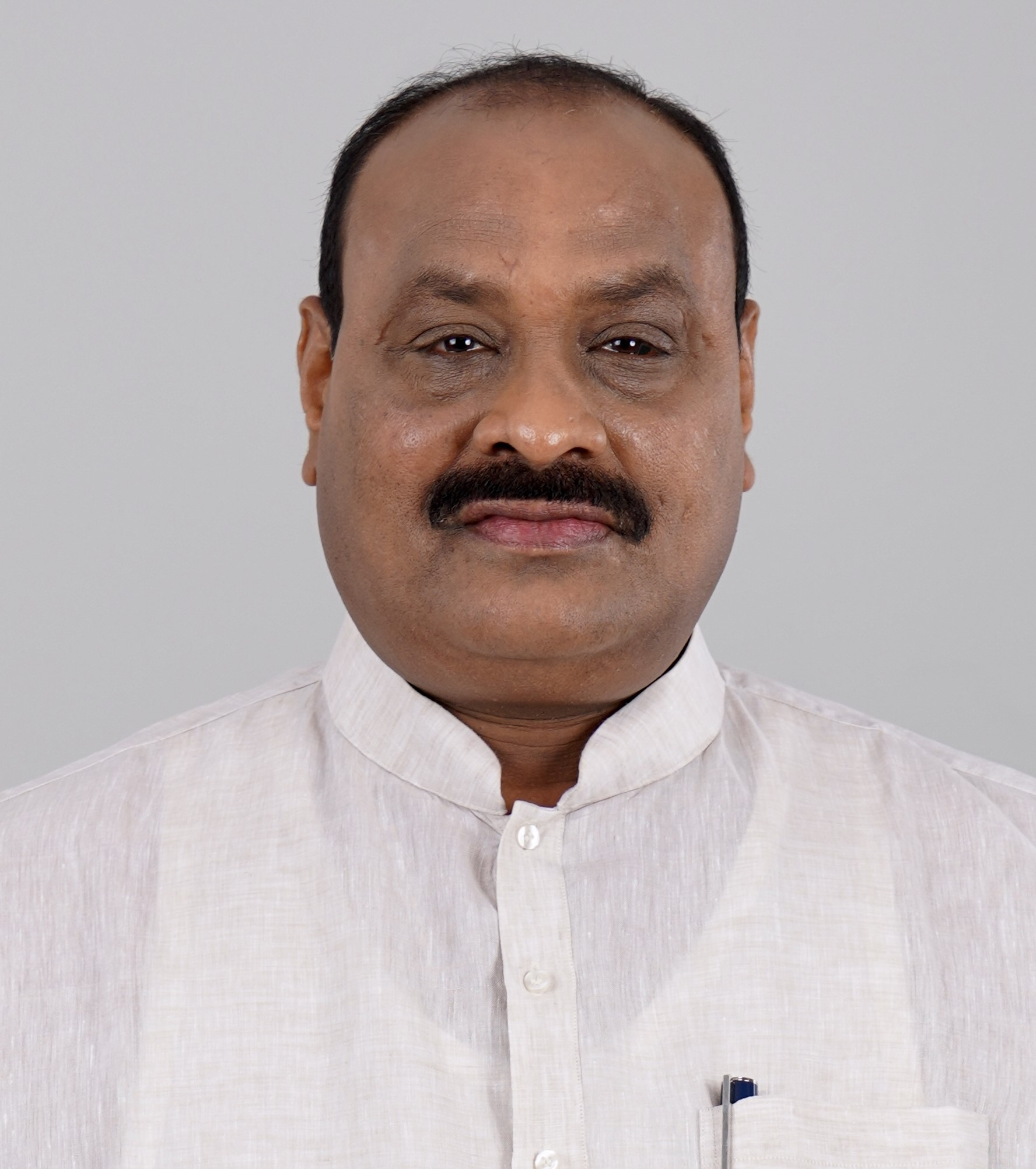

Minister of Animal Husbandry, Dairy Development & Fisheries Government of Andhra Pradesh
- Incumbent
- Assumed office 12 June 2024
- Governor: S. Abdul Nazeer
- Chief Minister: N. Chandrababu Naidu
- Preceded by: Seediri Appalaraju

Minister of Agriculture, Co-operation & Marketing Government of Andhra Pradesh
- Incumbent
- Assumed office 12 June 2024
- Governor: S. Abdul Nazeer
- Chief Minister: N. Chandrababu Naidu
- Preceded by: Kakani Govardhan Reddy

2nd President of the Telugu Desam Party, Andhra Pradesh
- In office 20 October 2020 – 14 June 2024
- National President: N. Chandrababu Naidu
- Preceded by: Kimidi Kalavenkata Rao
- Succeeded by: Palla Srinivasa Rao

Minister of Transport, Backward Classes Welfare & Empowerment, Handlooms & Textiles Government of Andhra Pradesh
- In office 2 April 2017 – 29 May 2019
- Governor: E. S. L. Narasimhan
- Chief Minister: N. Chandrababu Naidu
- Preceded by: Kollu Ravindra; Sidda Raghava Rao
- Succeeded by: Malagundla Sankaranarayana; Perni Venkataramaiah

Minister for Labour, Employment, Factories, Youth & Sports, Skill Development & Entrepreneurship Government of Andhra Pradesh
- In office 8 June 2014 – 2 April 2017
- Governor: E. S. L. Narasimhan
- Chief Minister: N. Chandrababu Naidu
- Preceded by: President's Rule
- Succeeded by: Pithani Satyanarayana; Kollu Ravindra

Member of the Andhra Pradesh Legislative Assembly
- Incumbent
- Assumed office 2014
- Preceded by: Korla Bharathi
- Constituency: Tekkali
- In office 1996–2009
- Preceded by: Kinjarapu Yerran Naidu
- Succeeded by: constituency abolished
- Constituency: Harishchandrapuram

Personal details
- Party: Telugu Desam Party
- Relations: Kinjarapu Yerran Naidu (brother); Ram Mohan Naidu Kinjarapu (nephew)
- Website: http://www.kinjarapu.com/

Kinjarapu Atchannaidu is an Indian politician from Andhra Pradesh. He is serving as the Member of the Legislative Assembly (MLA) representing the Tekkali constituency from the Telugu Desam Party (TDP) since 2014. He is the chief of TDP for the state of Andhra Pradesh from 2020 till 2024. He is currently serving as the cabinet minister in the Government of Andhra Pradesh.

== Personal life ==
Atchannaidu born in Nimmada village Kotabommali mandal Srikakulam district He is fourth Son for his Parents He is belongs to Velama community(caste).He is the brother of Kinjarapu Yerran Naidu and uncle of Ram Mohan Naidu Kinjarapu.

== Career ==
Atchannaidu was elected as an MLA from the Harishchandrapuram constituency in three consecutive elections: 1996 by-poll, 1999 and 2004. Following the reorganization and dissolution of the Harishchandrapuram constituency, he contested and lost the 2009 elections for the Tekkali constituency. He also lost the immediate by-poll in 2009 that occurred due to the death of the elected MLA. He was elected back in the 2014, 2019 and 2024 elections from the Tekkali constituency.

He held the portfolio of Transport Ministry during the Third N. Chandrababu Naidu ministry.
