= Palasa Assembly constituency =

Constituency of the Andhra Pradesh Legislative Assembly, India

Coordinates: 18.77°N 80.41°E

Palasa
- Constituency No. 2 for the Andhra Pradesh Legislative Assembly
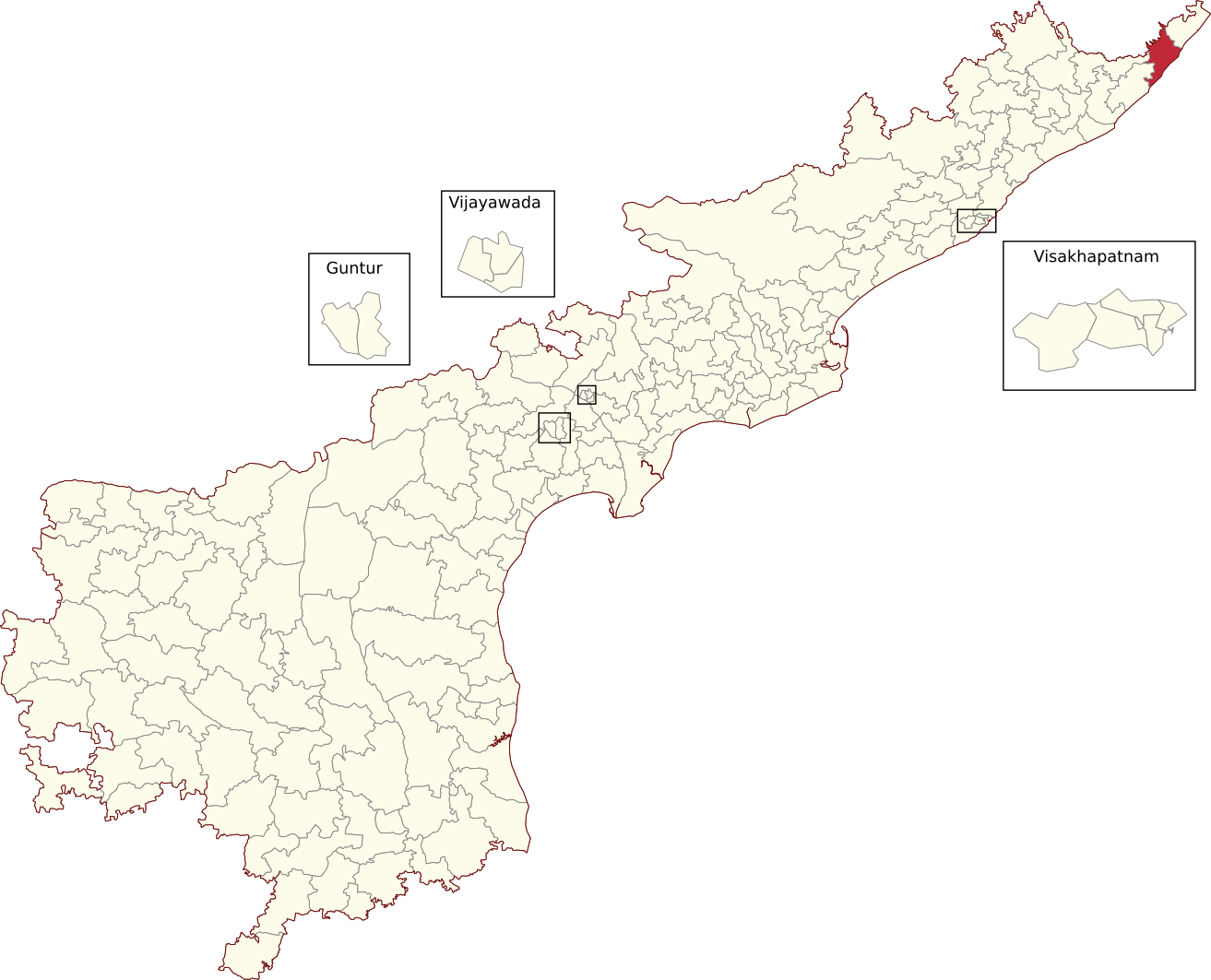
- Location of Palasa Assembly constituency within Andhra Pradesh

Constituency details
- Country: India
- Region: South India
- State: Andhra Pradesh
- District: Srikakulam
- Lok Sabha constituency: Srikakulam
- Established: 2008
- Total electors: 204,109
- Reservation: None

Member of Legislative Assembly
- 16th Andhra Pradesh Legislative Assembly
- Incumbent Gouthu Sireesha
- Party: TDP
- Alliance: NDA
- Elected year: 2024

Palasa Assembly constituency is a constituency in Srikakulam district of Andhra Pradesh that elects representatives to the Andhra Pradesh Legislative Assembly in India. It is one of the seven assembly segments of Srikakulam Lok Sabha constituency.

Most Successful parties from Palasa Assembly
1. TDP(2 Times) (50.0%)
2. INC (1 Time) (25.0%)
3. YSRCP (1 time) (25.0%)

Gouthu Sireesha is the current MLA, having won the 2024 Andhra Pradesh Legislative Assembly election from Telugu Desam Party. As of 2019, there are a total of 204,109 electors in the constituency. The constituency was established in 2008, as per the Delimitation Orders (2008).

== Mandals ==
The three mandals that form the assembly constituency.

Mandals
Palasa
Mandasa
Vajrapu Kotturu

Mandals in Palasa Assembly Constituency

== Members of the Legislative Assembly ==
Year	Member	Political party
2009	Juttu Jagannaikulu	Indian National Congress
2014	Gouthu Syam Sunder Sivaji	Telugu Desam Party
2019	Seediri Appalaraju	YSR Congress Party
2024	Gouthu Sireesha	Telugu Desam Party

== Election results ==
=== 2024 ===
2024 Andhra Pradesh Legislative Assembly election: Palasa (2,22,378)
Party	Candidate	Votes	%	±%
TDP	Gouthu Sireesha	101,560	45.67	▲16.48
YSRCP	Seediri Appalaraju	61,210	27.53	▼9.51
	Remaining	2,503	1.12	▼1.08
NOTA	None of the above	2,762	1.24	▼0.23
Turnout		1,68,035	75.56	▲2.69
Registered electors		2,22,378		
Majority		40,350	18.14	
TDP gain from YSRCP		Swing		

=== 2019 ===
2019 Andhra Pradesh Legislative Assembly election: Palasa (2,06,799)
Party	Candidate	Votes	%	±%
TDP	Gouthu Sireesha	60,356	29.19	▼7.29
YSRCP	Seediri Appalaraju	76,603	37.04	▲9.73
JSP	Kotha Purnachandra Rao	6,133	2.97	New
	Remaining	4,555	2.2	▼4.56
NOTA	None of the above	3,044	1.47	▲1.09
Turnout		1,50,691	72.87	▲0.96
Registered electors		2,06,799		
Majority		16,247	7.85	
YSRCP gain from TDP		Swing		

=== 2014 ===
2014 Andhra Pradesh Legislative Assembly election: Palasa
Party	Candidate	Votes	%	±%
TDP	Gouthu Syam Sunder Sivaji	69,658	36.48	
YSRCP	Baburao Vajja	52,133	27.31	New
INC	Nageswara Rao Vanka	1,863	0.98	
	Remaining	12,912	6.76	
NOTA	None of the above	728	0.38	
Turnout		1,37,294	71.91	
Registered electors		1,90,925		
Majority		17,525	9.17	
TDP gain from INC		Swing		

=== 2009 ===
2009 Andhra Pradesh Legislative Assembly election: Palasa
Party	Candidate	Votes	%	±%
INC	Juttu Jagannaikulu	47,931	40.5	
TDP	Gouthu Syam Sunder Sivaji	41,117	34.8	
PRP	Nageswara Rao Vanka	22,213	18.8	New
Majority		6,814	5.8	
Turnout		118,288	73.7	
INC win (new seat)				

== See also ==
- List of constituencies of the Andhra Pradesh Legislative Assembly
