= Meliaputti =

- Village
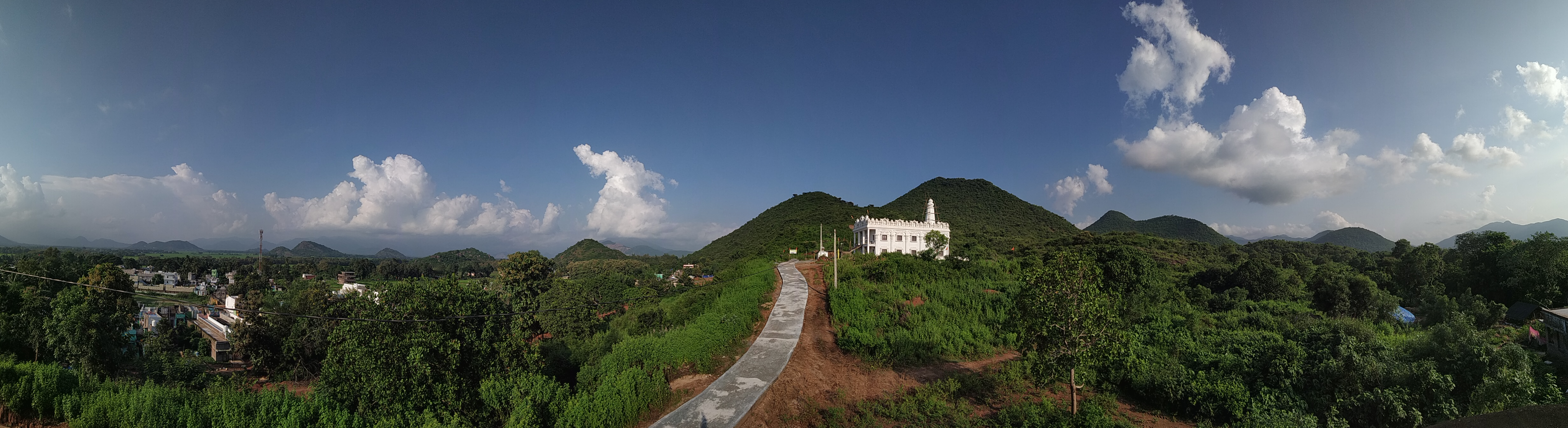
- Sai Baba Temple
- Interactive map of Meliaputti
- Location in Andhra Pradesh, India Meliaputti (India)
- Coordinates: 18.7667°N 84.1667°E
- Country: India
- State: Andhra Pradesh
- District: Srikakulam
- Talukas: Meliaputti

Area
  - Total: 2.30 km^{2} (0.89 sq mi)

Population (2011)
  - Total: 7,741
  - Density: 3,370/km^{2} (8,720/sq mi)

Languages
  - Official: Telugu
- Time zone: UTC+5:30 (IST)
- PIN: 532215
- Vehicle Registration: AP30 (Former); AP39 (from 30 January 2019)
- Lok Sabha constituency: Srikakulam
- Vidhan Sabha constituency: Pathapatnam

Meliaputti or Meliaputti is a village in Srikakulam district of the Indian state of Andhra Pradesh. It is located in Meliaputti mandal of Tekkali revenue division.

== Geography ==
Meliyaputti is located at 18.7667°N 84.1667°E. It has an average elevation of 74 meters (246 feet). River Mahendra tanaya flows besides the village.

== Demographics ==
As of 2001 Indian census, the demographic details of Meliaputti mandal is as follows:

- Total Population: 50,490 in 11,532 Households
- Male Population: 24,947 and Female Population: 25,543
- Children Under 6-years of age: 7,044 (Boys – 3,560 and Girls – 3,484)
- Total Literates: 22,766
