= Duvvada Srinivas =

Indian politician

Member of Legislative Council, Andhra Pradesh
- Incumbent
- Assumed office 30 March 2021

Personal details
- Born: 4 November 1966 (age 59)
- Party: Independent
- Other political affiliations: YSR Congress Party

Duvvada Srinivas (born 4 November 1966) is an Indian politician. As of August 2024, he serves as the Member of Legislative Council in the Andhra Pradesh Legislative Council. He belongs to the YSR Congress Party.

Srinivas is the proprietor of D Srinivas Granite. He has been married, but has left his family in 2024 and is now living with Duvvada Madhuri. In August 2024 Srinivas alleged to Police that his wife, Vani, made an attempt on his life.

In April 2025, the YSR Congress Party suspended him from the party as a disciplinary action.
