= Bon Om Touk =

Cambodian holiday

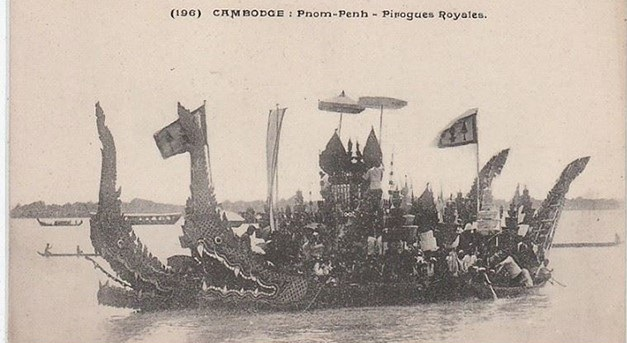
- Cambodian Water Festival celebration in front of the Royal Palace in Phnom Penh, Cambodia 1914.
- Official name: Khmer: ព្រះរាជពិធីបុណ្យអុំទូក បណ្ដែតប្រទីប អកអំបុក និងសំពះព្រះខែ (The Royal Boat Racing Festival, Lanterns Floating, Taste the Ambok and Worship the Moon)
- Also called: Bon Om Touk; Cambodian Water Festival
- Observed by: Cambodians
- Significance: Marks the Cambodian Water Festival
- Duration: 3 days
- Frequency: annual
- Related to: Loy Krathong (in Thailand and Laos), Il Poya (in Sri Lanka) Tazaungdaing festival (in Myanmar), Boita Bandana (in Odisha, India)

Bon Om Touk (Khmer: បុណ្យអុំទូក, Bŏn Om Tuk, lit. "Boat Paddling Festival"), also known as the Cambodian Water and Moon Festival, is celebrated in late October or early November, often corresponding with the lunar Mid-Autumn Festival. It marks the end of the monsoon season. The festivities are accompanied by dragon boat races, similar to those seen in the Lao Boun Suang Huea festival.

The festival is celebrated over the span of three days and commemorates the end of the rainy season, as well as the change in flow of the Tonlé Sap River. The festival attracts several million people each year. Some activities that take place at the festival are boat races along the Sisowath Quay riverfront, fireworks, and evening concerts.

== Overview ==
The festival's celebrations occur over the span of three days, with the Royal Boat Race taking place on the first day. After the boat race, large lanterns are released as part of the "Bondet Bratib" ceremony at 6:00 pm as representatives from national institutions pray for peace from Preah Mae Kongkea or the Goddess Ganga. Each ministry has its lantern adorned with colorful lights and sets off fireworks to celebrate the river's rich glory.

The goddess originates from Hindu mythology surrounding the Ganges river in India. There is no Ganga river in Khmer, but the goddess is viewed as the mother of seas, rivers, streams, creeks, and lakes. She protects and provides the water for human and animal husbandry as well as the flow of sediments and fish. Cambodia also has a sacred river, the Tonle Sap, and festival goers communicate their love and respect for nature to the goddess through prayers of gratitude for her compassion. Prayers give thanks for happiness and for fruitful fishing in daily life.

The second day of the festival is the day of Og Ambok and involves the worship of the Moon. It takes place at twelve minutes past midnight and involves a lantern lighting ceremony with prayers to Preah Purthisat, who invented the legend of the Moon rabbit. The Og Ambok ceremony involves playing a group game where members must make each other laugh; whoever lasts the longest wins and decides the loser. The loser must then eat Ambok with bananas until the end of the day.

On the last day, a ribbon is cut, signifying the end of the boat race and the Water and Moon Festival.

== Royal Boat Racing Festival (Om Touk) ==
=== Historical event ===
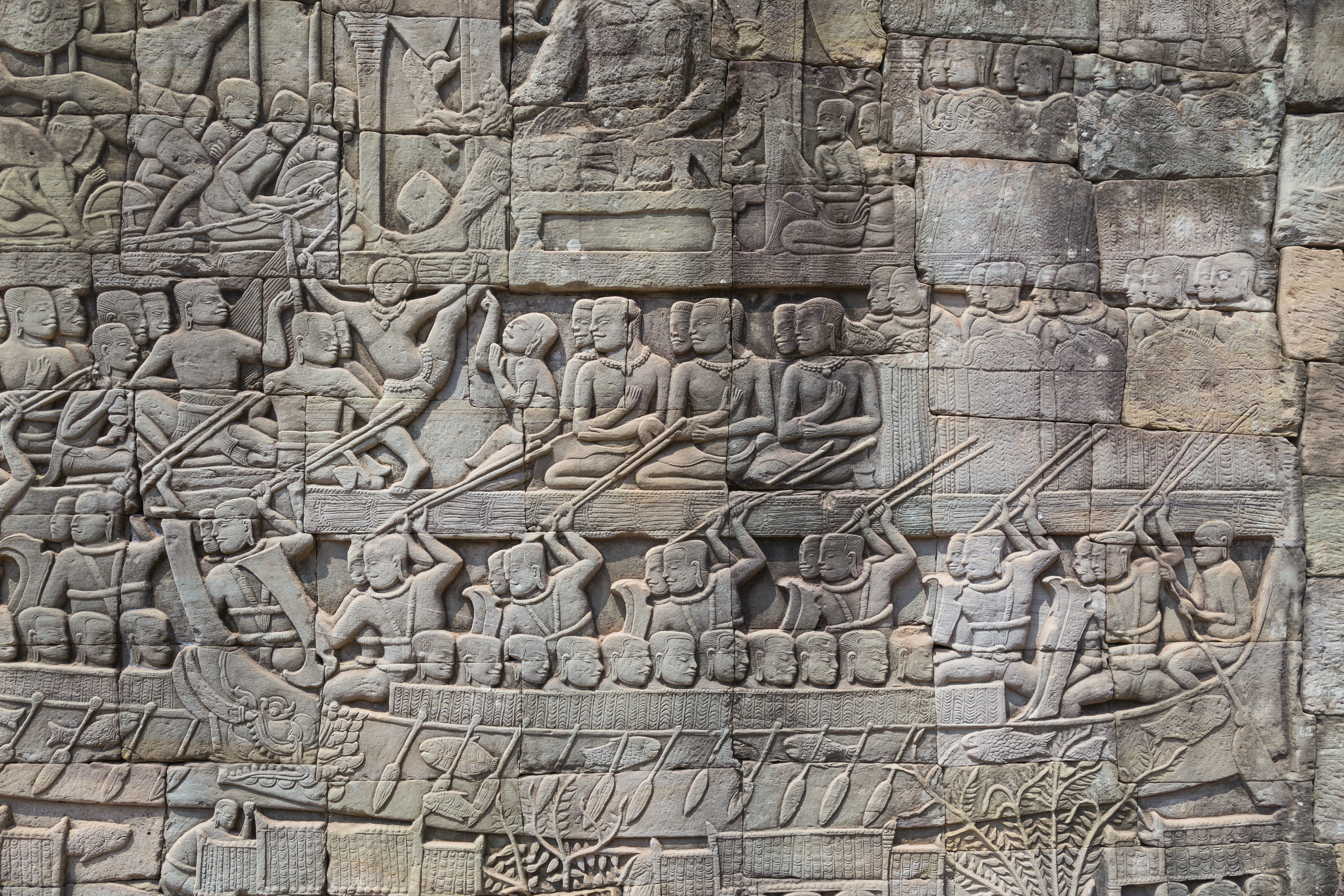
Khmer warriors on their long naval boat in the battle of Tonle Sap. Bayon Temple. 12th century.

Boat racing is believed to have been celebrated in Cambodia since at least the reign of Jayavarman VII in 1181 AD. This was likely to commemorate the heroic victory of the Khmer navy, which liberated their land from the Cham troops of the Champa Kingdom in a boat battle on the Tonle Sap Lake.

=== Literary record ===
According to the record of Thach Pen alias "Piko (Pang Khat)" from the Khleang Province (Soc Trang), Kampuchea Krom (Southern Vietnam), in 1528 AD, King Ang Chan I ordered Ponhea Tat, the commander of the Khmer navy in the Bassac District of Kampuchea Krom, to prepare the Khmer army to defend the province of Preah Trapeang (Tra Vinh, Vietnam), which was under attack from the Đại Việt kingdom under Mạc Đăng Dung.

The naval boats were divided into three groups:

- Group 1, called the "Toap Srouch", or vanguard, with boats shaped like modern racing boats called Ngor boats.
- Group 2, called the reserve army, with two rows of rowing boats shaped like modern stand racing boats.
- Group 3, called the Bassac Troops, was a large, very long open boat with a roof across the front, oars, and sails, shaped like the Bassac boat, called the Pok Chay boat. The boat was only used at night with lanterns, as a food supply boat for the army, delivering rice from Kampong Chhnang to Kampuchea Krom in Preah Trapeang Province until the Cambodian navy won.

After his victory, concurrent with the crowning of King Ang Chan I in 1529 AD, he celebrated the Bondet Bratib ceremony every year with candles at night to commemorate the victory over the Đại Việt and to give thanks to the goddess Ganga (Preah Mae Kongkea in Khmer language).

=== French protectorate ===
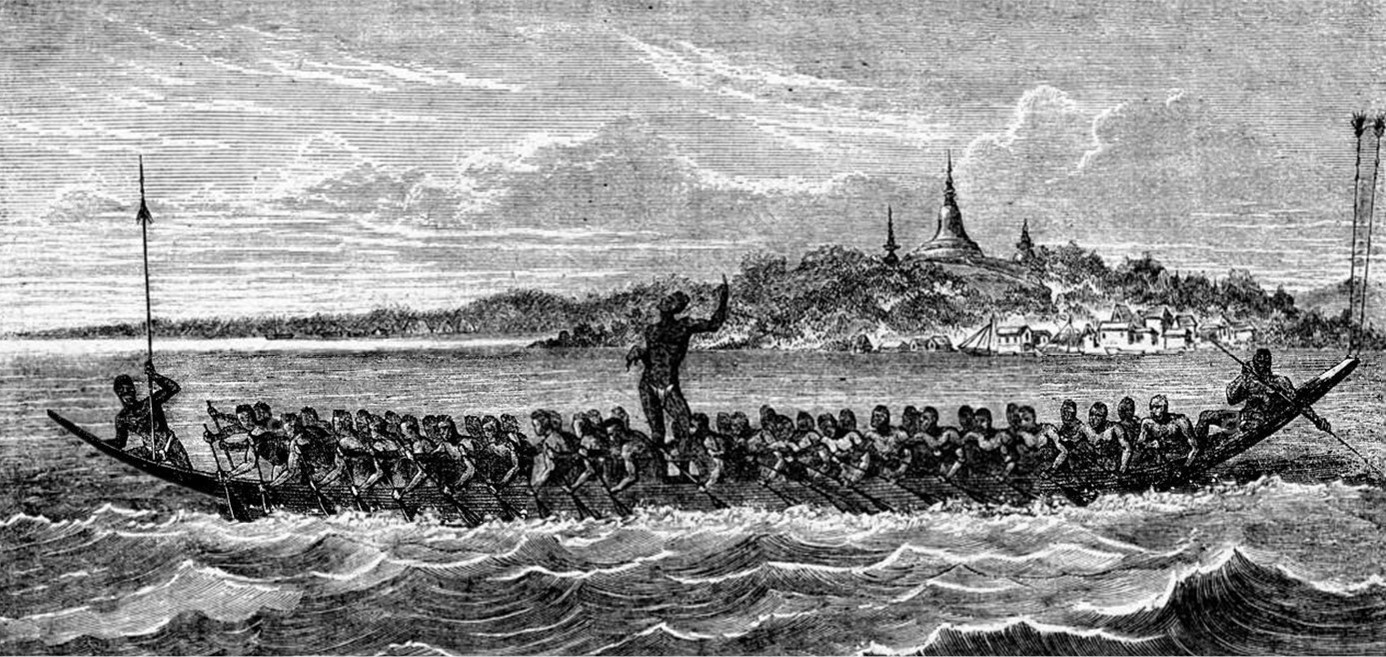
Cambodian racing boat at Phnom Penh near Wat Phnom in the background as depicted in 1873 Le Magasin Pittoresque publication of King Norodom.

As early as 1873, depictions of a Cambodian racing boat appeared in the French publication Le Magasin Pittoresque, and in 1887 the French magazine Les Colonies Françaises dedicated several pages to the meaning of the Water Festival. The festival had been celebrated occasionally after Phnom Penh became Cambodia's capital in 1866 during the French Protectorate period.

After World War II, the Water Festival was also celebrated in Phnom Penh in 1945, and then in 1953, after the Independence of Cambodia from France. In the 1960s, the scope of the festival grew with double the number of boats participating in the Phnom Penh boat racing festival compared to prior years. The festival was suspended during the Cambodian Civil War, but has been celebrated since the 1993 General Election supervised by UNTAC, until now. However, it has frequently been suspended because of incidents, natural disasters, and most recently because of the COVID-19 pandemic in 2020.

== Dancing on the racing boats ==
The art of dancing on the bow of a boat has been around for many years. Locals believe it represents a boat keeper's soul or a boat spirit, which may be the spirit of the person who took care of the boat. The tradition of having women dance on the bow of the boat continues to this day. Boat bow dancing also features a man representing the boat's coxswain shouting for his team to operate in unison to reach their destination. Racing boats are always painted with eyes, which give the impression of the boat being alive, and represent dragons floating on the water.

== Winners of boat race (2010-2020) ==
The boat race ranking in the Royal Water and Moon Festival, and awards by the King of Cambodia.

Year	Rating	Boat's name	Boat's capacity	Location
2021	—N/a	Water Festival suspended due to COVID-19 outbreak	—N/a	—N/a
2020	—N/a	Water Festival suspended due to COVID-19 outbreak	—N/a	—N/a
2019	No. 1	Saray Decho Sen Chey	77 people	Kandal Province
2018	No. 1	Koh Kae Sen Chey Baramey Preah Ang Khmao	77 people	Preah Vihear Province
2017	No. 1	Saray Decho Sen Chey	77 people	Kandal Province
2016	No. 1	Kdam Brai	64 people	Kampong Chhnang Province
2015	—N/a	Water Festival suspended because the water level was too low. Political demonstrations were also suspected as a reason for the cancellation.	—N/a	—N/a
2014	No. 1	Srey Sros Kien Chrey Baramey Decho	75 people	Kampong Cham Province
2013	—N/a	Water Festival suspended due to national election	—N/a	—N/a
2012	—N/a	Water Festival suspended due to death of King Norodom Sihanouk	—N/a	—N/a
2011	—N/a	Water Festival suspended due to deadly crowd crush on Koh Pich Bridge in 22 November 2010, which took the lives of 350 people.	—N/a	—N/a
2010	No. 1	Prithea Char Moha Decho Sen Chey (Enemy Pepper)	72 people	Kampong Cham Province

== Festival of Illuminated Floats (Bondet Bratib) ==
=== Bratib (ប្រទីប) ===
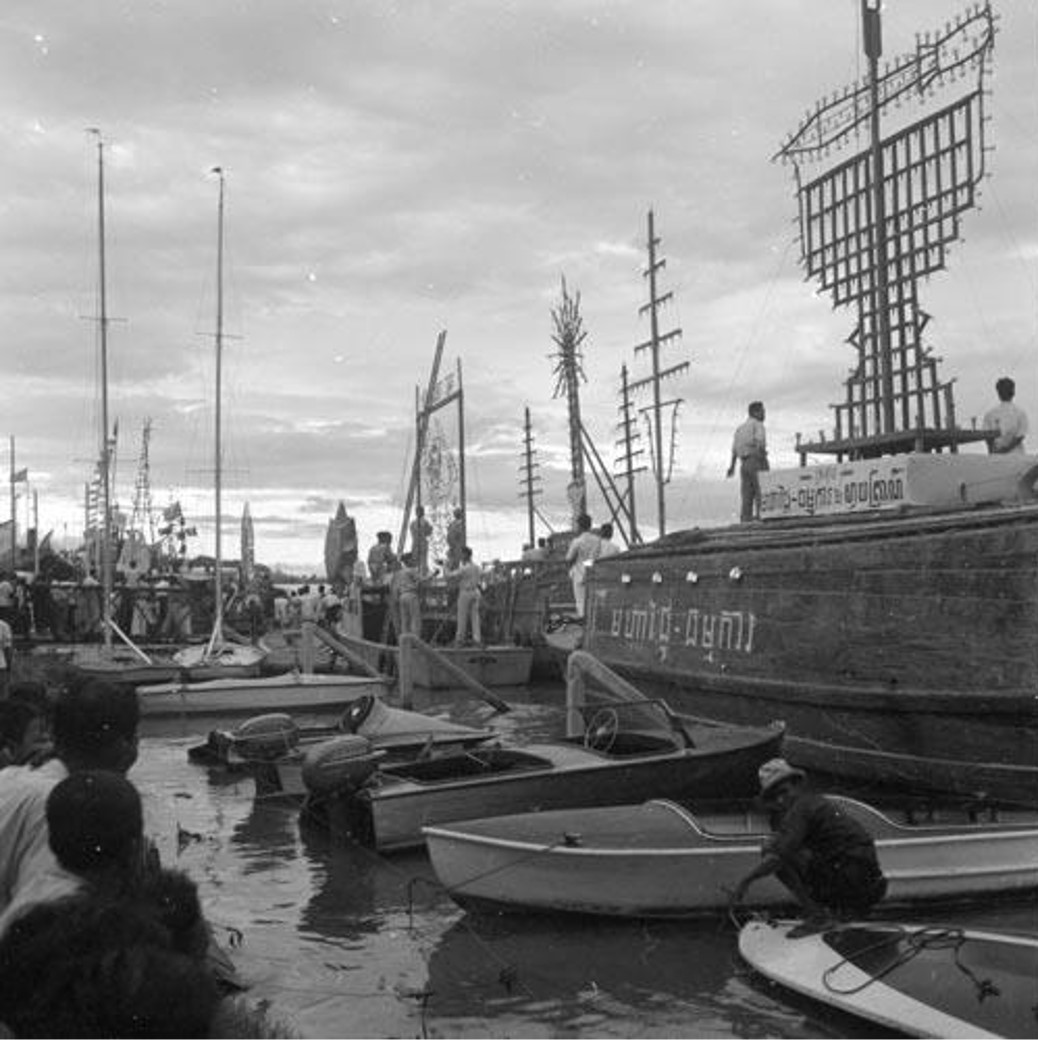
Early forms of illuminated floats during the Water Festival Celebration during the French colonial period in 1945 after the end of World War 2.

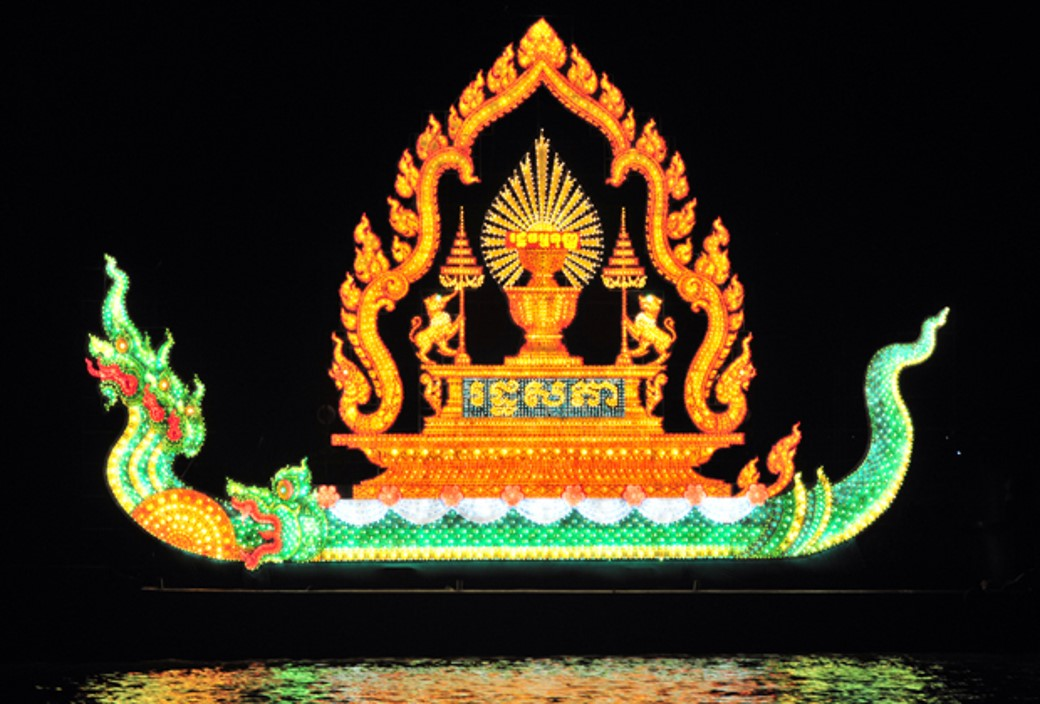
Illuminated float (Bratib) of National Assembly of Cambodia during the night of Water Festival.

"Bratib (ប្រទីប)" refers to lanterns and lamps. In Khmer, small lamps without glass are used: light lantern frames or figurines are placed on a boat or raft. Some are illuminated floating water lanterns lined up in a row, in a frame, or vertically, shining brightly for the festival. The Cambodian Lantern Festival is similar to India's "Ganga puja" or "Ganga Dussehra," which is celebrated every year to pay homage to the Goddess Ganga. The Lantern Floating Ceremony is for Cambodians to remember their gratitude to the water that is essential to sustain their lives. Floating lanterns dedicated to both Hinduism and Buddhism are launched. In the Buddhist tradition, mentioned in the Pali Khmer version of Teathavong scripture Tathagata Pali, it is stated that the four glass jaws of the Buddha Samma Samputa are in four places:

- In the Trāyastriṃśa, the paradise of the 33 devas
- In Nāga or Dragon World
- In Kandy, at Sri Lanka
- In Dantapuri, at Danthavarapukota India

This festival consecrates Preah Chongkhoum Keo (the tooth relics of Buddha). The Khmer people conduct this festival during the full moon of November in the belief that great merit and prosperity will be provided to the country. The Khmer people believe that Bondet Bratib took place in the eighth century; the original name floating "Bay Sey" or Bondet "Bay Sey" (បាយសី) in the Chenla period, the original Khmer religion depicting the people before the Angkorian period celebrating the rituals. "Preah Mae Kongkea", the Khmer goddess or guardian deity of the water, is revered by the Cambodian people.

== Differences between Loy Bratib and Loy Kantong ==
=== Kantong (កន្ទោង) ===
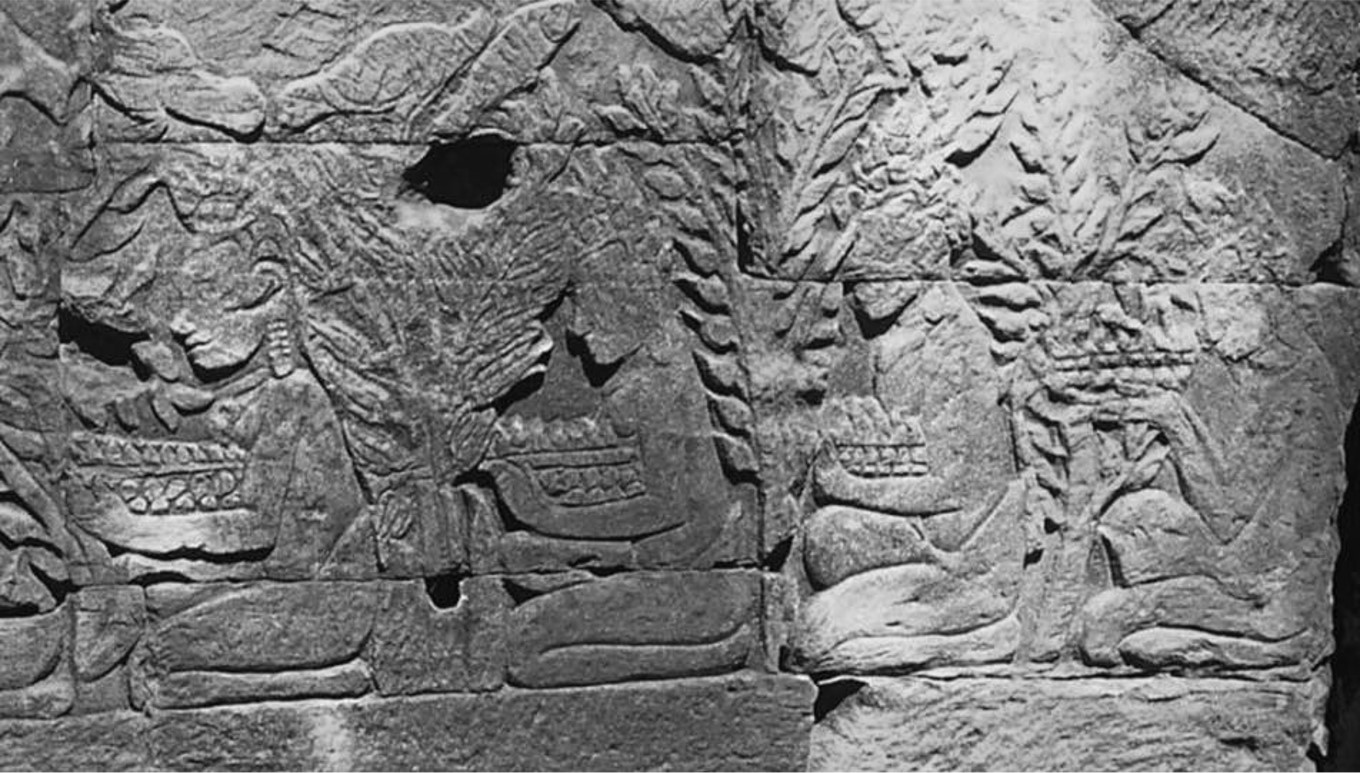
Royal concubines dedicating and holding kantong (containers made from leaves with ritual objects) as depicted at the 12th century Bayon temple, which is the origin of today's Loy Kantong.

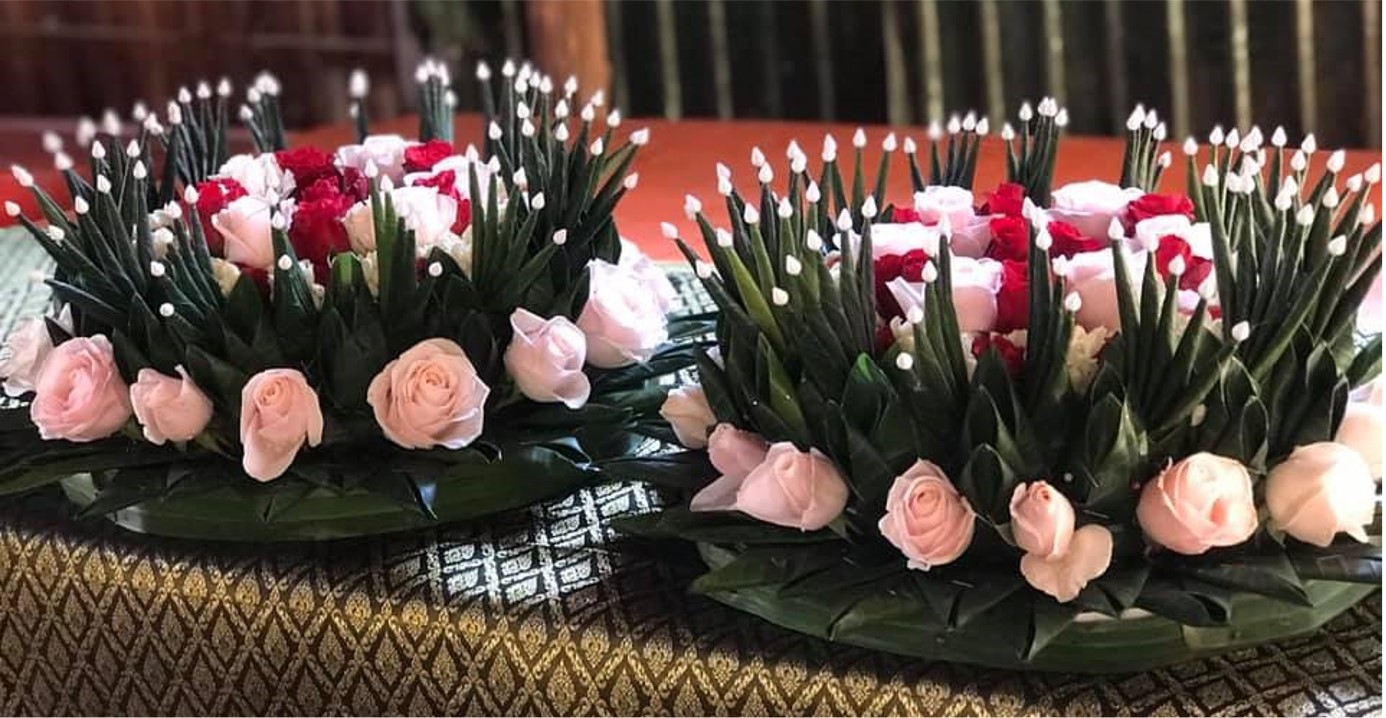
Kantong, a container made from leaves with flowers and offerings

កន្ទោង /kɑntouŋ/kantong/ Small container made of banana leaves (used esp. for steaming cakes or as a container for religious offerings such as food, tobacco, or betel).

The term kantong, kom toek (water lantern), and bratip (kantong with candle and light) are used exchangeable by the Khmer people.

LoyKantong Hindu Brahmin ritual originated during Water Chenla era of Khmer civilization. It was first practice along the banks of the Mekong river delta during the time period when Shailendra dynasty of Java ruled Water Chenla. Khmer and Javanese Hindu Brahmin priests trace their religious lineage back to Utkala Brahmins of Odisha. The Boita Bandana or Dangā Bhasā festival rituals may have been one of the influences for creating LoyKantong.

LoyKantong are religious offerings for Hindu goddess Ganga to show gratitude and appreciation for the life giving waters of the Mekong river. Khmers still practice LoyKantong ritual even though they no longer believe in Hinduism. The ritual offerings are still practice during Bon Om Touk festival every year after the end of monsoon rain season.

Khmer Princess Neang Sikhara Mahadevi is believed to have brought the Loy Kantong ritual to Sukhothai when she married Pho Khun Pha Mueang, ruler of Sukhothai Kingdom.

The Khmer-Javanese compound word LoyKantong លយកន្ទោង /lɔɔy kɑntooŋ/ to make an offering to the spirits by floating small bowls made of leaves and filled with food, etc. out into the river.

The Khmer word Loy លយ /lɔɔy/ V. to float along, drift; to go with the current; to swim; to set adrift, launch, float something.

The Javanese/Malay loan word Kantong កន្ទោង /kɑntouŋ/ N. small container made of banana leaves (used esp. for steaming cakes or as a container for religious offerings such as food, tobacco, or betel).

== Og Ambok and Sampeah Preah Khae ==
=== Og Ambok ===
Og Ambok
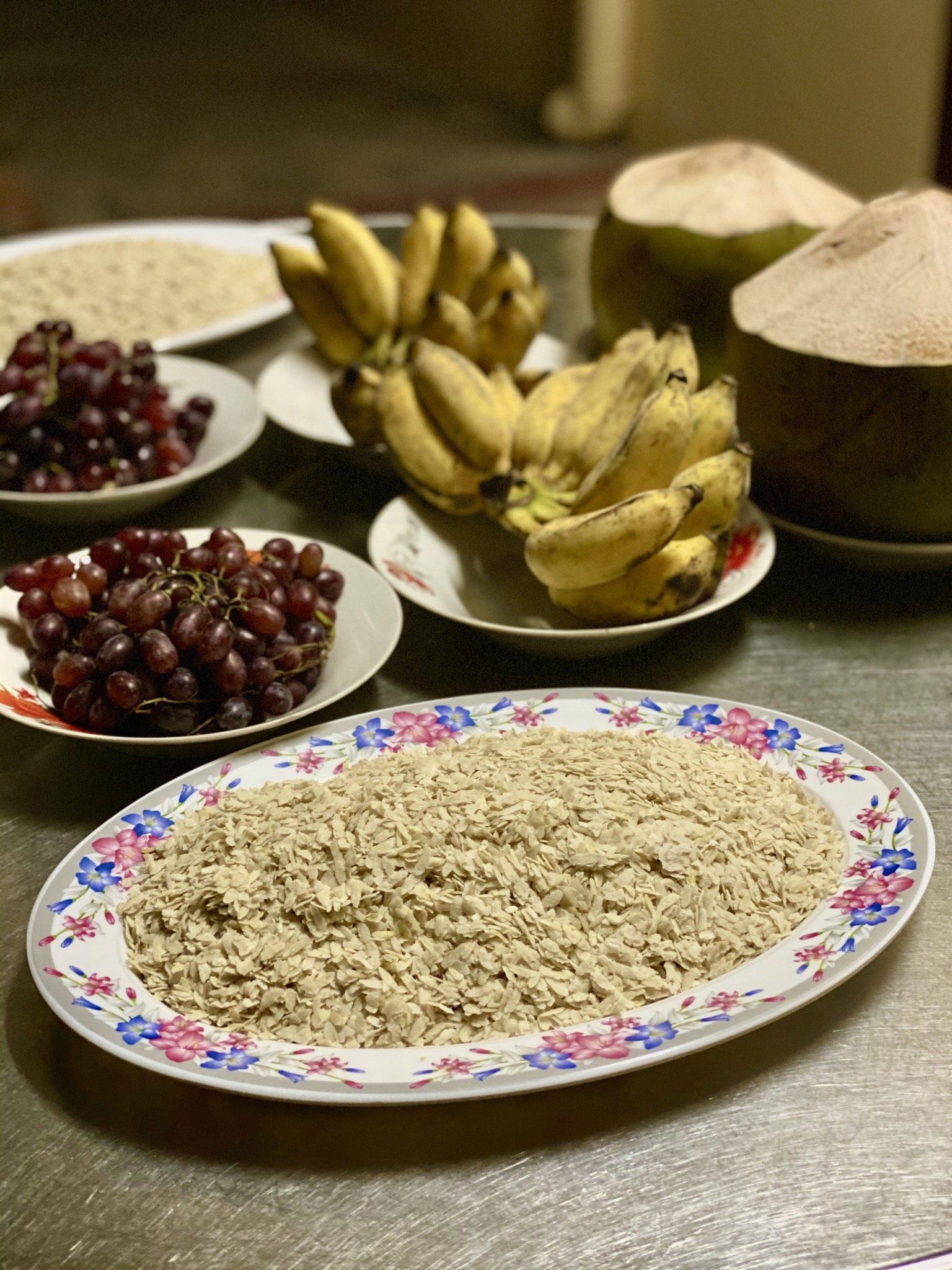
- Traditional rice dish of the Cambodian Bon Om Touk Festival, served with coconut and grapes in an ordinary Khmer household.

Og Ambok (Khmer: អកអំបុក, IPA: [ʔog ɑmboːk], also "Ok Om Bok" especially in Vietnam) is a traditional flattened rice dish that forms part of the Bon Om Touk. During the festival, Khmers eat Ambok with coconut juice and bananas.

Og Ambok is made by frying rice in its natural husks, then beating it in a pestle until soft before the husks are removed and mixed in with banana and coconut juice for flavor. This mixture is eaten when the clock strikes midnight or when the incense offered at the beginning of the gathering is consumed. Og Ambok remains a popular traditional dish and it is sold widely during the Bon Om Touk festival.

=== The Legend of Og Ambok ===
The Og Ambok ceremony's history dates back many years. It is believed that in the reign of King Barom Reachea III he dreamed of Indra fighting with a demon in the Longvek fortress. Rechea saw Indra throwing a ray of lightning to kill the beast. Suddenly the sound of thunder from the lightning strike awakened him. In the morning, he sent his officers to inspect the surrounding land in Banteay Longvek and found the site of a real lightning strike. The King started "Krong Peali", offering a ceremony to pray to the deities of the eight gods of directions for three days. He ordered the army to build a pagoda to worship Indra called "Indra Pagoda" in Kampong Chhnang Province and later changed its name to Wat Preah Indra Tep by building a statue of the Buddha in Kampong Chhnang. When the pagoda's construction was completed, he organized this ceremony to spread the ambok.

=== Indra ===
On the second day of the Royal Water Festival, there is a special commemoration to Lord Indra. The reversal of the Tonle Sap river suggests why a parallel could be drawn between the Khmer people and Lord Indra. Indra is the one who releases the water from the winter demon. This is the most common theme of the Rigveda concerning Lord Indra: he as the god with thunderbolt kills the evil serpent Vritra that held back rains and thus releases rains, nourishing rivers. For example, the Rigvedic hymn 1.32 dedicated to Indra reads:

इन्द्रस्य नु वीर्याणि प्र वोचं यानि चकार प्रथमानि वज्री ।
अहन्नहिमन्वपस्ततर्द प्र वक्षणा अभिनत्पर्वतानाम् ॥१॥
अहन्नहिं पर्वते शिश्रियाणं त्वष्टास्मै वज्रं स्वर्यं ततक्ष।
वाश्रा इव धेनवः स्यन्दमाना अञ्जः समुद्रमव जग्मुरापः ॥२॥

— Rigveda, 1.32.1–2
Translation:

Let me tell you the manly deeds of Indra, which he first accomplished, bolt-weaponed,
He slew the serpent, opened up waters, cleft in twain the belly of mountains,॥1॥
He slew the serpent on the mountain, with a heavenly bolt made by Tvastar,
Like lowing cattle downward sped the waters, then flowed to the ocean.॥2॥

=== Dal Ambok ===
During the ceremony, four or five punchers are assigned to help and two or three rookers are in each group. Assemblers are assigned to collect Angre mortars and search for shredded wood. Normally, at Moha Ambok, 30 to 50 mortars are used to make this a solemn ceremony. Participants at the event are organised into groups of 8 or 30 people. The Og Ambok ceremony is performed when the Moon is straight or when the Moon is directly overhead. The young men approach the central table and dance in groups lined with lanterns. A woman collects the Lombok and pours the bus into the man's mouth. The official calls Og Ambok repeatedly asking, "Is it full?" The participants continue to chant until the end of the Moon worship. The significance of the Og Ambok ceremony is to confirm the abundance of food stored throughout the year.

==== Legend of the Cheadok: The Moon Rabbit ====
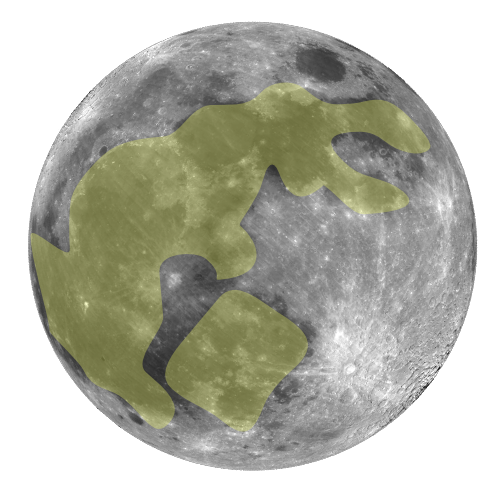
The image of a rabbit and mortar delineated on the Moon's surface

In the Buddhist Jataka tales called Cheadok in its Khmer version, Tale 316 relates that a monkey, an otter, a jackal, and a rabbit resolved to practice charity on the day of the full moon (Uposatha), believing a demonstration of great virtue would earn a great reward. According to the Khmer version of the popular legend in the Sovannasam Cheadok (ជាតក), this rabbit is called Pothisat. Every full moon, this holy rabbit would offer his life to someone who wanted to become a Buddha. One full moon, the god Indra found out and tested the animals about this. He presented himself under the appearance of an old Brahman of Hinduism, and asked the rabbit called Sasabandit for food. The rabbit did not have much food and he agreed to give his life to the old Brahman for food. But the old Brahman said, "This rabbit has observed moral precepts for a long time, so he cannot be killed." Then the rabbit told the old man to make a fire, and then jumped into the fire to kill himself so that the old man could eat him. But before he jumped into the fire, he quietly wished that he could stay alive. Later the old Brahman transformed himself into Indra and said that pure alms-giving is a virtue. Indra called to the Goddess Ganga to make the image of the rabbit appear in the Moon forever after his death. According to this legend, the rabbit can still be seen on the surface of the Moon.

==== Salutation of the Moon: Sampeah Preah Khae ====
The Sampeah Preah Khae (Khmer: សំពះព្រះខែ, IPA: [sɑmpeəʰ preəʰ kʰaːe]; "Moon salutation") or direct translation “prayers to the moon” is a Buddhist religious festival which is dedicated to the Moon and coincides with the Royal Water Festival. Sampeah Preah Khae takes place on the last day of the Royal Water Festival. Cambodians usually set up an array of offerings in the form of fruits that are popular with rabbits, such as Ambok, banana, coconut, yam, sweet potato and drinks. They light incense in front of their homes at night before gathering at pagodas at midnight for the third ceremony, Ak Ambok where they remember the life of Pothisat the moon rabbit. Once consumed, adults usually take a handful of ambok to feed it into the mouth of younger children as a sign of care and goodwill. While holding their noses, children open their mouth and look at the Moon, usually making a wish, to remember the generosity of the altruistic rabbit as a model. Apart from these domestic rituals, Khmer people usually enjoy gambling as a group during the festival.

The full moon determines the date of the entire festival. Cambodian people celebrate these two festivals around this time because this is also when bananas, coconuts, yam, and sweet potatoes are in abundance. After the Sampeah Preah Khae ceremony, devout Buddhists gather at a pagoda at midnight for the rites associated with Ak Ambok.

== History of the dragon Makor ==
Makor is a Sanskrit word meaning "sea dragon" or "strange sea creature". This word is the origin of the word "mugger" (गुंडा) in Hindi. In Hindi, the crocodile is called मकर (Makar or Makarak). It is said that there was Asura, an ascetic named Vritra, who ruled over dragons and stopped all water from flooding, which caused drought across the region. People began to pray to the gods for help. Immediately, a beautiful angel untied her hair and came down to create a water source in the area. People were very happy and named her "Goddess Ganga". At that moment, a single strand of hair of the Ganges fell to the ground and it became the sea dragon or water-monster, Makara or Makor in Khmer, which was stronger than any other animal in the world. It also swallowed up all the creatures it encountered, whether humans, Singha as lions, or Nāga dragons.

Since no one was able to subdue the monster, Shiva came down to face the Makor, promising the Ganges that if the god Shiva could catch the monster, she would marry him. "Preah Eyso" as Shiva also came down to face "Makor" for many days, still not knowing how to win or lose.

"Kongkea" also told "Eyso" that if you want to subdue me, you can only lift me up and put me on the palm of your hand and the goddess "Kongkea" used her hair to drop into the water to suck out all the water and leave it alone on land. The Makor, which was an aquatic animal, turned into a Singha as a lion's foot. Shiva, with great weight, sat and pressed on the beast, unable to withstand the weight of him. "Makor" was willing to surrender to Shiva due to the ferocious power of the beast. Shiva held the animal's mouth into the elephant's trunk and the beast promised to spit it out. Since then, Shiva has used animals as vehicles. Makor transformed to Gajasimha and changed names to "Koch Jor Sey" which is related to "Reach Sey". The King Lion, protector of Kingdom of Cambodia made the symbols of the royal arms of Cambodia. The dragon boat races can be seen as a reenactment of these mythological battles.

=== Program ===
The Royal Water Festival, which lasts for three days, was recorded for the first time under the reign of King Norodom in 1873 and follows a precise ritual. Dragon boats from every major pagoda in Cambodia, come to Phnom Penh and compete for three days during daylight in elimination rounds until the final race on the third day. In the evening around 6:00 pm, a prayer is said for peace to Preah Mae Kongkea and a candle is lit by the King. Following this prayer, illuminated floating boats parade on the Tonle Sap, accompanied by fireworks. The illuminated floating boats represent the various royal ministries of Cambodia.

=== Classification of the dragon boats ===
It is difficult to make a precise list of the various dragon boats involved in the race. The earliest French documents show boat carvings from the temples of Banteay Chhmar and the temple of Bayon. Khmer architecture is used to design various types of boats, such as:

World's longest dragon boat
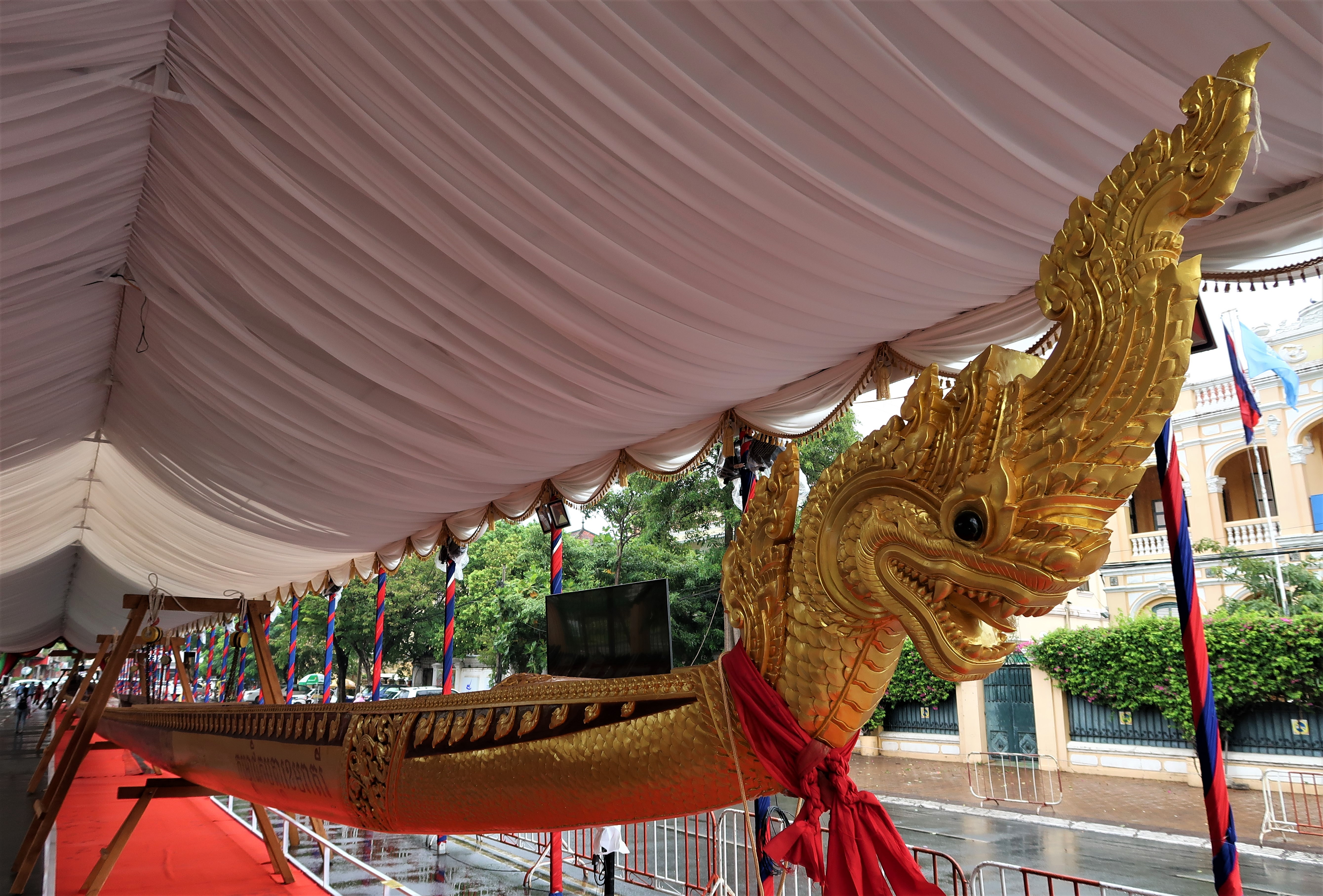
- Cambodia breaks Guinness World Records for the world's longest dragon boat (Kambojika Putta Khemara Tarei)

- The Makara boat
- The Nāga boat
- The Five Head Naga boats
- The Elephant boat
- The Crocodile boats
- The Hanuman boat riding giant
- The Suvannamaccha boat or Mermaid boat
- The Hang Meas (Khmer Golden Phoenix-like Bird) boat
- The Peacocks boat
- The Garuda boat

=== Recent history ===
Phnom Penh resumed Water Festival celebrations in 1990, following a 20-year break under the Lon Nol regime and then the genocidal Khmer Rouge. A few of Phnom Penh's many foreign residents started to participate in the featured boat races in the mid-1990s, though in the first year of participation, their boat capsized along with two other teams in the wake of a larger ship. In 2008, five rowers drowned, and in 2009, a rower drowned during the boat races.

The celebration turned tragic in 2010, when thousands became trapped and a Stampede#Human stampedes and crushes and crowd crush occurred on the bridge between Phnom Penh and Diamond Island, killing 351 people and injuring 395 more. Rumors spread that it was caused by fear of a coming storm or electrical shock from faulty wiring. The authorities ultimately laid blame on the swaying of the bridge.

Phnom Penh authorities came under fire in 2016 for sanitation, after videos of cleaning crews sweeping trash into the Tonle Sap incited anger on social media.

Upriver dams and a devastating drought in 2019 brought the Mekong to its lowest level ever recorded. The combination has left the Tonle Sap Lake, Southeast Asia's largest fresh-water lake, in crisis. The reversal of the Tonle Sap river lasted just six weeks, which may have consequences on fishing in the region.

== See also ==
- Public holidays in Cambodia
