= Dragon boat =

Ancient Chinese boat

Dragon Boat
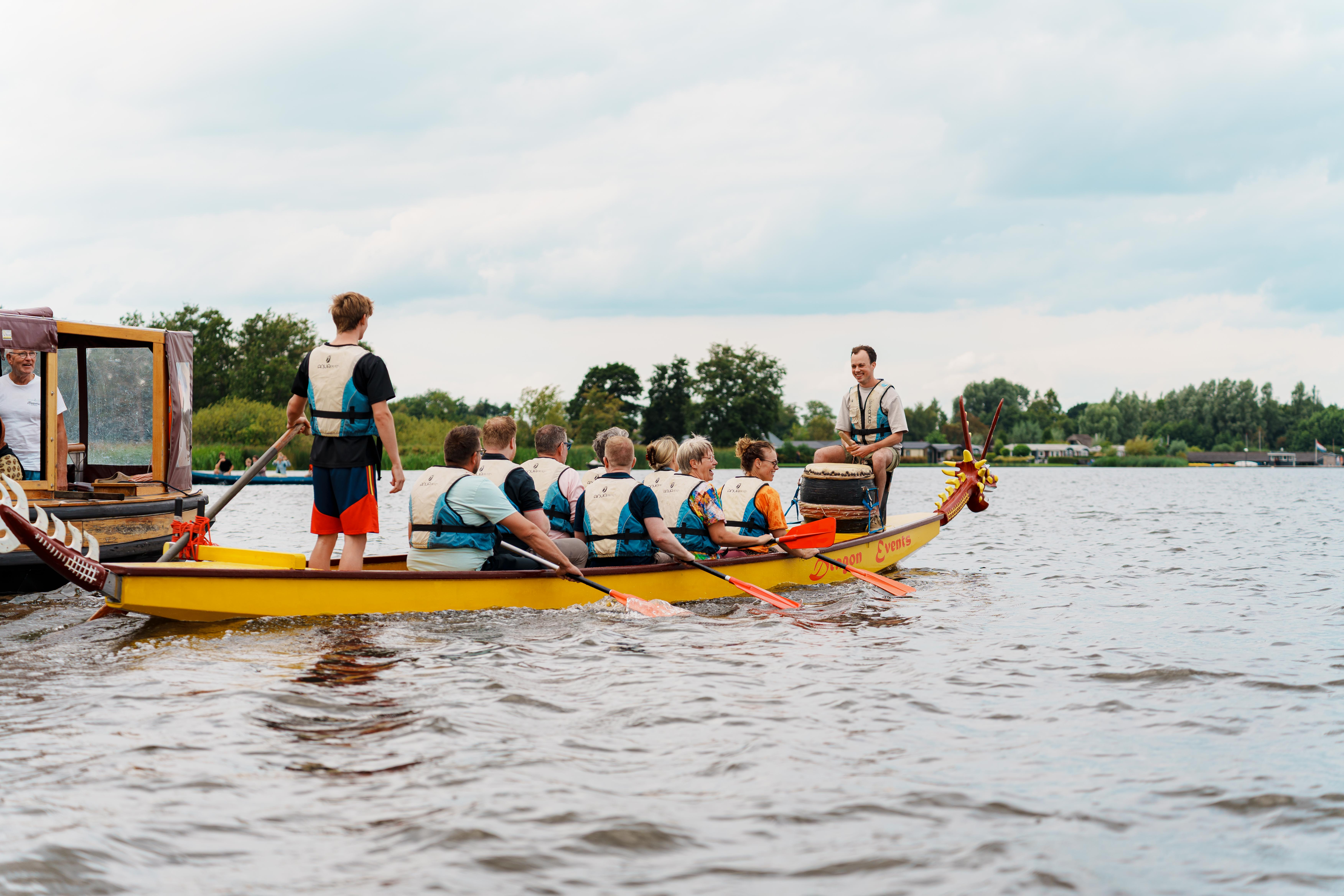
- A dragon boat with rowers crossing the water in Giethoorn, Netherlands
- Highest governing body: International Dragon Boat Federation
- First developed: Ancient China

Characteristics
- Contact: No
- Team members: 22 (regulation)
- Type: Watercraft paddle sport
- Equipment: Dragon boat, paddles, drum

Presence
- Country or region: Worldwide
- Olympic: No
- World Games: 2005 (invitational), 2009 (invitational), 2025

Dragon boat
- Traditional Chinese: 龍舟
- Simplified Chinese: 龙舟
Transcriptions
Standard Mandarin
- Hanyu Pinyin: lóngzhōu
- Wade–Giles: lung^{2}-chou^{1}
- IPA: [lʊ̌ŋ.ʈʂóʊ]
Southern Min
- Hokkien POJ: lêng-chiu

Alternative Chinese name
- Traditional Chinese: 龍船
- Simplified Chinese: 龙船
Transcriptions
Standard Mandarin
- Hanyu Pinyin: lóngchuán
- Wade–Giles: lung^{2}-chʻuan^{2}
- IPA: [lʊ̌ŋ.ʈʂʰwǎn]
Yue: Cantonese
- Yale Romanization: lùhngsyùhn
Southern Min
- Hokkien POJ: liông-chûn

A dragon boat is a human-powered watercraft that originated in the Pearl River Delta region of southern China's Guangdong Province. These were made of teak, but in other parts of China different kinds of wood are used. It is one of a family of traditional paddled long boats found throughout Asia, Africa, the Pacific islands, and Puerto Rico. The sport of dragon boat racing has its roots in an ancient folk ritual of contending villagers, which dates back 2000 years throughout southern China, and even further to the original games of Olympia in ancient Greece. Both dragon boat racing and the ancient Olympiad included aspects of religious observances and community celebrations, along with competitions.

Dragon boat racing has been a traditional Chinese paddled watercraft activity for over 2000 years and began as a modern international sport in Hong Kong in 1976. These boats are typically made of carbon fiber, fiberglass, and other lightweight materials. For competition events, dragon boats are generally rigged with decorative Chinese dragon heads and tails. At other times (such as during training), decorative regalia is usually removed, although the drum often remains aboard for drummers to practice. For races, there are 18-20 people in a standard boat, and 8-10 in a small boat, not including the steersperson (sweep) and the drummer.

In December 2007, the central government of the People's Republic of China added the Dragon Boat Festival, along with the Qingming and Mid-Autumn festivals, to the schedule of national holidays.

== Design and construction ==
The International Dragon Boat Federation defines a dragon boat, within competition regulations, to be: "a long displacement boat of an open design, that is based upon a rib-less carvel form of hull construction, with the following distinguishing characteristics; no stem, hard chine bilge; W in cross section, minimum freeboard, punt-like entry and exit; rocketed keel that is set back from the twin rail boards and curved sheet line with upsweep extremities".

Dragon boats vary in size: medium-sized boats can measure about 38 feet (11.5 meters), whereas larger boats can measure up to 90 feet (27.4 meters) in length. The width and depth of the boat also varies, changing according to factors like the boat's length and purpose, as well as the number of people in its crew. Some dragon boat craftsmen may also alter the width of the boats depending on the expertise of its paddlers, with narrower boats being constructed for more skilled dragon boaters.

The material used to build the main body of a dragon boat is diverse and has varied over the years. Before 1911, Ge wood, imported from countries like Myanmar, Thailand, and Vietnam was used. From 1911 towards the end of the 1990s, dragon boats had been built using pine wood imported from the United States. Since 2000, cedar wood from the Guizhou province of China had been used. Today, the standard materials used to build the hull of these dragon boats are usually either teak wood or fiberglass.

Teak wood is considerably adept at handling moisture. For a majority of the year, dragon boats are stored out of the water, on dry land, where they tend to shrink slightly once dried. When they are reintroduced back into the sea, teak allows their joints to expand, which allows the boat to close any gaps and further strengthen itself. Sometime in the 1990s, China began its advocacy for the protection of its forests, causing a shortage in large timber resources. Following this, China began to see a rise in fiberglass dragon boats which were often lighter and faster. Over time, dragon boats made of fiberglass surpassed those made of wood, becoming a popular choice and the national standard for dragon boats in China. As a result, while wooden paddles and teak wood boats are still used from time to time, dragon boat athletes often train regularly on fiberglass boats, with paddles made of carbon fiber.

The head and tail of a dragon is typically made of camphor wood. The design of the dragon heads vary according to its location, as each region has their own specific features and colors to dedicate to it. The head and tail are often hand-carved, likely with a chisel and hammer, before being hand-painted. Such heads usually feature a pair of bulging eyes, two jumbo nostrils, a long snout, a stuck out tongue, 'feathers' or 'hairs' that appear frozen in a wave-like motion, and ferocious jaws that feature sharp, white teeth. The head leads to the long, sleek, and low body of the dragon boat which represents the dragon's back. This part also features a W-shaped belly that provides suction onto the water and helps to stabilize the boat. On its stern is a curled tail with minutely carved scales.

Many consider the building of these dragon boats to be a combination of various art forms, including carpentry work, wood carving, oil painting, and marine architecture theory. They also involve a fair amount of labor division where various craftsmen work on different parts of the boat. For example, wooden furniture makers would be engaged to carve the dragon's head and tail, while ship builders would be engaged to work on the dragon's body.

== History ==
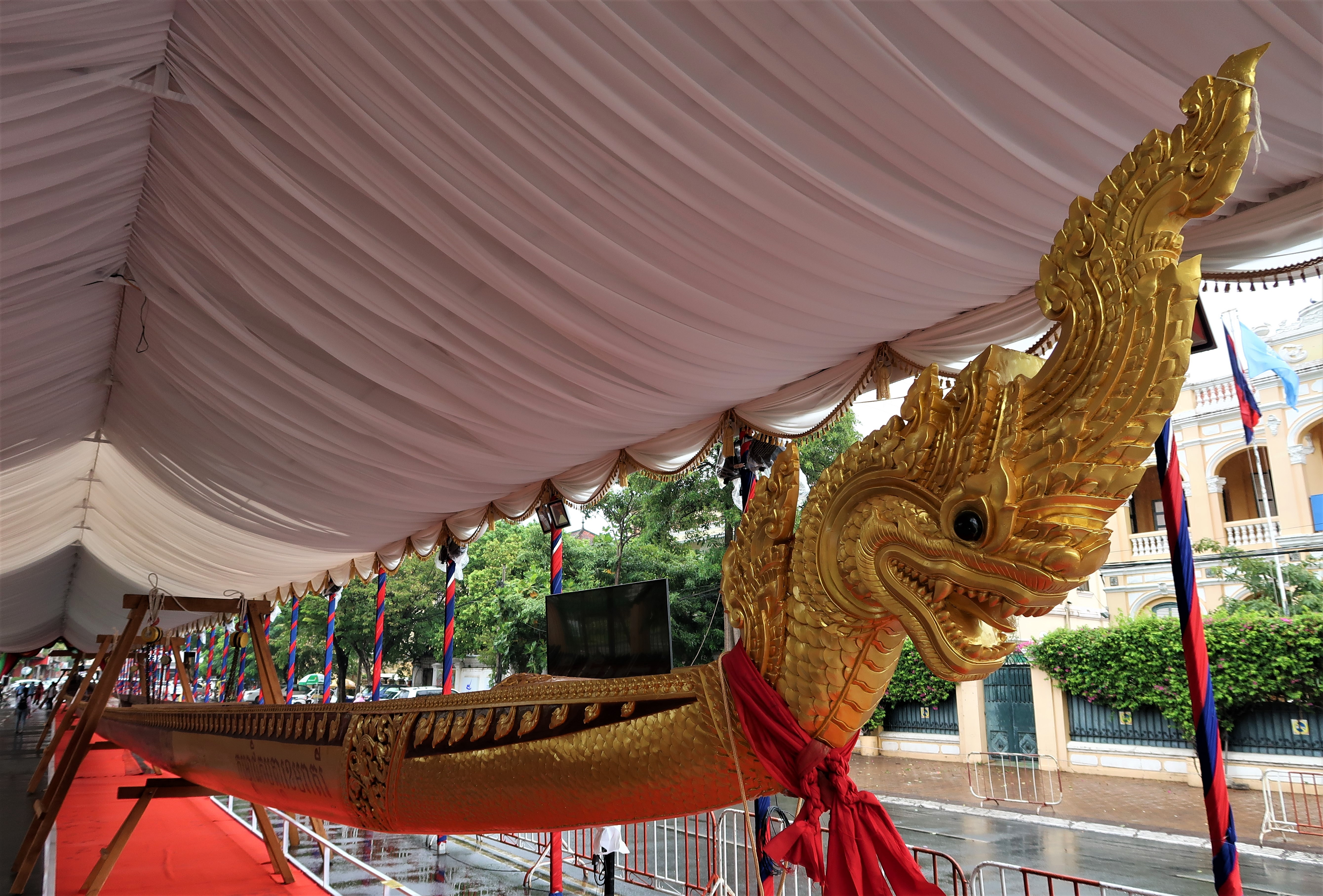
World's longest dragon boat (Kambojika Putta Khemara Tarei) on display next to Royal Palace in Phnom Penh, Cambodia.

Similar to the use of outrigger canoes or Polynesian va'a, dragon boat racing has a rich background of ancient ceremonial, ritualistic and religious traditions, and thus, the modern competitive aspect is but one small part of this complex dragon boat culture. The use of dragon boats for racing and dragon ceremonies is believed by scholars, sinologists, and anthropologists to have originated in southern central China more than 2500 years ago, in Dongting Lake and along the banks of the Chang Jiang (now called the Yangtze) during the same era when the games of ancient Greece were being established at Olympia. Dragon boat racing has been practiced continuously since this period as the basis for annual water rituals and festival celebrations, and for the traditional veneration of the Chinese dragon water deity. The celebration was an important part of the ancient Chinese agricultural society, celebrating the summer rice planting. Dragon boat racing was historically situated in the Chinese subcontinent's southern-central "rice bowl"; where there were rice paddies, so too there were dragon boats.

Of the twelve animals which make up the traditional Chinese zodiac, only the Dragon is a mythical creature. All the rest are non-mythical animals, yet all twelve of the zodiac creatures were well known to members of ancient Chinese agrarian communities. Dragons were traditionally believed to be the rulers of water on earth: rivers, lakes, and seas; they were also thought to dominate the waters of the heavens: clouds, mists, and rains. There are earth dragons, mountain dragons, and sky or celestial dragons (Tian Long) in Chinese tradition. Mythical dragons and serpents are also found widely in many cultures around the world.

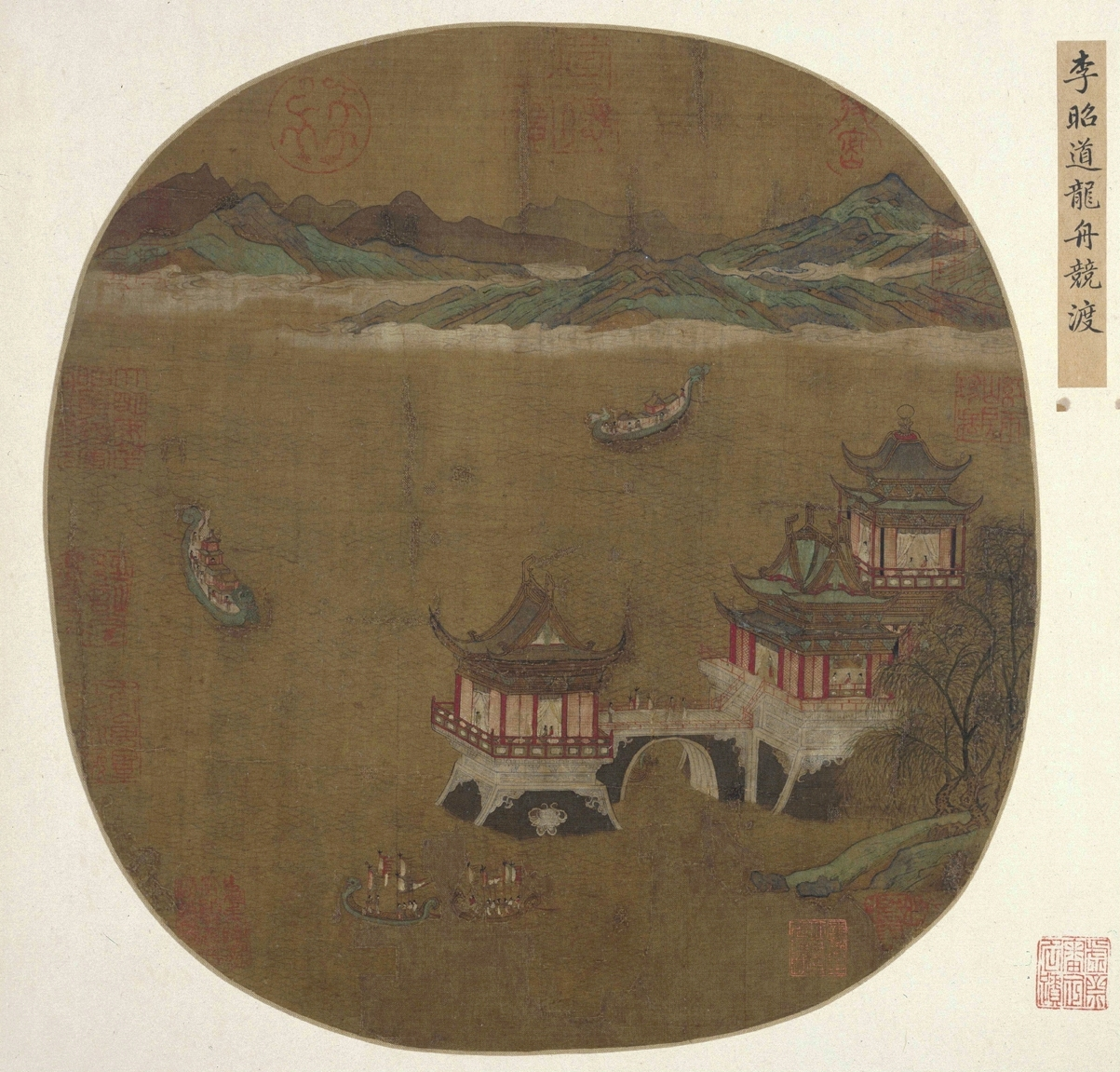
Tang dynasty painting of a dragon boat race attributed to Li Zhaodao (675-758)

Traditional dragon boat racing, in China, coincides with the 5th day of the 5th Chinese lunar month (varying from late May to June on the modern Gregorian Calendar). The summer solstice occurs around 21 June and is the reason why Chinese refer to their festival as "Duan Wu" or "Duen Ng". Both the sun and the dragon are considered to be male (the moon and the mythical phoenix, however, are considered to be female). The sun and the dragon are thought to be most potent during this time of the year, which provides a cause for observing this through ritual celebrations such as dragon boat racing. It is also the time of year when rice seedlings must be transplanted in rice paddy fields to allow for wet rice cultivation. Wu or Ng refers to the sun at its highest position in the sky during the day, the meridian of 'high noon'. Duan or Duen refers to upright or directly overhead. Thus, Duan Wu is an ancient reference to the maximum position of the sun in the northern hemisphere, the longest day of the year or the summer solstice.

Venerating the dragon deity was meant to avert misfortune and calamity and to encourage rainfall, which is needed for the fertility of the crops and thus, the prosperity of an agrarian way of life. Celestial dragons were considered the controllers of rain, monsoons, winds, and clouds. The Emperor was "The Dragon" or the "Son of Heaven", and Chinese people sometimes refer to themselves as "dragons" because of its spirit of strength and vitality. Unlike dragons in European mythology, which are typically considered to be evil and demonic, Asian dragons are regarded as wholesome and benevolent, and thus worthy of veneration, not slaying. If rainfall is insufficient, however, drought and famine can result. Veneration of dragons in China seems to be associated with annual rituals to ensure life-giving water and bountiful rice harvests in south-central China.

Another ritual called Awakening of the Dragon involves a Taoist priest dotting the bulging eyes of the carved dragon head attached to the boat. Doing so symbolizes the dragon ending its slumber and reenergizing its spirit, or ch'i. In modern dragon boat festivals, a representative can be invited to step forward to dot the eyes on a dragon boat head with a brush dipped in red paint.

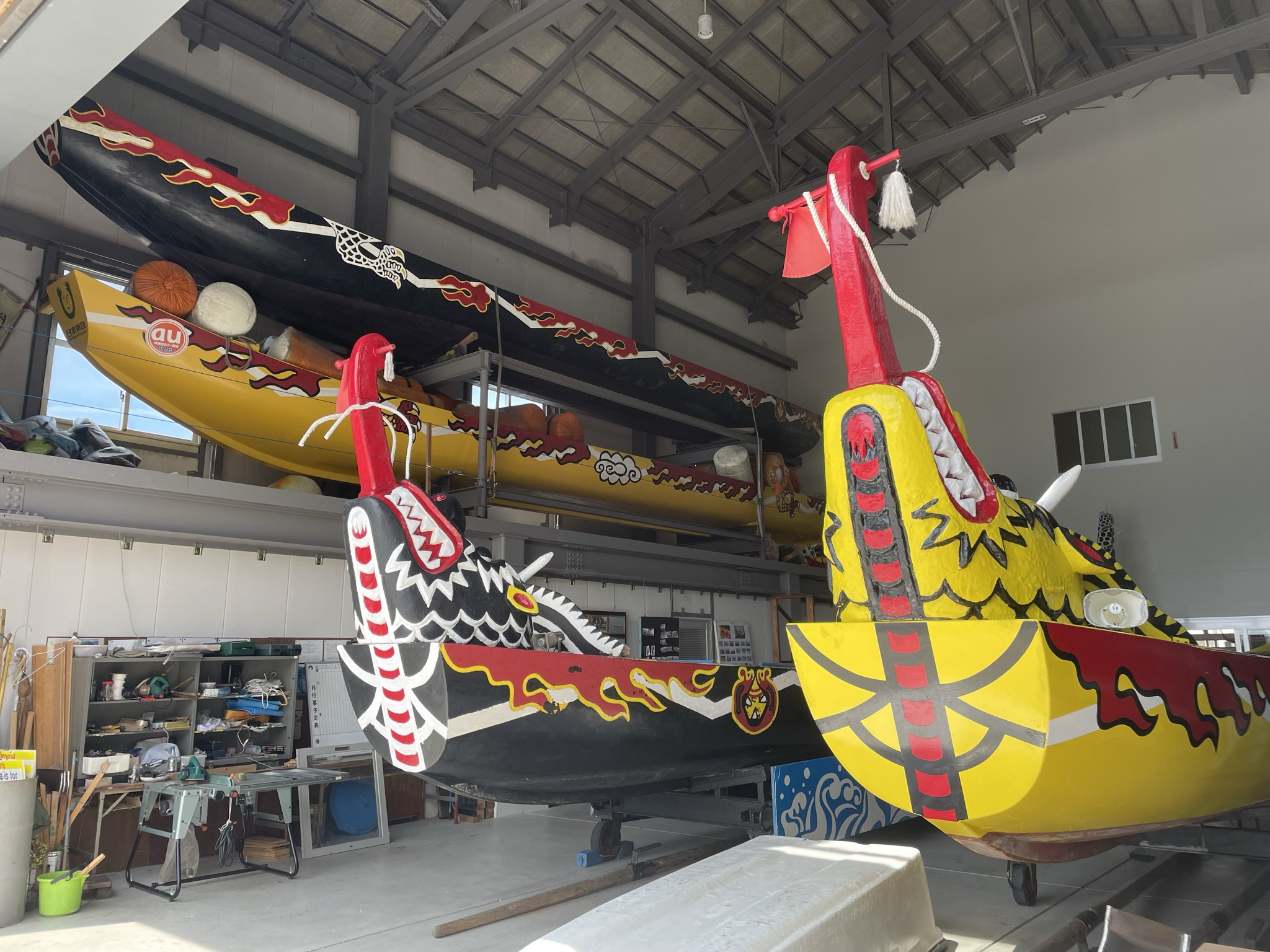
Dragon boats used in "Naha Hari/Hare" race (Ryukyu Islands)

Not understanding the significance of Duanwu, 19th-century European observers of the racing ritual referred to the associated spectacle as a "dragon boat festival". This is the term that has become known in the West. Dragon boat racing, like Duanwu, is observed and celebrated in many areas of east Asia with a significant population of ethnic Chinese such as Singapore, Malaysia, and the Riau Islands, as well as having been adopted by the Ryukyu Islands since ancient times. The date on which races were held is referred to as the "double fifth", since Duanwu is reckoned as the fifth day of the fifth lunar month, which often falls in the Gregorian calendar month of June and occasionally in May or July. Duanwu is reckoned annually in accordance with the traditional calendar system of China, which is a combination of solar and lunar cycles, unlike the solar-based Gregorian calendar system.

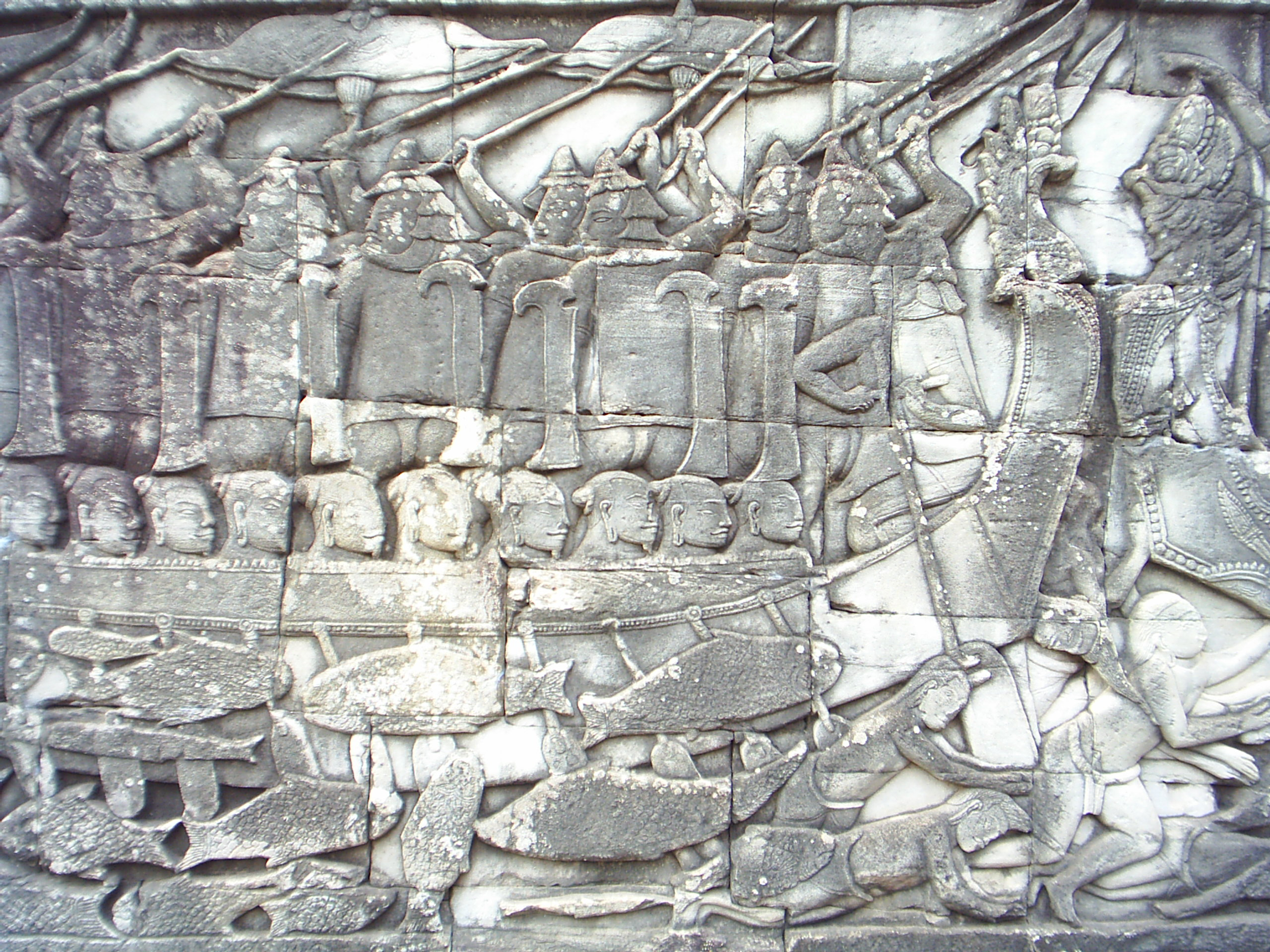
Bas relief scene from Bayon temple depicting a naval battle using dragon boats between the Khmer Empire and Champa.

The Khmer Empire used dragon boats in their naval battles. Today, Cambodia honors the use of dragon boats by the Khmer Empire's navy by hosting dragon boat competitions at the Bon Om Touk water festival. Laos which emerged from the Khmer Empire organizes a similar dragon boat festival on the Mekong River called Boun Suang Huea. The world's longest dragon boat is located in Cambodia and known as the Kambojika Putta Khemara Tarei.

== Crew ==
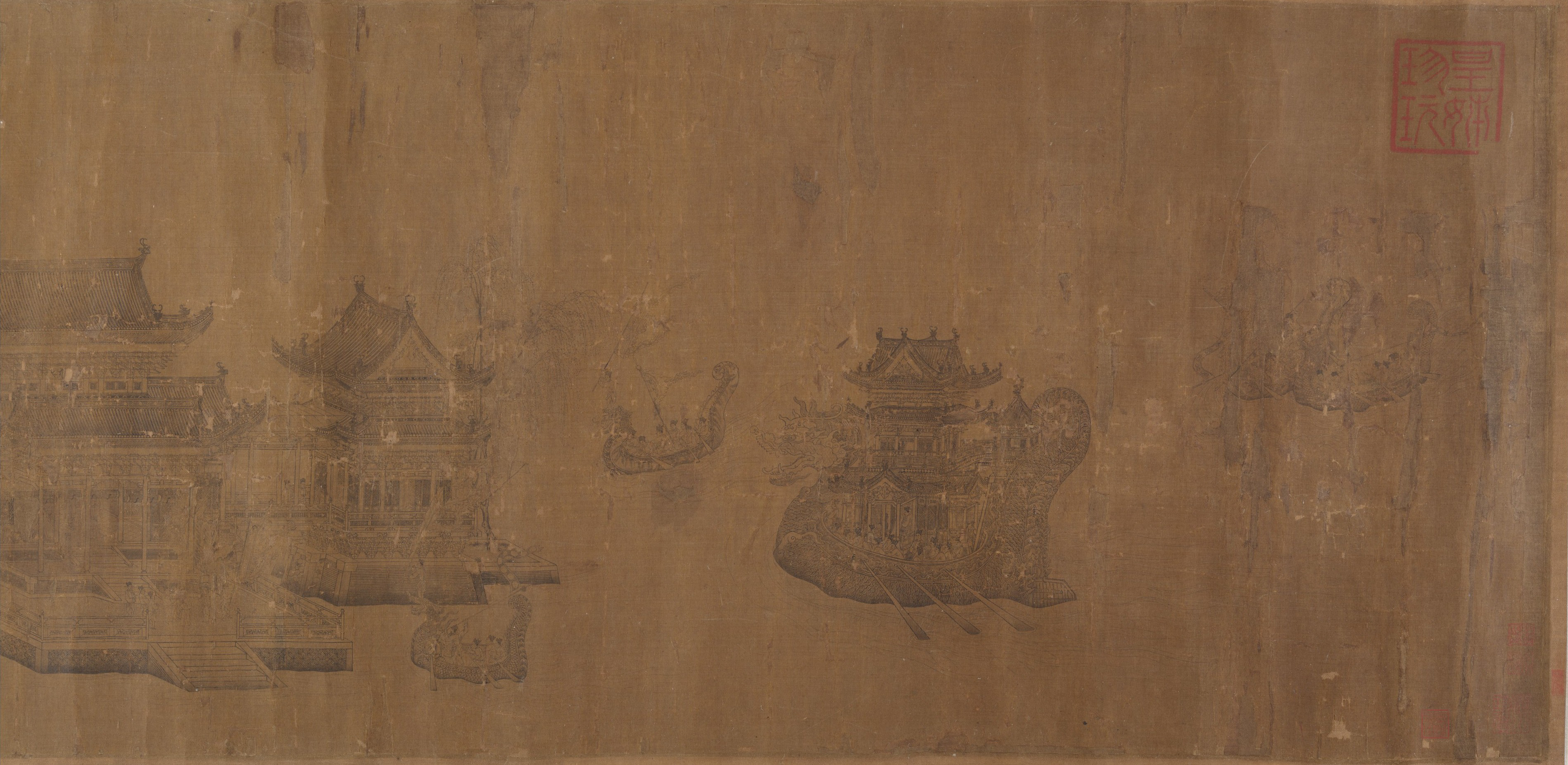
Dragon boats with a tower and crew (14th c.)

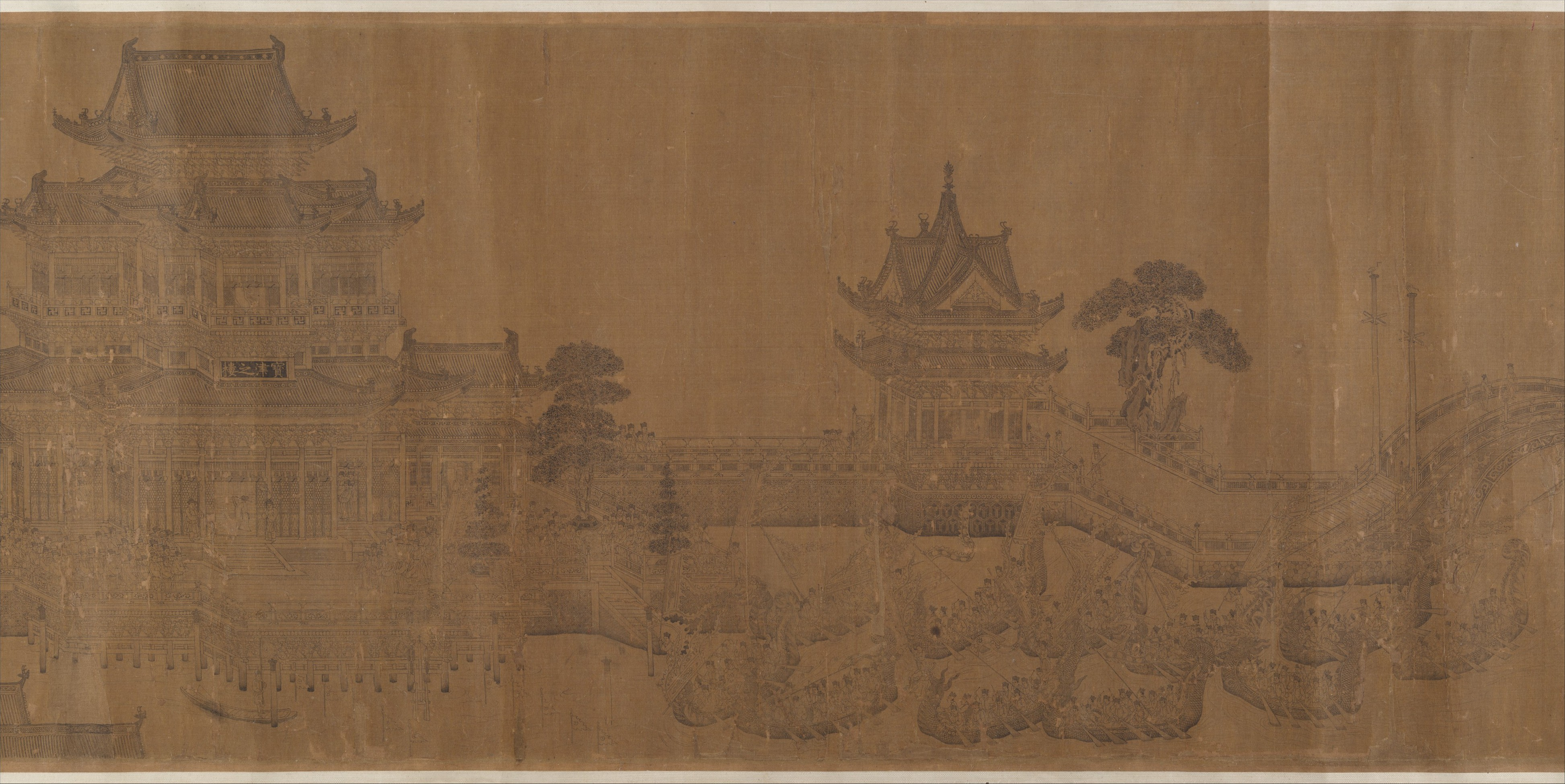
Dragon boat crews (14th c.)

The crew of a standard dragon boat typically consists of 22 team members: 20 paddlers in pairs facing toward the bow of the boat, 1 drummer or caller at the bow facing toward the paddlers, and 1 steerer standing at the rear of the boat. Dragon boats, however, do vary in length and the crew size changes accordingly, from small dragon boats with only 10 paddlers up to traditional boats which have upwards of 50 paddlers, plus drummer(s) and steerer.

=== Drummer ===
The pulsation of the drum beats produced by the drummer may be considered the "heartbeat" of the dragon boat. The drummer leads the paddlers throughout a race using the rhythmic drum beat to indicate the frequency and synchronization of all the paddlers' strokes (that is, the cadence, picking up or accelerating the pace, slowing the rate, etc.). The drummer may issue commands to the crew through a combination of hand signals and voice calls, and also generally exhorts the crew to perform at their peak. A drummer is typically mandatory during racing events, but if he or she is not present during training, it is typical for the sweep to direct the crew during a race. The drummer's role is both tactical and ceremonial. In official competitions, such as world championships, drummers must physically beat the drum, else the team may be issued a penalty. In other events or practices, the drummer of an experienced team may not hit the drum, as the team can paddle naturally together, without a drum beat.

Good drummers should be able to synchronize their drumming with the strokes of the leading pair of paddlers, rather than the other way around.

=== Paddlers ===
Pairs of paddlers sit facing forward in the boat, and use a specific type of paddle which, unlike equipment used in rowing, is not rigged to the boat in any way. The paddlers face the direction of boat-movement; dragon boaters thus "paddle," like a canoe, while rowers "row", travelling opposite the way they face as in Olympic sculling.

The paddle now accepted by the International Dragon Boat Organization has a standardized, fixed blade surface area and distinctive shape derived from the paddle shapes characteristic of that used by inhabitants of the Pearl River delta region of Guangdong Province, China adjacent to Hong Kong. The IDBF Paddle Specification 202a (PS202a) has straight flared edges and circular arced shoulders, based geometrically on an equilateral triangle positioned between the blade face and the neck of the shaft.

The first pair of paddlers, called "pacers," "strokes" or "timers," set the pace for the team and are responsible for synchronizing their strokes with one another, because it is critical that all paddlers are synchronized. The direction of the dragon boat while racing is set by the steerer, but for docking and other maneuvers, individual paddlers may be asked to paddle (while others either stop the boat or rest) according to the commands given by the drummer or steerer.

There are generally three different strokes used by paddlers: a (normal) forward stroke, a backstroke, and a draw stroke.

=== Steerer ===
The direction of a dragon boat's movement is controlled by the steerer standing in the back of the boat. Many terms exist for the person steering the boat, such as steerer, steersperson, steerman, sweep, and helm.

Dragon boat crew in motion

The steerer manipulates a long (typically 9-feet) straight oar, called a steering oar. The steering oar is situated in a mechanism that holds the oar in place, called oar lock. The oar lock can be in a variety of designs, so long as it holds the oar in place and allows it to pivot. It is housed on top of the steering arm, which sticks out perpendicularly on the back-left of a dragon boat.

The oar is used to both steer the boat as it is moving and adjust the positioning of the boat. To steer, a steerer will put the blade of the oar into the water and either push the handle away from him/her, or pull it toward him/her. Doing so will turn the boat right or left, respectively.

A steerer can also use the steering oar to adjust the position of the boat by cranking. When a steerer cranks the steering oar, the stern of the boat moves either to the left or right, spinning the boat. This is typically executed to turn the boat around at practice or to ensure a boat is lined up straight and pointing directly down a racecourse.

A steerer uses calls to direct the paddlers. The steerer may call "paddles up" to prepare to paddle and "take it away!" to commence paddling. The steerer may use other calls such as "hold the boat" for the paddlers to brake using their paddles or "let it ride" for them to lift their paddles out of the water.

The steerer also calls the demands in the race for paddlers to better their placement and time in the event that they are participating in.

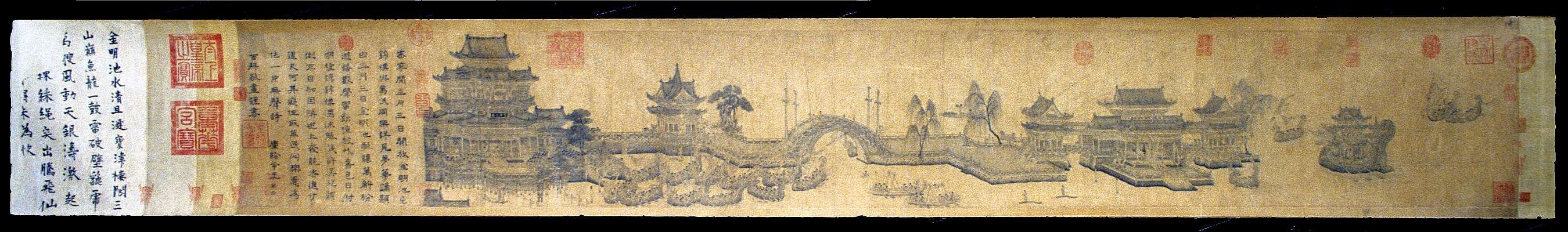
Dragon Boat Regatta by Wang Zhenpeng (14th c., Yuan dynasty)

== Racing ==
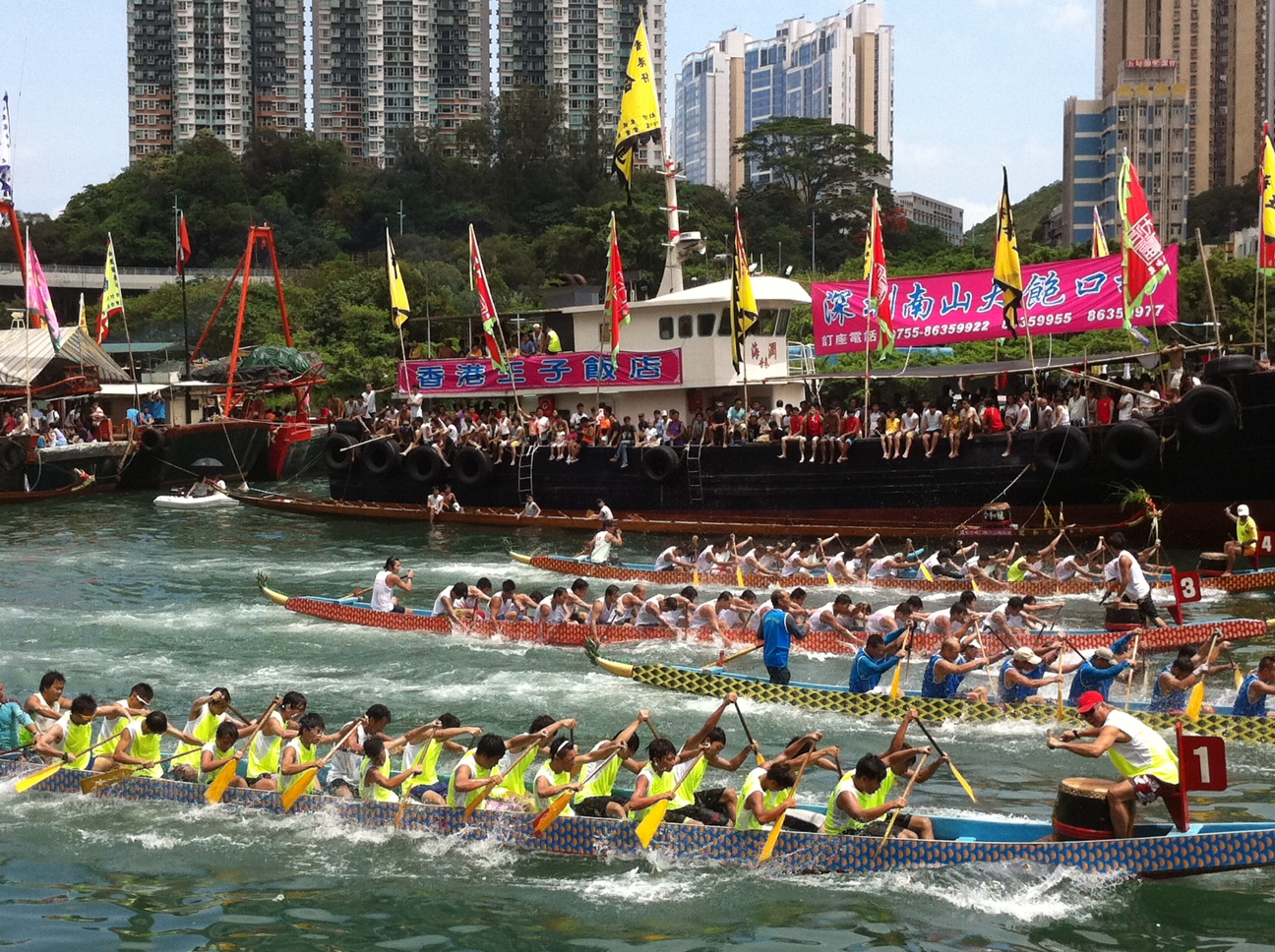
Dragon boats racing in Hong Kong

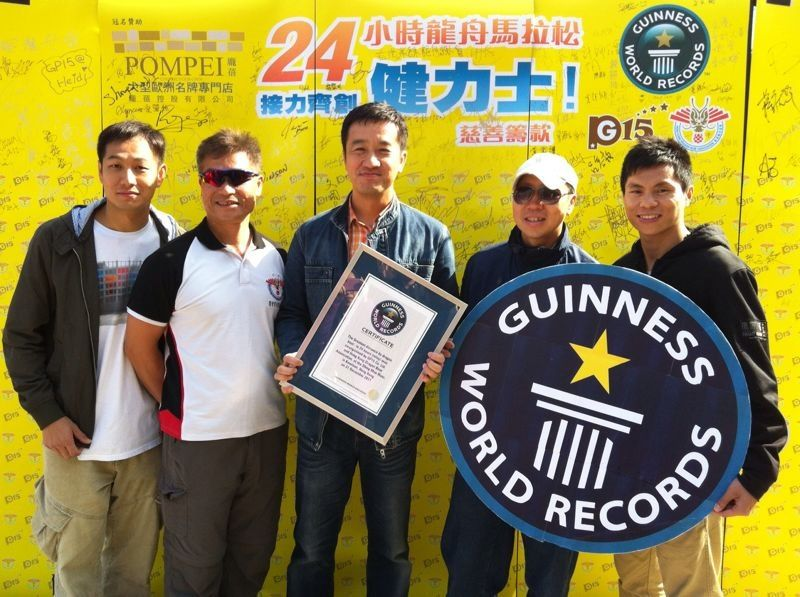
HKDBA team being awarded the Guinness World Record in Hong Kong

Modern dragon boat racing is organized at the international level by the International Dragon Boat Federation (IDBF), the world governing body for the sport. The IDBF is a member of the Global Association of International Sports Federations and is a founding federation of the AIMS Group (Alliance of Independent Recognized Members of Sport) within GAISF. AIMS is an IOC-Recognized Multi Sports Organization. The International Canoe Federation (ICF) also has a dragon boat program for those of its Member Canoe Federations with an interest in dragon boat. Both Sport and Festival racing are very competitive and many paddlers train year round, using paddling machines or pools in addition to on-water sessions.

A festival race is typically a sprint event of several hundred meters, with 500 meters being the most common. Races measuring 200, 1000, and 2000 meters are also standard distances in international competition. Races measuring 2000 meters are normally held on a 500-meter course, requiring teams to do two loops. Teams start and end at the same end of the course, and complete three 180-degree turns. Other distances may also be used in local festivals, such as 100 or 250 meters, or another distance, depending on the size of the body of water.

== Organizations, recognition and popular culture ==
The established International Federation for dragon boat sport is the International Dragon Boat Federation (IDBF). In 2007, the IDBF was recognized as a member of SportAccord (the former General Association of International Sports Federations, GAISF) which is part of the Olympic Movement, after SportAccord considered the historical and cultural backgrounds and identities of dragon boat sports.

IDBF member associations or federations have been established in 89 countries or territories since 1991. The IDBF is not presently an Olympic International Federation of the International Olympic Committee (IOC), but the IOC is currently considering the IDBF application for Olympic Federation status.

The International Canoe Federation, an IOC-recognized entity that governs many canoeing disciplines has also started to sanction Dragon Boat events. The ICF Dragon Boat World Championships have been held since 2006. The Canadian Dragonboat Championships is an annual event held in Ontario, Canada.

== Accidents and incidents ==
- On 23 November 2007, a dragon boat capsized after colliding with a pontoon in Tonlé Sap, Cambodia killing five paddlers.
- On 17 January 2010, a dragon boat capsized while training in Penang, Malaysia killing six paddlers on board.
- On 11 February 2011, a dragon boat capsized while training due to wind in Præstø, Denmark killing one paddler.
- On 9 June 2016, three people drowned after their dragon boat capsized during a race in Fujian Province, China.
- On 22 April 2018, seventeen people drowned in a dragon boat accident on the Taohua River in Guilin, China.
- On 25 September 2019, seven people drowned near Boracay, Philippines.

== See also ==
- Nouka Baich
- Swan boat (racing)
- War canoe racing
