= Amudalavalasa =

Amadalavalasa
- Town
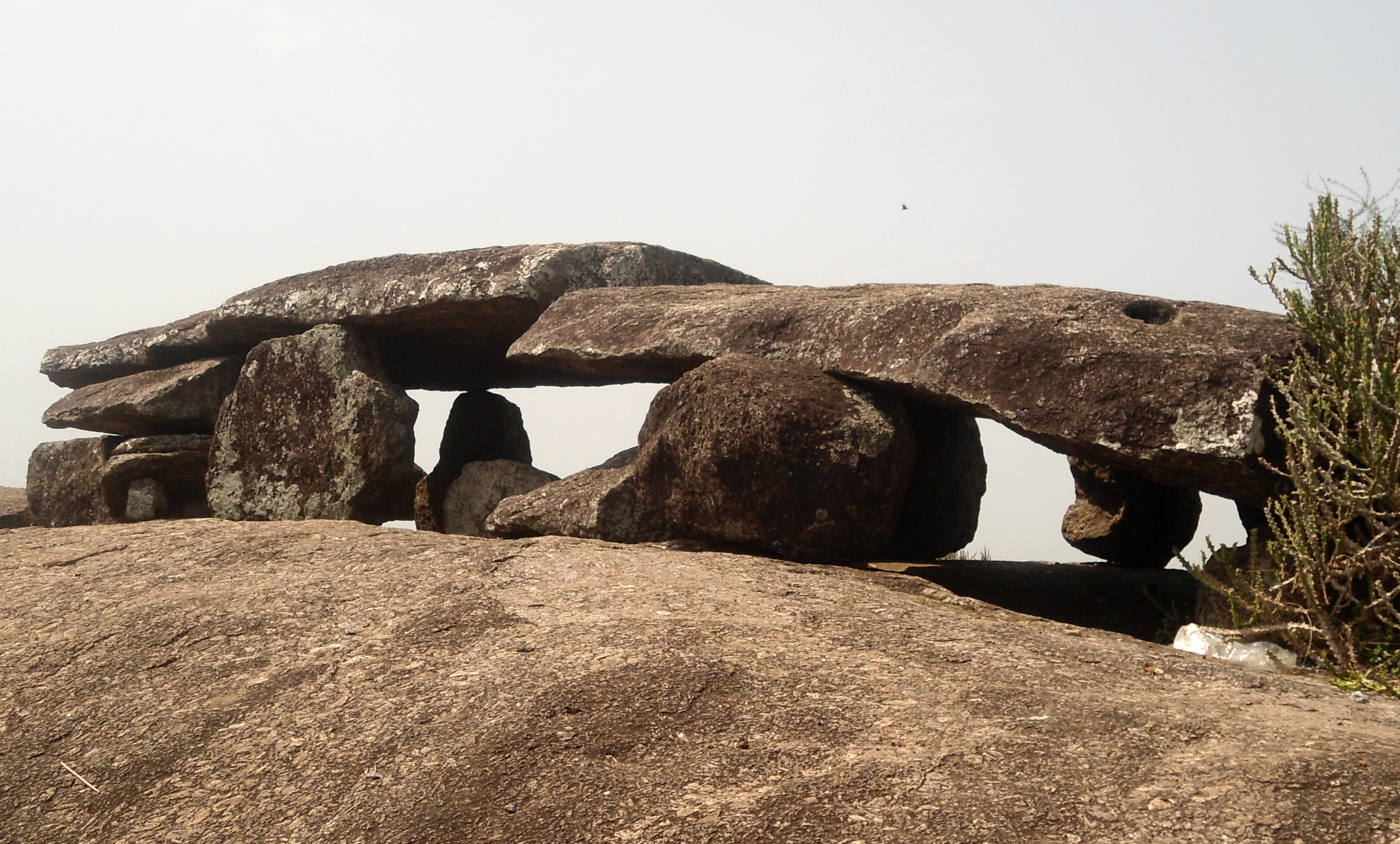
- Megalithic Dolmen (said to be world's large single capstone as a dolmen with 36 ft in length and 14 ft in width and 2 ft thickness) of early Iron Age at Dannanapeta near Amadalavalsa

- Location in Andhra Pradesh, India
- Coordinates: 18.4167°N 83.9000°E
- Country: India
- State: Andhra Pradesh
- District: Srikakulam
- Founder: Budumuru Navajeevan kumar

Government
  - Type: Municipality
  - Body: Amudalavalasa Municipality, SUDA
  - MLA: Thammineni Seetharam

Area
  - Total: 19.65 km^{2} (7.59 sq mi)

Population (2011)
  - Total: 39,799

Languages
  - Official: Telugu
- Time zone: UTC+5:30 (IST)
- PIN: 532185
- Telephone code: 08942
- Vehicle Registration: AP30 (former); AP39 (from 30 January 2019)
- Website: Amudalavalasa Municipality

Amadalavalasa is a town in Srikakulam district of the Indian state of Andhra Pradesh. It is a municipality and also the mandal headquarters of Amadalavalasa mandal. The town is spread over an area of 19.65 km^{2} (7.59 mi^{2}), which is under the jurisdiction of Visakhapatnam Metropolitan Region Development Authority. Srikakulam Road railway station is situated at Amadalavalasa.

== Geography ==
Amadalavalasa is located at 18.4167°N 83.9000°E. It has an average elevation of 29 metres (98 feet).

Danthapuri remnants

== History ==
Amadalavalasa means 'the town of castor oil'. During the times of Ashoka, this place was called Herandapalli. Heranda in Sanskrit means castor oil. Ironically, once upon a time castor oil plants being grown or castor oil being produced in this place.

Iron Age habitation

Evidence of early historic man and his activities have been recently discovered on the hills of Sangamayya Konda, in Amudalavalasa mandal.

Buddhism and Jainism

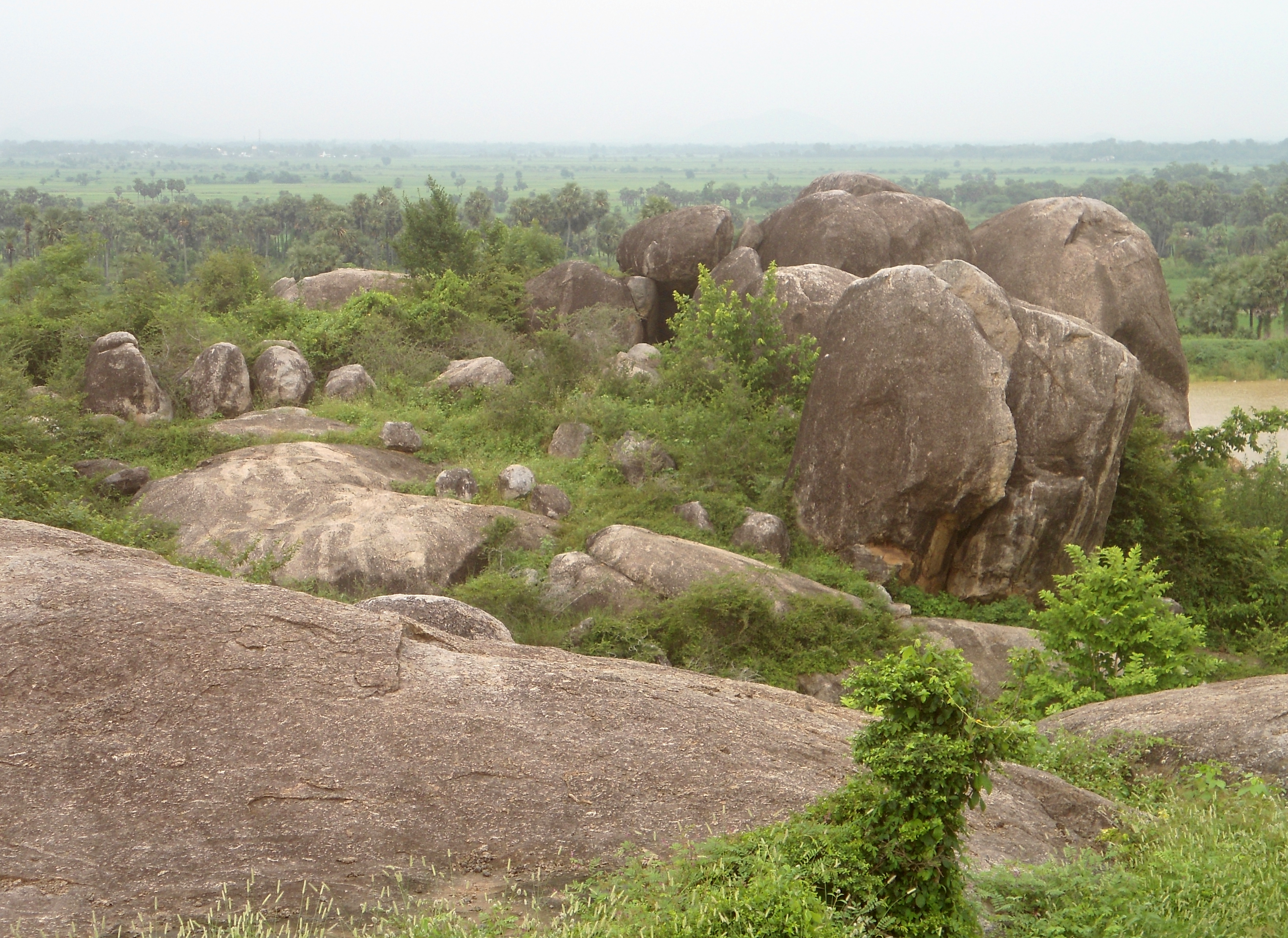
Prehistoric Rock shelters at Chittivalasa village near Amudalavalasa

Sangamayya Konda

Sangamayya Konda is 3 km from Amudalavalasa. It was a Buddhist site and is known for the Jain vestiges and Buddhist monasteries excavated recently. A freelance archaeologist conducted recent explorations on the hills of Sangamayya Konda and found several pre-historic Dolmen, Menhir, Cave, Caverns and Cisterns.

Danthapuri (Danthavarapukota)

Danthapuri (Danthavarapukota) is one of the historical places near Amadalavalasa. This village is between Amudalavalasa and Hiramandalam. Ancient Buddha stupas are present in this place.

== Government and politics ==
Amadalavalasa Municipality is classified as a 3rd grade municipality with 23 wards. The famous veteran parliamentarian Boddepalli Raja Gopal Rao and MLA Boddepalli Satyavathi is also from this constituency. The Current MLA Is Koona Ravi Kumar.

== Demographics ==
As of 2001 India census, Amadalavalasa had a population of 37,852. Males constitute 51% of the population and females 49%.

== Features ==
There is a large-scale sugar factory in Amadalavalasa, presently not working. Other industries like jute, oil etc. are located at that town. There is head post office at Amadalavalasa.

== Education ==
The primary and secondary school education is imparted by government, aided and private schools, under the School Education Department of the state. The medium of instruction followed by different schools are English, Telugu.
