= Danthavarapukota =

Danthavarapukota Danthapuri
- village
- Interactive map of Danthavarapukota
- Location in Andhra Pradesh, India Danthavarapukota (India)
- Coordinates: 18°28′28″N 83°54′50″E
- Country: India
- State: Andhra Pradesh

Languages
  - Official: Telugu
- Time zone: UTC+5:30 (IST)
- Vehicle Registration: AP30 (Former); AP39 (from 30 January 2019)

Danthapuri Remnants

Danthapuri is one of the historical places near Amadalavalasa. It is a village situated on the way from Amadalavalasa to Hiramandalam in Andhra Pradesh, India. It is 10 km (6.2 mi) from Amadalavalasa and 22 km (14 mi) away from Srikakulam Town.

== Buddhist Monuments ==
Ancient Buddha stupas are present in this place. It is believed to be a place of Buddhism and a shiddhardas living place. It is an important archeological place, called Boudha Gynana dantha puri, where the archeological department found some bricks, pots, nabbed wear, terracotta articles, bangles, beads, stone and iron articles. It is elevated in the BC 261 after Kalinga battle by Ashoka Chakravarthi. Kalinga kings made Danthapuri as capital of their region. The Boudha Gynana dantha collected and presented by Arhat Kheru Terudu to Brahmadatta Raja of Kalinga. Brahma Datta Kalinga Raja constructed a monument on Boudha Gyana Dahtha in this place so the place is called Danthapuri.

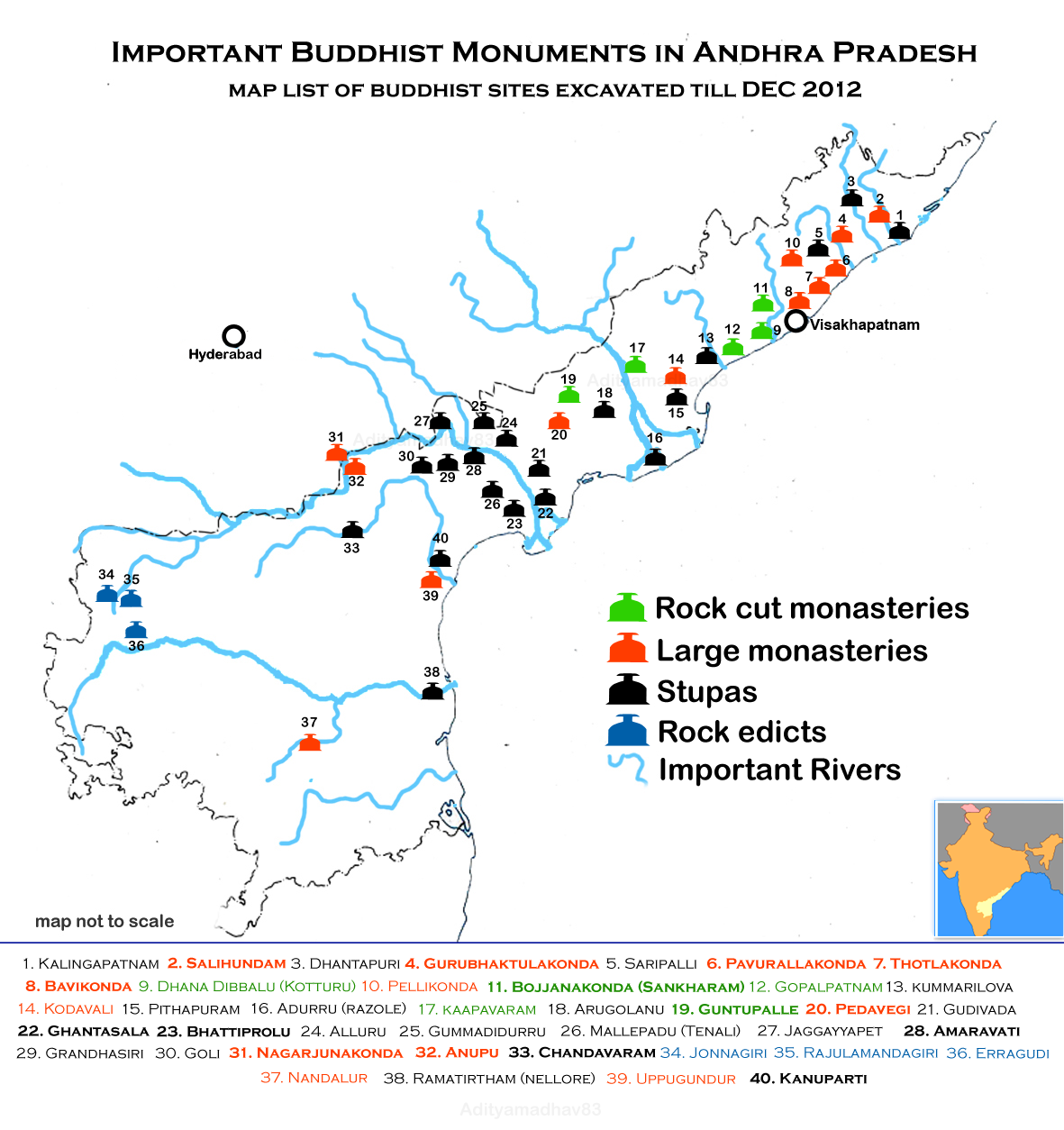
Danthapuri is one of the important Buddhist sites of Andhra Pradesh
