= Kambojika Putta Khemara Tarei =

Cambodian dragon boat

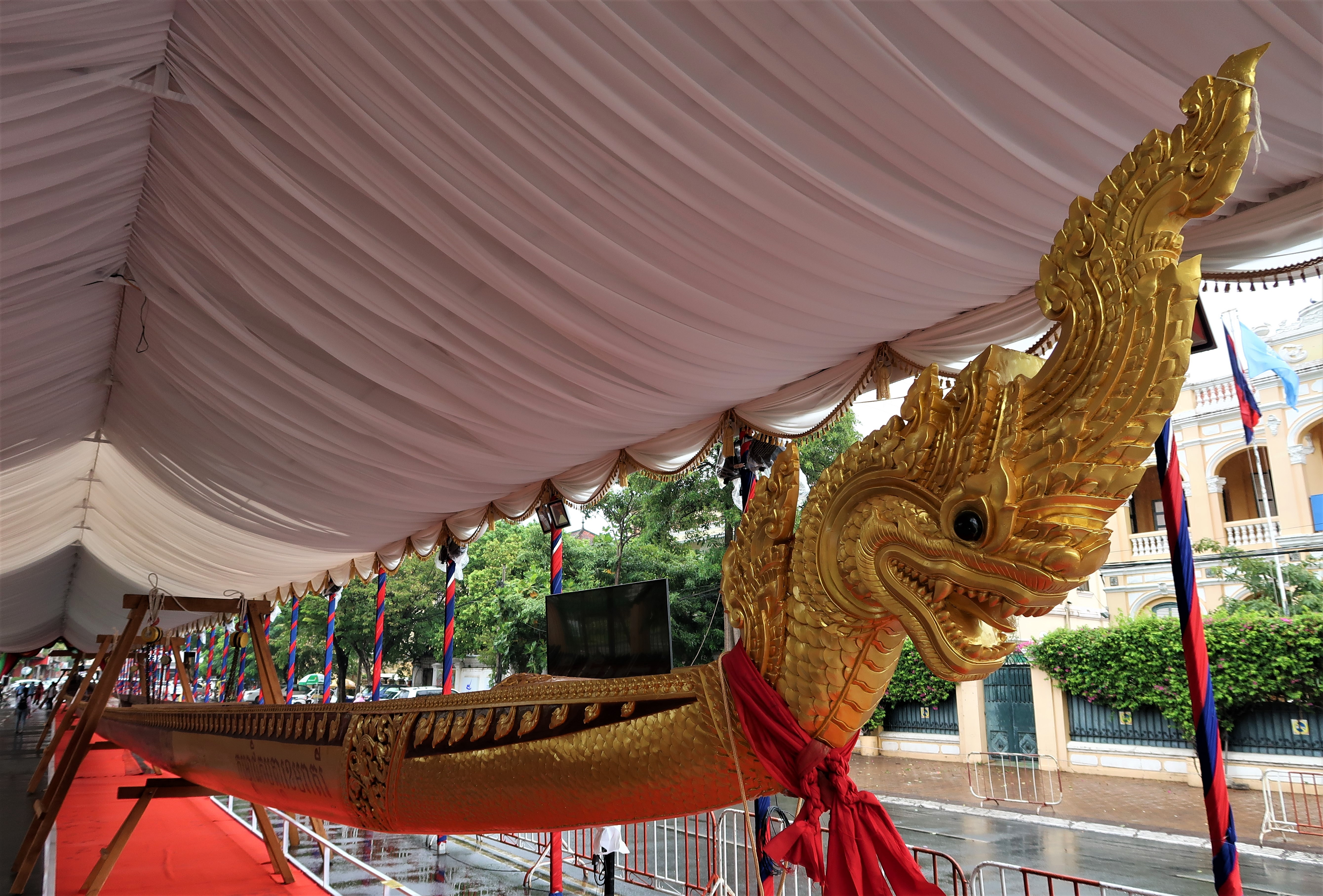
On display next to Royal Palace in Phnom Penh.

Kambojika Putta Khemara Tarei (Khmer: កម្ពោជិកបុត្តាខេមរាតរី) is a dragon boat from Cambodia. The boat holds the Guinness record of being the longest dragon boat in the world. With an overall length of 87.3 metres (286 ft), in November 2018, the boat beat the previous record of 77.8 metres (255 ft) set by a Chinese dragon boat in May 2016. The boat was showcased during the 2018 Water Festival in Phnom Penh.

== History ==
The boat was built to remember the history of production and use of dragon boats by the Khmer people and Khmer kings in older times, who used dragon boats as means of transport to defend the territory. The boat was built by Union of Youth Federations of Cambodia at an overall cost of US$60,000 (equivalent to $76,928 in 2025). Construction of the boat began in April 2018 and it took nearly seven months to finish the construction. The boat measures 87.3 metres (286 ft) in overall length, 1.99 metres (6.5 ft) in width and it can accommodate 179 oarsman. More than 13,000 people participated in the construction of the boat and it was completely hand-made.

The name Kambojika Putta Khemara Tarei translates to “Dragon Boat of Khmer Youth in Cambodian Territory".

The 179 oarsman in the boat symbolizes the day Cambodia was liberated from Khmer Rouge (7 January 1979); 1 being the month and 79 the year.

== Images ==
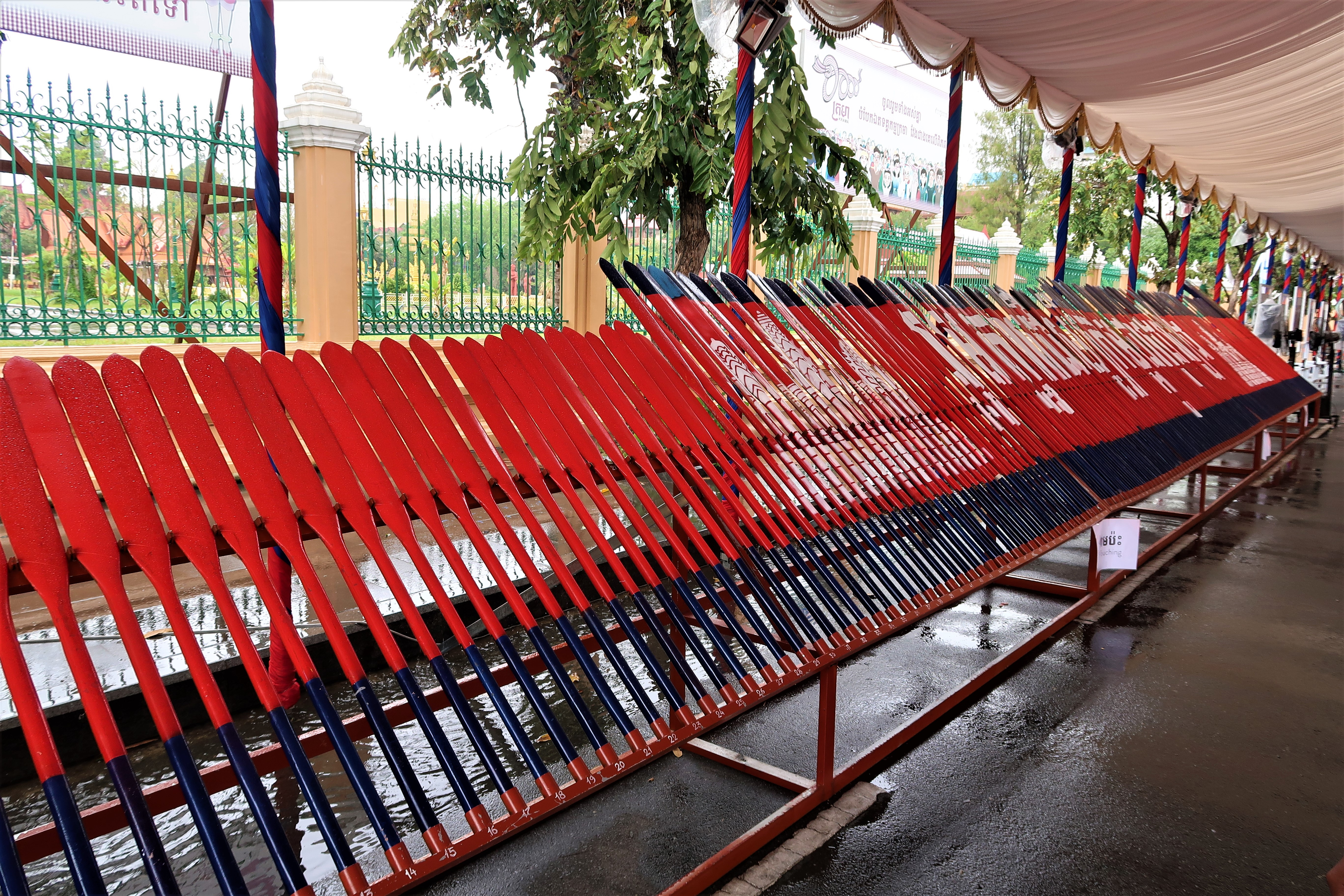
179 Oars of the boat.

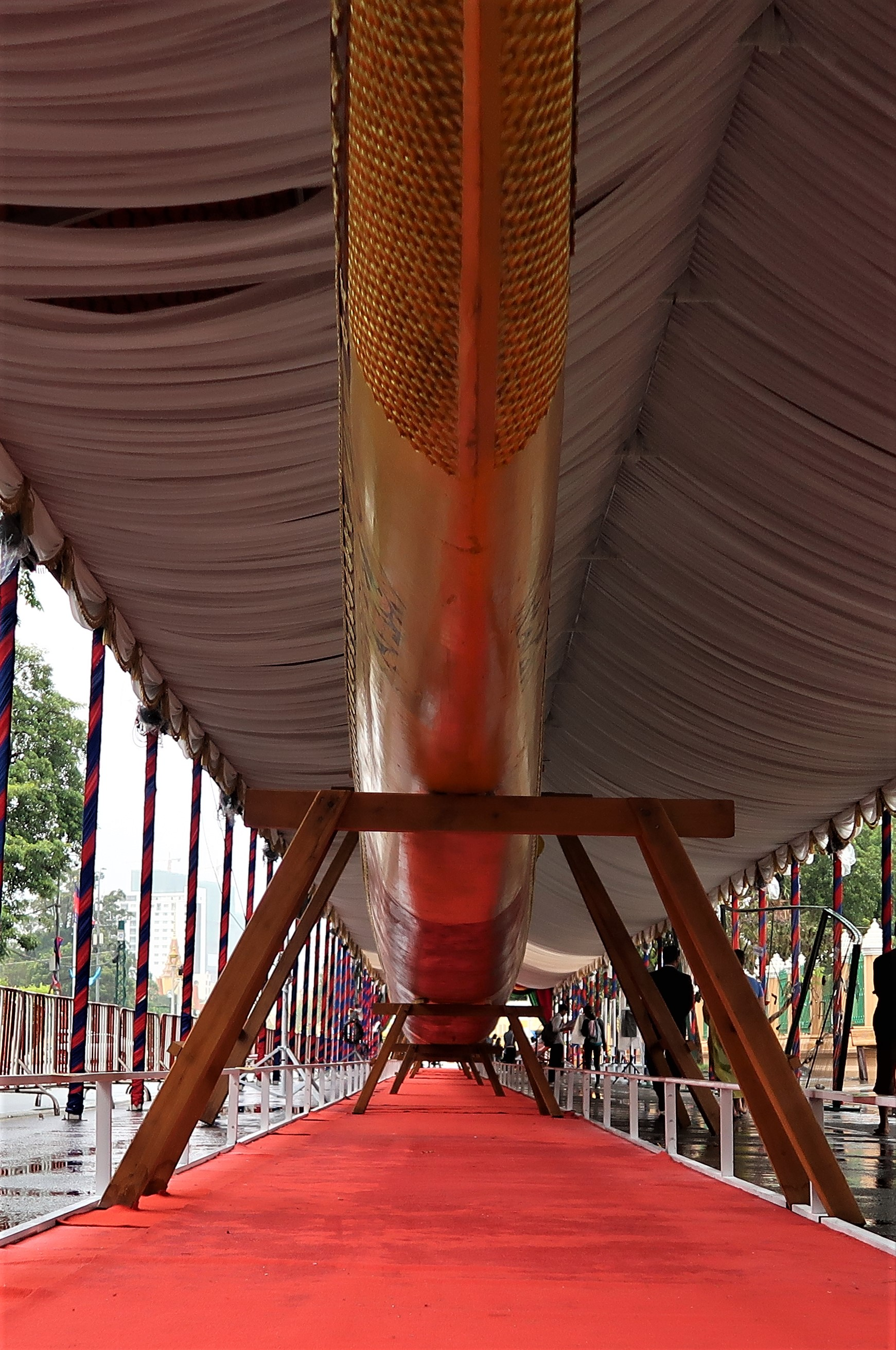
Underbelly.

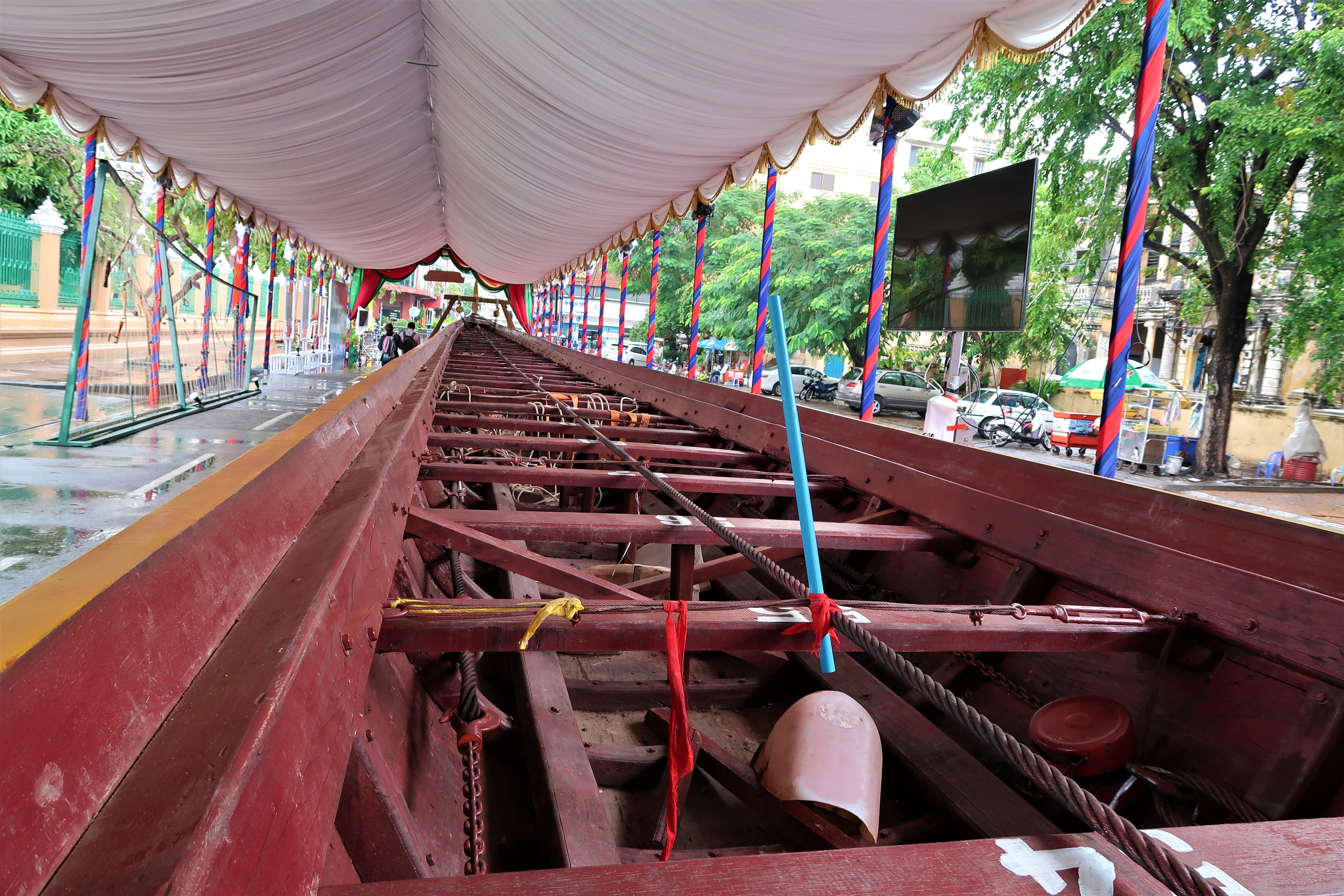

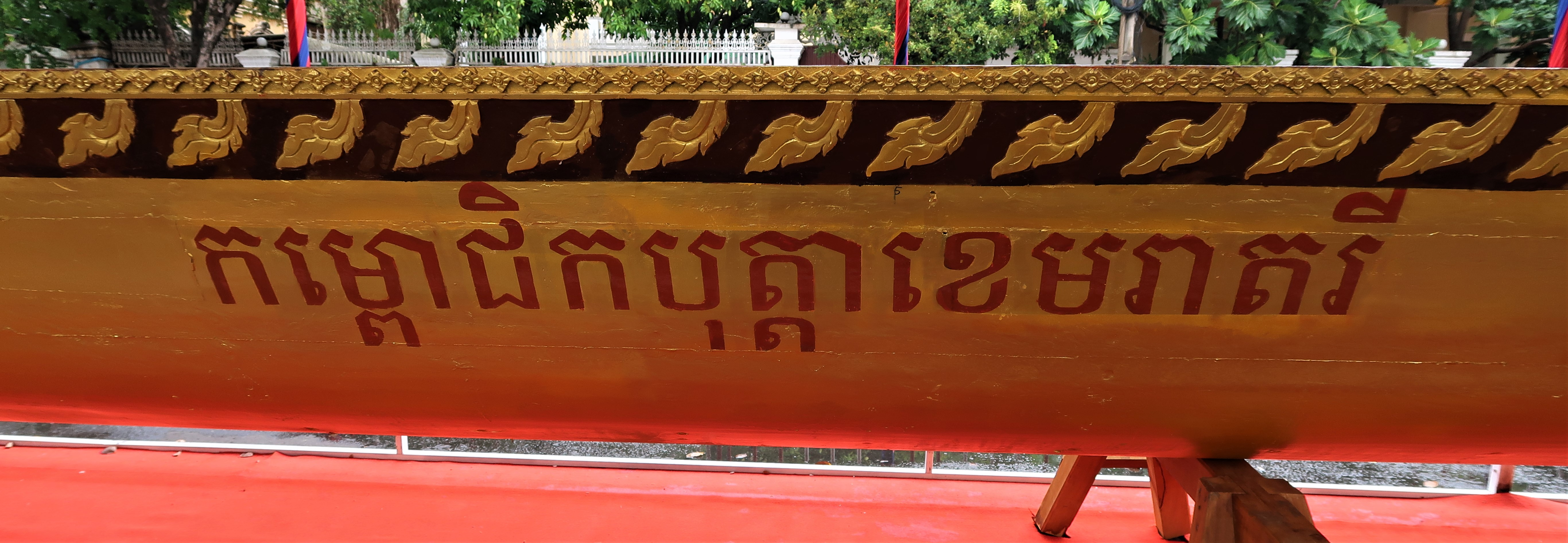
Boat name written in Khmer language.

Records
Preceded by Unnamed Chinese dragon boat	World's longest Dragon boat 2018–present	Succeeded by None
