= Canadian Dragonboat Championships =

Annual three day competition

The Canadian National Dragonboat Championships is an annual three day competition organized by Dragonboat Canada and held in Ontario, Canada. Dragonboat teams from all over Canada, including Vancouver, Montreal, Ottawa, Toronto, and Halifax, attend this event. There are event categories for University crews (U24), Premiere and Seniors (40+). Races distances include 200m, 500m and 2000m.

Winners in this event qualify to compete in the Club Crew World Championships, an international event featuring the best club crews from around the world, and many go on to compete in the World Dragonboat Championships.

The event depends on the work of many volunteers. In 2014 there were 104 individual races.

In 2015 147 teams competed in the championships, which were held at the Welland International Flatwater Centre. That year Dragonboat Canada signed an agreement to continue the use of the Flatwater Centre for the race for five years.

The 2016 event had eight age classes, each with mixed, open, men's and women's events.
