= Kasibugga =

- Neighbourhood
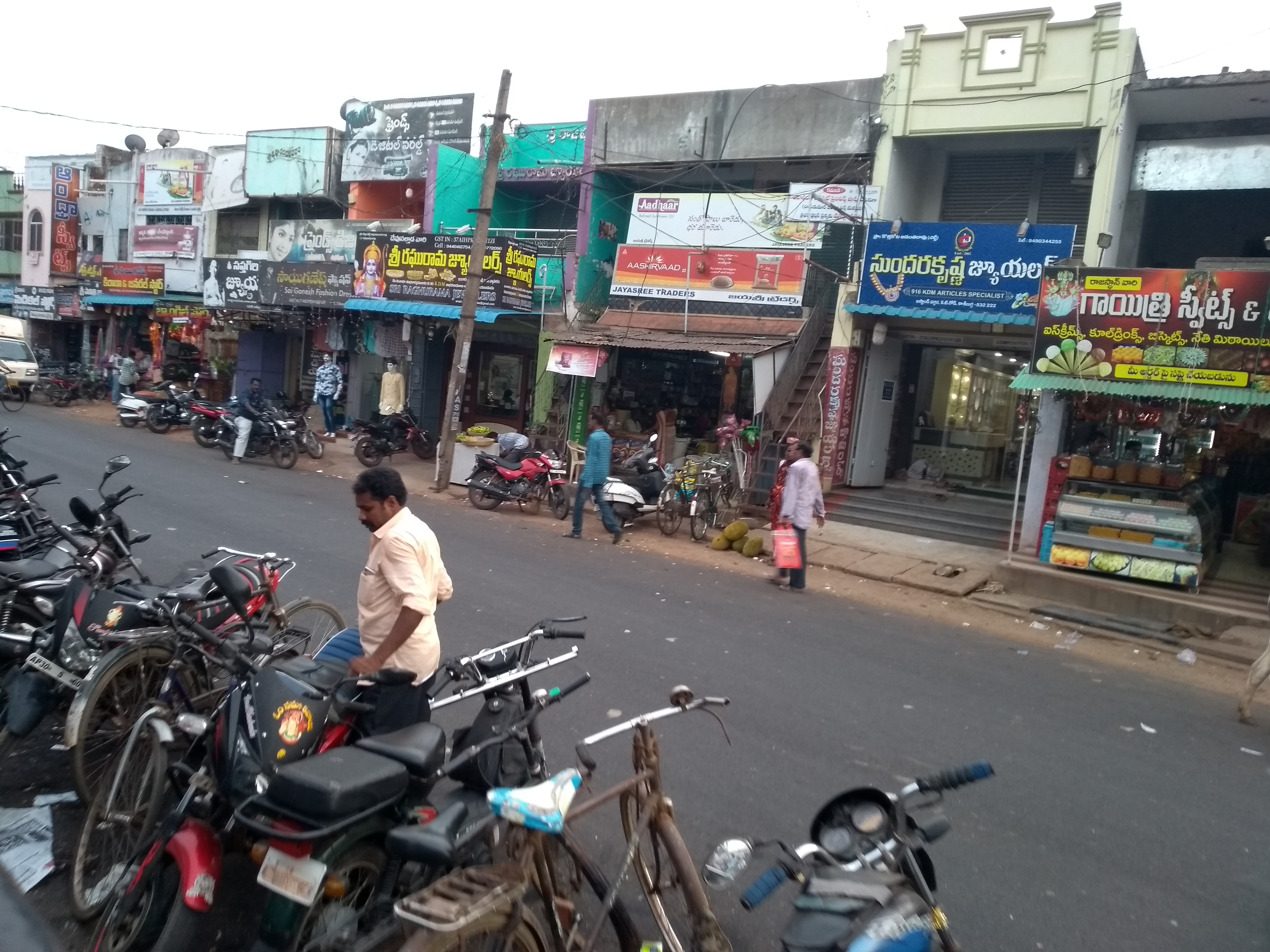
- KT Road

- Location in Andhra Pradesh, India
- Coordinates: 18.764006°N 84.424130°E
- Country: India
- State: Andhra Pradesh
- District: Srikakulam
- Town: Palasa, Srikakulam district

Government
  - Type: Municipality
  - Body: Palasa-Kasibugga Municipality, SUDA

Languages
  - Official: Telugu
- Time zone: UTC+5:30 (IST)
- PIN: 532222
- Telephone code: 08945
- Vehicle registration: AP-30 (former); AP–39 (from 30 January 2019)
- Website: Palasa–Kasibugga Municipality

Kasibugga is a neighbourhood of Palasa town in Srikakulam district of the Indian state of Andhra Pradesh.

== Geography ==
Kasibugga is located at 18°45'33"N 84°24'58"E. It has an average elevation of 38 meters (127 feet).

== Administration ==
Kasibugga comes under Palasa (Assembly constituency) and the urban local body is Palasa-Kasibugga Municipality.

== Transport ==
Kasibugga is well connected with major cities in the state of Andhra Pradesh, such as Visakhapatnam, other cities and towns in Telangana and Odisha. National Highway 16(formerly NH5) bypasses through the town.

The nearest railway station is the Palasa railway station which is also connected to the town.
