= Baruva Beach =

Beach in Andhra Pradesh, India

- Beach
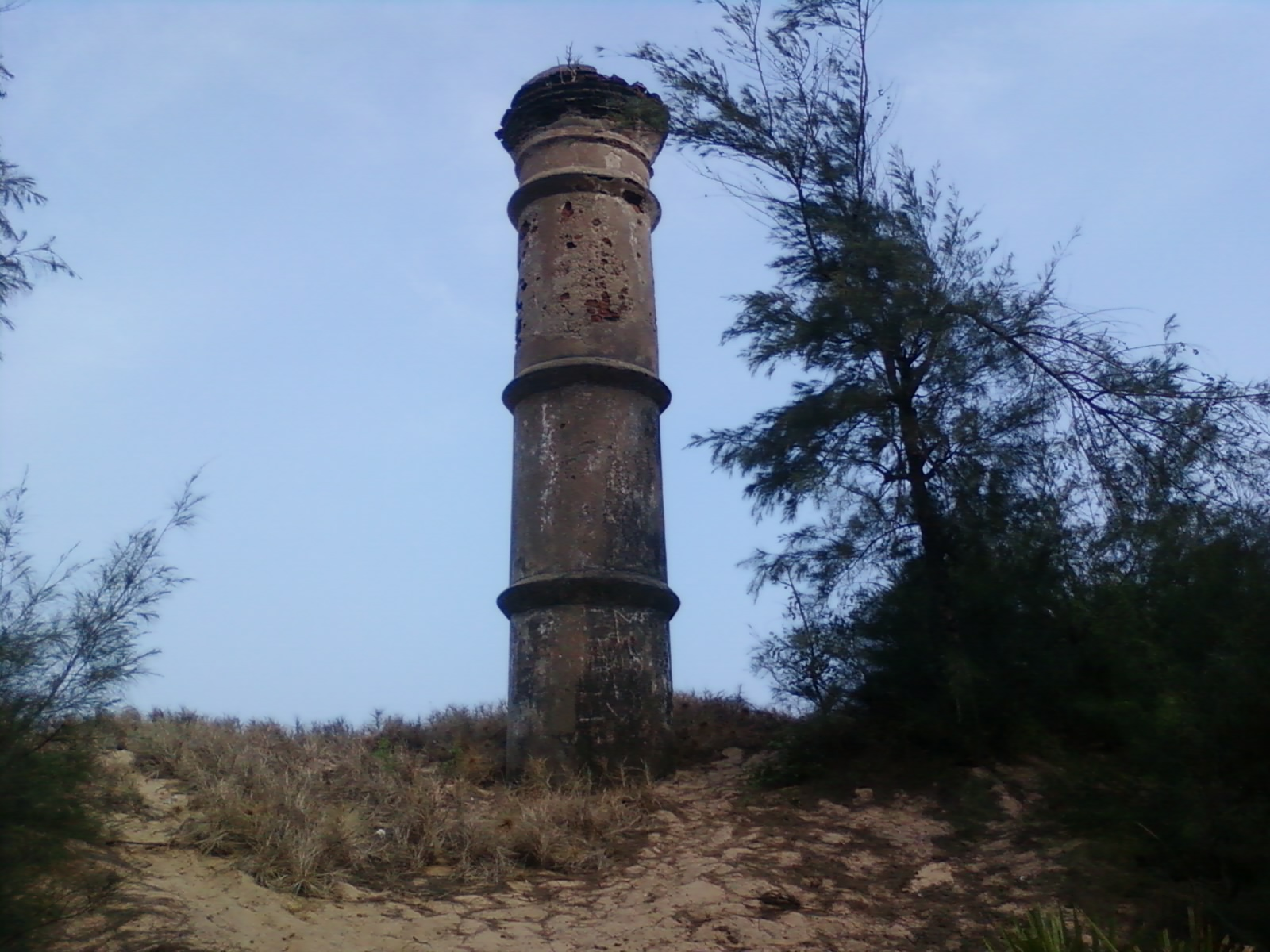
- Commemorative pillar

- Coordinates: 18.881531°N 84.596289°E
- Location: Baruva, Srikakulam district, Andhra Pradesh, India

Baruva Beach is situated on the east coast of Bay of Bengal in Baruva, a village at a distance of 27 kilometres (17 mi) from Palasa.

== History ==
Baruva Beach is one of the oldest beaches in Andhra Pradesh. It was used as seaport until 1948. On the beach is a commemorative pillar placed in remembrance of a cargo ship that sank nearby in 1917. It is also called as the second Goa of India.

== See also ==
- List of beaches in India
