= Summadevi =

- village
- Interactive map of Summadevi
- Location in Andhra Pradesh, India
- Country: India
- State: Andhra Pradesh

Languages
  - Official: Telugu
- Time zone: UTC+5:30 (IST)

Summadevi is a village located near Palasa in Srikakulam district, Andhra Pradesh, India. It is located on north east direction from Palasa town near National Highway-5 and Howrah-Chennai main railway line. Summadevi is having Summadevi railway station. Trains that run from Palasa towards Khruda Road, halt at Summadevi station.
