= Pundi, Srikakulam district =

Pundi
- Village
- Interactive map of Pundi
- Location in Andhra Pradesh, India Pundi (India)
- Coordinates: 18.665752°N 84.371030°E
- Country: India
- State: Andhra Pradesh
- District: Srikakulam

Government
  - Type: Gram Panchayat

Languages
  - Official: Telugu
- Time zone: UTC+5:30 (IST)
- PIN: 532218
- Vehicle registration: AP-30

Pundi is a Major village in Srikakulam district of the Indian state of Andhra Pradesh. It is located in Vajrapukotturu mandal .

== Transportation ==
Pundi railway station is 12 km distance from Palasa railway station.
