= Budarasingi =

- Village
- Interactive map of Budarasingi
- Location in Andhra Pradesh, India Budarasingi (India)
- Coordinates: 18.9333°N 84.4500°E
- Country: India
- State: Andhra Pradesh
- District: Srikakulam
- Talukas: Mandasa

Population
  - Total: 2,418

Languages
  - Official: Telugu
- Time zone: UTC+5:30 (IST)
- Lok Sabha constituency: Srikakulam

Budarasingi is a village in Mandasa mandal of Srikakulam district, Andhra Pradesh, India.

== Geography ==
Budarasingi is located at 18.9333°N 84.4500°E. It has an average elevation of 50 meters (167 feet).

== Demographics ==
As of 2001 Indian census, the demographic details of Budarasingi village is as follows:

- Total Population: 2,418 in 564 Households
- Male Population: 1,202 and Female Population: 1,216
- Children Under 6-years of age: 360 (Boys - 172 and Girls - 188)
- Total Literates: 1,042
