= Mandasa Road railway station =

Railway station in Andhra Pradesh

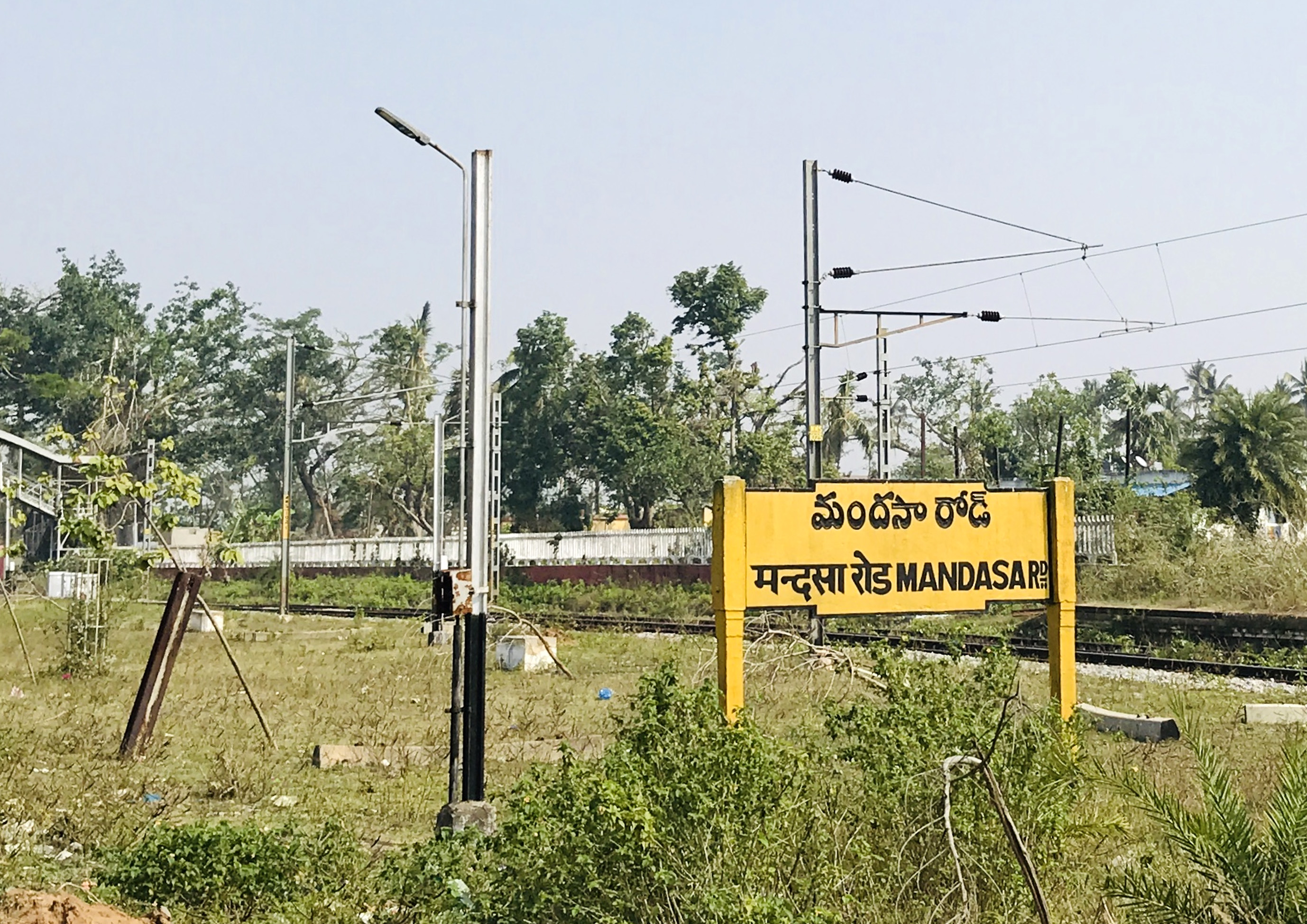
- Mandasa road railway station name board

General information
- Location: Suvarnapuram, Mandasa Road, Srikakulam district, Andhra Pradesh; India
- Coordinates: 18.840628°N 84.494113°E
- Elevation: 35 m (115 ft)
- System: Passenger train station
- Owner: Indian Railways
- Operator: South Coast Railway
- Line: Howrah–Chennai main line
- Platforms: 4
- Tracks: 4

Construction
- Structure type: Standard (on-ground station)

Other information
- Status: Functioning
- Station code: MMS
- Zone(s): South Coast Railway zone
- Division(s): Visakhapatnam

History
- Opened: 1899
- Former names: East Coast State Railway

Services
Preceding station	Indian Railways	Following station
Baruva towards Howrah Junction	South Coast Railway zone Howrah–Chennai main line	Summadevi towards Chennai Central
Location
- Location within India Location within Andhra Pradesh

Mandasa Road railway station is a railway station on Khurda Road–Visakhapatnam section, part of the Howrah–Chennai main line under Visakhapatnam railway division of South Coast Railway zone. It is situated at Suvarnapuram, Mandasa Road in Srikakulam district in the Indian state of Andhra Pradesh.

== History ==
In between 1893 and 1896, the coastal railway track from Cuttack to Vijayawada was built and opened to traffic by East Coast State Railway. The route was electrified in several phases. Khurda–Visakhapatnam section was completely electrified by 2002 and Howrah–Chennai route was fully electrified in 2005.
