= Baruva =

- village
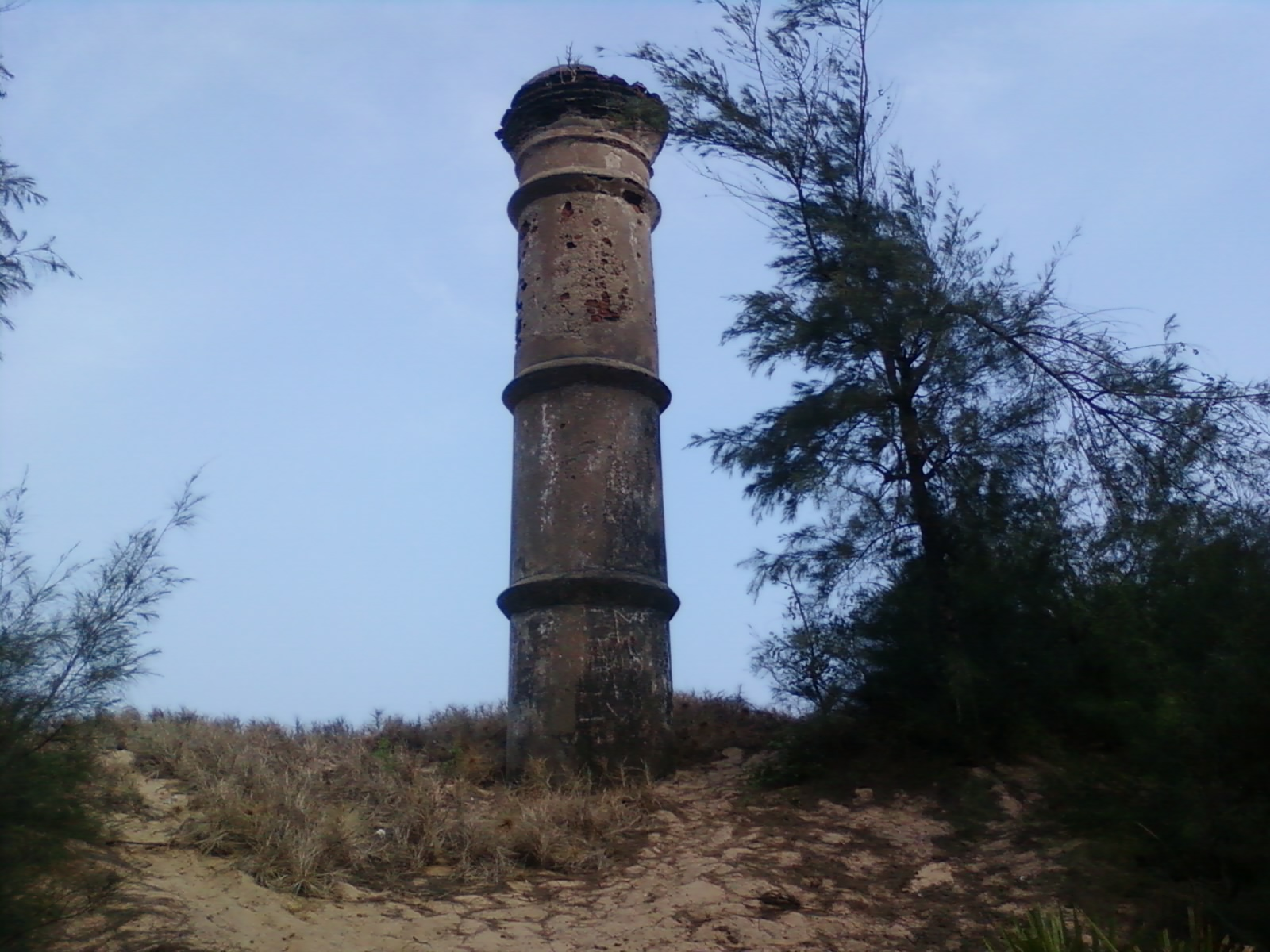
- Pillar at Baruva, constructed to commemorate a 1917 shipping accident
- Interactive map of Baruva
- Location in Andhra Pradesh, India Baruva (India)
- Coordinates: 18.882953°N 84.582419°E
- Country: India
- State: Andhra Pradesh
- District: Srikakulam
- Elevation: 10 m (33 ft)

Population
  - Total: 5,795

Languages
  - Official: Telugu
- Time zone: UTC+5:30 (IST)
- PIN: 532263
- Vehicle Registration: AP30 (Former); AP39 (from 30 January 2019)

Baruva is a village and a beach resort located near Sompeta in Srikakulam district, Andhra Pradesh, India. It is located at 18.53N 84.35E., at an average elevation of 10 m (33 ft). The Mahendratanaya River merges into the Bay of Bengal at this place. This village is situated at a distance of 109 km from Srikakulam town, the district headquarters.

Baruva was used as a seaport in the era of British colonial rule in India up to 1948. In July, 1917, a ship carrying goods sank in the sea. To commemorate this incident a pillar was constructed. The harbor is closed, but the old lighthouse stood until 2000.

== Tourism ==
- The swampy sea shore, locally called "beela", is well known for duck shooting and fishing.
- The famous Sri Kotilingeswara Swamy and Janardhana Swamy temples are here.
- The river Mahendra Tanya merges into sea at this place. Thousands of people take sea bath during festival days, especially in "Karthikam" (November–December) every year.
- Baruva was once a seaport. Two obelisks, one white and the other black, of fifty feet height above the sea level, mark the seaport.
- The large grooves of coconut trees and green paddy fields make the place picturesque.

== Transport ==
Baruva railway station is located on Howrah-Chennai mainline. Passenger trains that run from Palasa towards Khurda Road station halt at Baruva station.
