= Srikakulam Urban Development Authority =

Indian government agency

Srikakulam Urban Development Authority (SUDA)
- శ్రీకాకుళం నగర అభివృద్ధి సంస్థ

Agency overview
- Formed: 12 February 2019
- Type: Urban Planning Agency
- Jurisdiction: Government of Andhra Pradesh
- Headquarters: Srikakulam, Andhra Pradesh

The Srikakulam Urban Development Authority is an urban planning agency in Srikakulam district and Vizianagaram districts of the Indian state of Andhra Pradesh. It was constituted on 12 February 2019, under Andhra Pradesh Metropolitan Region and Urban Development Authorities Act, 2016 with the headquarters located at Srikakulam.

== Jurisdiction ==
The jurisdictional area of SUDA is spread over an area of 3,824.63 km^{2} (1,476.70 sq mi). It covers 1264 villages in 28 mandals of Srikakulam district. The below table lists the urban areas of SUDA.

Jurisdiction
Settlement Type	Name	Total
Municipal Corporations	Srikakulam	1
Municipalities	Amudalavalasa, Ichchapuram, Palasa-Kasibugga	3
Nagara Panchayats	Rajam	1
