= Mandasa =

Mandasa Manjusha
- Village
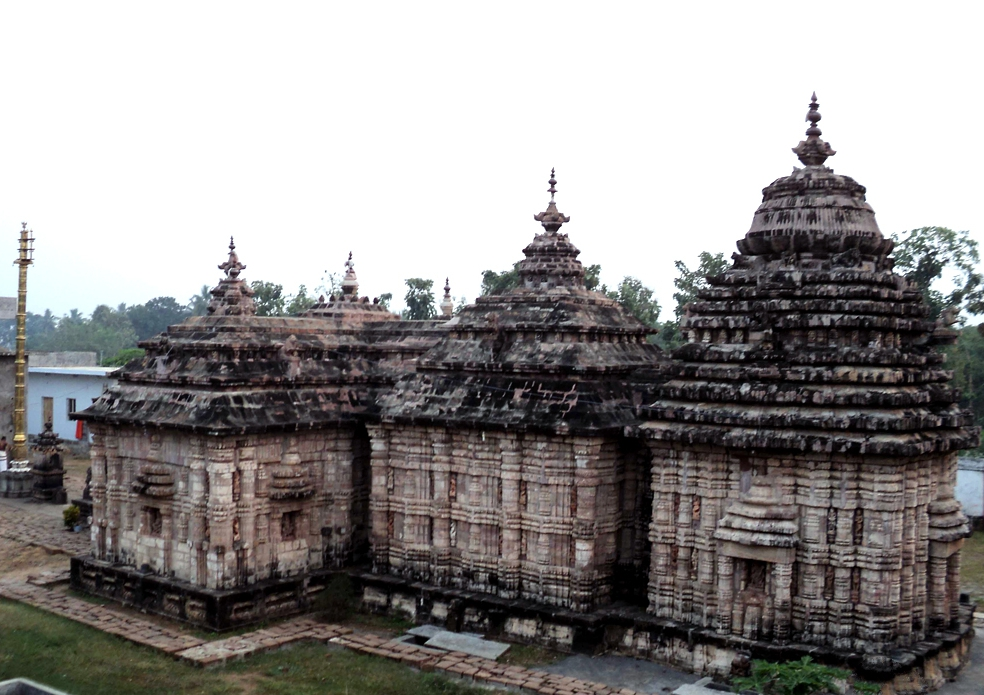
- Mandasa Vasudeva Temple
- Interactive map of Mandasa
- Location in Andhra Pradesh, India Mandasa (India)
- Coordinates: 18.8667°N 84.4667°E
- Country: India
- State: Andhra Pradesh
- District: Srikakulam
- Talukas: Mandasa

Languages
  - Official: Telugu
  - Other most spoken local languages: Odia Language
- Time zone: UTC+5:30 (IST)
- PIN: 532242
- Vehicle registration: AP
- Lok Sabha constituency: Srikakulam
- Vidhan Sabha constituency: Palasa

Mandasa is a village in Srikakulam district of the Indian state of Andhra Pradesh. Mandasa is also known by the name Manjusha in Odia. It was ruled by erstwhile odia zamindar Rajamani royal family during British Raj. Srinivasa Rajamani was the famous Ruling chief Rajah of this estate.

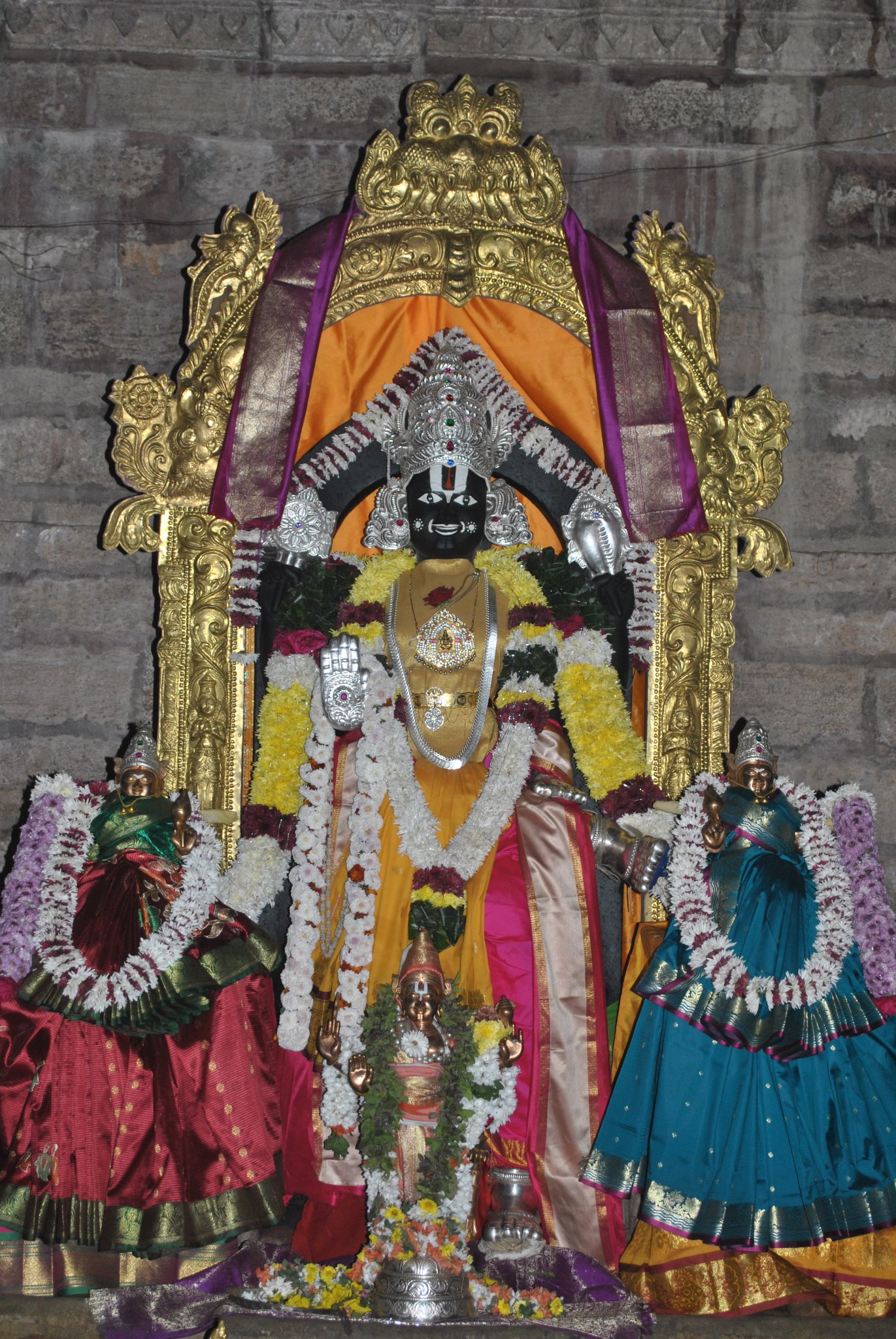
Lord Vasudeva

This village is located at a distance of 98 km from the district headquarters.

At Gopal Sagar tank bund in Mandasa, an ancient stone mandapa exists which is built only with stones, indicating its antiquity. Opposite to this mandapa, on a wall, an ancient Jain idol of Parshvanatha in meditative posture with seven-hooded serpent is located. Archaeology officials have inspected the site. When the mandapa was demolished Mamidi Kodandarao, Nalli dharmarao submitted a petition to the Collector to save the Jain idol, restore the demolished mandapa and punish the culprits. Gopal Sagar lake is visible in the background, confirming the location is at Gopal Sagar,

Ancient stone mandapa built only with stones at Gopal Sagar, Mandasa

Archaeology officials inspecting Jain idol of Parshvanatha near Gopal Sagar bund, Mandasa

Mamidi Kodandarao, submitting petition to Collector to save Jain idol and restore demolished mandapa at Gopal Sagar, Mandasa

== Geography ==
Mandasa has an average elevation of 31 metres (102 ft).

Mandasa mandal is bordered by Sompeta mandal to the northeast, Palasa mandal to the southwest, Vajrapu Kotturu mandal to the south, Patrapur block of Ganjam district, Odisha to the north, Rayagada block of Gajapati district, Odisha to the west and Bay of Bengal to the east.

== Places of importance ==
- Mahendragiri is close to the village. A fort is located at the foot of the mountain.
- The temple of Vasudeva Perumal which is located in the village attracts pilgrims and tourists.
- Govardhanagiri hill in Mandasa mandal is known for ancient Jain idols and structures, which are being preserved by local heritage activists.

== Demographics ==
According to Indian census, 2001, the demographic details of Mandasa mandal is as follows:

- Total Population: 76,402 in 17,814 Households
- Male Population: 37,368 and Female Population: 39,034
- Children Under 6-years of age: 10,823 (Boys - 5,456 and Girls - 5,367)
- Total Literates: 38,425

== Transport ==
Mandasa is connected with 'Mandasa Road' railway station on Howrah-Chennai mainline in East Coast Railway, Indian Railways.

== Gopal Sagar Jain Heritage ==
At Gopal Sagar tank bund in Mandasa, an ancient stone mandapa exists which is built only with stones, indicating its antiquity. Opposite to this mandapa, on a wall, an ancient Jain idol of Parshvanatha in meditative posture with seven-hooded serpent is located. Archaeology officials have inspected the site. When the mandapa was demolished, Mamidi Kodandarao submitted a petition to the Collector to save the Jain idol, restore the demolished mandapa and punish the culprits. Gopal Sagar lake is visible in the background, confirming the location is at Gopal Sagar, not Govardhana hill.

Ancient stone mandapa built only with stones at Gopal Sagar, Mandasa

Archaeology officials inspecting Jain idol of Parshvanatha near Gopal Sagar bund, Mandasa

Mamidi Kodandarao submitting petition to Collector to save Jain idol and restore demolished mandapa at Gopal Sagar, Mandasa
