= Palasa railway station =

Railway station in Andhra Pradesh, India

Palasa
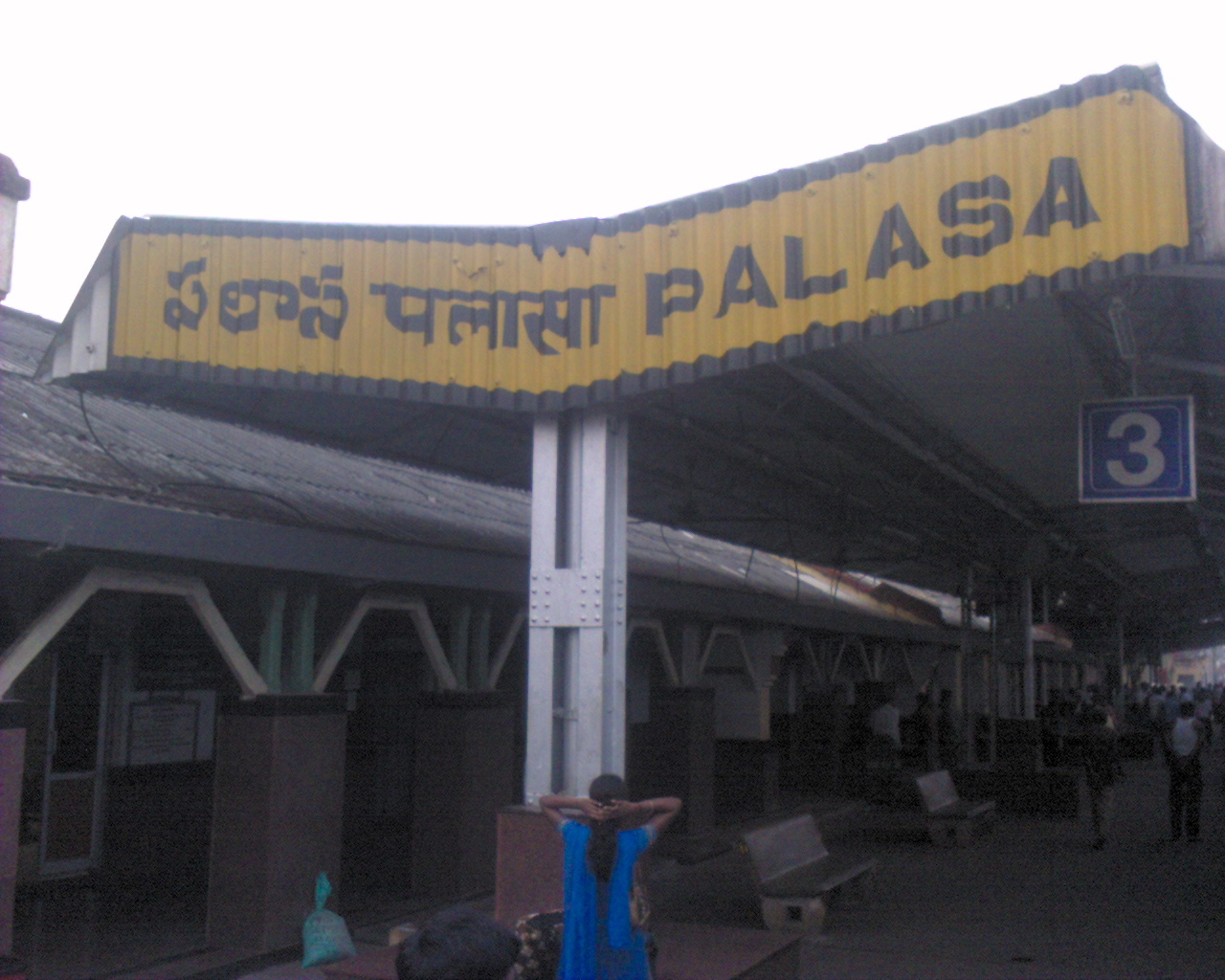
- Palasa railway station

General information
- Location: Palasa Station Road, Kasibugga, Andhra Pradesh; India
- Coordinates: 18°45′25″N 84°25′20″E
- Elevation: 31 m (102 ft)
- System: Indian Railways station
- Owner: Indian Railways
- Operator: South Coast Railway
- Line: Howrah-Chennai main line
- Platforms: 4
- Tracks: 8

Construction
- Structure type: Standard on ground
- Parking: Yes
- Cycle facilities: yes

Other information
- Status: Functioning
- Station code: PSA
- Division(s): Visakhapatnam

History
- Opened: 1893–1896
- Electrified: 1998–2000

Services
Preceding station	Indian Railways	Following station
Summadevi towards Howrah Junction	South Coast Railway zone Khurda Road–Visakhapatnam section of Howrah–Chennai main line	Pundi towards Chennai Central
Location
- Location within Andhra Pradesh Location within India

Palasa railway station (station code: PSA) is located in the Indian state of Andhra Pradesh, serves Palasa and surrounding areas in Srikakulam district.

== History ==
During the period 1893 to 1896, 1,287 km (800 mi) of railway tracks covering the entire coastal stretch from Cuttack to Vijayawada, was built and opened to traffic by East Coast State Railway.

=== Reorganization ===
The Bengal Nagpur Railway was nationalized in 1944. Eastern Railway was formed on 14 April 1952 with the portion of East Indian Railway Company east of Mughalsarai and the Bengal Nagpur Railway. In 1955, South Eastern Railway was carved out of Eastern Railway. It comprised lines mostly operated by BNR earlier. Amongst the new zones started in April 2003 were East Coast Railway and South East Central Railway. Both these railways were carved out of South Eastern Railway.

== Electrification ==
The Palasa–Tilaru sector was electrified in 1998–99.

== Amenities ==
Palasa railway station has a double-bedded non-AC retiring room. Other amenities at the railway station include computerized reservation offices, telephone booth, cloak room, waiting room, vegetarian and non-vegetarian refreshment rooms and book stall.

== Classification ==
Palasa railway station is classified as an A–category station in the Visakhapatnam railway division.

== Performance ==
Palasa railway station serves about 75,000 passengers every day.

== Railway reorganization ==
The Bengal Nagpur Railway was nationalized in 1944. Eastern Railway was formed on 14 April 1952 with the portion of East Indian Railway Company east of Mughalsarai and the Bengal Nagpur Railway. In 1955, South Eastern Railway was carved out of Eastern Railway. It comprised lines mostly operated by BNR earlier. Amongst the new zones started in April 2003 were East Coast Railway and South East Central Railway. Both these railways were carved out of South Eastern Railway.
