= Pundi railway station =

Railway station in Andhrapradesh

Pundi

General information
- Location: Pundi, Srikakulam distt, Andhra Pradesh; India
- Coordinates: 18°39′54″N 84°22′14″E
- Elevation: 48 m (157 ft)
- System: Indian Railways station
- Lines: Khurda Road–Visakhapatnam section of Howrah–Chennai main line Khurda Road–Visakhapatnam section
- Platforms: 3
- Tracks: 5 ft 6 in (1,676 mm) broad gauge

Construction
- Structure type: Standard on-ground station
- Parking: Available

Other information
- Status: Active
- Station code: PUN
- Zone(s): SCoR
Location

Pundi railway station (station code:PUN) is located in the Indian state of Andhra Pradesh. It serves Pundi, Vajrapukotturu and surrounding areas in Srikakulam district.

It is a major hub for regions around Vajrapukotturu. It is situated in Pundi, a village in Srikakulam district in Andhra Pradesh.

== Amenities ==
This station has a First Class Waiting Hall, computerised reservation offices, II class waiting room, footbridge, and a Public Address System. A computerized reservation counter is available from 08:00 hrs to 20:00 hrs.

This station has 3 platforms.
