= Palasa–Kasibugga Municipality =

Indian local self government

Agency overview
- Formed: 2000
- Type: Urban Planning Agency
- Jurisdiction: Government of Andhra Pradesh
- Headquarters: Palasa, Srikakulam district, Andhra Pradesh, India; 18.773398°N 84.409249°E
- Parent agency: Municipal Administration and Urban Development Department
- Website: Palasa Municipality Official Website

Palasa–Kasibugga Municipality is the local self government in Palasa of the Indian state of Andhra Pradesh. It is classified as a 2nd Grade Municipality. It constitutes total population of 57,507.

== Area ==
The municipality has an area of 32.75 Sq. Km. It is the largest Municipality in terms of area in the district.

== Administration ==
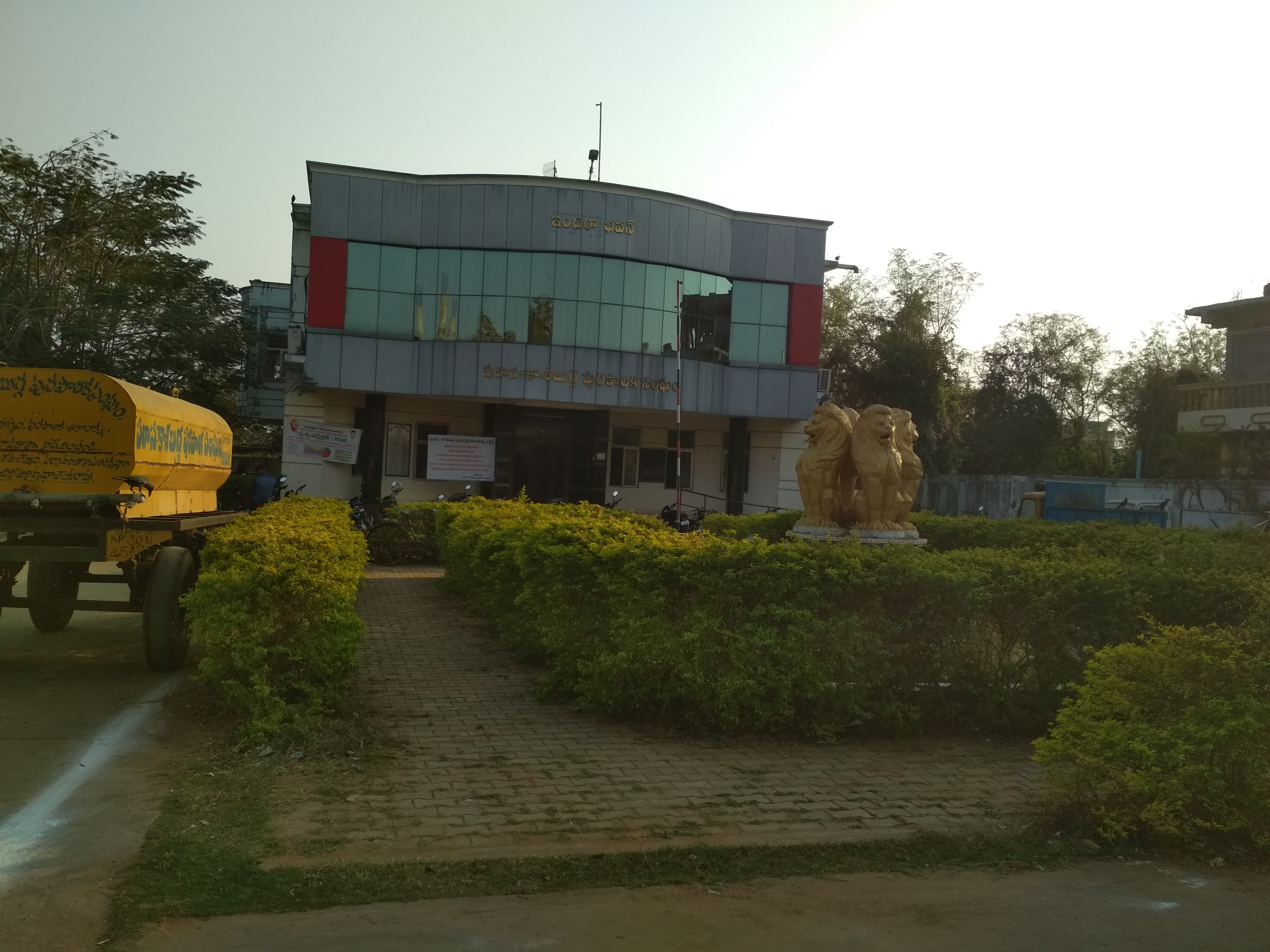
Municipal office

Palasa-Kasibugga municipality was formed in the year 2000. The municipality is spread over an area of 37.75 and has 31 election wards, each represented by a ward member and the wards committee is headed by a chairperson.

== Municipal Chairman ==
- Vajja Baburao (2002-2007)
- Kotni Lakshmi (2007-2012)
- Kotha Purna Chandra Rao (2014–19)
- Balla Giribabu (2021-2026 )
- Vajja Ganagabhavani (2026- Present)

== See also ==
- List of municipalities in Andhra Pradesh
