= Palasa =

- Town
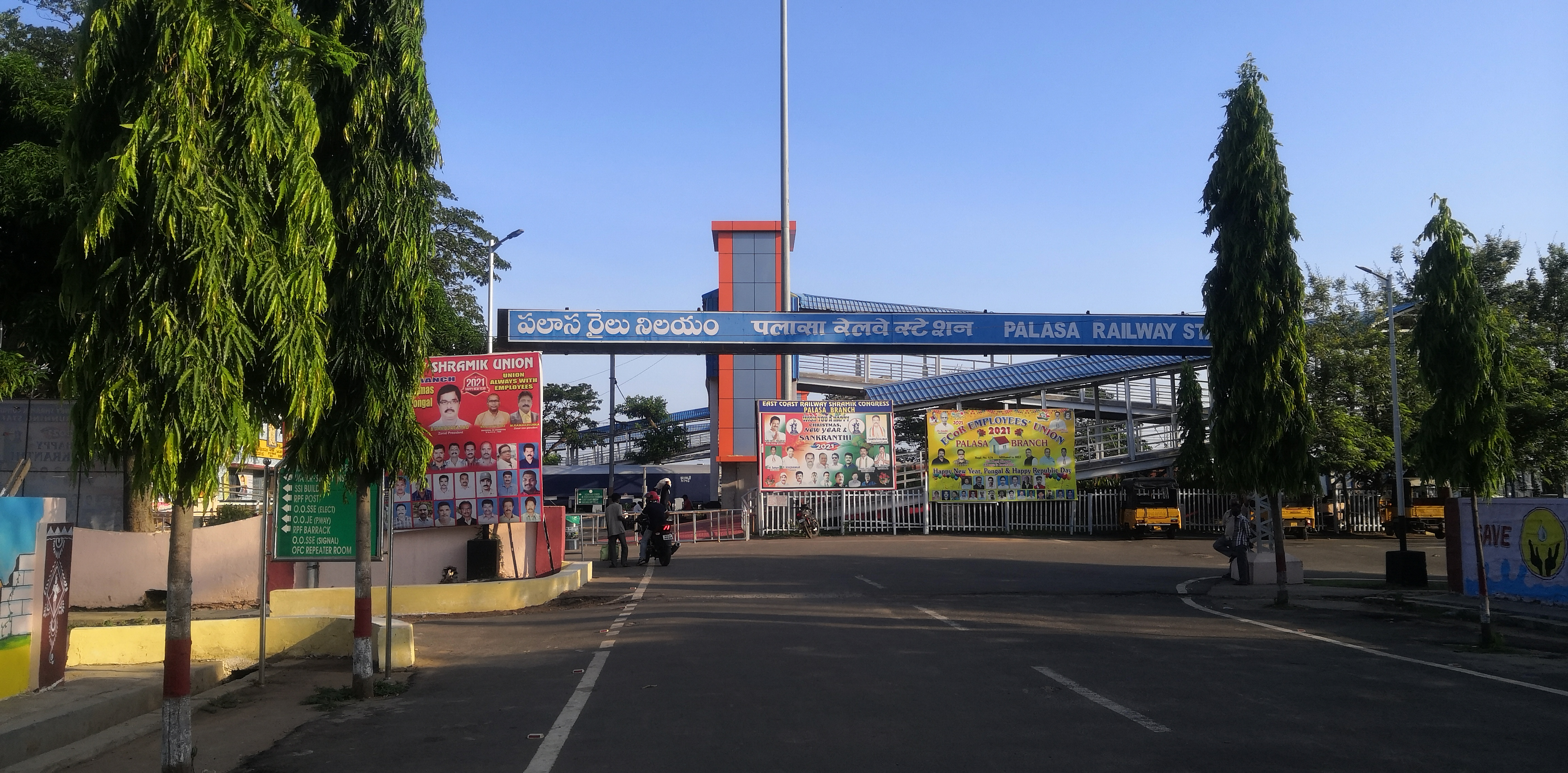
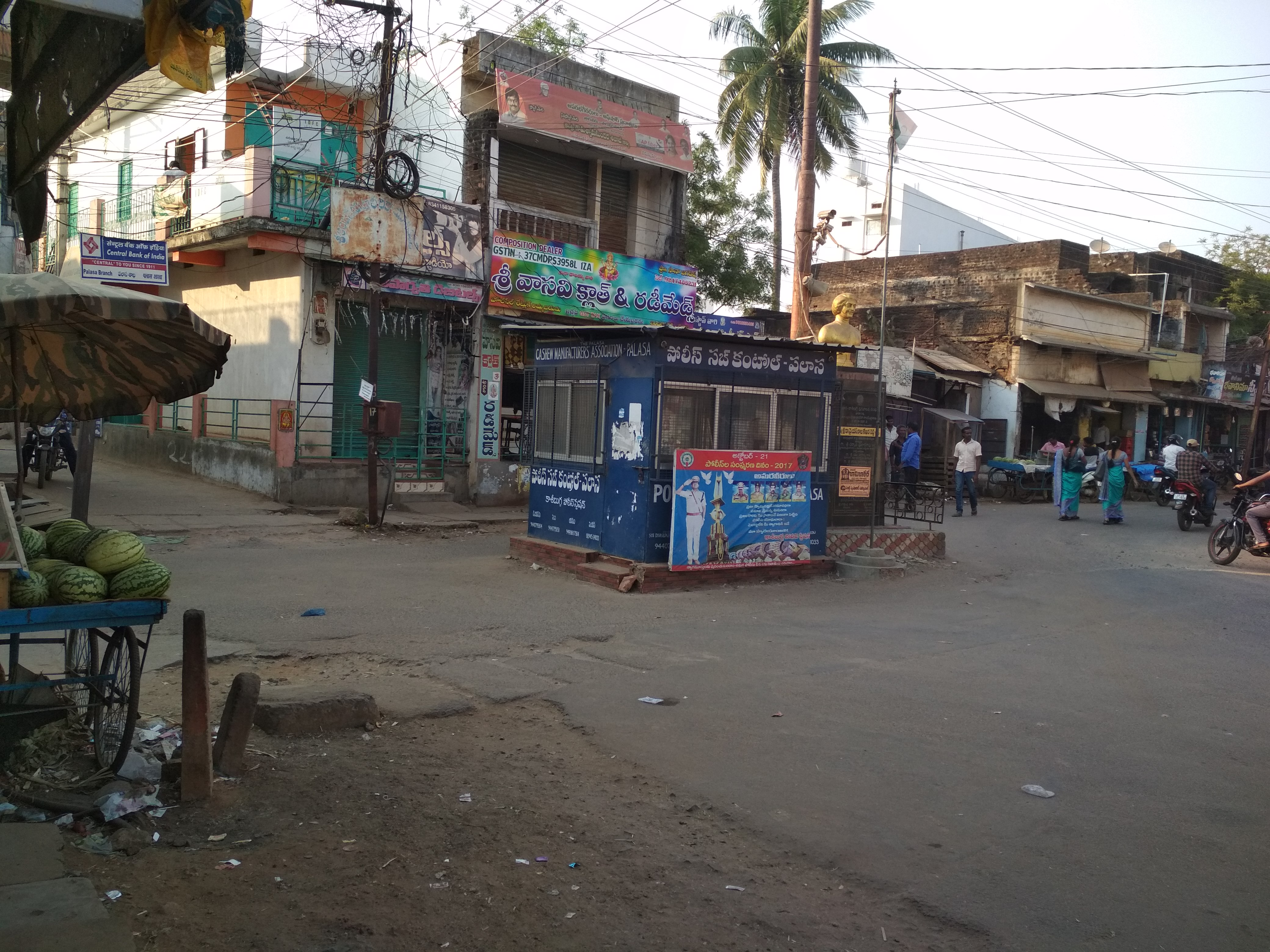
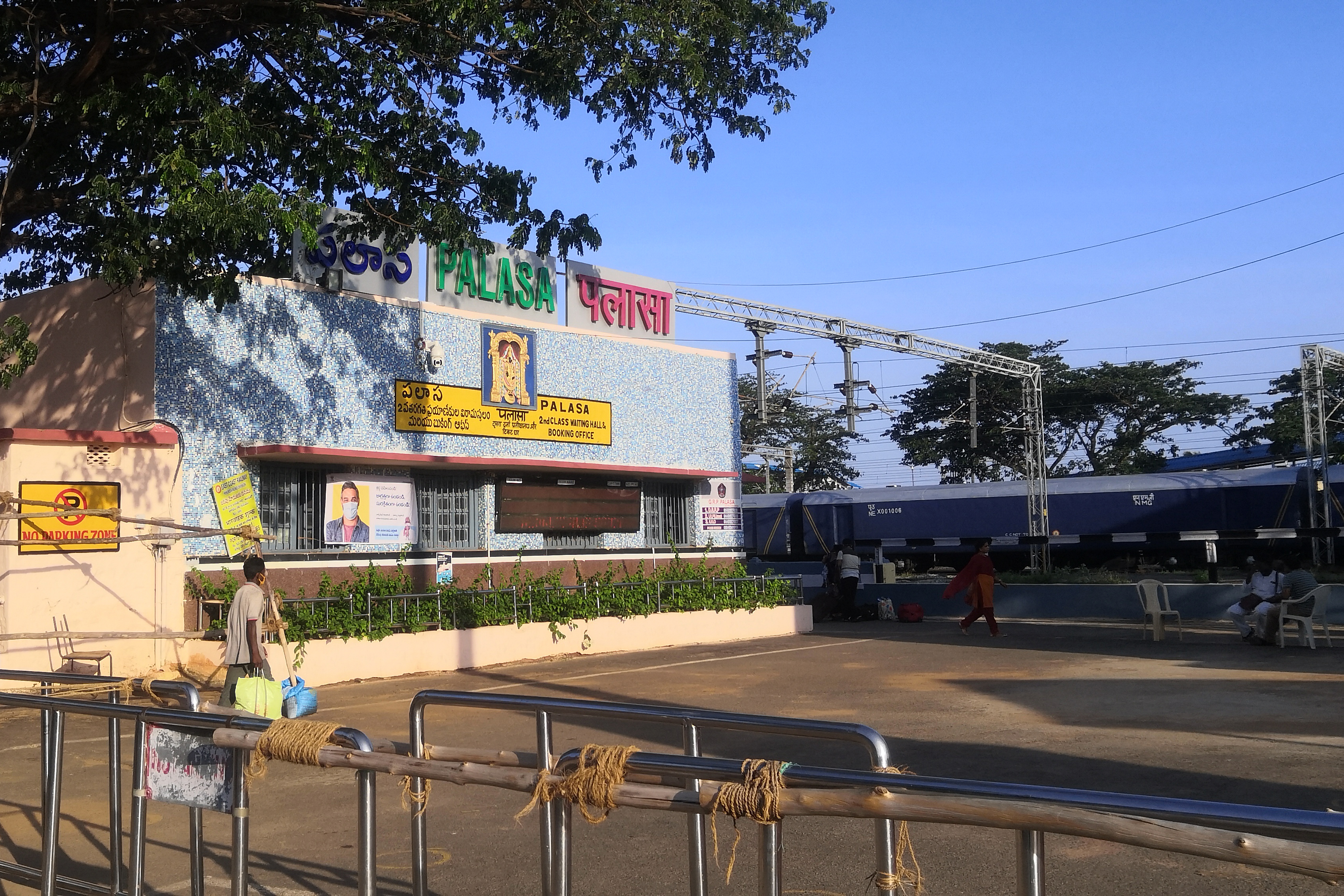
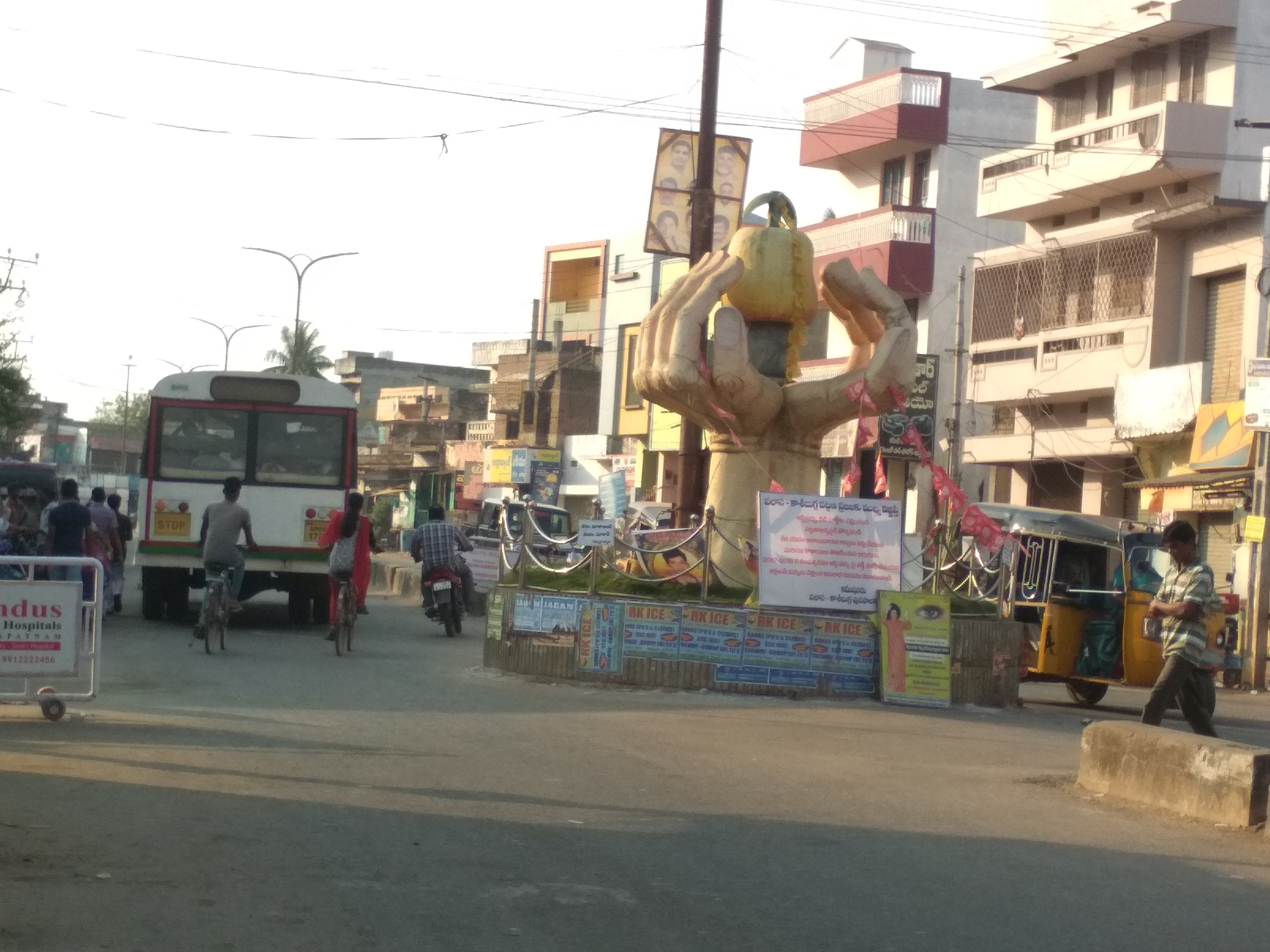
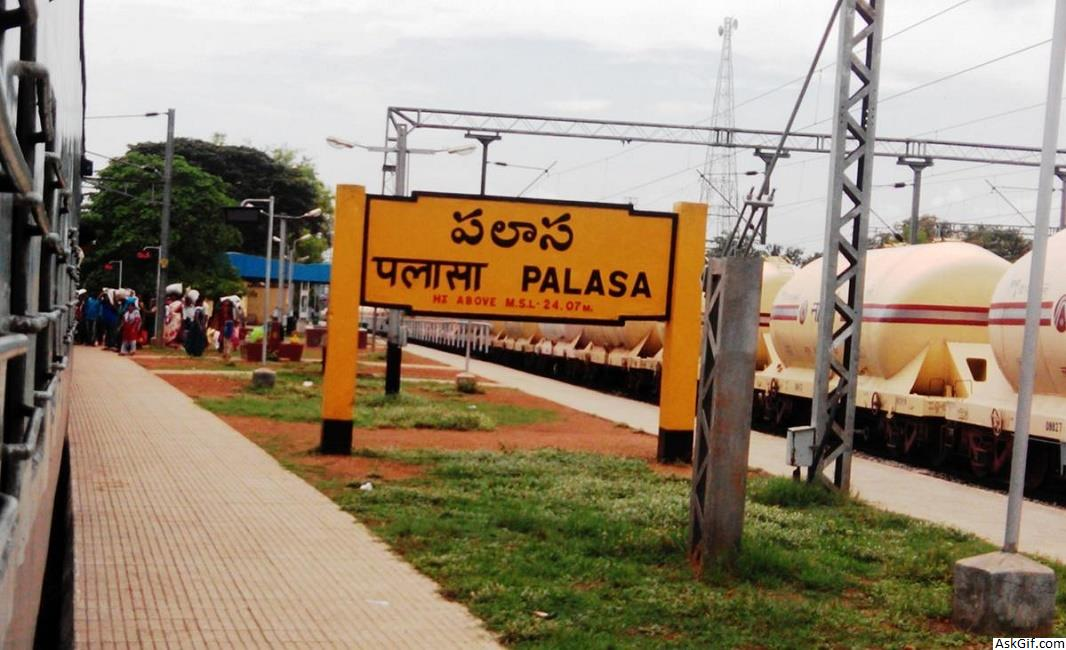
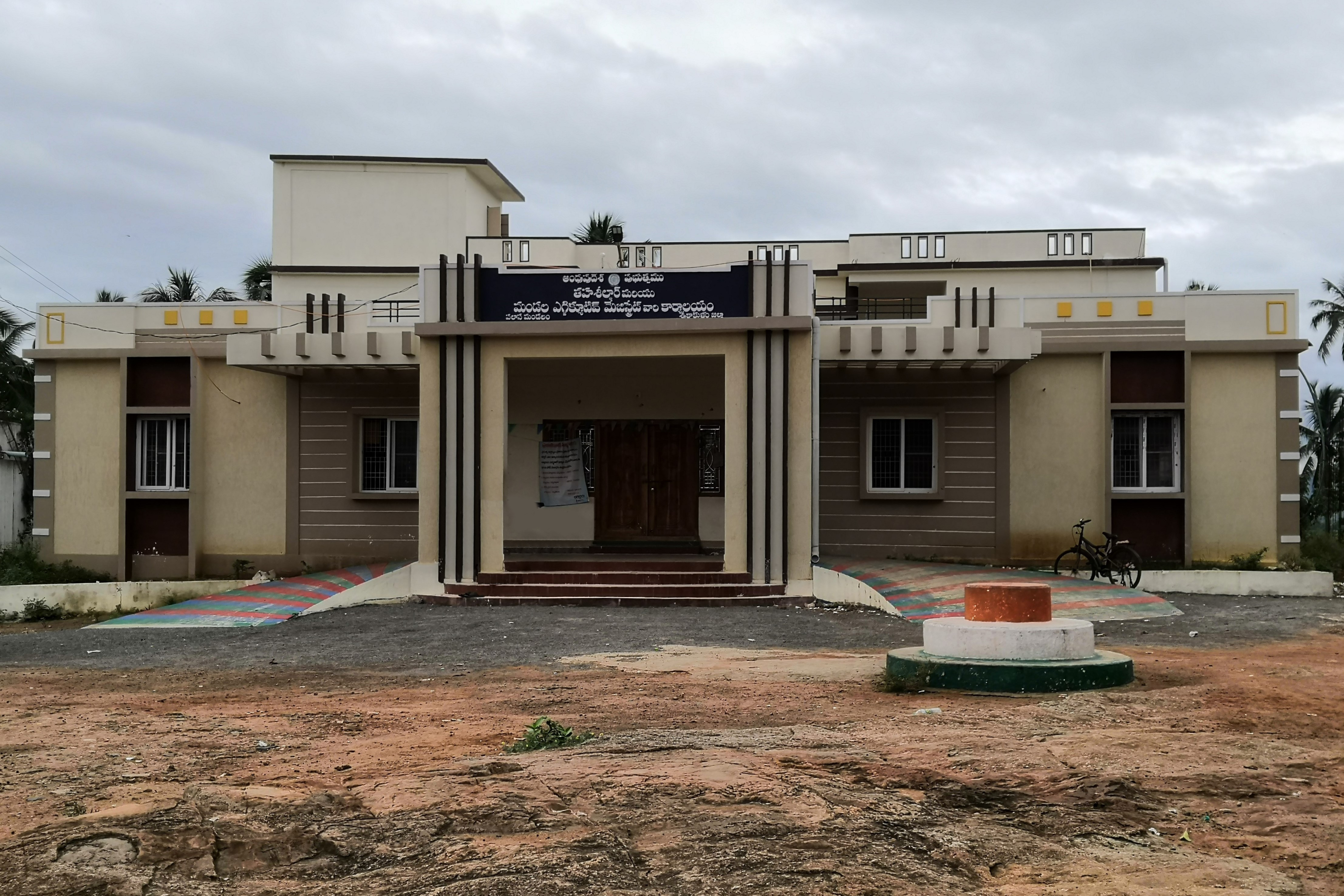
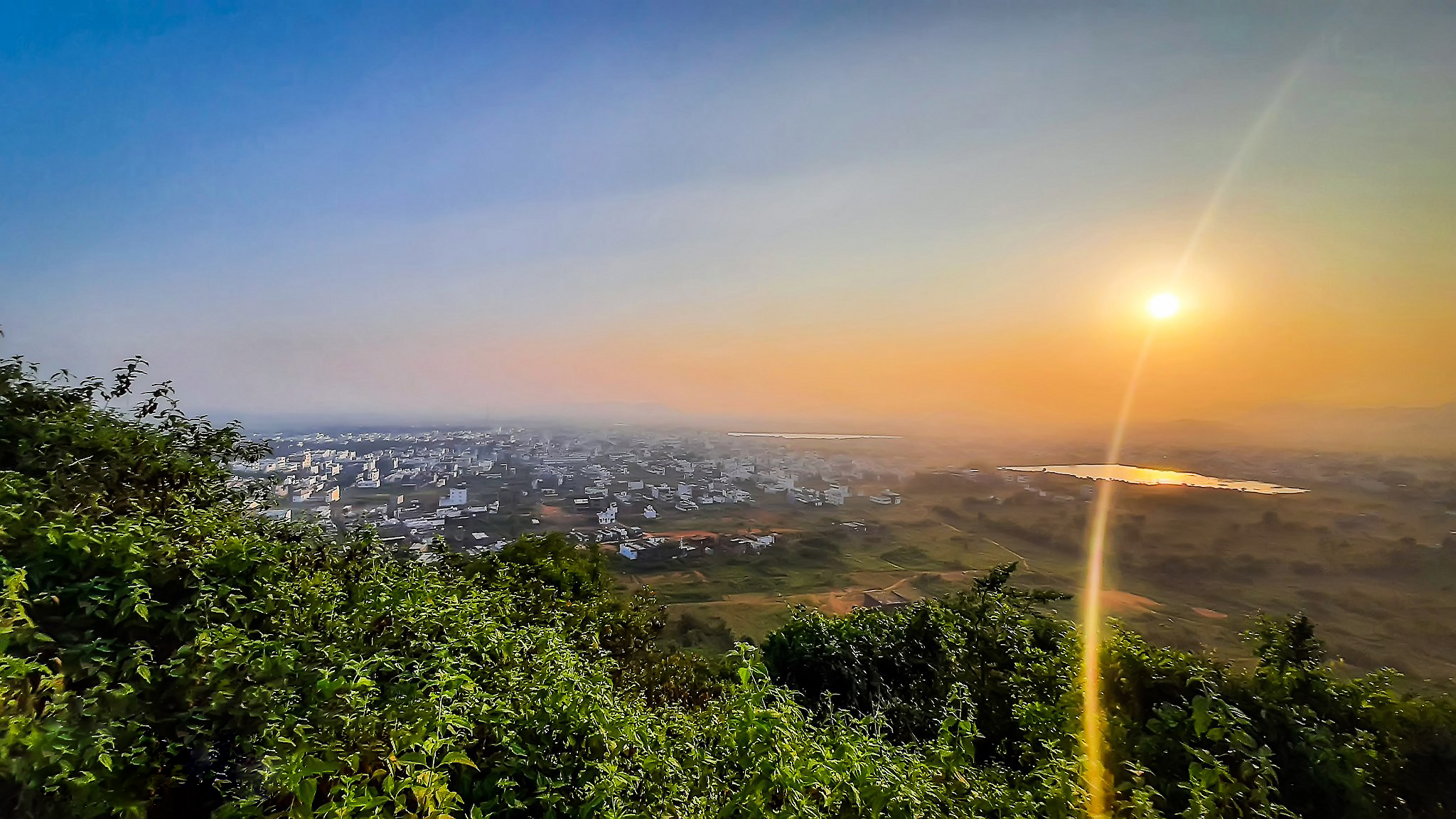
- Clockwise from top: Palasa Railway Station Entrance, Railway Station, View of palasa from nemalikonda, Mandal office, Cashew statue, Indira chowk
- Nickname: White Gold City
- Palasa in Andhra Pradesh, India Palasa (India) Palasa (Asia) Palasa (Earth)
- Coordinates: 18.773095°N 84.407830°E
- Country: India
- State: Andhra Pradesh
- District: Srikakulam

Government
  - Type: Municipality
  - Body: Palasa-Kasibugga Municipality, SUDA
  - MLA: Gouthu Sireesha (2024-Present)
  - Municipal Chairman: Vajja Gangabhavani (2026- Present)

Area
  - Total: 32.75 km^{2} (12.64 sq mi)
  - Rank: 1 (In Srikakulam)
- Elevation: 38 m (125 ft)

Population (2011)
  - Total: 57,507
  - Density: 1,756/km^{2} (4,548/sq mi)

Languages
  - Official: Telugu
- Time zone: UTC+5:30 (IST)
- PIN: 532221,532222
- Telephone code: 08945
- Vehicle registration: AP–39
- Website: Palasa–Kasibugga Municipality

Palasa is a town located in the Srikakulam district of Andhra Pradesh, India. The town is situated between Srikakulam and Berhampur. It is categorized as a second grade municipality. Also the town serves as the headquarters of Palasa Mandal.

== Etymology ==
The first pat of town's name, Palasa, is said to be derived from the initial Telugu letters of the names of three goddesses: Parvati (Pa), Lakshmi (La), and Saraswati (Sa). As a result, it is known as Palasa, reflecting the combination of these revered deities.

== History ==
Palasa and Kasibugga existed as separate towns till the government decided to create a combined Municipality in 2000.

== Geography ==
Palasa has an average elevation of 38 meters (127 feet). The town has an area of 32.75 km^{2} (12.64 mi^{2}).

== Demographics ==
As of 2011 census of India, the town had a population of 57507.

== Administration ==
The local governance body known as Palasa-Kasibugga Municipality was established in the year 2000. This body plays a vital role in the development and administration of the twin towns, Palasa and Kasibugga. It strives to help progress and development in the twin towns by implementing various initiatives.

The jurisdiction of Palasa-Kasibugga Municipality covers a total of 31 wards in the twin towns. These wards represent different geographic divisions within the municipality's administrative area. Each ward is represented by an elected councilor who advocates for the interests and concerns of the residents in that specific area.

== Assembly constituency ==
Palasa is also an Assembly constituency in the Andhra Pradesh Legislative Assembly. This constituency represents the political representation of the region in the state legislature.

The Palasa (Assembly constituency) includes three mandals under its jurisdiction:

1. Palasa Mandal
2. Mandasa Mandal
3. Vajrapu Kotturu Mandal

== Economy ==
Palasa is a significant center for cashew production in Andhra Pradesh, with more than 350 cashew processing industries operating in the region. Making it the highest among the northern coastal districts in Andhra Pradesh. The town's prominence in cashew processing also makes it one of the largest cashew processing hubs in India.

The cashew industry plays a vital role in the local economy, offering much employment opportunities to the community. Approximately 15,000 people in the surrounding areas benefit from both direct and indirect employment generated by this thriving sector. As a result, the cashew industry contributes significantly to the economic growth and livelihoods of the people in the region.

== Healthcare ==
The Community Health Centre, Andhra Pradesh Vaidya Vidhana Parishad is located here. It can hold 50 inpatients.

== Transport ==
=== Road ===
Palasa is well connected with major cities like Bhubaneswar (245 km) to the north and Visakhapatnam (198 km), Vijayawada (530 km) to the south through the National Highway NH-16 (Chennai–Kolkata).

The Andhra Pradesh State Road Transport Corporation (APSRTC) from its depot near New Complex Bus Stand at Palasa operates buses daily to several local places and to the major cities in the state.

Rail

Palasa is served by its own railway station under the Visakhapatnam division of South Coast Railway, and is situated in the Howrah - Chennai Main Line. The Palasa railway station is a major railway station in Srikakulam district which is categorised as NSG-3.

Air

The closest operational International airports to the town are: Alluri Sitarama Raju International Airport (VTZ) 148 km, Biju Patnaik Airport (BBI) 245 km.

== Education ==
The primary and secondary school education in the town is imparted by government and private schools, under the School Education Department of the state. The medium of instruction followed by different schools are English and Telugu.

== Climate Data ==
Palasa has a Tropical wet and dry or savanna climate (Classification: Aw). The town's yearly temperature is 29.06 °C (84.31 °F) and it is 3.09% higher than India's average. Palasa typically receives about 50.9 millimeters (2.0 inches) of precipitation and has 40.98 rainy days (11.23% of the time) annually.

Maximum summer temperature is 41 °C; minimum winter temperature is 16 °C. May is the hottest month; January is the coldest. The region receives monsoon and torrential rainfall from July to October.

Climate data for Palasa
Month	Jan	Feb	Mar	Apr	May	Jun	Jul	Aug	Sep	Oct	Nov	Dec	Year
Record high °C (°F)	32.0 (89.6)	37.0 (98.6)	39.0 (102.2)	40.0 (104.0)	41.0 (105.8)	41.0 (105.8)	36.0 (96.8)	36.0 (96.8)	34.0 (93.2)	34.0 (93.2)	33.0 (91.4)	31.0 (87.8)	41.0 (105.8)
Mean daily maximum °C (°F)	27.57 (81.63)	30.55 (86.99)	34.34 (93.81)	36.62 (97.92)	36.81 (98.26)	35.6 (96.1)	32.62 (90.72)	31.67 (89.01)	31.53 (88.75)	30.3 (86.5)	29.54 (85.17)	27.37 (81.27)	32.04 (89.67)
Mean daily minimum °C (°F)	18.32 (64.98)	20.92 (69.66)	24.06 (75.31)	26.2 (79.2)	27.53 (81.55)	28.61 (83.50)	27.28 (81.10)	26.57 (79.83)	26.01 (78.82)	23.82 (74.88)	21.27 (70.29)	18.88 (65.98)	24.12 (75.42)
Record low °C (°F)	16.0 (60.8)	17.0 (62.6)	18.0 (64.4)	20.0 (68.0)	19.0 (66.2)	24.0 (75.2)	21.0 (69.8)	19.0 (66.2)	22.0 (71.6)	20.0 (68.0)	16.0 (60.8)	15.0 (59.0)	15.0 (59.0)
Average precipitation mm (inches)	4.93 (0.19)	14.38 (0.57)	5.38 (0.21)	19.45 (0.77)	65.82 (2.59)	33.5 (1.32)	90.89 (3.58)	130.96 (5.16)	109.74 (4.32)	124.25 (4.89)	2.25 (0.09)	9.23 (0.36)	50.9 (2.00)
Source: Weather and Climate
